= Romanesque architecture in Spain =

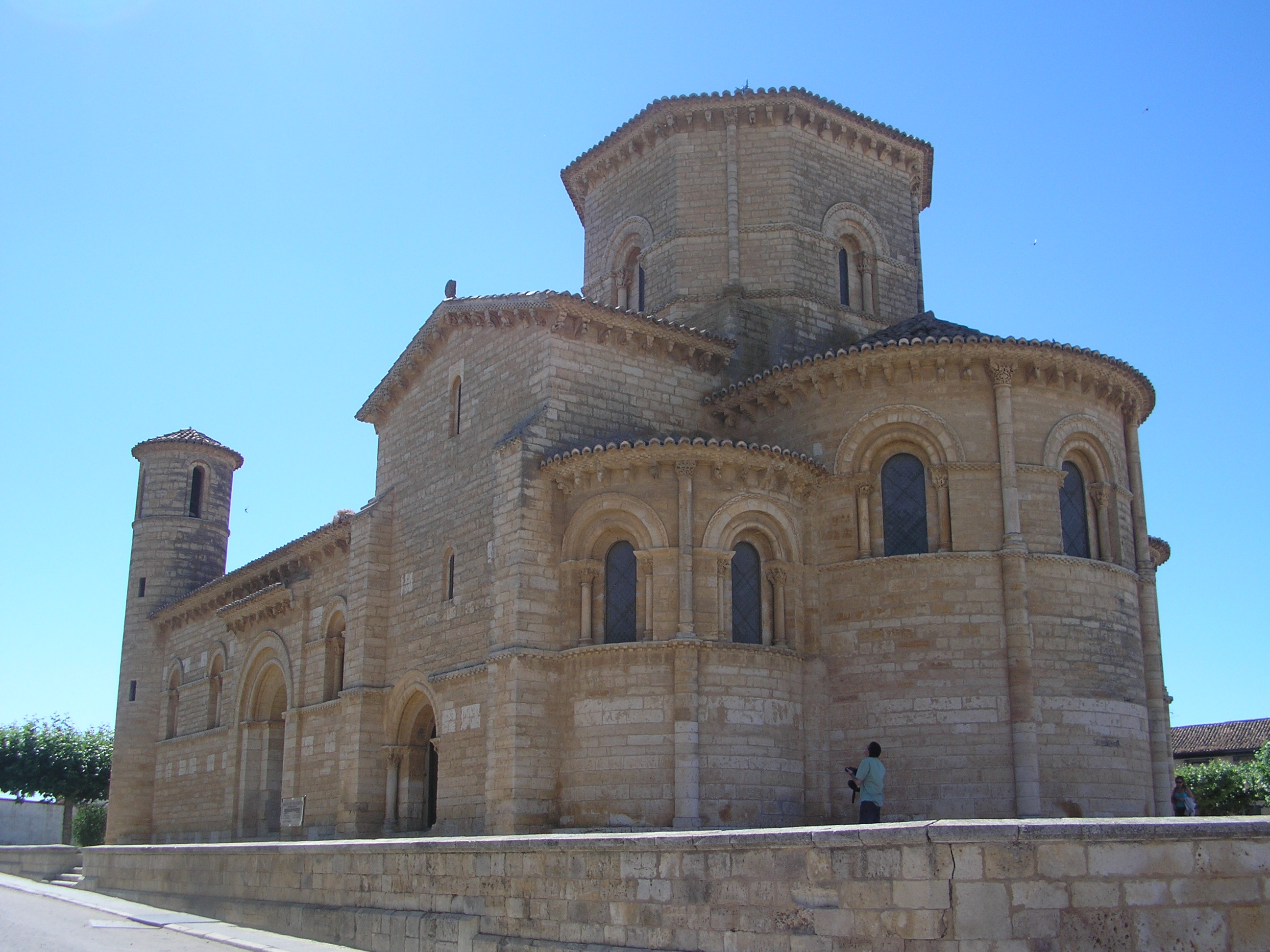
San Martín de Frómista, Palencia

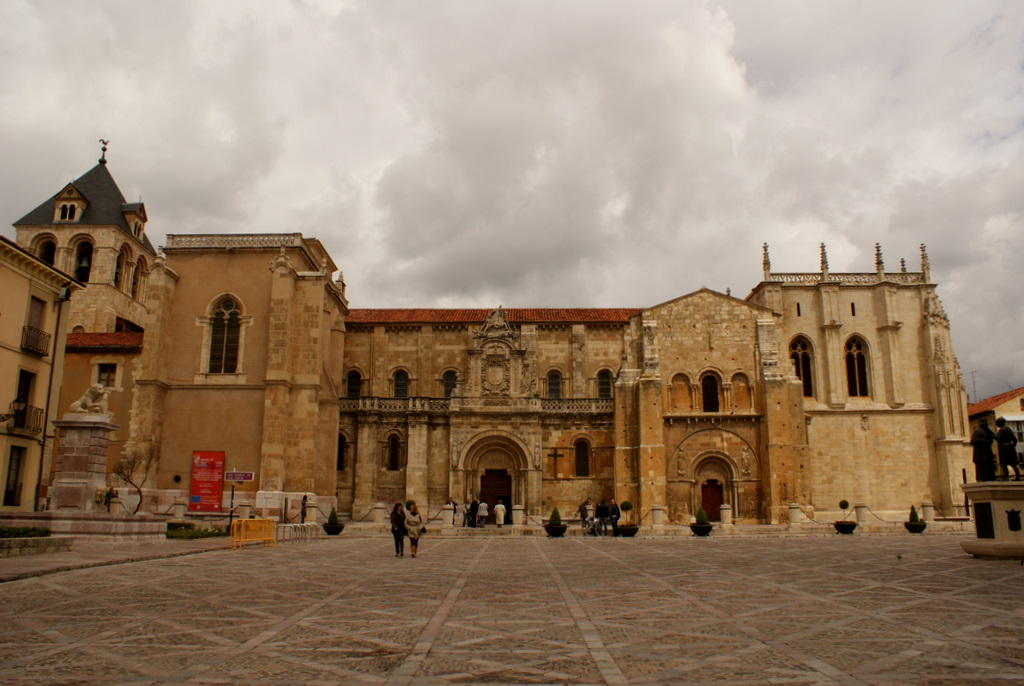
Basilica of San Isidoro, León

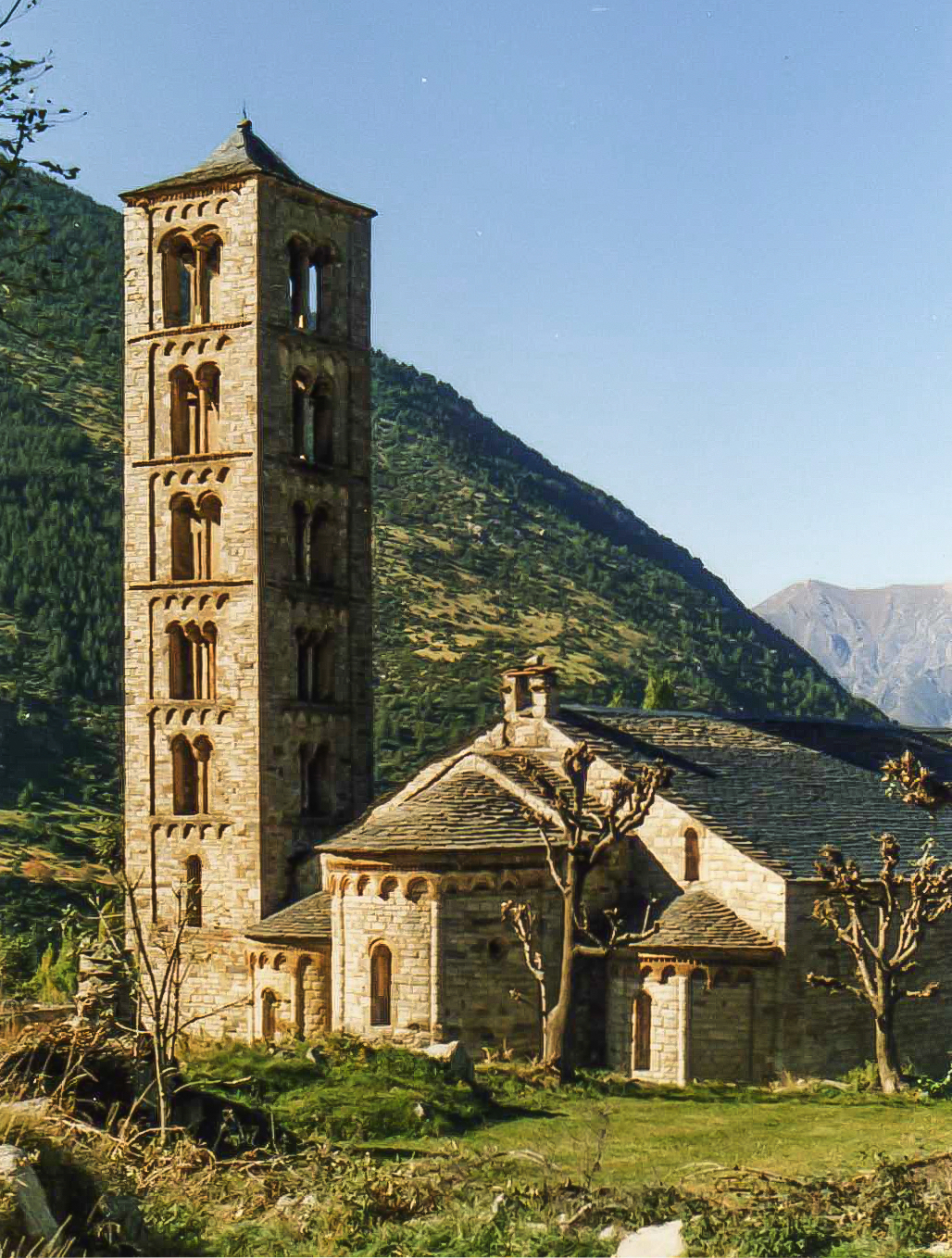
Church of St. Clement of Taüll, Lleida shows Lombard influences in the first Romanesque of Catalonia

Romanesque architecture in Spain is the architectural style reflective of Romanesque architecture, with peculiar influences both from architectural styles outside the Iberian Peninsula via Italy and France as well as traditional architectural patterns from within the peninsula. Romanesque architecture was developed in and propagated throughout Europe for more than two centuries, ranging approximately from the late tenth century until the thirteenth century.

During the eighth century, though Carolingian Renaissance extended its influence to Christian Western Europe, Christian Spain remained attached to the traditional Hispano-Roman and Gothic culture, without being influenced by European cultural movements, until the arrival of the Romanesque.

Romanesque architecture spread throughout the entire northern half of Spain, reaching as far as the Tagus river, at the height of the Reconquista and Repoblación, movements which greatly favored the Romanesque development. The First Romanesque style spread from Lombardy to the Catalan region via the Marca Hispánica, where it was developed and from where it spread to the rest of the peninsula with the help of the Camino de Santiago and the Benedictine monasteries. Its mark was left especially on religious buildings (e.g., cathedrals, churches, monasteries, cloisters, chapels) which have survived into the twenty-first century. Also, civil monuments (bridges, palaces, castles, walls and towers) were also built in this style.

== Background and historical context ==
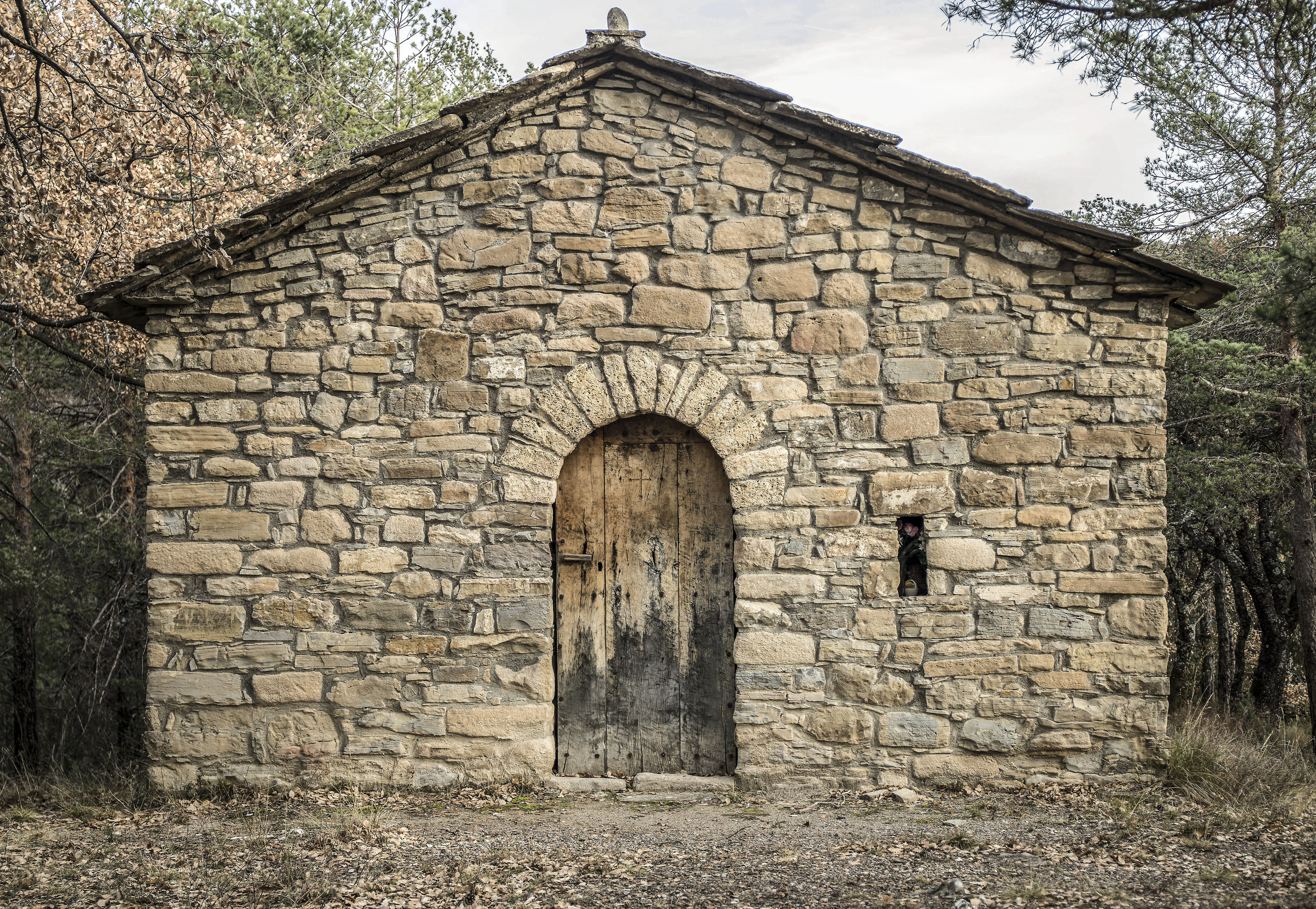
Sanctuary in the Spanish March (aragonese romanesque, 972)

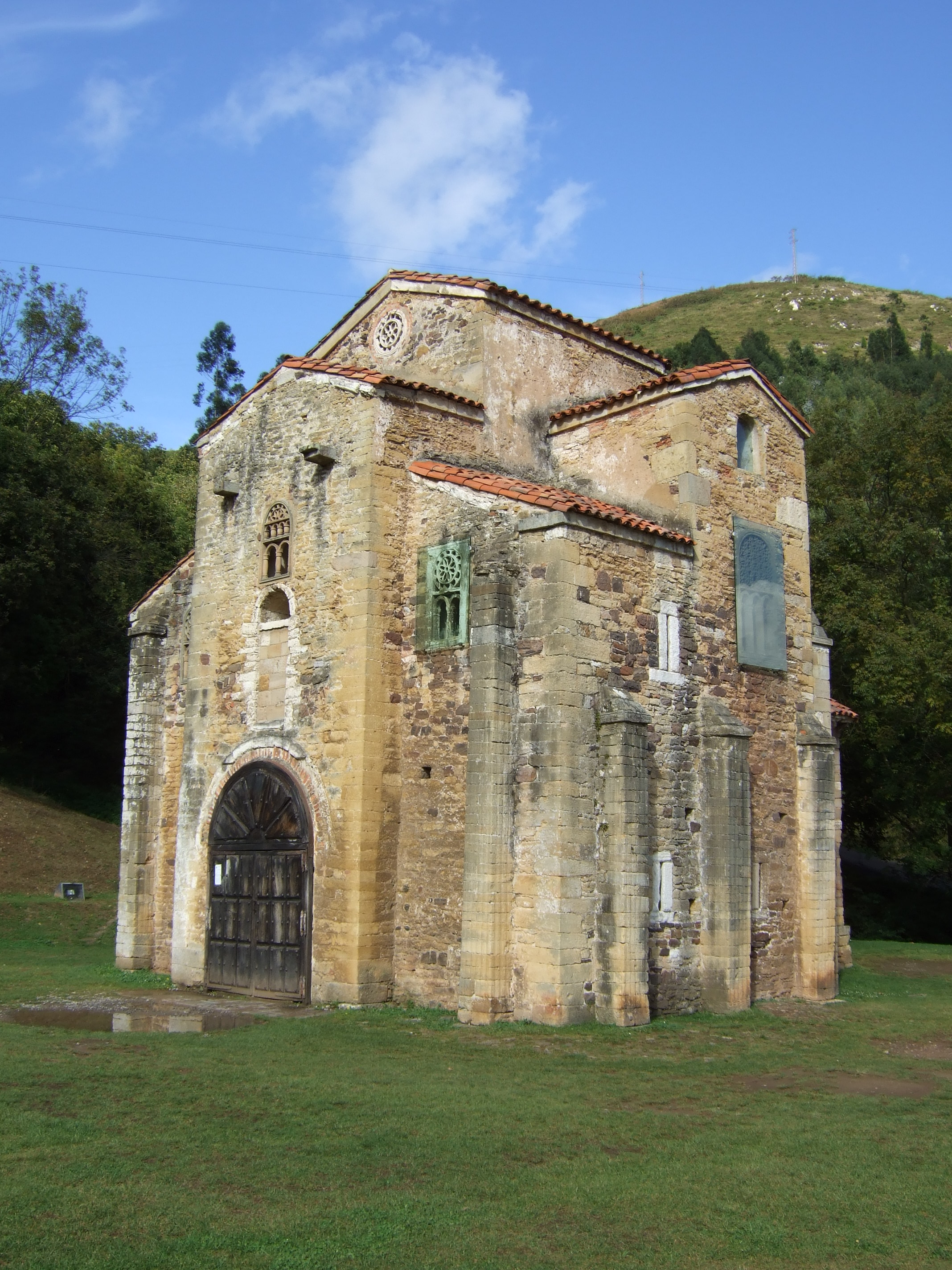
San Miguel de Lillo Church, example of Asturian art.

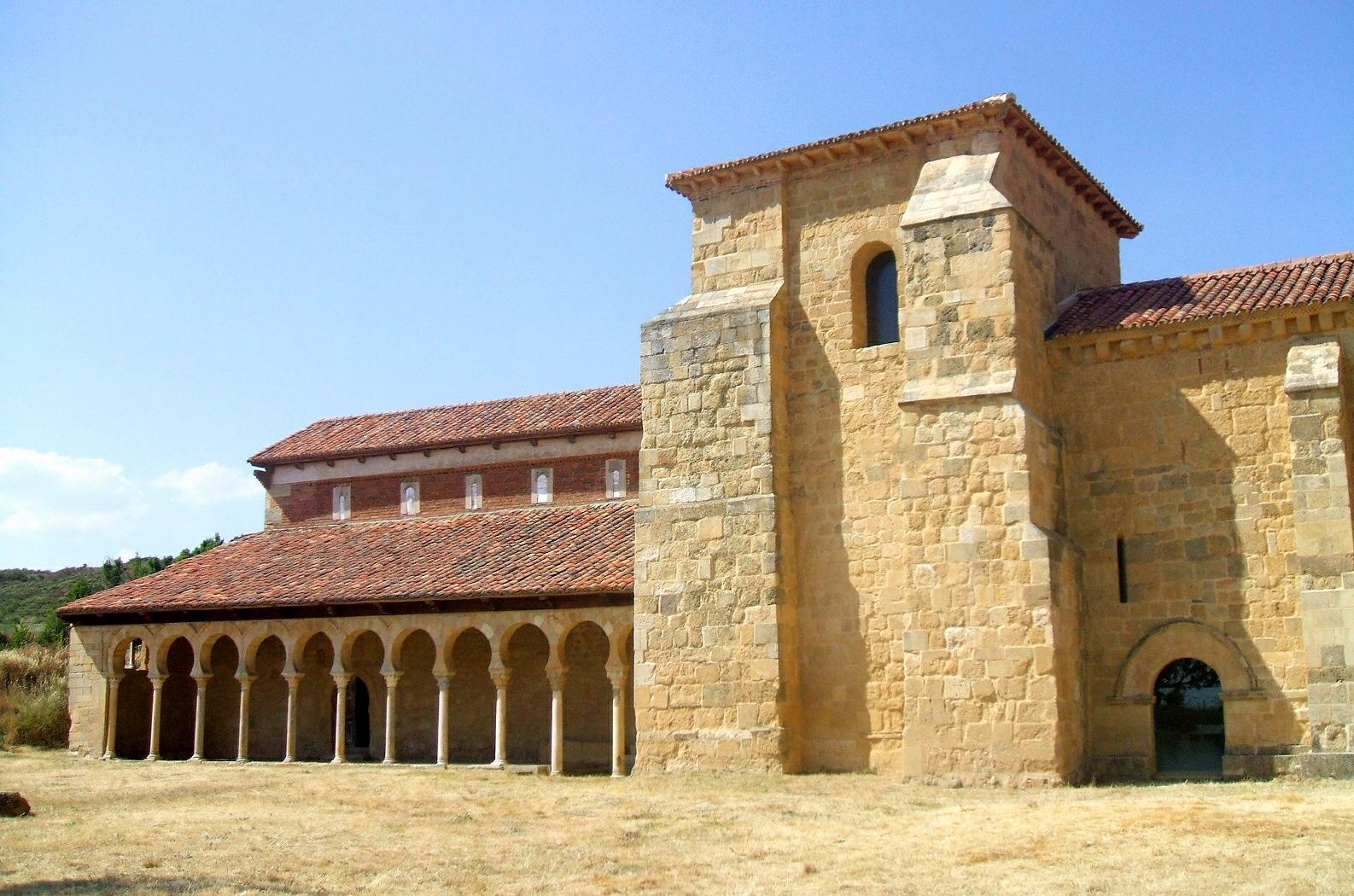
San Miguel de Escalada, a Mozarabic monastery in León

The Romanesque period corresponds to a time when Christianity was more secure and optimistic. Europe had seen, in the preceding centuries, the decline of the Carolingian splendor and had undergone Norman and Hungarian invasions (the Hungarians reached as far as Burgundy) that resulted in the destruction of many of the peninsula's monasteries. In Spain the Almanzor campaigns were disastrous, also razing and destroying many of the monasteries and small churches.

Towards the end of the tenth century, a number of stabilizing events restored some balance and tranquility in Europe, greatly easing the political situation and life in Christendom. The main forces that emerged were the Ottomans and the Holy Roman Empire, including the pope, whose power became universal and who had the power in Rome to crown emperors. In Spain the Christian kings were well underway with the Reconquista, signing pacts and cohabitation charters with the Muslim kings. Within this context an organizational spirit emerged throughout Christendom with the monks from Cluny. Monasteries and churches were built during these years and architecture was geared towards more durable structures to withstand future attack as well as fire and natural disasters. The use of a vault instead of a wood covering spread throughout Europe.

Additionally, communications were re-established and there was rapprochement between various European monarchs as well as restored relations with Byzantium. The Roman legacy of roads and highways allowed better communication between the numerous monasteries and facilitated pilgrimages to the holy places or small enclaves of popular devotion. As a result, commerce was increased and the movement of people disseminated new lifestyles, among which was the Romanesque style. Shrines, cathedrals, and others were built in the Romanesque style over nearly two and a half centuries.

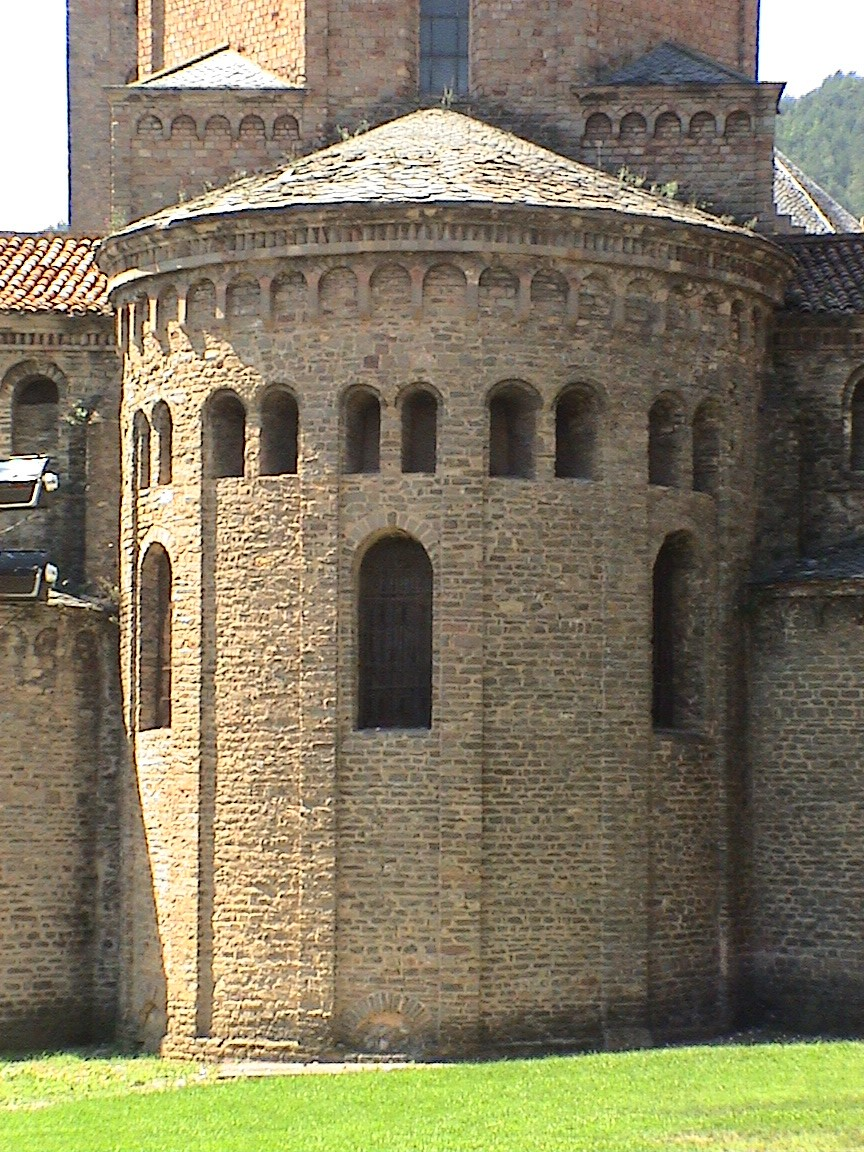
Apse of the Ripoll Monastery.

== Artists and professionals ==
In the Middle Ages, the concept of "architect" – as understood amongst the Romans – fell out of use, giving way to a social change. The duties of the former architect came to rest on the master builder. This was an artist who, in most cases, took part in the actual construction along with the team of workers which he had under his command. The master builder was the one who oversaw the edifice (as the ancient architect did), but at the same time could also be a craftsman, a sculptor, a carpenter or stonecutter. This person was usually educated in monasteries or groups of unionized masonic lodges. Many of these master builders were the designers of gorgeous portals or porticos, such as the one at the Santiago de Compostela Cathedral made by Master Mateo, the portico of the Nogal de las Huertas in Palencia, by Master Jimeno, or the north portal of the San Salvador de Ejea de los Caballeros Church (in Zaragoza province) by Master Agüero.

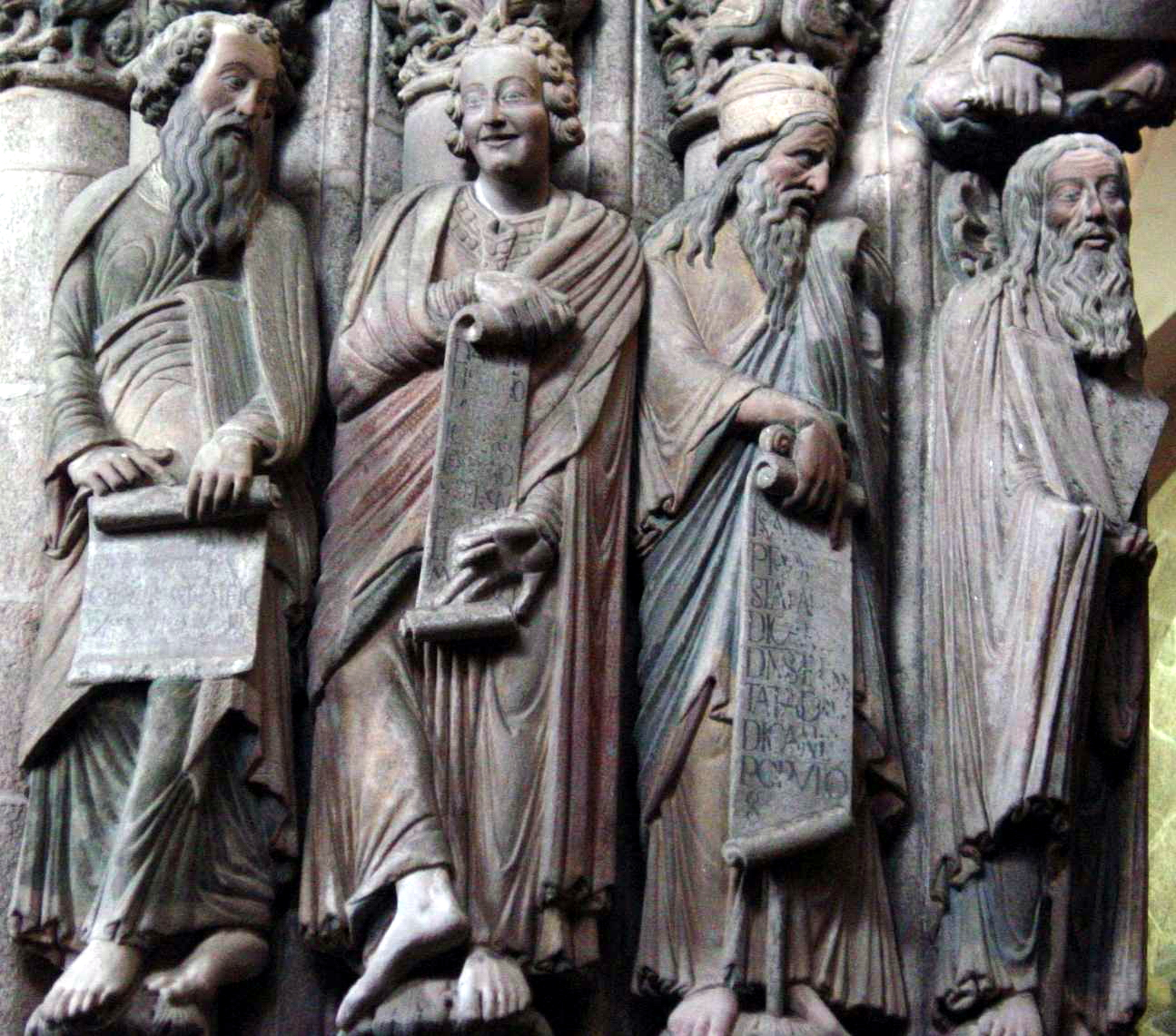
Sculptures in the Portico of Glory of the Santiago de Compostela Cathedral, work of Master Mateo.

All Romanesque architectural work was made up of the director (master builder), a foreman in charge of a large group forming workshops of stonecutters, masons, sculptors, glassmakers, carpenters, painters and many other trades or specialties, who moved from one place to another. These crews formed workshops from which local masters often emerged, who were able to raise rural churches. In this set we must not forget the most important figure, the patron or developer, without whom the work would not be completed.

From documents that have survived in Spain about works contracts, litigation and other issues, it is known that a house or living accommodation was allocated in the cathedrals for the master and his family. There are litigation documents that speak of the problems of the widow of a master, where she claimed for herself and her family a house for life. In some cases, this issue presented a real conflict as the subsequent master of the building would also need to occupy the house.

The master builders frequently had to commit themselves for a lifetime if the work were long-term, as was the case of Master Mateo with the construction of the Santiago de Compostela Cathedral or Master Ramon Llambard (or Raimundo Lambardo) with the Santa Maria de Urgel Cathedral. There was a provision in the contracts requiring that master's always provide: their daily presence on site and strict control of workers and of the progress of the building.

A workhouse was also always built for the preparation of materials and carving of the stone. Many fourteenth-century documents speak of this house:

La obra de iglesia de Burgos que há unas casas cerca de la dicha iglesia en que tienen todas las cosas que son menester para la dicha obra; e los libros de las cuentas é todas las otras herramientas con que labran los maestros en la dicha obra.(in Spanish)
(The construction of the Burgos church that has some houses near the said church in which they have all the things that are necessary for said work; and the books of the accounts and all other tools with which the masters labour in the said work.)

=== Stonemasons ===
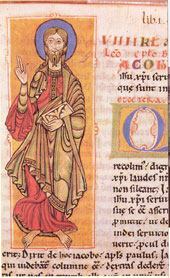
Codex Calixtinus.

Stonemasons formed the bulk of workers in the erection of the building. The number of stonecutters could vary depending on the local economy. Some of these numbers are known, such as the Old Cathedral of Salamanca, which employed between 25 and 30. Aymeric Picaud in his Codex Calixtinus provides data that:

[...] with about 50 other stonemasons who worked there regularly, under the caring direction of Don Wicarto (con aproximadamente otros 50 canteros que allí trabajaban asiduamente, bajo la solícita dirección de don Wicarto)[...]

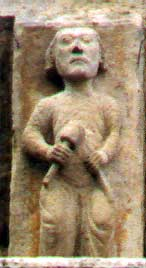
A relief from the Magdalena Church in Tudela, Navarre, depicting a stonecutter.

These masons and other workers were exempted from paying taxes. They were separated in two groups depending on their specialization. The first group those who were engaged in a special high-quality work (genuine sculpting artists) and who worked at their own pace, leaving their completed work at the site to be later placed on the building. The second group were permanent employees, who raised buildings stone upon stone and put in place those quality pieces or carved reliefs done by the first group at the right time. This way of working could lead to a time lag in the pieces being placed sometime after being created, a lag in many cases which has become a big problem for historians in dating the building.

There was also a group of unskilled laborers who worked wherever there was a need. In many cases these people offered their work or skill as an act of mercy because as Christians they were willing to collaborate on a great work dedicated to their God. In any case they received a remuneration that was either by the day or per piece. In documents many names appear on lists of daily wages, so this act was not arbitrary but rather well regulated.

Among the Cistercians they became known as cuadrillas de ponteadores (scoring crews), made up of laymen or monks who moved from one county to another, always under the direction of a professional monk, whose job it was to pave grounds, build roads, or build bridges.

=== Anonymity and artists' signatures ===
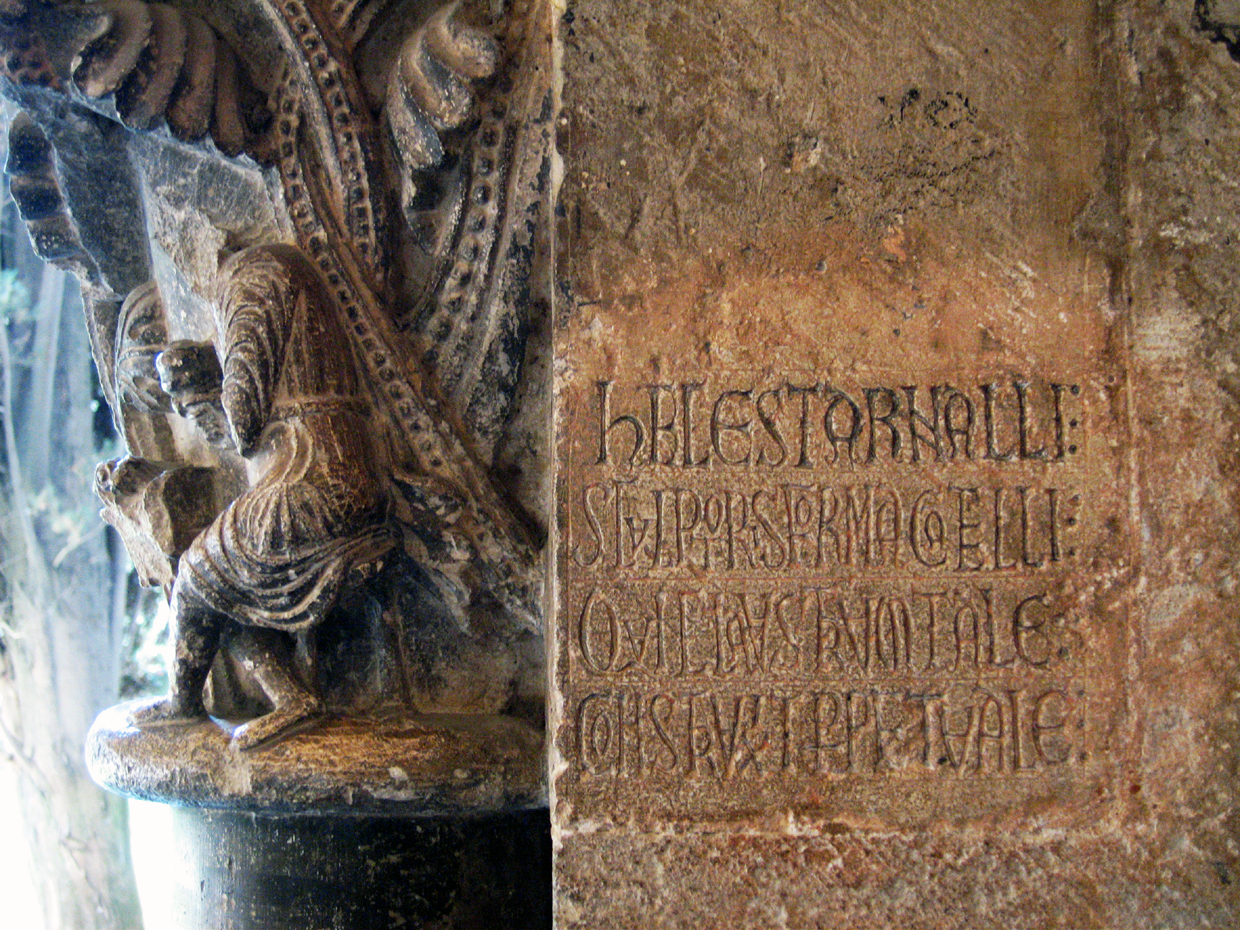
Arnaldo Cadell's signature, in the Sant Cugat Monastery.

Most Romanesque works are anonymous in the sense of lacking a signature or proof of authorship. Even if the work is signed, specialists' historians sometimes have difficulty distinguishing whether reference is made to the actual creator or the sponsor of the work. Sometimes there is a signature or an explanation that clarifies if either one or another person. Arnau Cadell made it clear on the Sant Cugat capital: This is the image of Arnau Cadell sculptor who built this cloister for posterity.

hec est arnalli sculptoris forma catelli qui claustrum tale construxit perpetuale (in Italian)

Rodrigo Gustioz also wanted to be immortalized for his funding of an arch in the Santa Maria de Lebanza: Rodrigo Gustioz made this arc, a man from Valbuena, soldier, pray for him.

isto arco fecitrodricus gustiut vir valdebonus militeorate pro illo (in Italian)

This notice by another sponsor appears on a capital:

El prior Pedro Caro hizo esta iglesia, casa, claustro y todo lo que aquí está fundado en el año 1185. (in Spanish)
Prior Pedro Caro made this church, house, cloister and everything here was founded in 1185.

In other cases it is the systematic study of the sculpture along with the architecture that has allowed historians to draw conclusions. Thus it is known that in the Lleida Cathedral, Pere de Coma served as master builder from 1190-1220, but during that period there were also several clearly differentiated sculpture workshops. The same study conducted in the Santiago de Compostela Cathedral suggests Master Mateo as the promoter and director of successive workshops which has aspects performed by different hands but under one coherent direction.

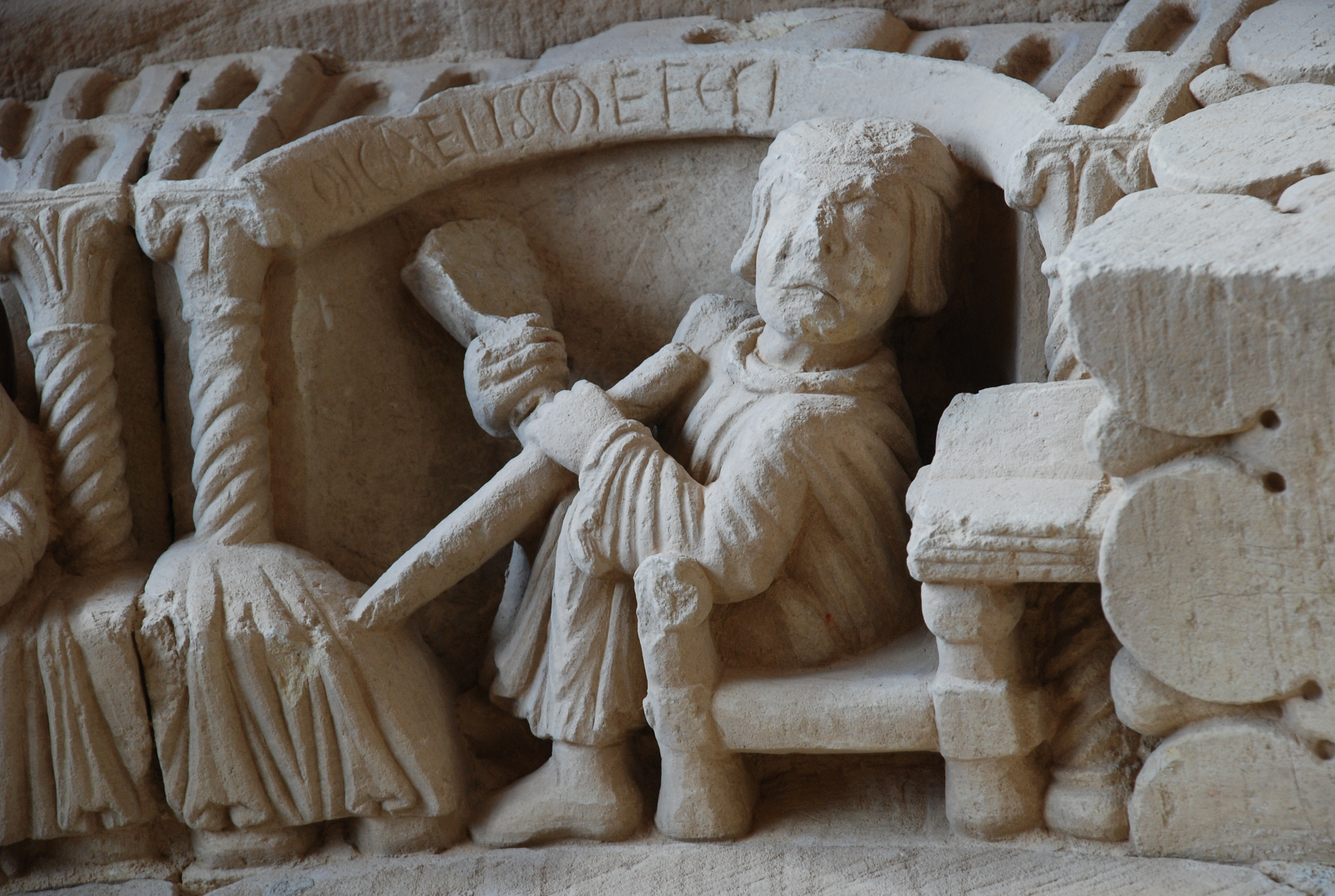
Micaelis me fecit signature on San Cornelio & San Cipriano's Church, Palencia.

The fact that most Romanesque works have remained anonymous has developed the theory that the artist considered that he was not the right person to place his name on works dedicated to God. However, on one hand, the few civil works that remain are not signed either and on the other hand, such a view is countered by a long list that could be given of artists who sign their works themselves, among which are:

- Raimundo de Monforte, which appears in 1129 documents as contracted to build the Lugo Cathedral.
- Pedro Deustamben, appears on a funeral epitaph in San Isidoro de León as builder of the domes.
- Raimundo Lambard or Lambardo, who worked from 1175 on the Urgell Cathedral.
- Masters Bernardo el Viejo, Roberto and Esteban who worked on the Santiago de Compostela Cathedral.
- Master Pere de Coma, who worked in the late twelfth century on the Lleida Cathedral.
- Master Micaelis, who worked on several churches and chapels in northern Palencia, and left his portrait while working on the portal of San Cornelio & San Cipriano in Palencia.

The list could be extended with many more names which appeared right on the stone itself by way of signature or on procurement documents, as proof that the intended construction was neither prohibited nor discouraged. What is difficult to distinguish in many cases is the trade of the person signing as they could either be architects, specialized stonemasons or sculptors of selected pieces. All of them were often called Master and all used his craft during the construction according to the wishes and the mandate of the promoters and patrons.

=== Developers and sponsors ===
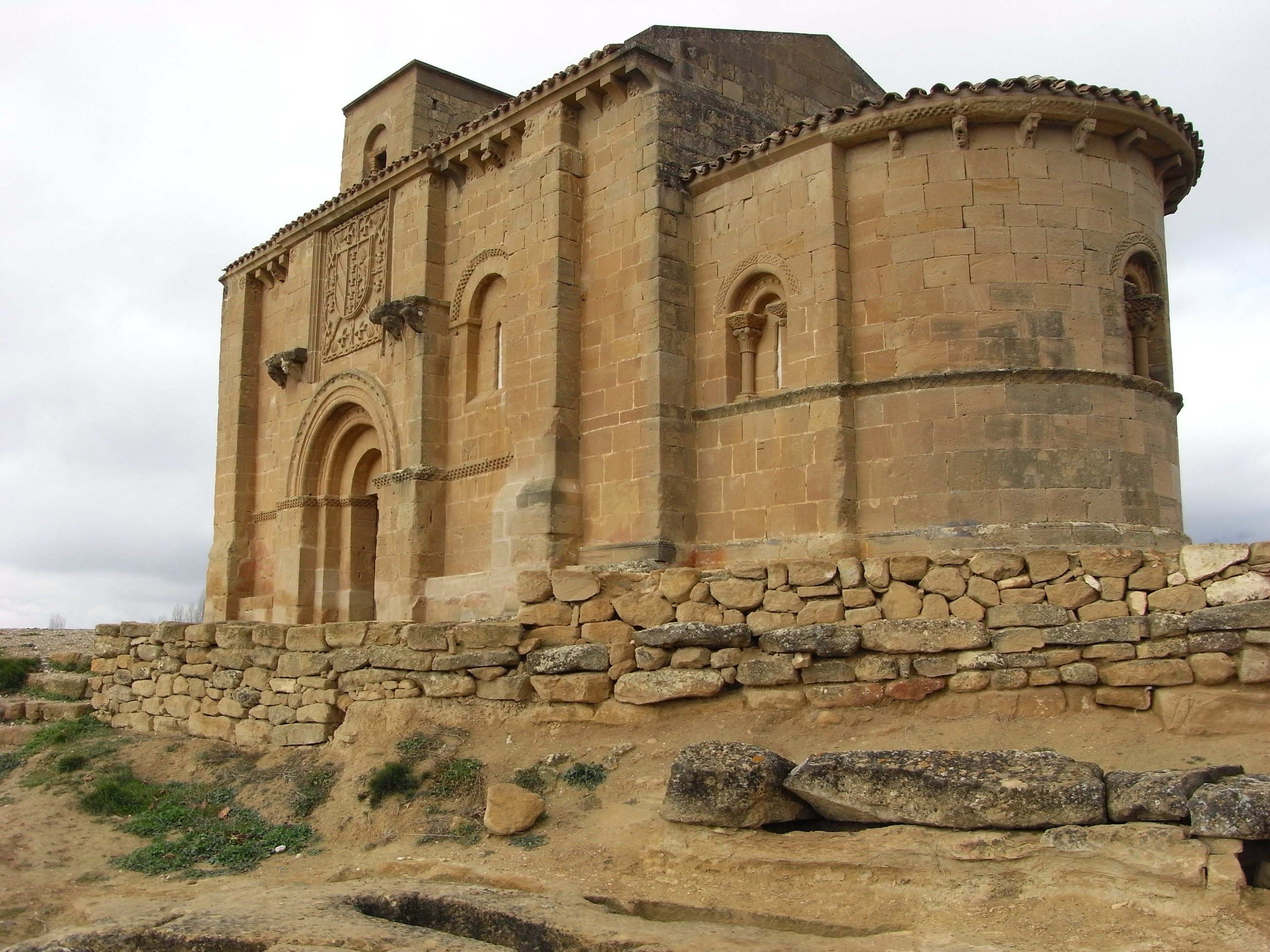
Santa María de La Piscina Hermitage, La Rioja, construction ordered by Ramiro Sánchez, the Navarran infante.

In the Romanesque world both the promoter of the works as well as the patron and financier were the true stars of the architectural work or the work of art to be created. They are in charge and determine how the work should be done, what should be the characters or the saints in sculpture and reliefs, the geometric dimensions and they encourage and exalt the project. The promoters were in charge of hiring and also calling the best artists and architects who worked with their momentum and enthusiasm.

Especially in sculpture and painting, the artist was fully submitted to the will of the patrons and sponsors, without whose intervention the work would never be done. The Romanesque artist adapted to the will of these people giving the best work of his trade and complying with the satisfaction of a job well done without having any desire nor intending to acquire worldwide fame as he began to develop from the Renaissance. The pride of a job well done and the recognition of his peers and patron were the greatest of the awards and so sometimes this pride led them to put it very simply in one of his finished works.

In Spain, kings and a minority of the nobility introduced the new Romanesque trends early on (which carried with it a Benedictine renewal and acceptance of the Roman Liturgy), while another part of the nobility and most of the bishops and monks still clung to the old ways and the Hispanic liturgy. However, the Romanesque fully triumphed and this was mainly due to the patrons and promoters who carried out great works from which the new style was developed throughout the northern half of the Iberian Peninsula.

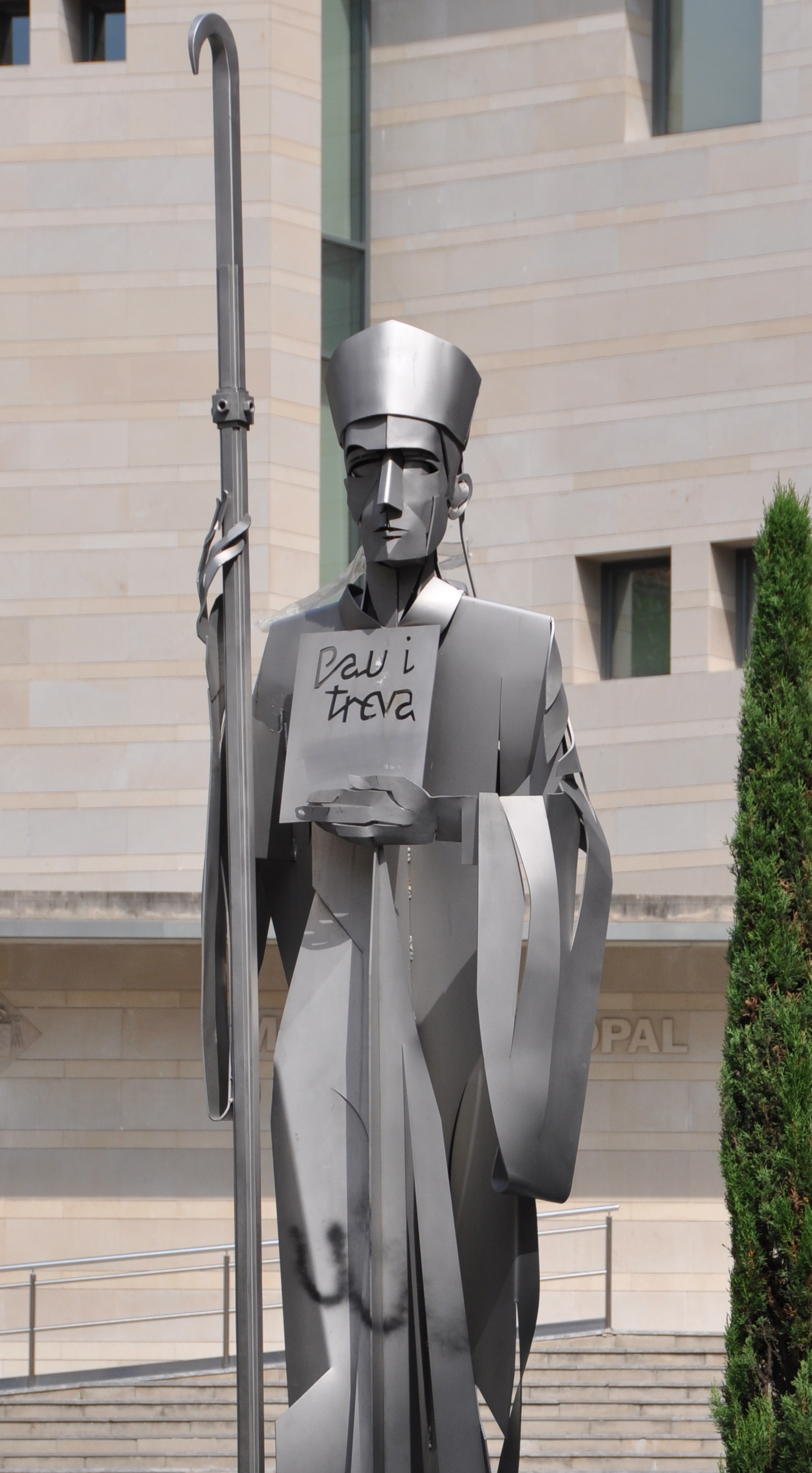
Statue of Abbot Oliba (abad Oliba) in Vich, Catalonia

Abbot Oliba was a patron, sponsor and huge promoter of Romanesque art in Catalonia from an early date. In 1008 he was appointed abbot of the monasteries in Ripoll and Cuixá and ten years later he was appointed bishop of Vich. His travels to Rome (1011 and 1016) and his contact with Franco monasticism, accounted for his knowledge of the Roman liturgy and its introduction into the Catalan Church. The Benedictine reform in Cluny had a considerable impact on Cuixá with which Oliba maintained close relations. Oliba adopted Cluny's standards, both in architecture as well as customs and under his patronage and direction major reforms were carried out, new buildings or in other cases mere extensions to suit the needs of the times. During these initial years Abbot Oliba endeavored to be present at consecrations - meetings in which discussions regarding a particular construction, etc. were held. Oliba, during the period between 1030 and 1040 was the driving force behind important buildings such as:

- Sant Vicenç, Cardona, completely rebuilt.
- Montserrat and Montbuy Monasteries.
- The Ripoll, Cuixá, St-Martin-du-Canigou and Vic Monasteries, the latter of which he was personally and directly involved.
- Sant Pere de Rodes.
- Girona Cathedral.

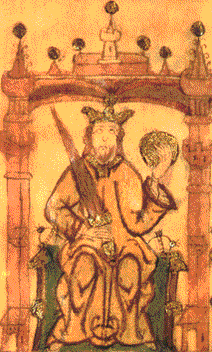
King Alfonso VI.

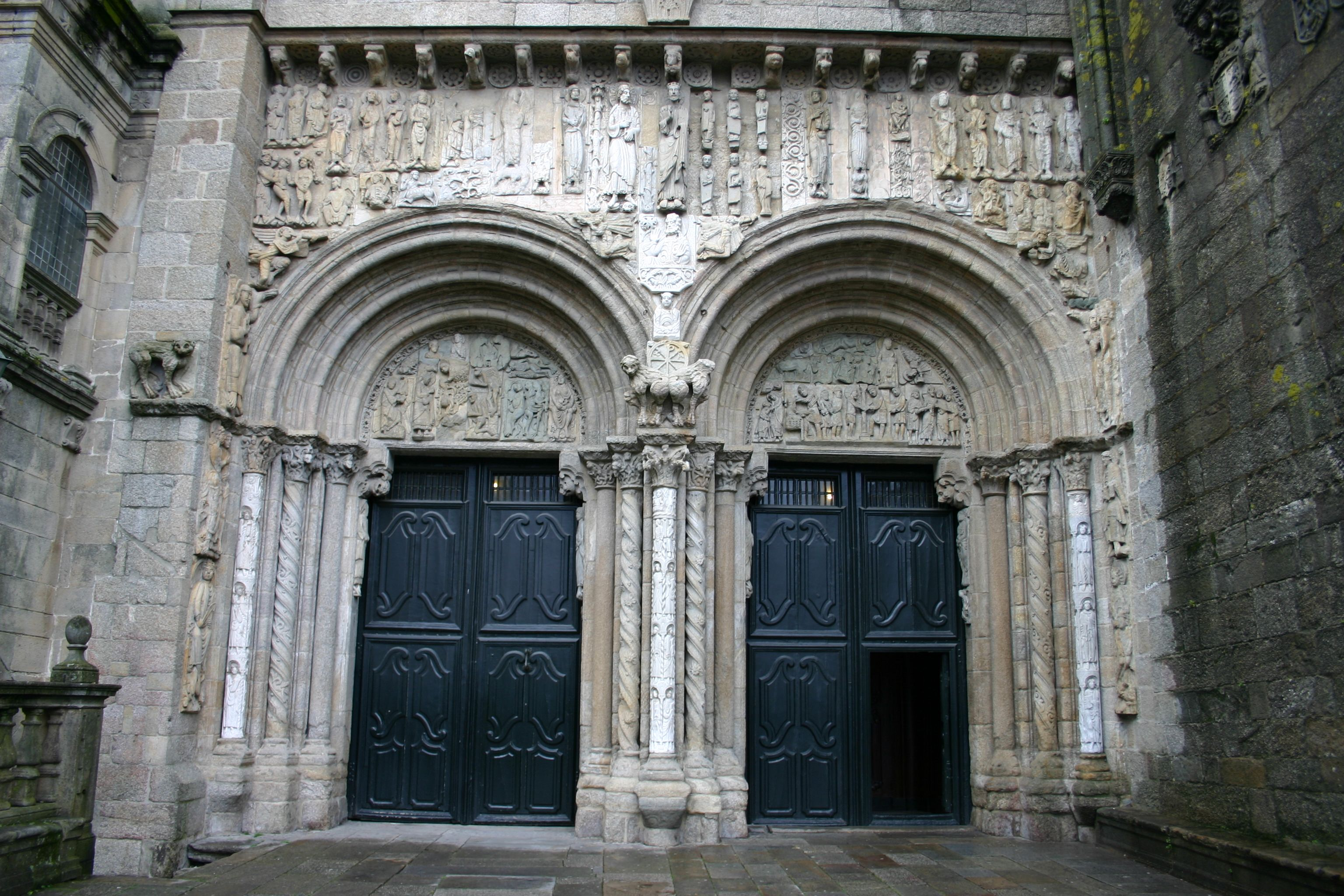
Puertas de las Platerías at the Santiago de Compostela Cathedral, construction ordered by Gelmírez.

== Architectural schools in Spain ==
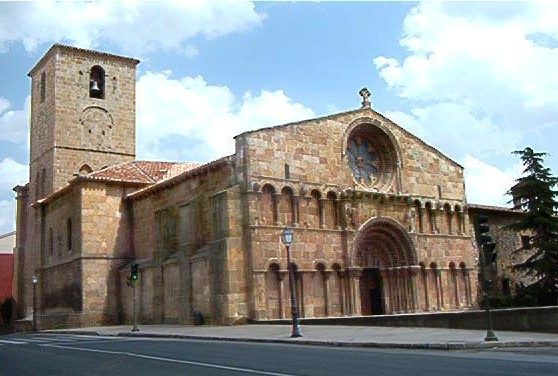
Iglesia de Santo Domingo, Soria, Poitou school

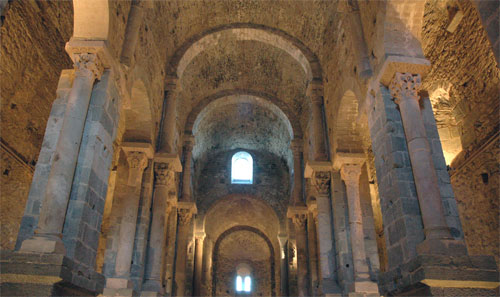
Sant Pere de Rodes, northeastern Catalonia

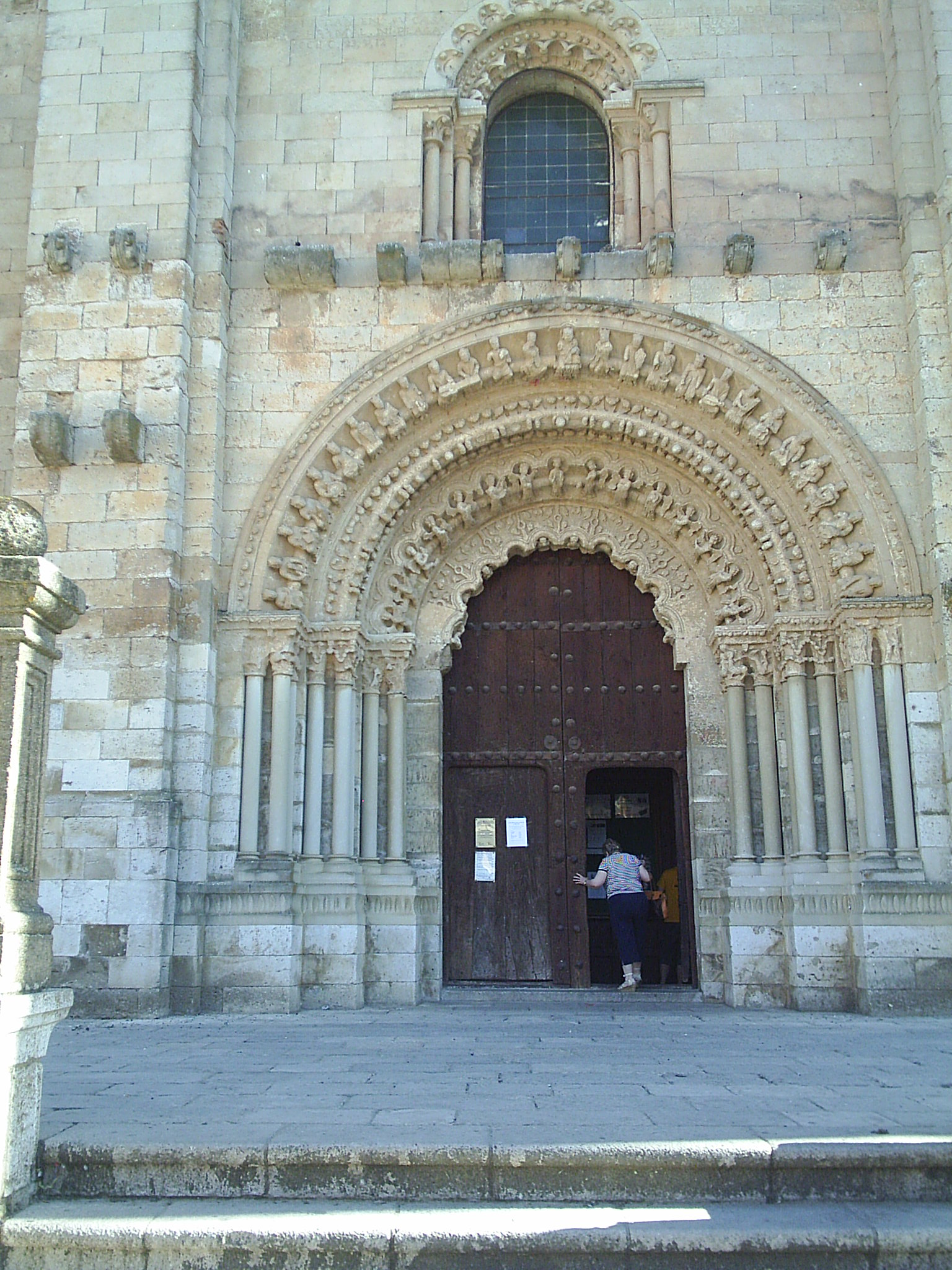
Portal of the Collegiate Church of Toro, Périgord school

In Spain geographical schools of architecture such as those in France, are not easily distinguished, because they are usually mixed with other architectural forms. However, there are a variety of buildings that can be clearly identified, if not entirely but to a large extent, as following the pattern of these French schools:

- The Auvergne School seen in the Santiago de Compostela Cathedral and the San Vicente Basilica in Avila.
- The Poitou School, with Santo Domingo de Soria and most twelfth-century Catalan churches, such as Sant Pere de Rodes and Sant Pere de Galligants.
- The Périgord School, examples of which are now part of the transition to the Gothic, such as the Toro Collegiate (except its Byzantine-influenced dome).

=== Local variations ===
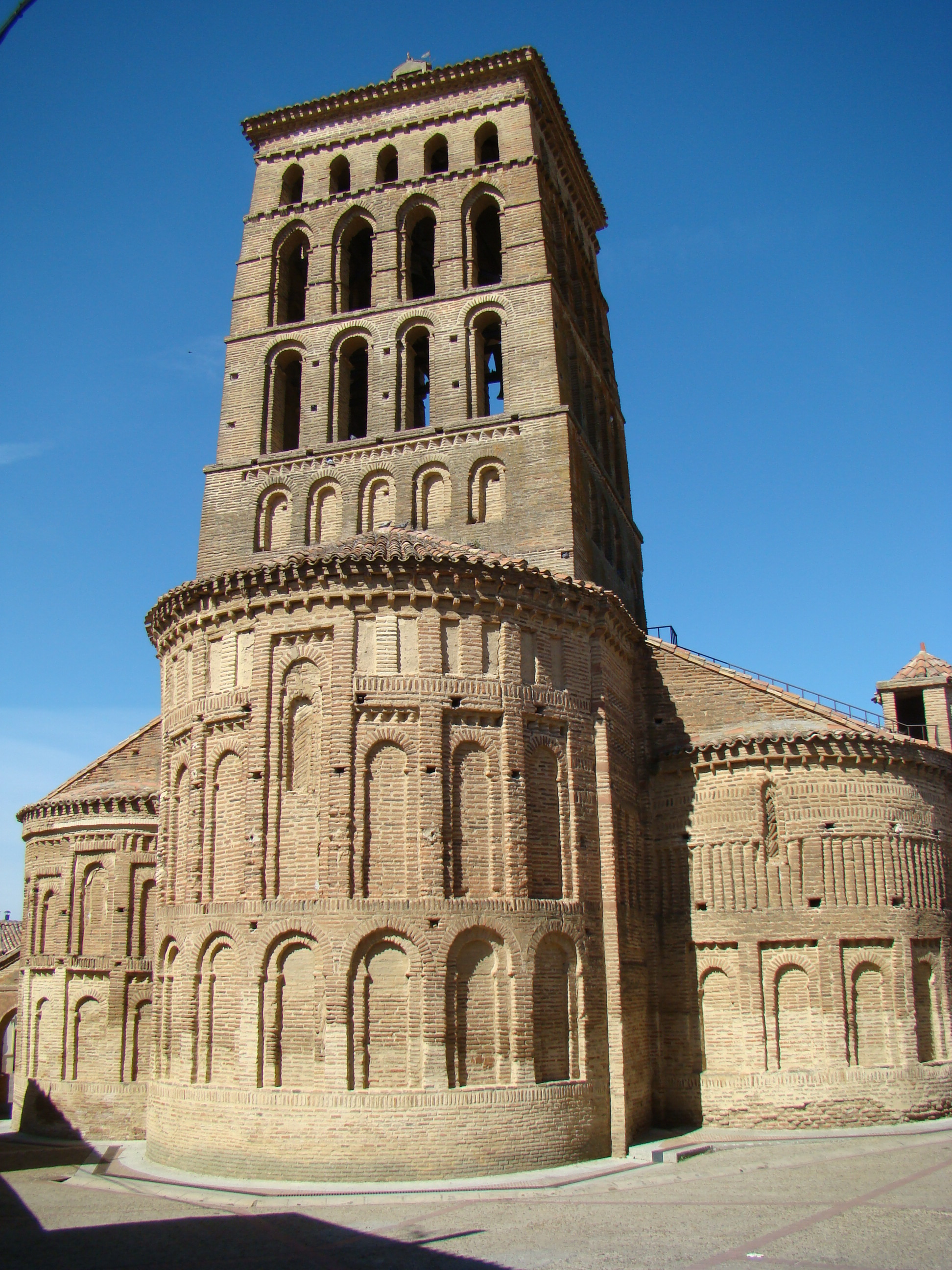
San Lorenzo church in Sahagún, in a Romanesque-Mudéjar style.

Each kingdom, region or geographic region of the peninsula, and events (such as the Camino de Santiago), marked a distinctive style influenced by the geographical environment itself, by tradition, or simply by the gangs of hired masons and builders who moved from one place to another. As a result, in Romanesque architecture in Spain there are variations such as Catalan Romanesque, Aragonese Romanesque, Palencia Romanesque, Castilian and Leónese Romanesque, among others.

Another fact to consider is the survival of the Moorish populations, who formed gangs of workers and artists who gave a special stamp to buildings. These are what is known as brick Romanesque or Moorish Romanesque.

== Romanesque periods ==
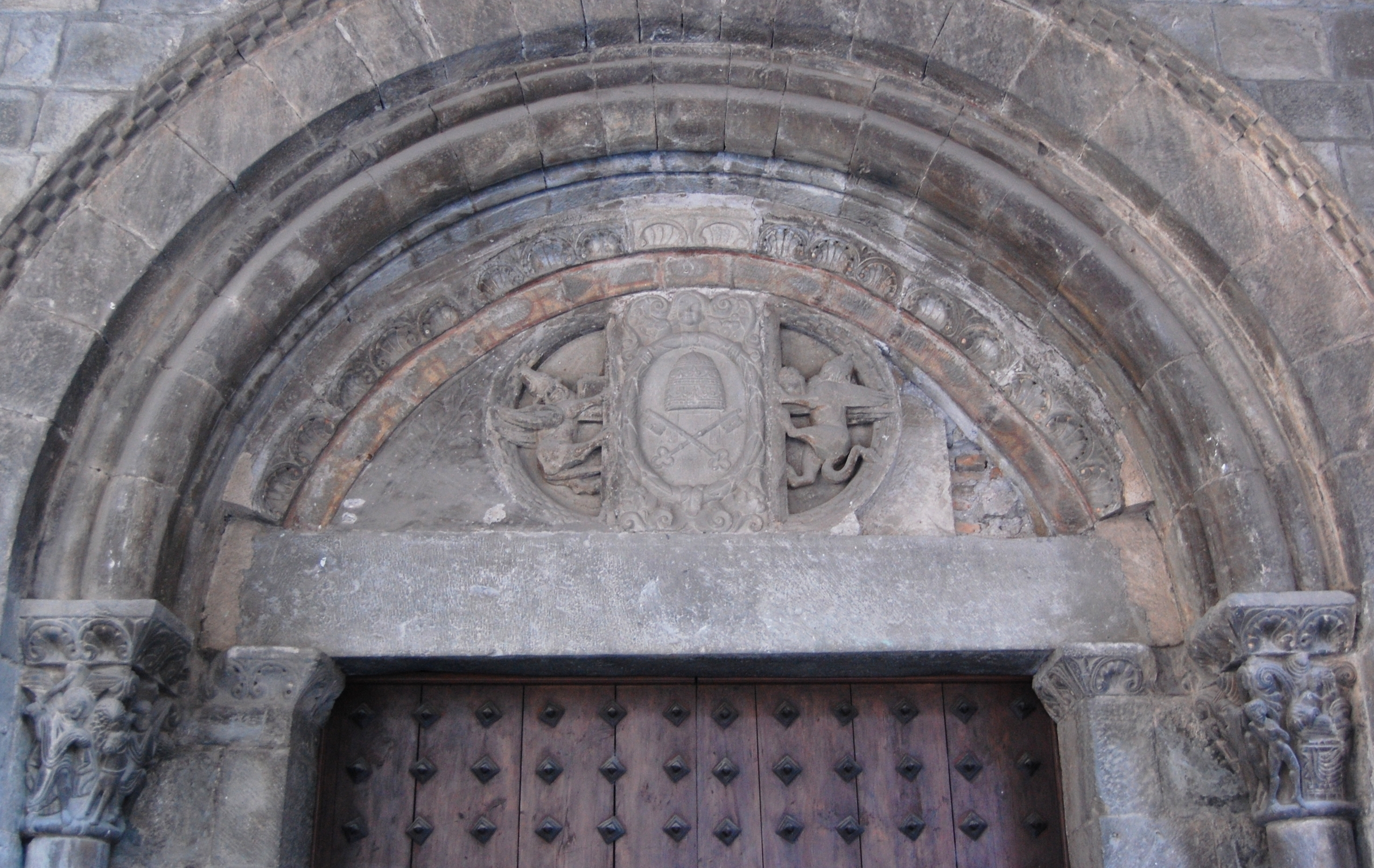
Puerta de la Lonja Chica at the Jaca Cathedral, first fully Romanesque building in Spain.

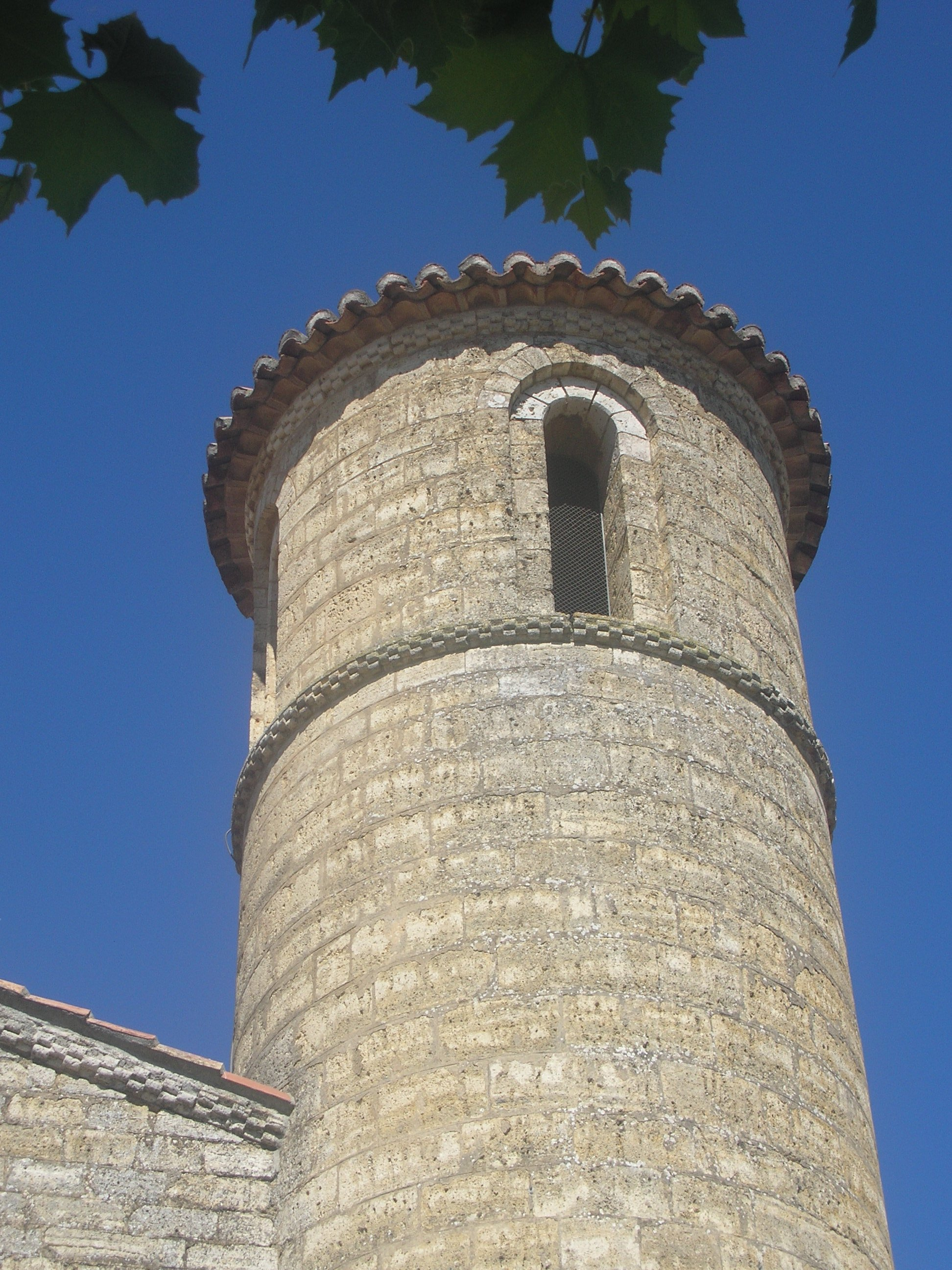
The jagged design is perfectly seen in the tower and wall of the San Martín de Tours, Fromista.

In Spain, as in the rest of the Western Christian world, Romanesque art developed over three stages with their own characteristics. Historiography has defined these stages as early Romanesque, full Romanesque and late Romanesque.

- First Romanesque: architecture comprises a well-defined geographical area that runs from northern Italy, Mediterranean France, Burgundy and Catalan and Aragonese lands in Spain. It developed from the late tenth century until the middle of the eleventh century, except in isolated locations. During this Romanesque period, there were neither miniature paintings nor monumental sculptures.
- Full Romanesque: developed from east towards Lisbon and from the south of Italy to Scandinavia. It spread, thanks to the monastic movement, the unification of the Catholic faith with the Roman liturgy and communication channels along the routes. It began its launch in the first half of the eleventh century and continued until mid-twelfth century. The best examples are in the "pilgrimage churches" (e.g. the Santiago cathedral), especially in areas of the repoblación. It is characterized by the inclusion of monumental sculptures in the portals and spandrels and for the decoration and styling of the capitals, mouldings, fascias, etc.
  The Jaca Cathedral was one of the first temples – if not the first – that was elevated with the aesthetic ideas and architecture of this Romanesque style which entered the peninsula with large French Romanesque influences. The decoration of its imposts and Romanesque arches with geometric themed checkerboard played a role in many of the buildings that were later built, giving this style the name of beleaguered or chequered Jaques.
- Late Romanesque: chronologically it was diffused from the end of the full Romanesque period until the first quarter of the thirteenth century, when it began to be succeeded by Gothic art. This period was the busiest in terms of the construction of monasteries by the Cistercian monks.

== Construction of Romanesque buildings in Spain ==
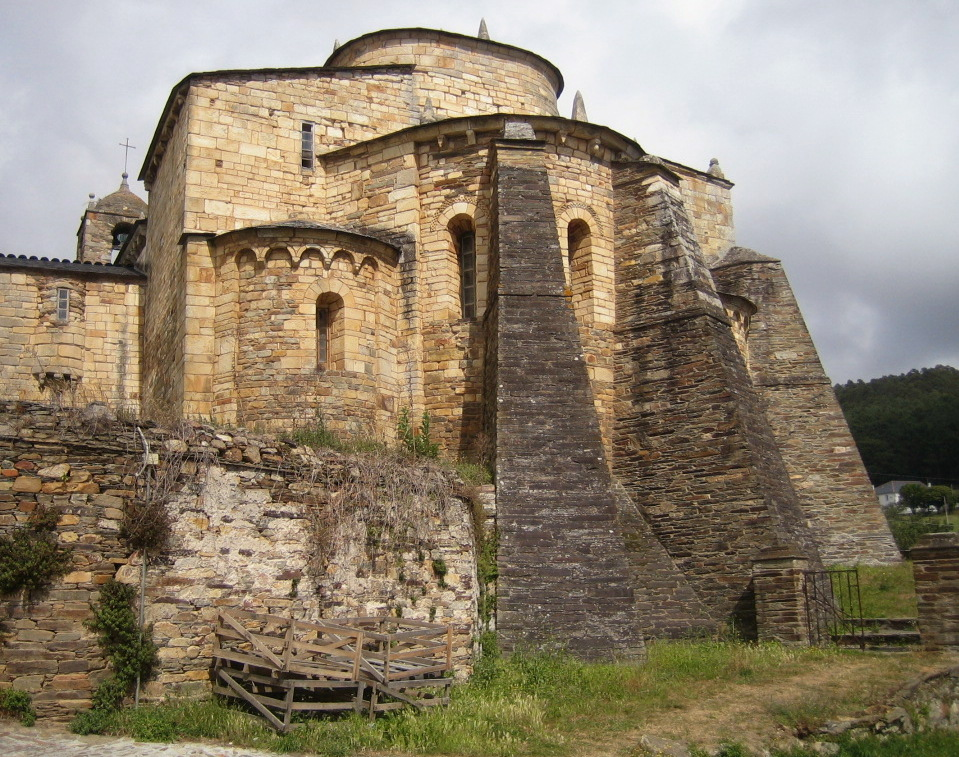
Rural Romanesque of the San Martín de Mondoñedo Church in Lugo.

Romanesque religious buildings were never as monumental as the French constructions, or the constructions that later gave rise to Gothic art. The first buildings designs had thick walls and small openings through which a dim light could enter from outside. Later there was an evolution in the construction of the walls allowing the buildings to be better lightened and for opening bigger windows.

The monastic buildings were the most numerous sharing importance with the cathedrals. Churches and parishes were constructed in cities while in small towns countless small churches, known as rural Romanesque, were built.

=== Material ===
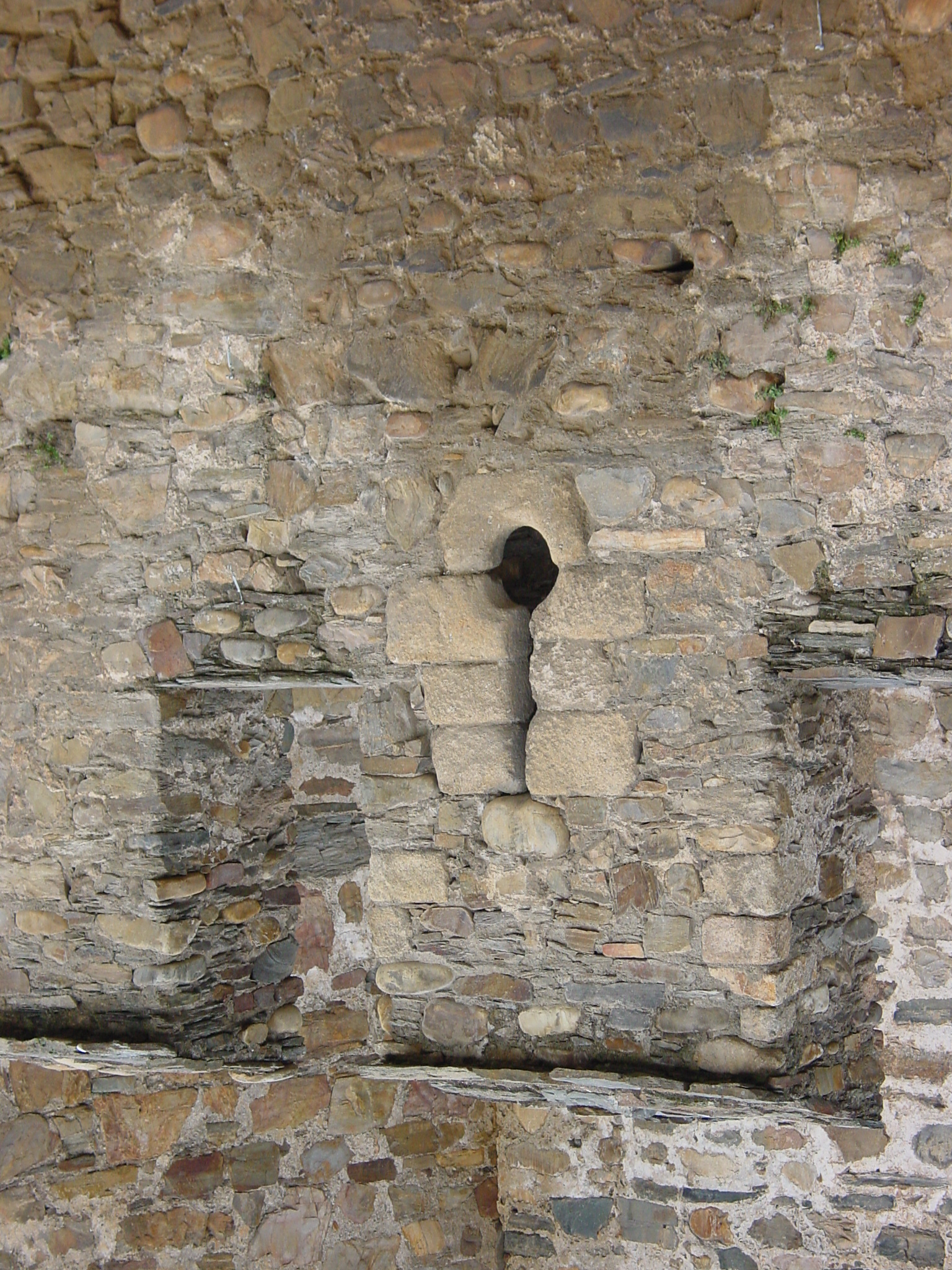
Ponferrada Castle, example of construction material.

The most precious and most expensive material was stone. The stonemasons busied themselves carving it with a chisel, always selecting the good face of the block. These were made into ashlars, which were generally available in horizontal rows and sometimes used along the edges. Hard rocks were always used. Masonry was also used, with hewn stone in the corners, windows and doors. The stones were hard to get, because the corresponding geographic location had no quarries, or it was too expensive at certain times. Then they would use baked brick, slate or any ashlars stone. Paint and plaster were used as a finish for the stone, masonry, and other materials. Once the walls were painted, it was difficult to distinguish whether it had one or the other underneath. Colorful Romanesque architecture was as widespread as it had been in Roman buildings.

=== Foundations ===
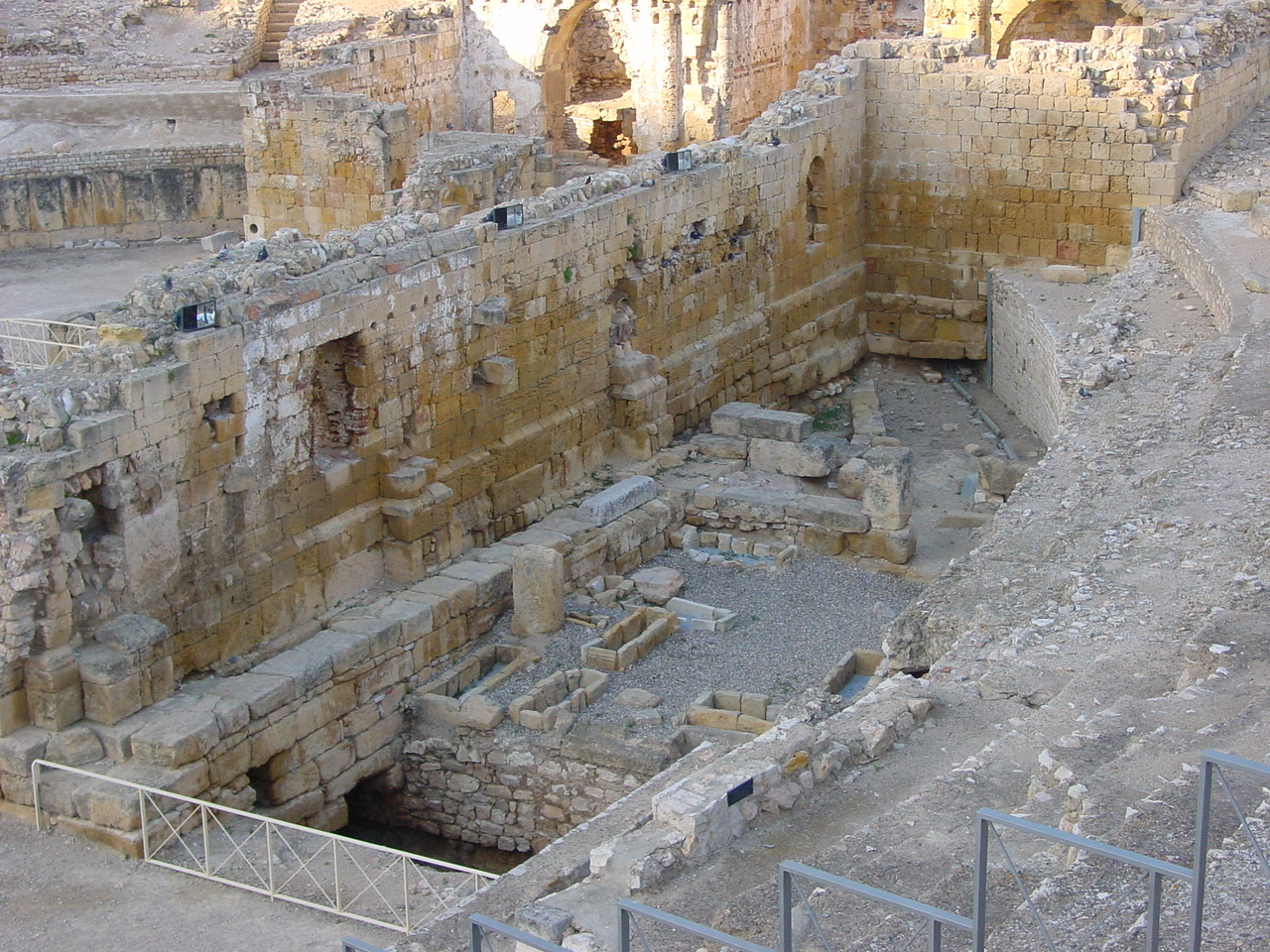
Ruins and foundations of a Romanesque basilica, Tarraco Amphitheatre.

Medieval builders did extensive study for the foundation, taking into account the type of building that was being built, the materials they were using, and the ground in which the building would stand. First deep ditches were dug and were filled with stones and rubble. Trenches were distributed under the walls that would go over them and others were made crosswise in order to join the passageways together and strengthen the pillars of the transverse arches. The foundation formed a network that practically sketched the plan of the temple, thus differing from the isolated foundation for the support of the pillars used in the Gothic style. In some ruined churches all that remains is the foundation, giving archaeologists good study material. Archaeologists are able to determine the thickness of the walls from these revealed remains of the foundations, although it is known that in this respect the builders rather exaggerated and made excessively deep trenches and overly thick foundation for fear of landslides.

=== Vaults, naves and ceilings ===
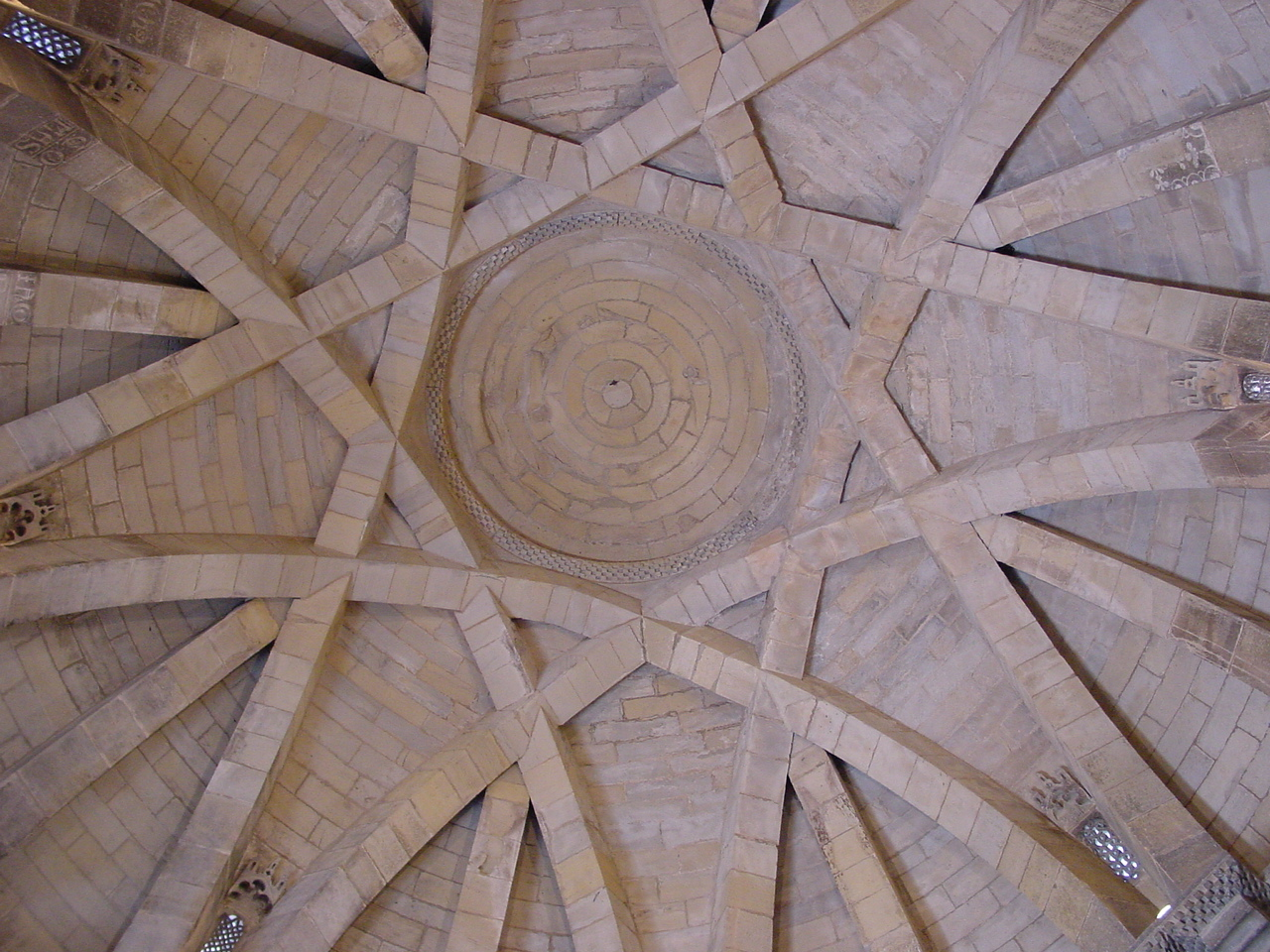
Vault of the Romanesque Torres del Río Church, Navarre.

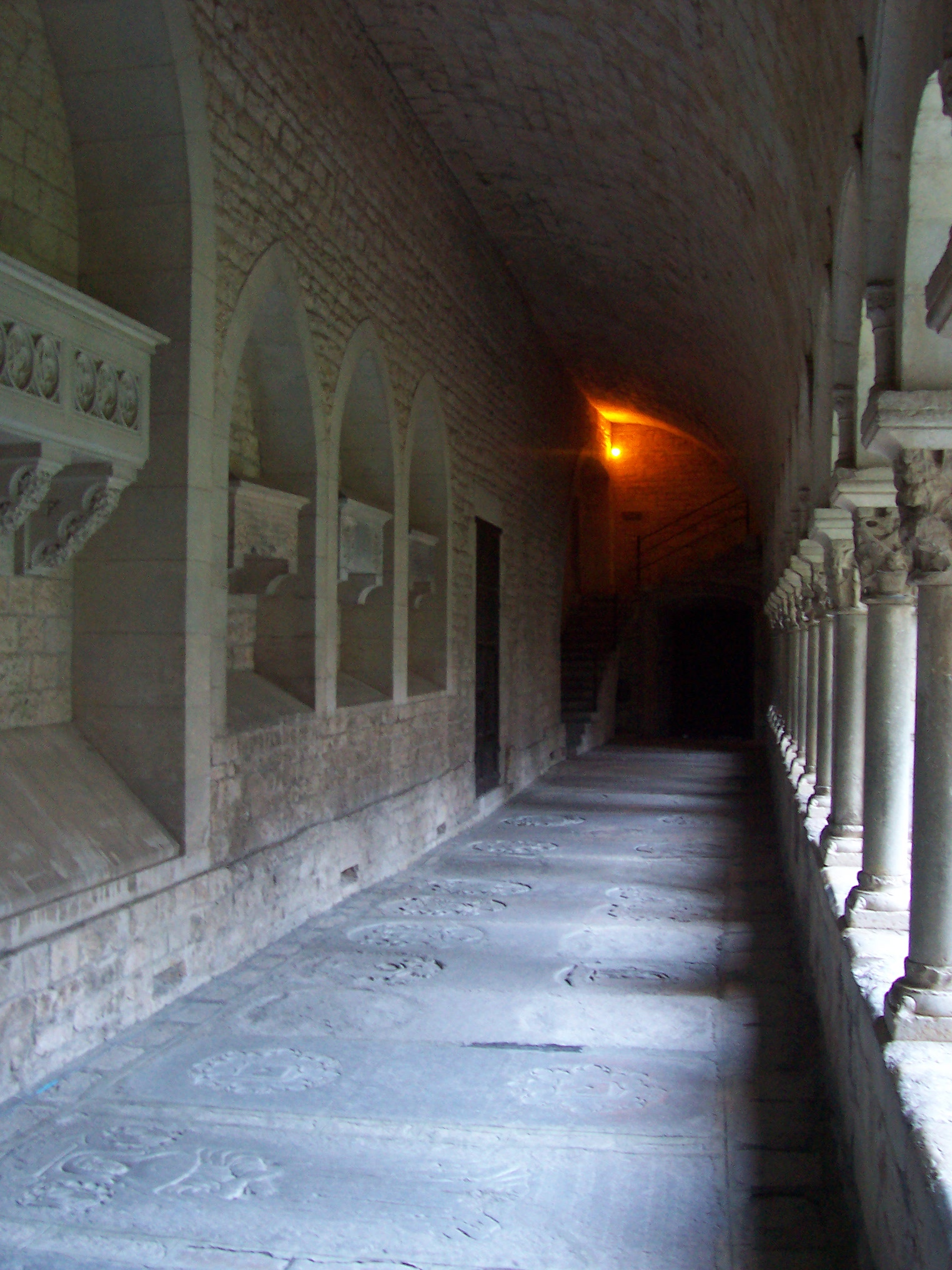
Furnace cloister vault at the Girona Cathedral.

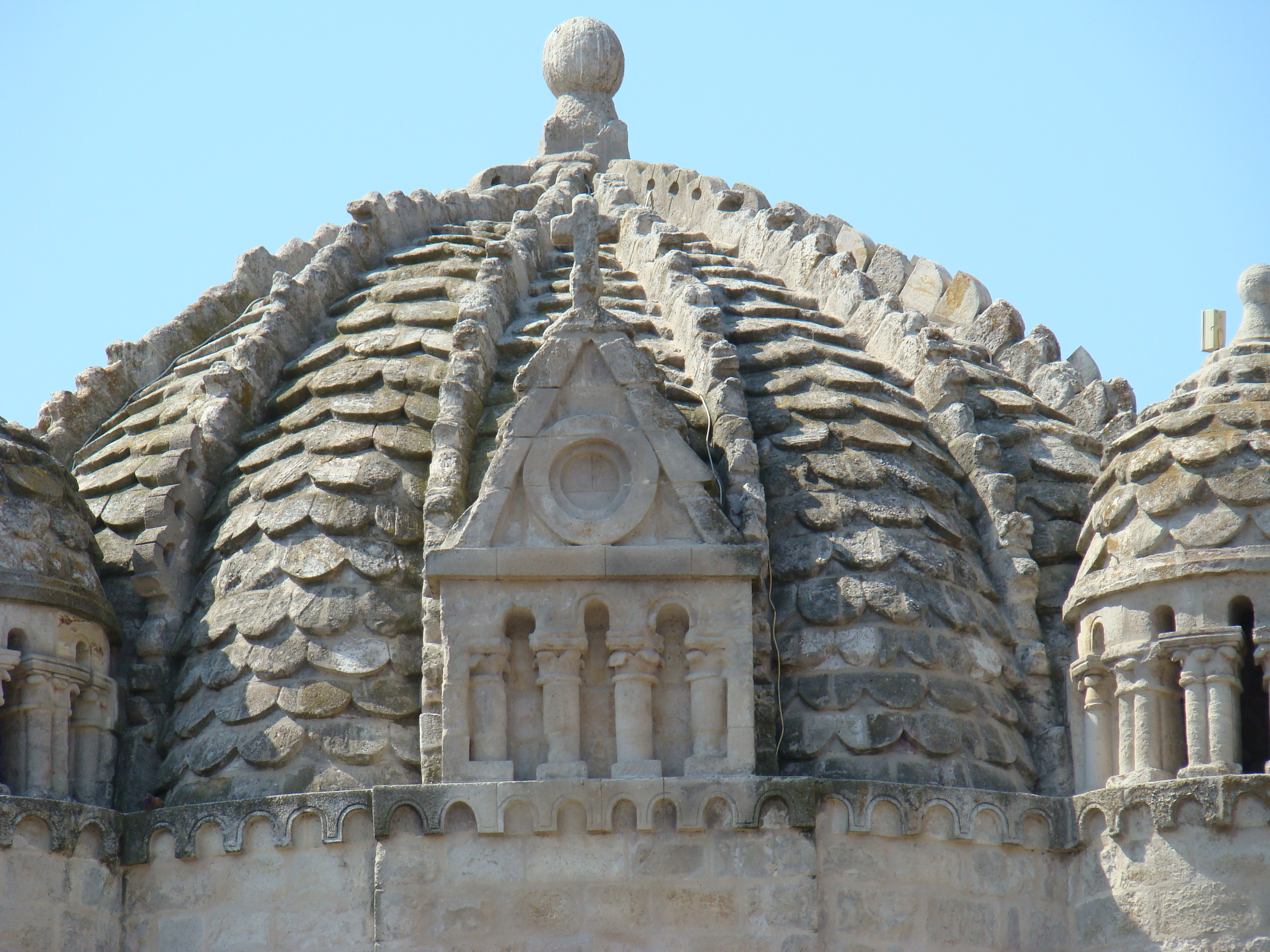
Galloned Dome, in stone, Zamora Cathedral.

During the First Romanesque period, many rural churches were still being covered with a wooden roof, like in Catalonia and in the Boi Valley where the Romanesque renewal of old churches was done by Lombard builders. He covered the gabled naves with a wooden structure, respecting the old traditions of the region. However, the apse in these churches was always topped with an oven vault.

Throughout the eleventh century, naves were covered with barrel vaults, either a half barrel or a quarter barrel, a device used in Romanesque architecture throughout Europe than later the groin vault were used. In Catalonia, these barrel vaults were used without reinforcements, while in Castile and León arches were used as support. The use of the groin vault (arising from the crossing of two perpendicular barrel vaults) had been lost and was later taken up by great master builders. The groin vault in turn gave way to the ribbed vault that became very common in Gothic architecture.

The type of vaults used exclusively on the stairs of the towers were also called helical vaults. Examples of their use are at San Martín de Fromista, Sant Pere de Galligants and San Salvador de Leyre, among others.

Corner vaults were built in the cloisters of monasteries and cathedrals. These result from the meeting of two groups in a cloister. The finishing of these vaults was not very easy, so builders had to use various tricks that ensured that flaws were not easily visible to the naked eye.

=== Arches ===
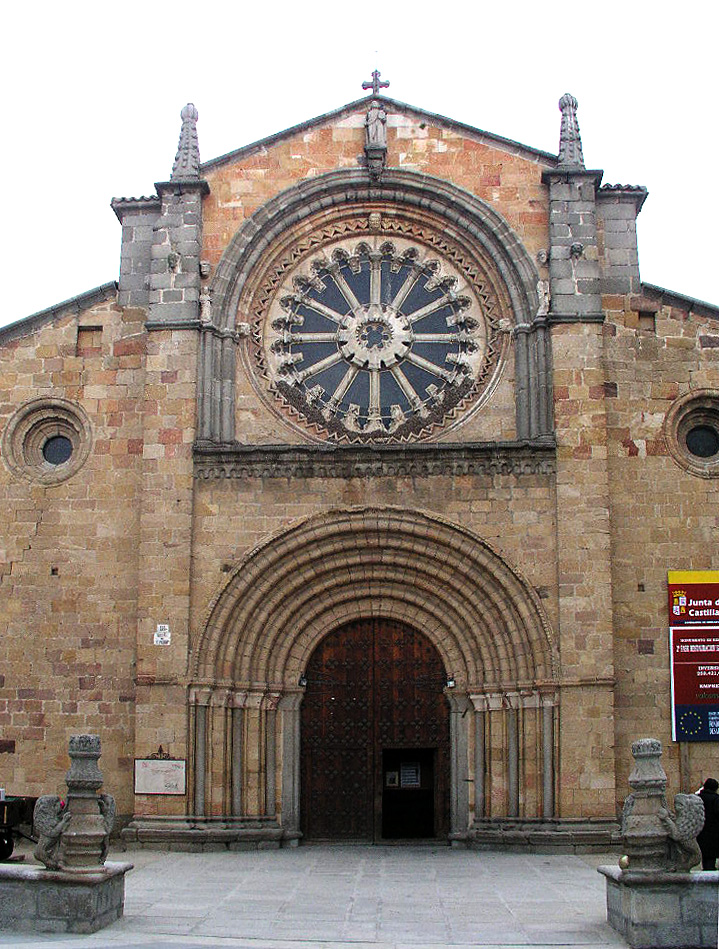
Romanesque portal with archivolts, San Pedro Church, Ávila

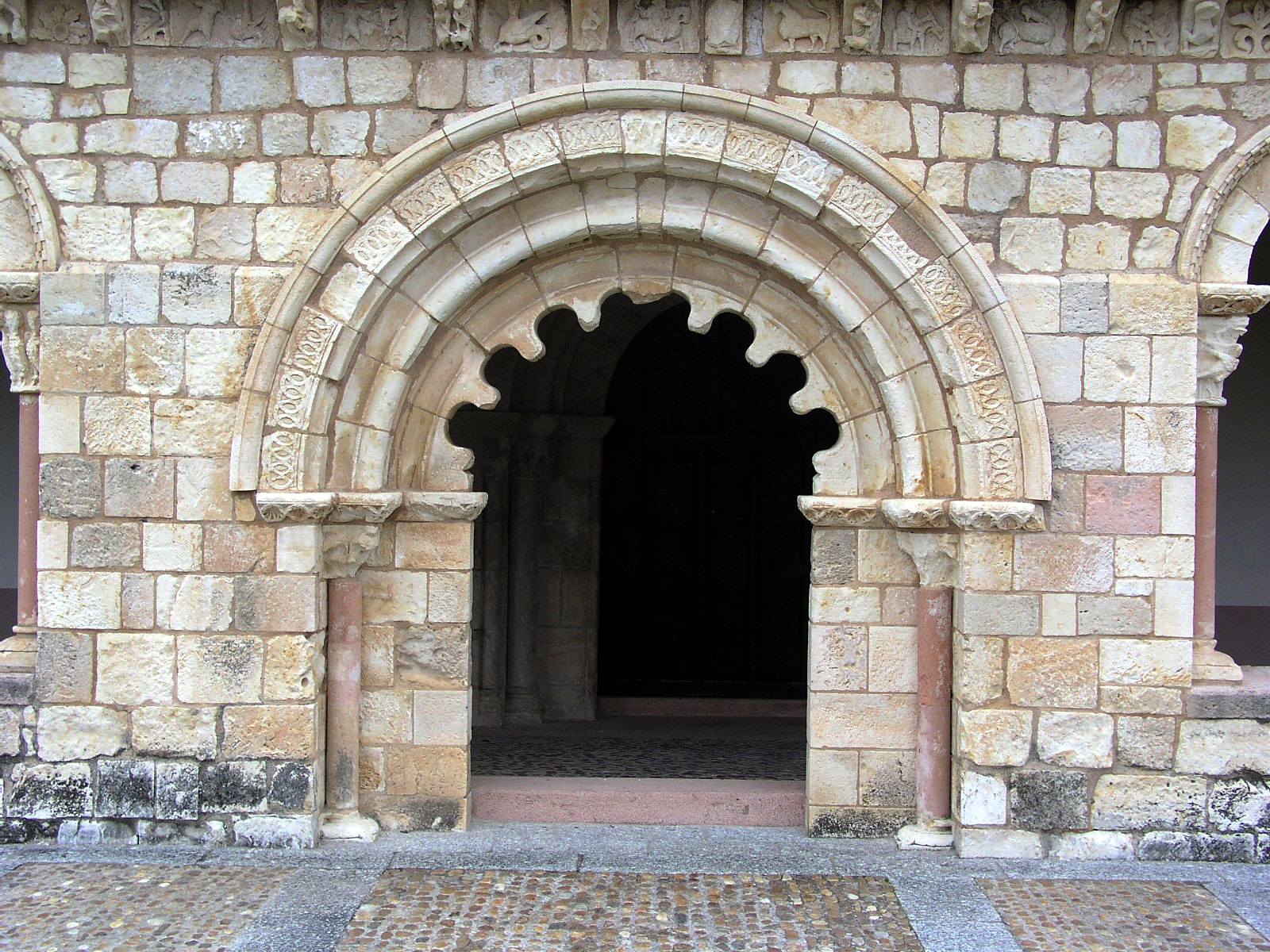
Polilobulated arc, Our Lady of the Assumption, Segovia

In Spain the most used arch was the semicircular although the horseshoe arch and the pointed arch were also used. The arch was used exclusively throughout the eleventh century and first half of the twelfth century. In order to achieve certain heights, the vaults were made quite stilted, as in Sant Joan de les Abadesses. Many arches were built doubled with the intention that they would be stronger. Later, in the portals, arches were formed with archivolts, i.e. a sequence of concentric arches decorated with simple or decorative plants or geometric mouldings.

Pointed arches came from the Orient. It is unknown the exact date of their use in Romanesque architecture in Spain, although historians proposed some dates based on buildings containing one or more pointed arches that sometimes spawn an entire vault in some of its parts. There are buildings that correspond to the first quarter of the twelfth century, such as the Lugo and Santa Maria de Terrassa cathedrals. The early use of these arches became a construction element which provided many advantages. It was an architectural breakthrough that the Cistercian monks were able to see from the beginning.

=== Buttresses ===
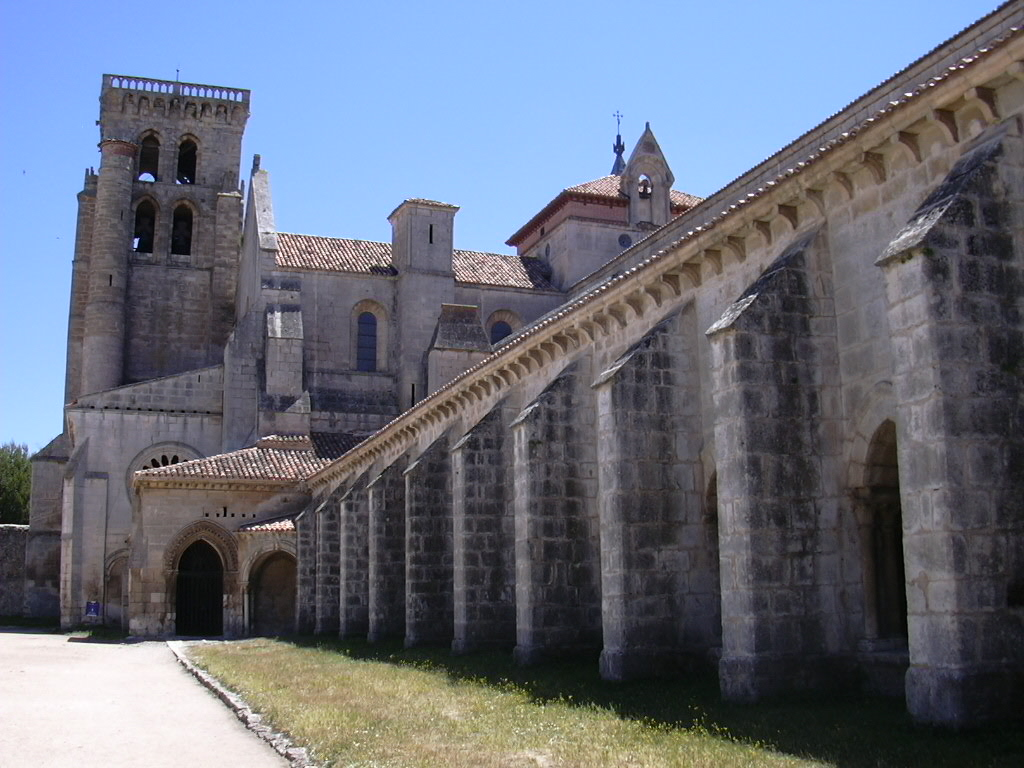
Buttresses. Santa María la Real de Las Huelgas Monastery in Burgos

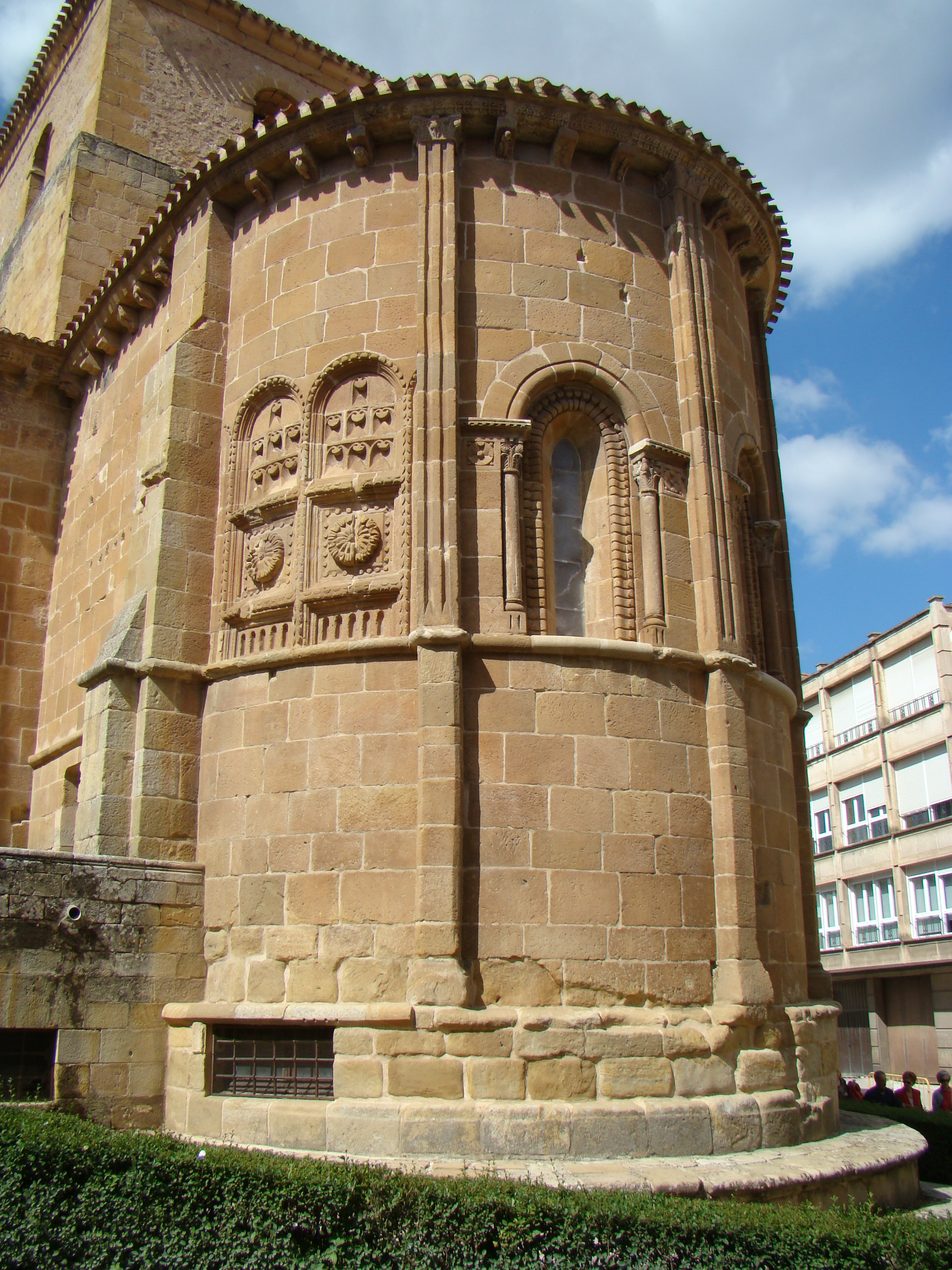
Buttress of fluted pilasters with capitals, Church of San Juan de Rabanera, Soria

Buttresses are continuous thick vertical walls that are placed at the sides of an arch or vault to counteract attacks. They were also placed on the outer walls of the naves of churches or cloisters. In Romanesque architecture they are visible is one of the elements that characterize it, especially in Spanish architecture, except in the Catalonia area where construction was done adopting a greater thickness of the walls.

=== Covers ===
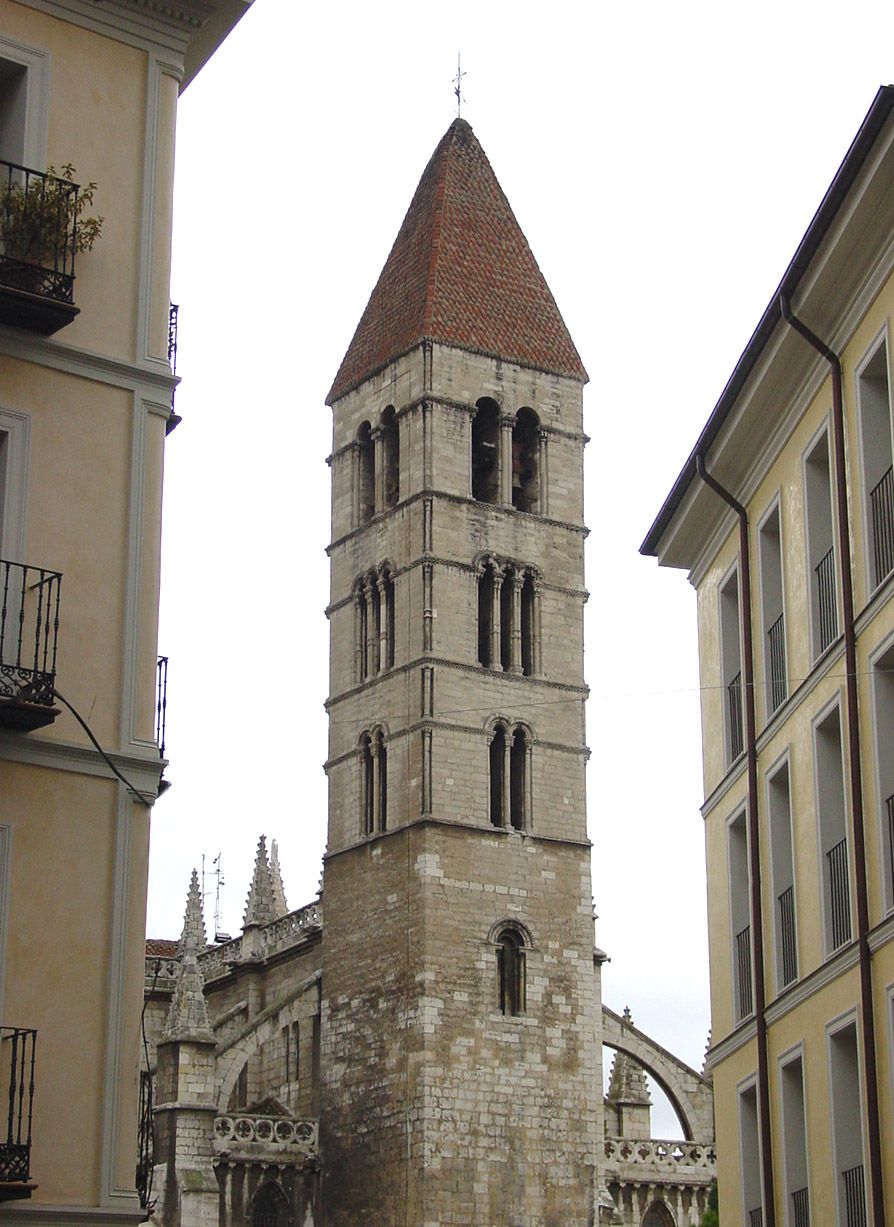
Romanesque tower of the La Antigua church in Valladolid.

The buildings were covered with a roof that could be made of different materials:

- Stone (used frequently) - These covers can still be seen in the Gallo tower of the old of Salamanca cathedral and the Ávila Cathedral.
- Roof tile - It is capable of being changed frequently, the material resists weathering over time.
- Glazed sheets (rare materials) - It is located in the spire of the tower of the former Valladolid.
- Slate - It was used in areas where the material was abundant, like in Galicia.

=== Towers ===
In Spanish buildings towers are located in different parts of the church: on the sides, over the transept and, in very special cases, over the straight section of the apse, as in the churches of the city of Sahagún in León. This placement was because, being built of brick, a material less consistent than stone, the builders had to locate the towers in the strongest, more resistant section, usually at the apses. A façade made up of two towers was not very common and usually seen only in temples of great importance.

Towers served as steeples, especially in the Romanesque styles in Castile and León, they are what are called Turres signorum. In many cases they were built as defense towers, especially in border territories experiencing military conflict, and the location of the tower depended on what was being defended. Thus, the tower of the church of the Silos monastery was located to defend the monastery, the tower of the San Pedro de Arlanza monastery was a very important defense for the entire area. The military aspect of these Romanesque towers evolved and changed over time so that at present it is difficult to guess at their original purpose or purpose for which they were used in other eras. In many cases these towers were attached to the sides of the church, and some even completely independent of the churches.

=== Bell-gables ===
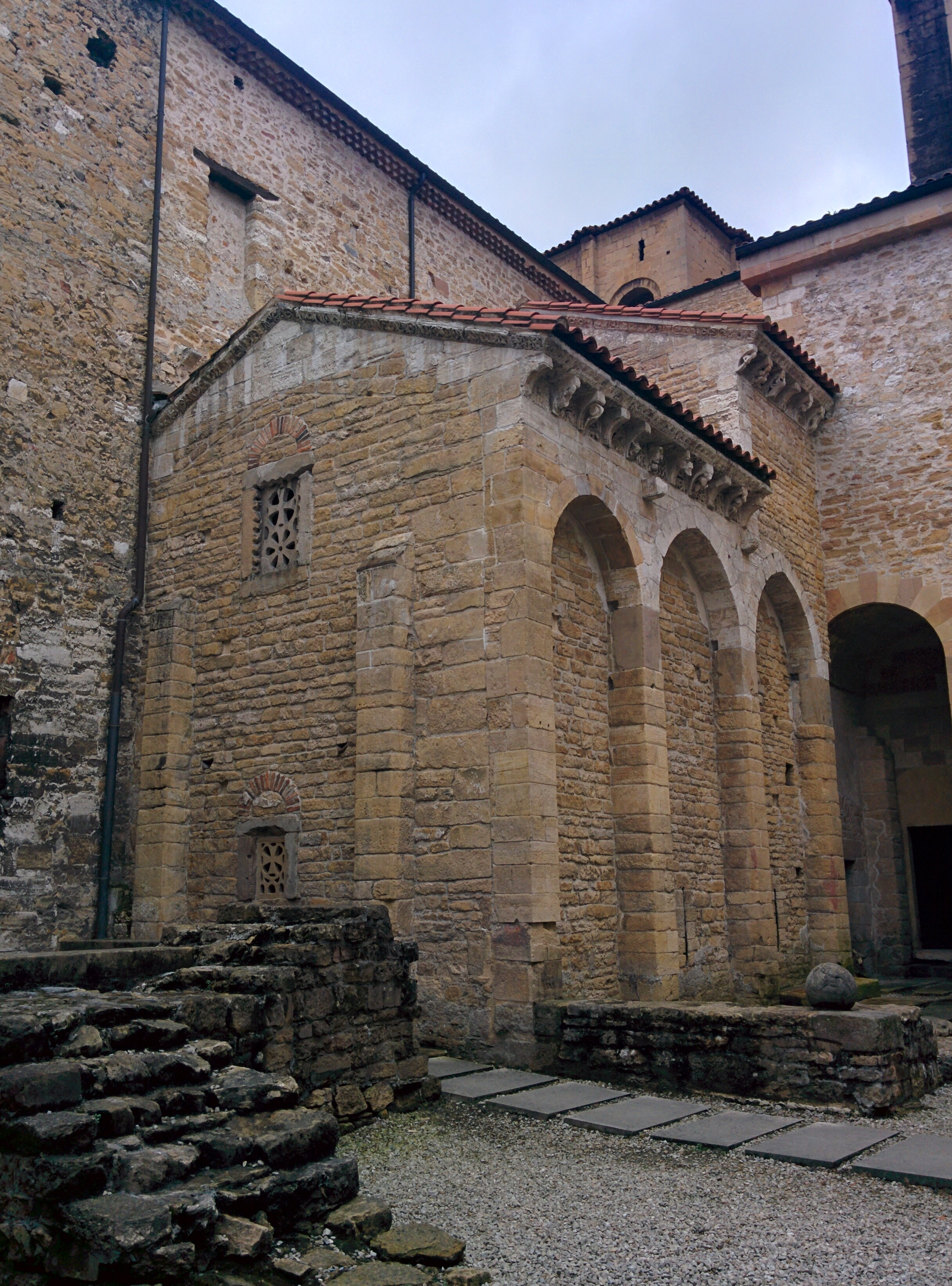
Cámara Santa in Oviedo.

A gable is an architectural element that is usually built on the façade and used to house the bells. The bell-gable (referred to as espadaña in the Iberian Peninsula) was built as a vertical continuation of the wall and the spans were opened to receive the bells and it was easier and cheaper to build. In Spanish Romanesque they were very numerous especially in smaller rural Romanesque churches. They were made of a single span or several terraced storeys. They usually had pointed or pinion tops.

There are all kinds of gables in the Romanesque style of Campoo and Valderredible. There are some spectacular ones in other locations such as the one at Agullana in the Alto Ampurdán or the Astudillo, with five openings. There are more modest ones such as at the Santa Maria de Valbuena Monastery where its veins have a unique placement.

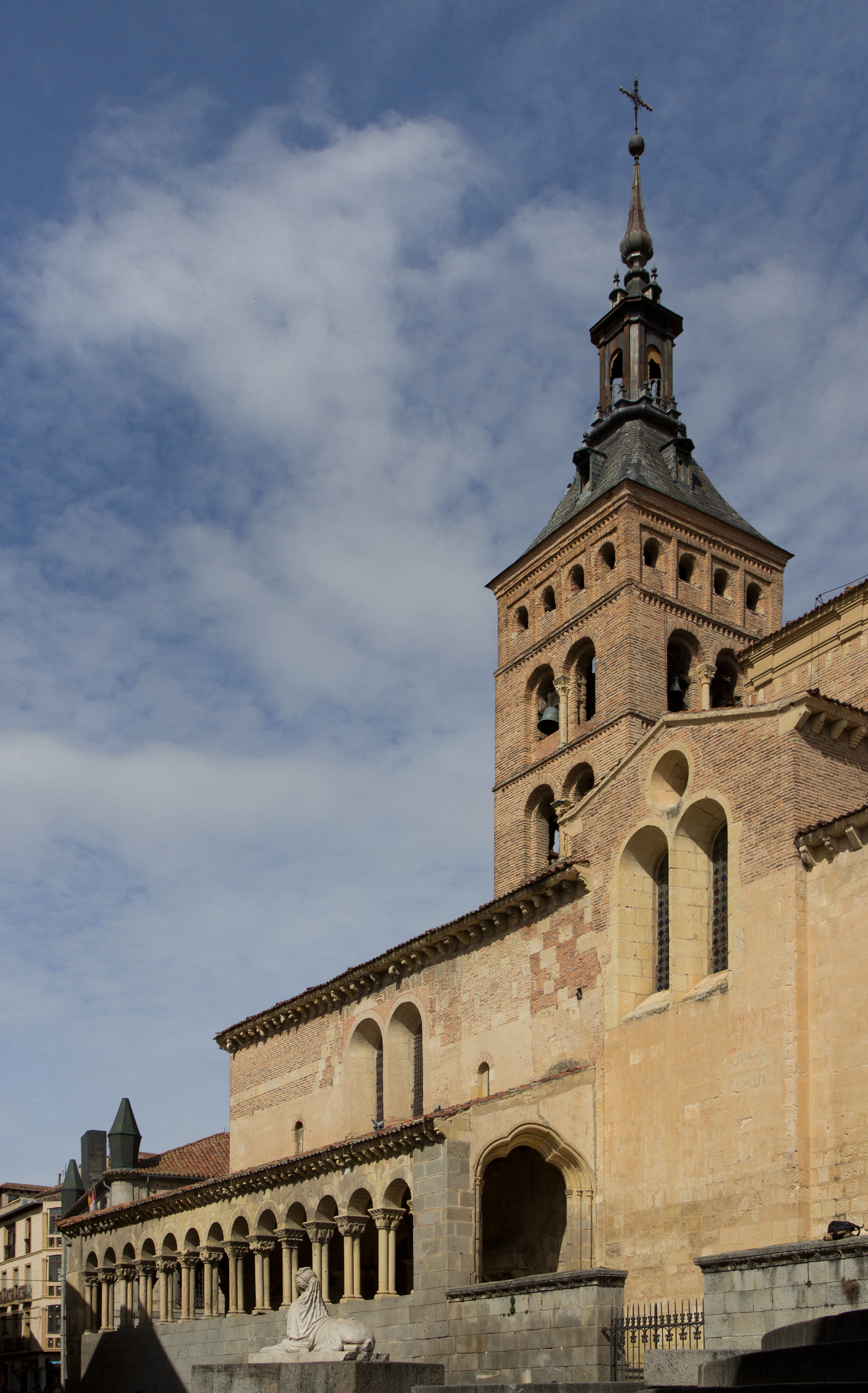
Façade of San Martín in Segovia, which has kept traces of paint into the twentieth century.

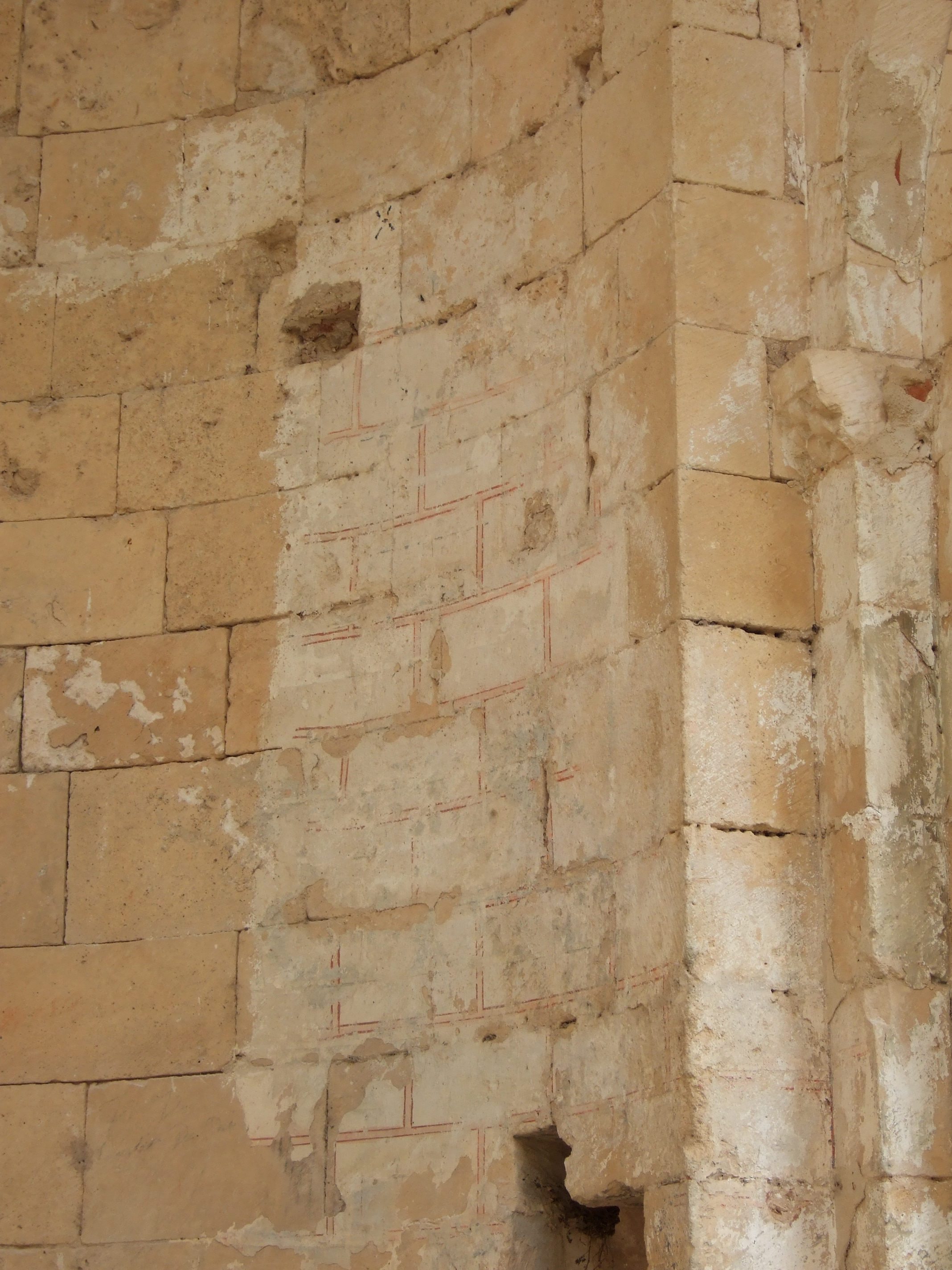
Monastery of San Pedro de Arlanza, Burgos: Traces of paint in the apse, 11th–12th century.

== Artwork ==
=== Paintings ===
During the Romanesque era, a building was not considered finished until its walls had appropriate paintings. The walls (especially the apses) were lined inside with iconographic paintings, many have come down within the twenty-first century, such as those belonging to churches in the Tahull Valley. The walls, both inside and out, were covered with a layer of paint in one color and the imposts, veins and columns were highlighted in the original material, but sometimes they were also painted in bright colors: green, yellow, ocher, red and blue. Also, Cistercian and Premonstratensians monks painted the walls of their churches, in white or a light earthy color, and they sometimes outlined the joints of the blocks. This custom of painting or revoking the buildings was not new to the Romanesque of the Middle Ages but represented the continuity of the construction method from olden times. The material used was stone, ashlar, or if the masonry was in bricks, the finish was a painted surface. Thus, in many cases it could not be determined if the exterior was made of stone or brick, which could only be determined from plaster scrapings. The paint finish gave the buildings protection against environmental assaults, but these were removed in the nineteenth century when theories were applied to expose the original building materials.

Some of these paintings have remained in certain buildings, as a testimony of the past, on walls, sculptures and capitals. On the façade of the San Martín de Segovia Church, traces of paint were still visible into the twentieth century, as witnessed and described by the Spanish historian Marqués de Lozoya. Sometimes carving the baskets of the capitals was too expensive and they were left completely smooth so that the painter could finish them with floral or historical motifs. In the San Paio de Abeleda church in Ourense, there are vestiges of paintings on some capitals, which have even been repainted throughout its history. Fragments of capitals with their original painting have been found among the ruins of the San Pedro de Arlanza monastery and they give an indication of how the rest was decorated.

=== Sculptures ===
Sculptures are used as decoration for buildings during the Romanesque period, it was considered a necessity. It embellished the church and was used for educational purposes for the common people that couldn't read. Architecture and sculpting represented an inseparable iconographical program. The idea of the Church (an idea developed and disseminated by the Benedictines of Cluny), was to teach Christian doctrine through the sculptures and paintings of the apses and interior walls. The capitals of the columns, the spandrels, the friezes, the cantilevers and the archivolts of the portals were intricately decorated with stories of the Old and New Testaments. These sculptures were of religious depictions, covered a number of profane, and important issues to the eleventh- and twelfth-century population such as field work, the calendar (as in the case of the capitals of the Santa María la Real de Nieva cloister, from late Romanesque), war, customs, and more. For other buildings real, mythological and symbolic animals were sculpted, plus allegories of vices and virtues. An example is the erotic corbels of the San Pedro de Cervatos Collegiate in southern Cantabria. These decorations were not just of a historical or animal's type but also of geometric decoration that were important at the beginning of the period that were floral and plant decoration. Often the carved tympanum or the frieze depicted a series of images along the capitals of the columns of the archivolts.

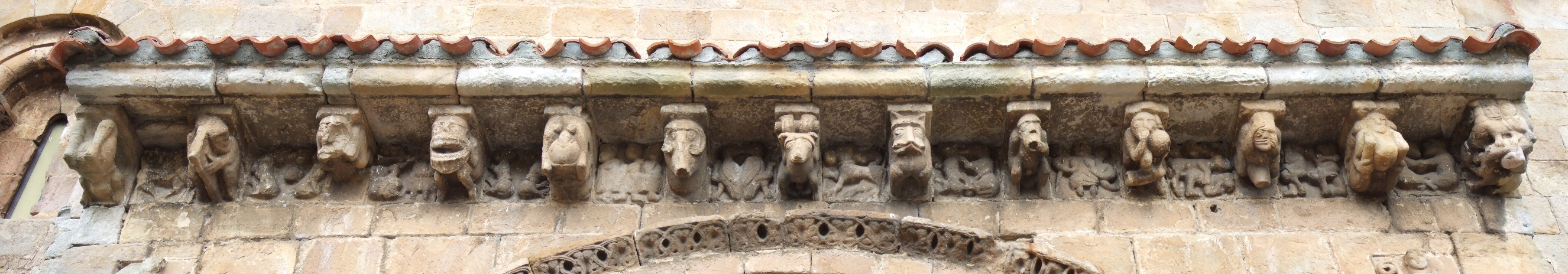
The roof of the San Pedro de Cervatos Collegiate Church is supported by corbels.

=== Cloisters and Facades ===
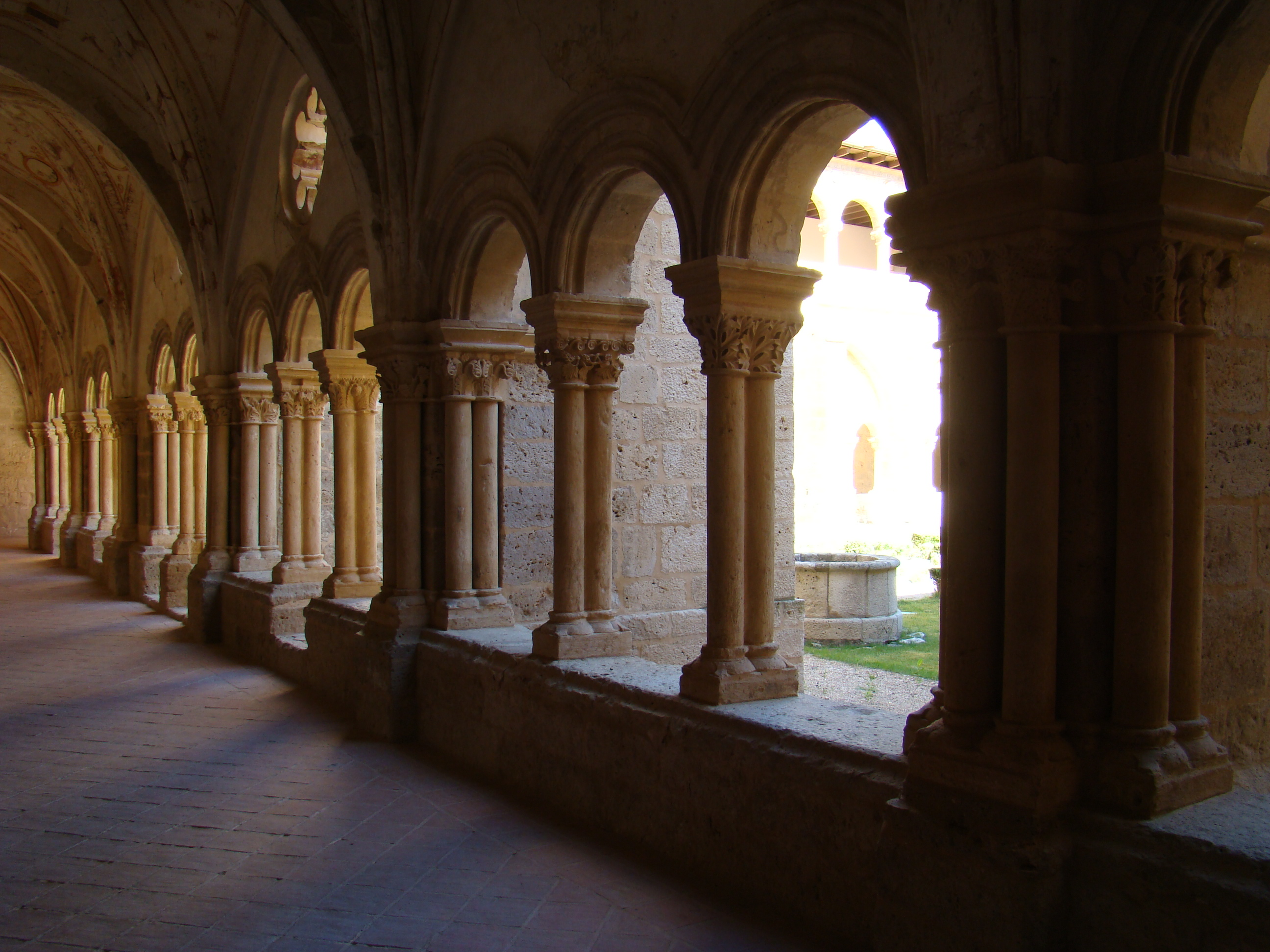
Romanesque cloister in the Santa María de Valbuena monastery, Valladolid.

The cloister is an architectural unit usually built next to cathedrals and monastic churches, attached to the north or south. The cloister par excellence is the one promulgated by the Benedictine monks. The different units of the cloister, hinged on all four sides of a square courtyard, were dedicated to the service of the life of the community. In Spanish Romanesque many of these cloisters have been preserved, in the Catalan region.

The facade is the divide between the real world and the spirit world that portray doctrinal themes in relation to penitence like the subject of salvation that refers to the Ascension and the Transfiguration. The influence of the facade spread all along the Road of Santiago.

== Churches ==
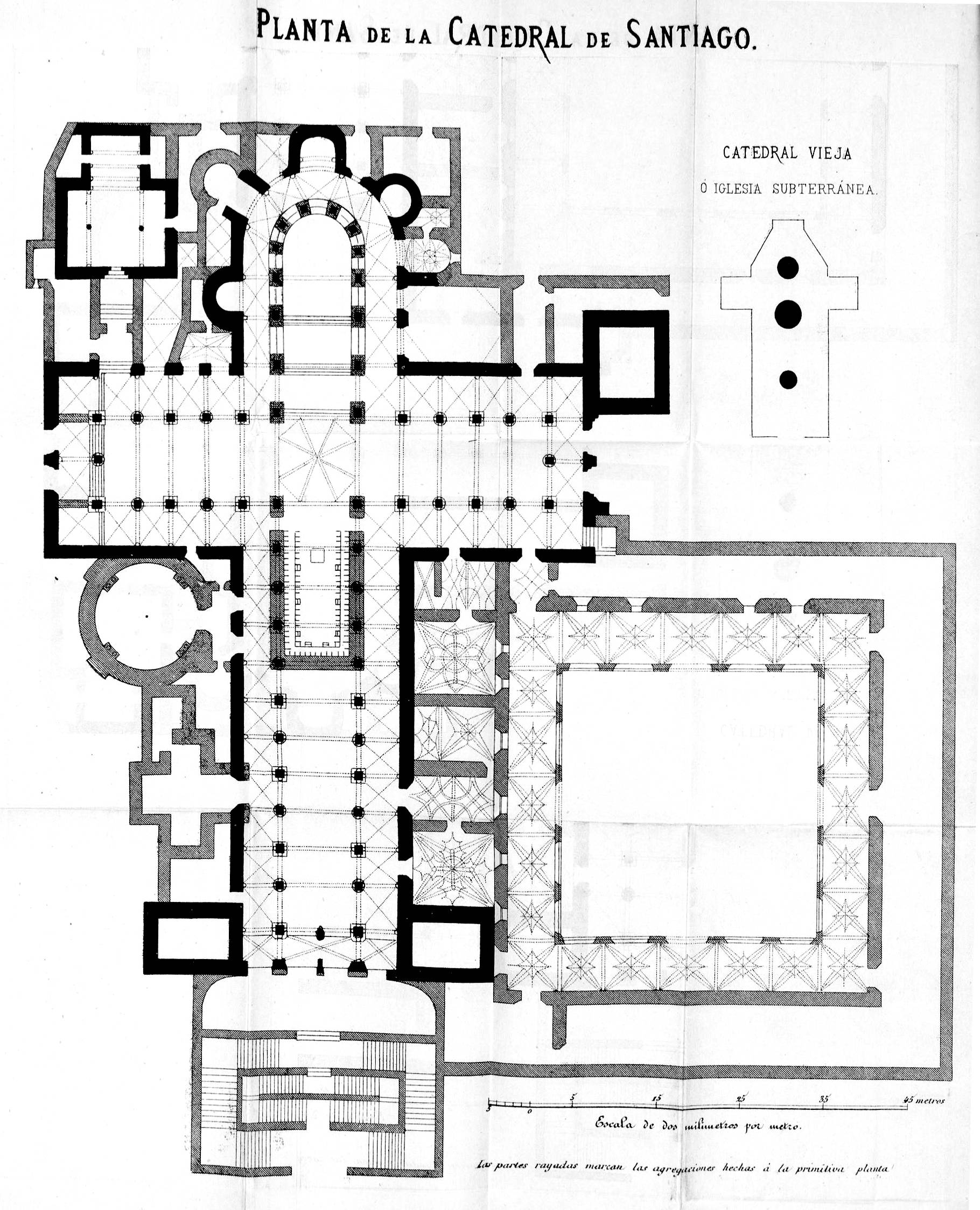
Floor plan of the Santiago de Compostela Cathedral.

The temples of the First Romanesque are simple, with a single nave topped by a semicircular apse without a transept. The prototype of the Romanesque church was non-rural, medium-sized and with the floor plan of a basilica with three naves containing three semicircular apses and a transept. Throughout the twelfth century the traditional Hispanic type temples with three straight and terraced apses were still being built in some areas like in the city of Zamora. Church plans were adapted to the liturgical needs, as the number of canons or friars who required more altars for their religious functions was increasing. Temples were built with Benedictine Cluny-style apses which is a long transept that could accommodate more apses that was adopted in Cistercian architecture, and there are more examples of this type of construction. This feature was also adopted by the cathedrals (Tarragona, Lleida, Ourense and Sigüenza). There are also examples of cruciform structures that depict a Latin cross, such as the eleventh-century Santa Marta de Tera church in Zamora, or the San Lorenzo de Zorita del Páramo church in Palencia, whose header is not square but semicircular. There are also circular plans, with a single nave such as the San Marcos church in Salamanca, or the Vera Cruz church in Segovia.

=== Vestry ===
In the Romanesque era small churches or parish churches did not have vestries. Vestries were only added to churches beginning in the sixteenth century. However, in the grand monasteries or cathedrals there was a space adapted in the cloister for this purpose.

=== Crypts ===
In the First Romanesque, the use of crypts spread due to the influence of the Franks. They were spaces were built just below the top of the church and were intended for keeping the relics of martyrs, the worship of whom came about from Carolingian influence. They usually had three naves with a groin vault cover, with variations, such as the circular crypt with a pillar in the center in Cuixá and Sant Pere de Rodes. Throughout the eleventh century, they began to lose importance as recipients of relics and were instead built for practical and necessary architectural purposes, adapting to the terrain on which the church was built like the Monastery of Leyre crypt. Throughout the twelfth century, fewer crypts were being built and those that were built were for the uneven ground. Later the crypts were converted to be used for funerary purposes.

=== Tribunes ===
The tribunes were galleries over the aisles that were used by important people to monitor the liturgy. They had little importance in Romanesque Spain, with their construction being very scarce. Two examples are known: the San Vicente de Avila and the Basilica of San Isidoro. Traditional historiography suggests that, in the latter church, the tribune was a special place for Queen Sancha, wife of Ferdinand I, but more recent studies show that the dates do not match. There is little information on this architecture.

=== Triforia ===
A triforium is a gallery with arches running along the top of the lower naves of a church, below the large windows of the main nave and it sometimes surrounds the apse at the same height. Its origin was purely cosmetic, since if the nave was too high there was a heavy space between the ceiling windows and the supporting arches of the lower lateral naves. At first the arch of the triforium was not set, but it was then thought that it could be used to provide light and ventilation, while leaving a passage for building services and surveillance. This construction could be done because the aisles are always pushed into the central nave, thus leaving a usable hole of the same depth as the width of the aisle. This element had its true development in the Gothic era. In Spanish Romanesque architecture triforia are scarce because the bare wall was usually left in their place, or a blind arcade was built.

An example of a triforium is in the Santiago de Compostela cathedral where the aisle of the cathedral has two floors and the triforium occupies the entire second, covering the entire building and lining the outside by a series of windows that provide light and interior arches. Another example is in the Lugo Cathedral, where it runs along all the walls. Lastly in San Vicente de Ávila the triforium is a dark gallery that does not provide light from outside. In some pilgrimage churches the triforium was at times used as an area for overnight accommodation for pilgrims.

=== Porticos and galleries ===
The portico is a space originally designed for preventing inclement weather. It was constructed in both rural and city churches, in front of the main door to protect it. In most cases they were made with a wooden structure that stood the test of time, but in most cases the construction was in stone resulting in galleries of great development, which were true works of art. The porticos were reminiscent of the narthex of the Latin basilicas. It formed an advanced body over the central part of the main façade and if this façade had towers, then it occupied the space between them, as in the Portico of Glory in Santiago de Compostela cathedral. At other times it occupied the entire front, forming a covered space that was called a "Galilee".

=== Rose windows ===
Rose windows are circular windows made of stone, whose origin is in the Roman oculus of the basilicas. In Spain these rose windows were employed from the eleventh century. Throughout the Romanesque, rose windows became important and increased in size, culminating in the Gothic era.

The cloister is an architectural unit usually built next to cathedrals and monastic churches, attached to the north or south. The cloister par excellence is the one promulgated by the Benedictine monks. The different units of the cloister, hinged on all four sides of a square courtyard, were dedicated to the service of the life of the community. In Spanish Romanesque many of these cloisters have been preserved, in the Catalan region.

== Civil Architecture ==
The civil architecture in the Romanesque period is almost unheard of although some retain parts of the foundation of the Romanesque era like doors or semicircular window.

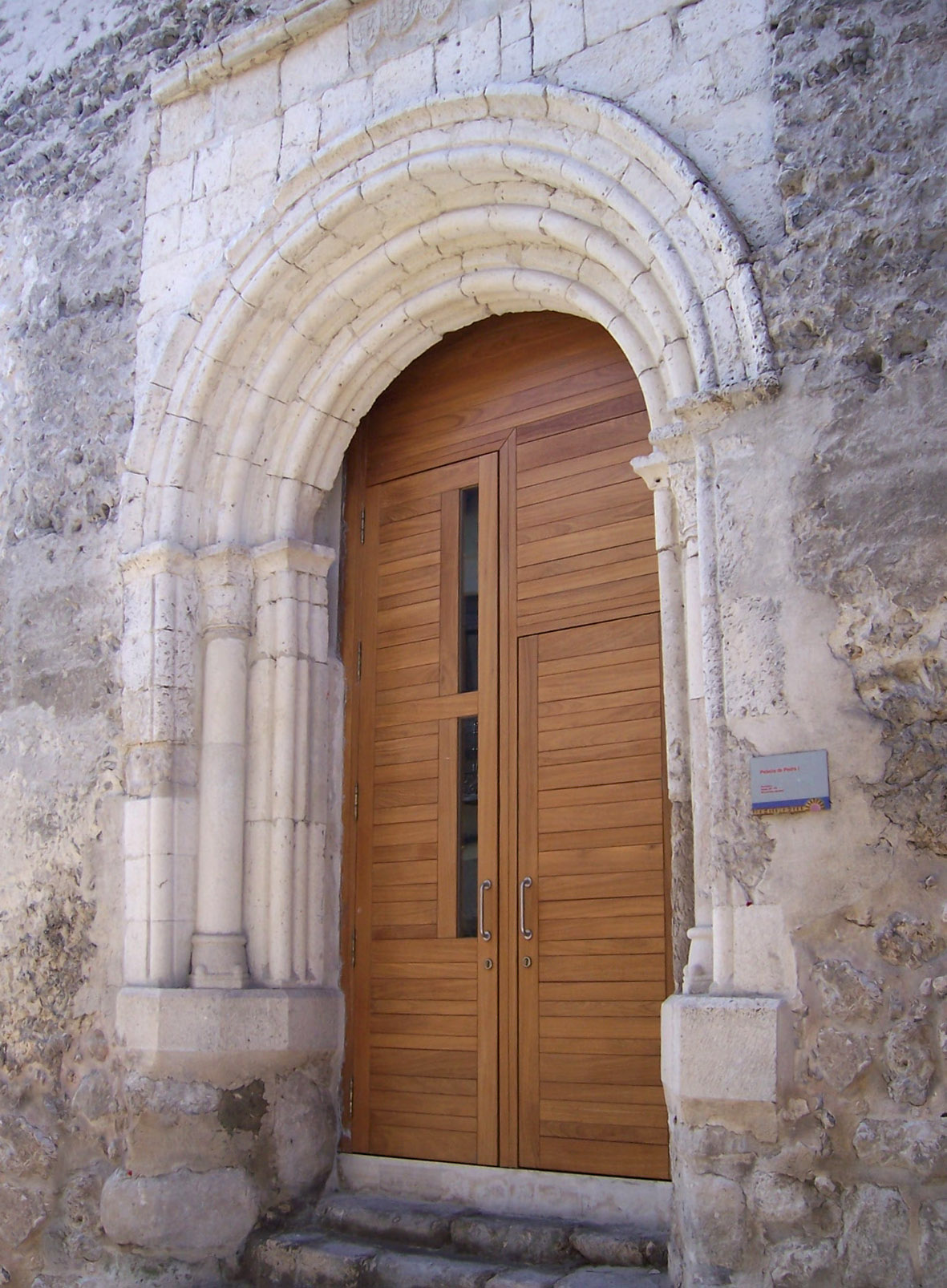
Romanesque portal of the palace of Peter the Cruel in Cuéllar.

Domestic buildings, including palaces, had no great pretensions. Houses were built of flimsy material and were unable to stand the test of time. When they wished to give importance to these civil architectures, they were transformed, and they were built with Gothic tendencies. So, it was with the so-called Romanesque palace of Diego Gelmírez in Santiago de Compostela, which is actually a totally Gothic factory, or buildings of Segovia sinecures from the Middle Ages.

The Romanesque palace is the famous palace of Dona Berenguela in the city of Leon but its structure and planning actually correspond to the last years of the late Middle Ages. Although it does retain some of the Romanesque style windows. Also, in Cuéllar, the Palace of Peter the Cruel, the origin of which is supposed to date from the time of the Repoblación. Part of its foundations is Romanesque, but the current building is from the early fourteenth century, even though it has a Romanesque portal that was perhaps inherited from the previous building or was reused. This palace is however considered as one of the few examples of civil Romanesque. Traditionally, buildings that have a good portal with a semicircular arch and large segments have been called "Romanesque" stylized houses or palaces, but they are actually structures from the Gothic era. An example of what could be a Romanesque palace built in stone is seen in the façade of the Palace of the Kings of Navarre in Estella, Navarre.

== See also ==
- Spanish Romanesque
- Romanesque churches in Madrid
- List of Romanesque buildings

== Bibliography ==
- Alcalde Crespo, Gonzalo. Iglesias rupestres. Olleros de Pisuerga y otras de su entorno.(in Spanish) Edilesa, 2007. ISBN 978-84-8012618-2
- Bango Torviso, Isidro G. Tesoros de España. Vol. III. Románico.(in Spanish) Espasa-Calpe, 2000. ISBN 84-239-6674-7
- Bango Torviso, Isidro G. Historia del Arte de Castilla y León. Tomo II. Arte Románico.(in Spanish) Ámbito Ediciones, Valladolid 1994. ISBN 84-8183-002-X
- Chamorro Lamas, Manuel. Rutas románica en Galicia.(in Spanish) Ediciones Encuentro, Madrid 1996. ISBN 84-7490-411-0
- García Guinea, Miguel Ángel. Románico en Palencia.(in Spanish) Diputación de Palencia, 2002 (2nd revised edition). ISBN 84-8173-091-2.
- García Guinea, Miguel Ángel, Blanco Martín and Francisco Javier. Iniciación al Arte Románico. La arquitectura románica: técnicas y principios.(in Spanish) Fundación de Santa María la Real. Aguilar de Campoo, 2000. ISBN 84-89483-13-2
- García Guinea, Miguel Ángel. Románico en Cantabria.(in Spanish) Guías Estudio, Santander 1996. ISBN 84-87934-49-8
- Herrera Marcos, Jesús, Arquitectura y simbolismo del románico en Valladolid.(in Spanish) Edita Ars Magna, 1997. Diputación de Valladolid. ISBN 84-923230-0-0
- Lampérez y Romea, Vicente. Historia de la arquitectura cristiana española en la Edad Media.(in Spanish) Tomo I. Editorial Ámbito, 1999. ISBN 84-7846-906-0
- Lampérez y Romea, Vicente. Historia de la arquitectura cristiana.(in Spanish) Manuales Gallach. Editorial Espasa Calpe, Madrid 1935
- Nuño González, Jaime. Iniciación al Arte Románico: Aportación de la Historia, de la Arqueología y de las ciencias auxiliares al conocimiento del estilo románico.(in Spanish) Aguilar de Campoo, 2000. ISBN 84-89483-13-2
- Pijoán, José. Summa Artis. Historia general del arte. Vol. IX. El arte románico siglos XI y XII.(in Spanish) Espasa Calpe, Madrid 1949.
- Arce, Javier, and Dominic Currin. Art and Architecture of Spain. Edited by Xavier Barral i Altet. 1st North American ed. Boston: Little, Brown, 1998. ISBN 0-8212-2456-5
