= Alicia Gallego =

Spanish politician

Alicia Gallego González is a Spanish politician of the Leonese People's Union (UPL). She has been the mayor of Santa María del Páramo since 2015, and was elected to the Cortes of Castile and León in 2022. In 2022, she succeeded Luis Mariano Santos as leader of the UPL and led the party in the 2026 regional election, retaining its three seats.

== Biography ==
Born in Santa María del Páramo in the Province of León, Gallego was elected mayor of her hometown in 2015, leading a minority government. She increased the number of seats on the council for the Leonese People's Union (UPL) in 2019 and 2023, the latter being 8 out of 11 seats. She was the first elected woman mayor of the town; Elpidia Alonso Tagarro had served from 1975 to 1979 on appointment by the civil governor of León during the Spanish transition to democracy.

At the time of the 2022 Castilian-Leonese regional election, Gallego was the UPL mayor whose town had the most inhabitants. She was promoted from third to second on the party's electoral list in the León constituency after the withdrawal of Valentín Martínez, mayor of Villaturiel. In the election, the party grew from only having leader Luis Mariano Santos to having three members in the Cortes of Castile and León, thereby becoming the third force in the constituency after the Spanish Socialist Workers' Party (PSOE) and the People's Party (PP).

On 13 May 2025, it was announced that at the UPL's 13th Congress a month later, Gallego would succeed Santos as secretary-general, while he would become vice-secretary. She ran unopposed. Gallego said that she and her party seek a new autonomous community comprising the provinces of León, Salamanca and Zamora, and that they would look for dialogue with entities proposing a new province for the comarca of El Bierzo in León. She blamed the PP government in Castile and León and the PSOE national government for what she considered to be a disadvantageous status quo for the three provinces.

In the 2026 Castilian-Leonese regional election, the UPL fell short of its target to be the most voted party in the León constituency. It remained on three deputies, behind the PSOE and PP in the constituency, and not enough to form a parliamentary group. While it was the most voted in the city of León, it did not do well in the culturally distinct PSOE heartland of El Bierzo.
