= Pablo Santos =

Pablo Santos may refer to:

- Pablo Santos (actor) (1987–2006), Mexican actor
- Pablo Santos (tennis) (born 1984), Spanish tennis player
- Pablo Fernández Santos (born 1976), Spanish politician
- Pablo Santos (footballer) (born 1992), Brazilian footballer
- Pablo Santos (born 1994), Brazilian writer
