= Valladolid (Cortes of Castile and León constituency) =

Coordinates: 41°35′N 4°40′W

- Cortes of Castile and León; Electoral constituency
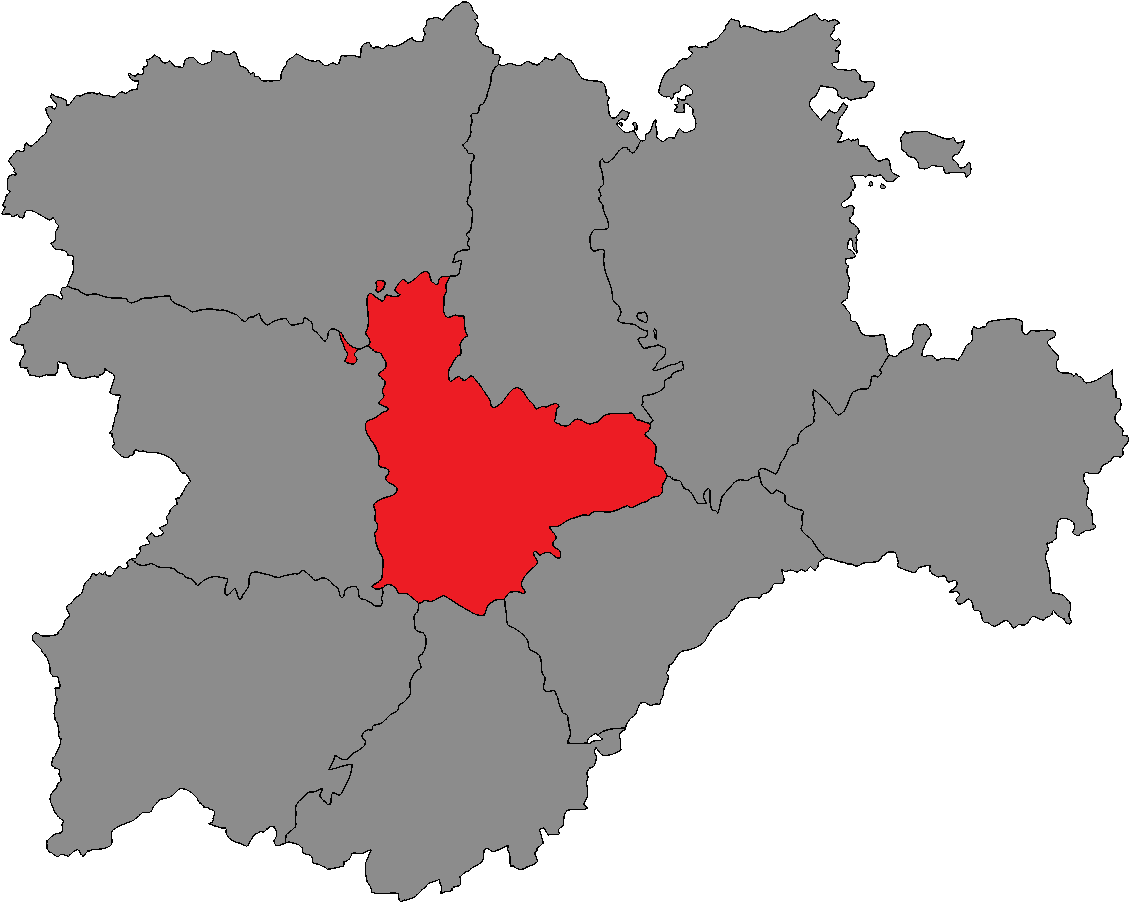
- Location of Valladolid within Castile and León
- Province: Valladolid
- Autonomous community: Castile and León
- Population: ▲528,841 (2025)
- Electorate: ▲437,764 (2026)
- Major settlements: Valladolid, Medina del Campo, Laguna de Duero

Current constituency
- Created: 1983
- Seats: 14 (1983–2007); 15 (2007–present)
- Members: PP (6); PSOE (6); Vox (3)

Valladolid is one of the nine constituencies (Spanish: circunscripciones) represented in the Cortes of Castile and León, the regional legislature of the Autonomous Community of Castile and León. The constituency currently elects 15 deputies. Its boundaries correspond to those of the Spanish province of Valladolid. The electoral system uses the D'Hondt method and closed-list proportional representation, with a minimum threshold of three percent.

== Electoral system ==
The constituency was created as per the Statute of Autonomy of Castile and León of 1983 and was first contested in the 1983 regional election. The Statute provided for the nine provinces in Castile and León—Ávila, Burgos, León, Palencia, Salamanca, Segovia, Soria, Valladolid and Zamora—to be established as multi-member districts in the Cortes of Castile and León, with this regulation being maintained under the 1987 regional electoral law. Each constituency is entitled to an initial minimum of three seats, with one additional member per each 45,000 inhabitants or fraction greater than 22,500.

Voting is on the basis of universal suffrage, which comprises all nationals over eighteen, registered in Castile and León and in full enjoyment of their political rights. Amendments to the electoral law in 2011 required for Castilian-Leonese people abroad to apply for voting before being permitted to vote, a system known as "begged" or expat vote (Spanish: Voto rogado) which was abolished in 2022. Seats are elected using the D'Hondt method and a closed list proportional representation, with an electoral threshold of three percent of valid votes—which includes blank ballots—being applied in each constituency. The use of the D'Hondt method might result in a higher effective threshold, depending on the district magnitude.

The electoral law allows for parties and federations registered in the interior ministry, coalitions and groupings of electors to present lists of candidates. Parties and federations intending to form a coalition ahead of an election are required to inform the relevant Electoral Commission within ten days of the election call—fifteen before 1985—whereas groupings of electors need to secure the signature of at least one percent of the electorate in the constituencies for which they seek election—one-thousandth of the electorate, with a compulsory minimum of 500 signatures, until 1985—disallowing electors from signing for more than one list of candidates.

== Procurators ==
Procurators 1983–present
Key to parties IUCyL UP Podemos PSOE CDS Cs PP CP AP Vox
Cortes	Election	Distribution
1st	1983	9 / 5
2nd	1987	6 / 3 / 5
3rd	1991	1 / 6 / 7
4th	1995	2 / 4 / 8
5th	1999	1 / 5 / 8
6th	2003	6 / 8
7th	2007	7 / 8
8th	2011	1 / 5 / 9
9th	2015	1 / 2 / 4 / 1 / 7
10th	2019	6 / 3 / 5 / 1
11th	2022	1 / 5 / 1 / 5 / 3
12th	2026	6 / 6 / 3

== Regional elections ==
=== 2026 ===
Summary of the 15 March 2026 Cortes of Castile and León election results in Valladolid
Parties and alliances	Popular vote			Seats	
Parties and alliances	Votes	%	±pp	Total	+/−
People's Party (PP)	104,536	36.18	+5.30	6	+1
Spanish Socialist Workers' Party (PSOE)	92,597	32.04	+0.77	6	+1
Vox (Vox)	59,750	20.68	+0.71	3	±0
United Left, Unite Movement, Greens Equo: In Common (IU–MS–VQ)^{1}	11,444	3.96	n/a	0	±0
The Party is Over (SALF)	4,466	1.55	New	0	±0
We Can–Green Alliance CyL 2026 (Podemos–AV)^{1}	2,350	0.81	n/a	0	−1
Citizens–Party of the Citizenry (Cs)	1,888	0.65	−6.26	0	−1
Animalist Party with the Environment (PACMA)^{2}	1,495	0.52	−0.06	0	±0
Blank Seats to Leave Empty Seats (EB)	1,396	0.48	New	0	±0
Municipalists–Empty Spain (MEV)	953	0.33	−1.27	0	±0
Castilian Party–Commoners' Land (PCAS–TC)	881	0.30	+0.08	0	±0
Nine Castile and León (NueveCyL)	574	0.20	New	0	±0
Spanish Phalanx of the CNSO (FE de las JONS)	539	0.19	+0.13	0	±0
For a Fairer World (M+J)	486	0.17	−0.04	0	±0
Communist Party of the Workers of Spain (PCTE)	467	0.16	+0.03	0	±0
Nationalist Party of Castile and León–Citizen Reformist Union (PANCAL–URCI)	229	0.08	New	0	±0
For Ávila (XAV)	146	0.05	−0.01	0	±0
Blank ballots	4,763	1.65	+0.62		
Total	288,960			15	±0
Valid votes	288,960	98.78	−0.19		
Invalid votes	3,571	1.22	+0.19		
Votes cast / turnout	292,531	66.82	+2.10		
Abstentions	145,230	33.18	−2.10		
Registered voters	437,761				
Sources
Footnotes: ^{1} Within the United We Can Castile and León alliance in the 2022 election.; ^{2} Animalist Party with the Environment results are compared to Animalist Party Against Mistreatment of Animals totals in the 2022 election.

=== 2022 ===
Summary of the 13 February 2022 Cortes of Castile and León election results in Valladolid
Parties and alliances	Popular vote			Seats	
Parties and alliances	Votes	%	±pp	Total	+/−
Spanish Socialist Workers' Party (PSOE)	86,328	31.27	–3.45	5	–1
People's Party (PP)	85,242	30.87	+1.32	5	±0
Vox (Vox)	55,125	19.97	+13.11	3	+2
United We Can Castile and León (Podemos–IU–AV)^{1}	19,165	6.94	–1.82	1	+1
Citizens–Party of the Citizenry (Cs)	19,081	6.91	–10.75	1	–2
Empty Spain (España Vaciada)	4,423	1.60	New	0	±0
Animalist Party Against Mistreatment of Animals (PACMA)	1,615	0.58	–0.02	0	±0
Castilian Party–Commoners' Land–Zero Cuts (PCAS–TC–RC)	611	0.22	New	0	±0
For a Fairer World (PUM+J)	572	0.21	New	0	±0
Regionalist Union of Castile and León (Unión Regionalista)	401	0.15	–0.05	0	±0
Communist Party of the Workers of Spain (PCTE)	354	0.13	+0.03	0	±0
Spanish Phalanx of the CNSO (FE de las JONS)	178	0.06	–0.02	0	±0
For Ávila (XAV)	172	0.06	New	0	±0
Blank ballots	2,835	1.03	+0.11		
Total	276,102			15	±0
Valid votes	276,102	98.97	–0.23		
Invalid votes	2,878	1.03	+0.23		
Votes cast / turnout	278,980	64.72	–4.20		
Abstentions	152,059	35.28	+4.20		
Registered voters	431,039				
Sources
Footnotes: ^{1} United We Can Castile and León results are compared to the combined totals of We Can–Equo and United Left–Anticapitalists in the 2019 election.

=== 2019 ===
Summary of the 26 May 2019 Cortes of Castile and León election results in Valladolid
Parties and alliances	Popular vote			Seats	
Parties and alliances	Votes	%	±pp	Total	+/−
Spanish Socialist Workers' Party (PSOE)	102,662	34.72	+9.73	6	+2
People's Party (PP)	87,357	29.55	–6.19	5	–2
Citizens–Party of the Citizenry (Cs)	52,225	17.66	+8.72	3	+2
Vox (Vox)	20,296	6.86	+5.78	1	+1
We Can–Equo (Podemos–Equo)	13,872	4.69	–8.38	0	–2
United Left–Anticapitalists (IU–Anticapitalistas–PCAS/TC–ALTER)^{1}	12,043	4.07	–2.37	0	–1
Animalist Party Against Mistreatment of Animals (PACMA)	1,787	0.60	–0.11	0	±0
Centrists–Independent Candidacy (CI–CCD)^{2}	860	0.29	–4.11	0	±0
Regionalist Union of Castile and León (Unión Regionalista)^{3}	605	0.20	+0.04	0	±0
Communist Party of the Workers of Spain (PCTE)	286	0.10	New	0	±0
Spanish Phalanx of the CNSO (FE de las JONS)	247	0.08	–0.15	0	±0
Communist Party of the Peoples of Spain (PCPE)	215	0.07	New	0	±0
Tradition and Future (TyF)	191	0.06	New	0	±0
With You, We Are Democracy (Contigo)	139	0.05	New	0	±0
Decide Now (Ahora Decide)^{4}	134	0.05	±0.00	0	±0
Blank ballots	2,727	0.92	–1.16		
Total	295,646			15	±0
Valid votes	295,646	99.20	+0.86		
Invalid votes	2,377	0.80	–0.86		
Votes cast / turnout	298,023	68.92	+1.16		
Abstentions	134,423	31.08	–1.16		
Registered voters	432,446				
Sources
Footnotes: ^{1} United Left–Anticapitalists results are compared to the combined totals of United Left–Equo: Convergence for Castile and León and Castilian Party–Commoners' Land: Pact in the 2015 election.; ^{2} Centrists–Independent Candidacy results are compared to Independent Candidacy–Citizens of Democratic Centre totals in the 2015 election.; ^{3} Regionalist Union of Castile and León results are compared to Regionalist Democracy of Castile and León totals in the 2015 election.; ^{4} Decide Now results are compared to Zamoran Independent Electors totals in the 2015 election.

=== 2015 ===
Summary of the 24 May 2015 Cortes of Castile and León election results in Valladolid
Parties and alliances	Popular vote			Seats	
Parties and alliances	Votes	%	±pp	Total	+/−
People's Party (PP)	103,538	35.74	–14.45	7	–2
Spanish Socialist Workers' Party (PSOE)	72,399	24.99	–4.15	4	–1
We Can (Podemos)	37,872	13.07	New	2	+2
Citizens–Party of the Citizenry (C's)	25,915	8.94	New	1	+1
United Left–Equo: Convergence for Castile and León (IU–Equo)	17,943	6.19	–1.63	1	±0
Independent Candidacy–Citizens of Democratic Centre (CI–CCD)^{1}	12,748	4.40	+1.54	0	±0
Union, Progress and Democracy (UPyD)	4,532	1.56	–2.73	0	±0
Vox (Vox)	3,116	1.08	New	0	±0
Animalist Party Against Mistreatment of Animals (PACMA)	2,060	0.71	+0.30	0	±0
United Free Citizens (CILUS)	742	0.26	New	0	±0
Castilian Party–Commoners' Land: Pact (PCAS–TC–Pacto)	715	0.25	–0.17	0	±0
Spanish Phalanx of the CNSO (FE de las JONS)	669	0.23	–0.01	0	±0
Regionalist Democracy of Castile and León (DRCyL)^{2}	475	0.16	–0.08	0	±0
National Democracy (DN)	446	0.15	–0.07	0	±0
Internationalist Solidarity and Self-Management (SAIn)	392	0.14	–0.02	0	±0
Zamoran Independent Electors (ADEIZA)	142	0.05	New	0	±0
Blank ballots	6,026	2.08	–0.89		
Total	289,730			15	±0
Valid votes	289,730	98.34	+0.05		
Invalid votes	4,896	1.66	–0.05		
Votes cast / turnout	294,626	67.76	–1.40		
Abstentions	140,187	32.24	+1.40		
Registered voters	434,813				
Sources
Footnotes: ^{1} Independent Candidacy–Citizens of Democratic Centre results are compared to The Party of Castile and León–Independent Candidacy totals in the 2011 election.; ^{2} Regionalist Democracy of Castile and León results are compared to Regionalist Unity of Castile and León totals in the 2011 election.

=== 2011 ===
Summary of the 22 May 2011 Cortes of Castile and León election results in Valladolid
Parties and alliances	Popular vote			Seats	
Parties and alliances	Votes	%	±pp	Total	+/−
People's Party (PP)	148,388	50.19	+1.42	9	+1
Spanish Socialist Workers' Party (PSOE)	86,143	29.14	–9.80	5	–2
United Left of Castile and León (IUCyL)	23,118	7.82	+3.08	1	+1
Union, Progress and Democracy (UPyD)	12,692	4.29	New	0	±0
The Party of Castile and León–Independent Candidacy (PCL–CI)	8,463	2.86	–0.06	0	±0
Citizens for Blank Votes (CenB)	1,630	0.55	New	0	±0
Party of Castile and León (PCAL)^{1}	1,252	0.42	–0.32	0	±0
Anti-Bullfighting Party Against Mistreatment of Animals (PACMA)	1,219	0.41	New	0	±0
Regionalist Unity of Castile and León (URCL)	724	0.24	–0.06	0	±0
Spanish Phalanx of the CNSO (FE de las JONS)	713	0.24	+0.05	0	±0
National Democracy (DN)	651	0.22	+0.14	0	±0
Communist Party of the Castilian People (PCPC)	588	0.20	+0.01	0	±0
Humanist Party (PH)	529	0.18	+0.07	0	±0
Internationalist Solidarity and Self-Management (SAIn)	469	0.16	New	0	±0
Communist Unification of Spain (UCE)	305	0.10	New	0	±0
Blank ballots	8,772	2.97	+1.05		
Total	295,656			15	±0
Valid votes	295,656	98.29	–1.05		
Invalid votes	5,156	1.71	+1.05		
Votes cast / turnout	300,812	69.16	–2.69		
Abstentions	134,136	30.84	+2.69		
Registered voters	434,948				
Sources
Footnotes: ^{1} Party of Castile and León results are compared to Commoners' Land–Alternative for Castile and León totals in the 2007 election.

=== 2007 ===
Summary of the 27 May 2007 Cortes of Castile and León election results in Valladolid
Parties and alliances	Popular vote			Seats	
Parties and alliances	Votes	%	±pp	Total	+/−
People's Party (PP)	150,690	48.77	+2.46	8	±0
Spanish Socialist Workers' Party (PSOE)	120,306	38.94	–0.98	7	+1
United Left–The Greens–Commitment for Castile and León (IU–LV–CyL)	14,640	4.74	+0.04	0	±0
Independent Candidacy–The Party of Castile and León (CI–PCL)	9,015	2.92	–0.64	0	±0
Commoners' Land–Alternative for Castile and León (TC–ACAL)	2,291	0.74	–0.24	0	±0
The Greens of Europe (LVE)	1,958	0.63	New	0	±0
Regionalist Unity of Castile and León (URCL)	914	0.30	–0.11	0	±0
Democratic and Social Centre (CDS)	713	0.23	–0.16	0	±0
Communist Party of the Castilian People (PCPC)	586	0.19	New	0	±0
Spanish Phalanx of the CNSO (FE de las JONS)^{1}	584	0.19	+0.01	0	±0
Republican Left (IR)	423	0.14	+0.02	0	±0
Liberal Democratic Centre (CDL)	330	0.11	New	0	±0
Humanist Party (PH)	328	0.11	–0.14	0	±0
National Democracy (DN)	254	0.08	New	0	±0
Blank ballots	5,936	1.92	–0.70		
Total	308,968			15	+1
Valid votes	308,968	99.34	+0.07		
Invalid votes	2,043	0.66	–0.07		
Votes cast / turnout	311,011	71.85	–1.64		
Abstentions	121,821	28.15	+1.64		
Registered voters	432,832				
Sources
Footnotes: ^{1} Spanish Phalanx of the CNSO results are compared to Independent Spanish Phalanx–Phalanx 2000 totals in the 2003 election.

=== 2003 ===
Summary of the 25 May 2003 Cortes of Castile and León election results in Valladolid
Parties and alliances	Popular vote			Seats	
Parties and alliances	Votes	%	±pp	Total	+/−
People's Party (PP)	145,460	46.31	–2.35	8	±0
Spanish Socialist Workers' Party (PSOE)	125,372	39.92	+3.82	6	+1
United Left of Castile and León (IUCyL)	14,777	4.70	–2.81	0	–1
Independent Candidacy–The Party of Castile and León (CI–PCL)	11,180	3.56	+1.18	0	±0
Commoners' Land–Castilian Nationalist Party (TC–PNC)	3,087	0.98	+0.21	0	±0
Castilian Left (IzCa)	1,744	0.56	New	0	±0
Regionalist Unity of Castile and León (URCL)	1,284	0.41	–0.45	0	±0
Democratic and Social Centre (CDS)	1,218	0.39	–0.17	0	±0
Humanist Party (PH)	798	0.25	–0.03	0	±0
Independent Spanish Phalanx–Phalanx 2000 (FEI–FE 2000)	556	0.18	New	0	±0
Republican Left (IR)	377	0.12	New	0	±0
Blank ballots	8,232	2.62	–0.25		
Total	314,085			14	±0
Valid votes	314,085	99.27	+0.06		
Invalid votes	2,305	0.73	–0.06		
Votes cast / turnout	316,390	73.49	+5.80		
Abstentions	114,140	26.51	–5.80		
Registered voters	430,530				

=== 1999 ===
Summary of the 13 June 1999 Cortes of Castile and León election results in Valladolid
Parties and alliances	Popular vote			Seats	
Parties and alliances	Votes	%	±pp	Total	+/−
People's Party (PP)	138,468	48.66	–2.47	8	±0
Spanish Socialist Workers' Party (PSOE)	102,737	36.10	+5.45	5	+1
United Left of Castile and León (IUCyL)	21,371	7.51	–6.06	1	–1
Independent Candidacy of Valladolid (CIV)	6,784	2.38	+1.67	0	±0
Regionalist Unity of Castile and León (URCL)	2,459	0.86	+0.19	0	±0
Commoners' Land–Castilian Nationalist Party (TC–PNC)	2,190	0.77	+0.29	0	±0
Centrist Union–Democratic and Social Centre (UC–CDS)	1,584	0.56	New	0	±0
Humanist Party (PH)	807	0.28	New	0	±0
Blank ballots	8,154	2.87	+1.07		
Total	284,554			14	±0
Valid votes	284,554	99.21	–0.01		
Invalid votes	2,263	0.79	+0.01		
Votes cast / turnout	286,817	67.69	–6.18		
Abstentions	136,881	32.31	+6.18		
Registered voters	423,698				

=== 1995 ===
Summary of the 28 May 1995 Cortes of Castile and León election results in Valladolid
Parties and alliances	Popular vote			Seats	
Parties and alliances	Votes	%	±pp	Total	+/−
People's Party (PP)	153,968	51.13	+8.56	8	+1
Spanish Socialist Workers' Party (PSOE)	92,308	30.65	–7.72	4	–2
United Left of Castile and León (IU)	40,867	13.57	+5.41	2	+1
Independent Candidacy of Valladolid (CIV)	2,148	0.71	New	0	±0
Regionalist Unity of Castile and León (URCL)^{1}	2,015	0.67	–0.72	0	±0
Platform of Independents of Spain (PIE)	1,671	0.55	New	0	±0
Commoners' Land–Castilian Nationalist Party (TC–PNC)	1,434	0.48	+0.31	0	±0
Communist Party of the Peoples of Spain (PCPE)	510	0.17	New	0	±0
Spanish Phalanx of the CNSO (FE–JONS)	479	0.16	–0.09	0	±0
Party of El Bierzo (PB)	308	0.10	New	0	±0
Blank ballots	5,432	1.80	+0.07		
Total	301,140			14	±0
Valid votes	301,140	99.22	+0.05		
Invalid votes	2,365	0.78	–0.05		
Votes cast / turnout	303,505	73.87	+8.67		
Abstentions	107,362	26.13	–8.67		
Registered voters	410,867				
Sources
Footnotes: ^{1} Regionalist Unity of Castile and León results are compared to Regionalist Democracy of Castile and León totals in the 1991 election.

=== 1991 ===
Summary of the 26 May 1991 Cortes of Castile and León election results in Valladolid
Parties and alliances	Popular vote			Seats	
Parties and alliances	Votes	%	±pp	Total	+/−
People's Party (PP)^{1}	106,948	42.57	+8.97	7	+2
Spanish Socialist Workers' Party (PSOE)	96,394	38.37	+1.96	6	±0
United Left (IU)	20,506	8.16	+3.72	1	+1
Democratic and Social Centre (CDS)	13,012	5.18	–15.16	0	–3
Regionalist Democracy of Castile and León (DRCL)	3,481	1.39	New	0	±0
The Greens (LV)	3,008	1.20	New	0	±0
The Greens Ecologist–Humanist List (LVLE–H)^{2}	1,622	0.65	+0.30	0	±0
Spanish Phalanx of the CNSO (FE–JONS)	630	0.25	–0.06	0	±0
Left Unitary Platform (PCE (m–l)–CRPE)	435	0.17	New	0	±0
Commoners' Land (TC)	429	0.17	New	0	±0
Castilianist Union (UC)	384	0.15	New	0	±0
Blank ballots	4,356	1.73	+0.21		
Total	251,205			14	±0
Valid votes	251,205	99.17	+0.50		
Invalid votes	2,109	0.83	–0.50		
Votes cast / turnout	253,314	65.20	–8.31		
Abstentions	135,200	34.80	+8.31		
Registered voters	388,514				
Sources
Footnotes: ^{1} People's Party results are compared to the combined totals of People's Alliance and People's Democratic Party in the 1987 election.; ^{2} The Greens Ecologist–Humanist List results are compared to Humanist Platform totals in the 1987 election.

=== 1987 ===
Summary of the 10 June 1987 Cortes of Castile and León election results in Valladolid
Parties and alliances	Popular vote			Seats	
Parties and alliances	Votes	%	±pp	Total	+/−
Spanish Socialist Workers' Party (PSOE)	97,169	36.41	–16.89	6	–3
People's Alliance (AP)^{1}	87,315	32.72	n/a	5	±0
Democratic and Social Centre (CDS)	54,276	20.34	+15.64	3	+3
United Left (IU)^{2}	11,853	4.44	–0.34	0	±0
Workers' Party of Spain–Communist Unity (PTE–UC)	5,834	2.19	New	0	±0
People's Democratic Party (PDP)^{1}	2,335	0.88	n/a	0	±0
Nationalist Party of Castile and León (PNCL–PANCAL)^{1}	1,511	0.57	n/a	0	±0
Humanist Platform (PH)	933	0.35	New	0	±0
Spanish Phalanx of the CNSO (FE–JONS)	823	0.31	New	0	±0
Spanish Ruralist Party (PRE)	749	0.28	New	0	±0
Blank ballots	4,044	1.52	+0.81		
Total	266,842			14	±0
Valid votes	266,842	98.67	+0.27		
Invalid votes	3,587	1.33	–0.27		
Votes cast / turnout	270,429	73.51	+2.91		
Abstentions	97,438	26.49	–2.91		
Registered voters	367,867				
Sources
Footnotes: ^{1} Within the People's Coalition alliance in the 1983 election.; ^{2} United Left results are compared to Communist Party of Spain totals in the 1983 election.

=== 1983 ===
Summary of the 8 May 1983 Cortes of Castile and León election results in Valladolid
Parties and alliances	Popular vote			Seats	
Parties and alliances	Votes	%	±pp	Total	+/−
Spanish Socialist Workers' Party (PSOE)	133,801	53.30	n/a	9	n/a
People's Coalition (AP–PDP–UL)	86,633	34.51	n/a	5	n/a
Communist Party of Castile and León (PCCL–PCE)	11,986	4.78	n/a	0	n/a
Democratic and Social Centre (CDS)	11,800	4.70	n/a	0	n/a
Agrarian Bloc–Regionalist Party of the Leonese Country (BAR–PREPAL)	5,006	1.99	n/a	0	n/a
Blank ballots	1,789	0.71	n/a		
Total	251,015			14	n/a
Valid votes	251,015	98.40	n/a		
Invalid votes	4,087	1.60	n/a		
Votes cast / turnout	255,102	70.60	n/a		
Abstentions	106,210	29.40	n/a		
Registered voters	361,312				
