= 2022 Castilian-Leonese regional election =

Election in the Spanish region of Castile and León

- 13 February 2022

All 81 seats in the Cortes of Castile and León 41 seats needed for a majority
- Opinion polls
- Registered: 2,094,623 ▼1.0%
- Turnout: 1,230,599 (58.8%) ▼7.0 pp
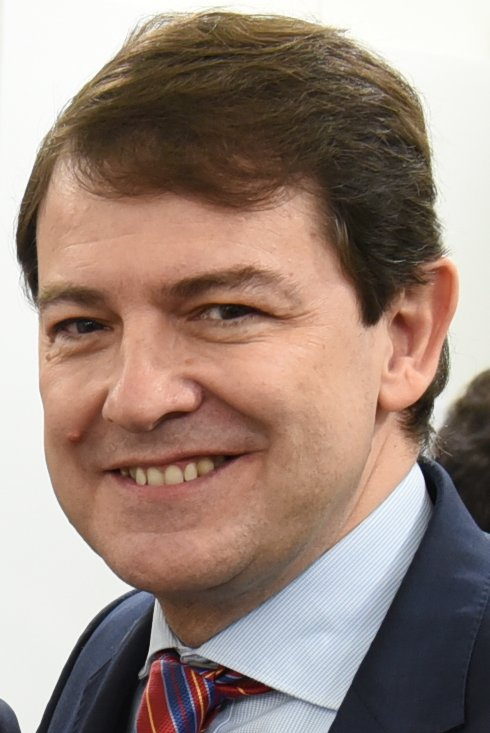

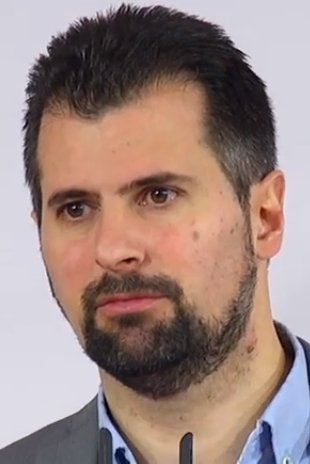

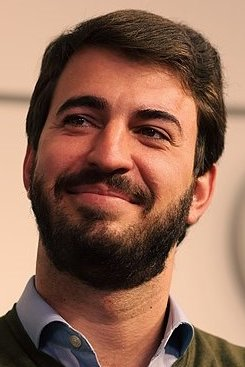

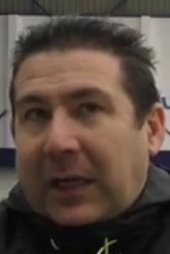

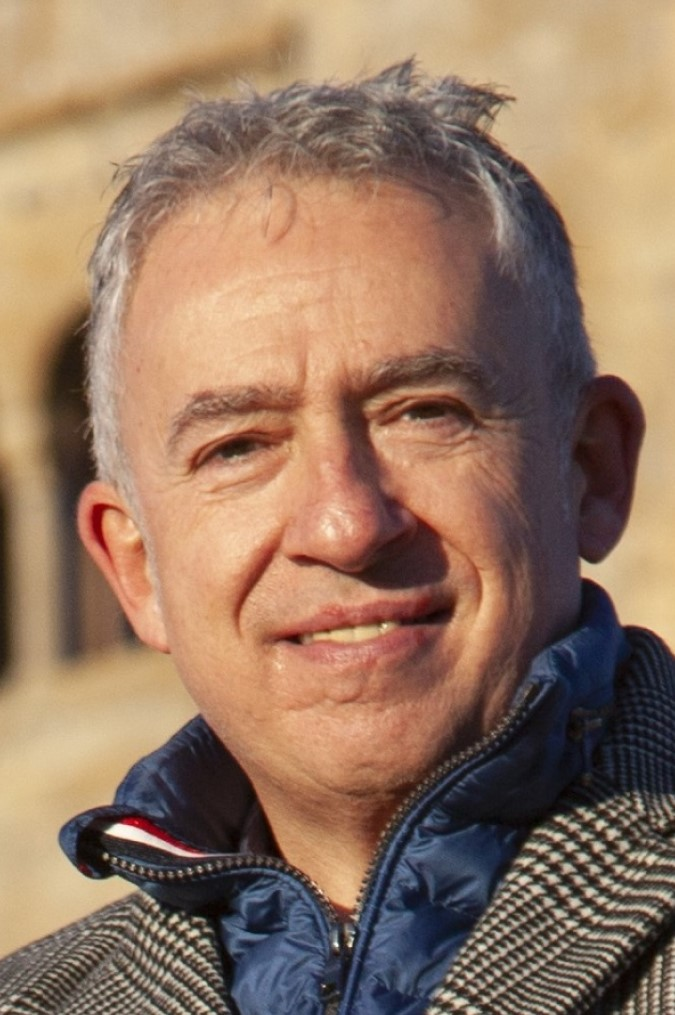

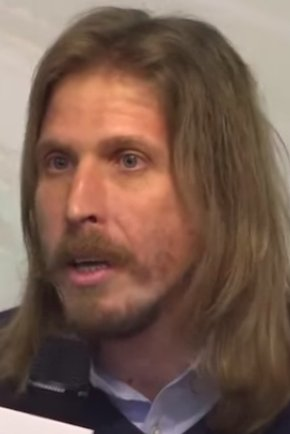

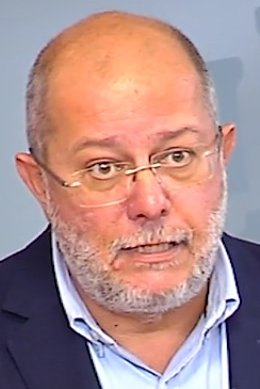

	First party	Second party	Third party
Leader	Alfonso Fernández Mañueco	Luis Tudanca	Juan García-Gallardo
Party	PP	PSOE	Vox
Leader since	1 April 2017	18 October 2014	7 January 2022
Leader's seat	Salamanca	Burgos	Valladolid
Last election	29 seats, 31.5%	35 seats, 34.8%	1 seat, 5.5%
Seats won	31	28	13
Seat change	▲2	▼7	▲12
Popular vote	382,157	365,434	214,668
Percentage	31.4%	30.0%	17.6%
Swing	▼0.1 pp	▼4.9 pp	▲12.1 pp
	Fourth party	Fifth party	Sixth party
Leader	Luis Mariano Santos	Ángel Ceña	Pablo Fernández
Party	UPL	EV–SY	Podemos–IU–AV
Leader since	27 March 2015	10 January 2022	14 February 2015
Leader's seat	León	Soria	Valladolid
Last election	1 seat, 2.0%	Did not contest	2 seats, 7.3% (Note: Results for Podemos–Equo (5.0%, 2 seats) and IU–Anticapitalistas–PCAS/TC–ALTER (2.3%, 0 seats) in the 2019 election.)
Seats won	3	3	1
Seat change	▲2	▲3	▼1
Popular vote	52,098	39,040	62,138
Percentage	4.3%	3.2%	5.1%
Swing	▲2.3 pp	New party	▼2.2 pp
	Seventh party	Eighth party
Leader	Francisco Igea	Pedro Pascual
Party	Cs	XAV
Leader since	11 March 2019	9 April 2019
Leader's seat	Valladolid	Ávila
Last election	12 seats, 14.9%	1 seat, 0.7%
Seats won	1	1
Seat change	▼11	0
Popular vote	54,721	13,875
Percentage	4.5%	1.1%
Swing	▼10.4 pp	▲0.4 pp
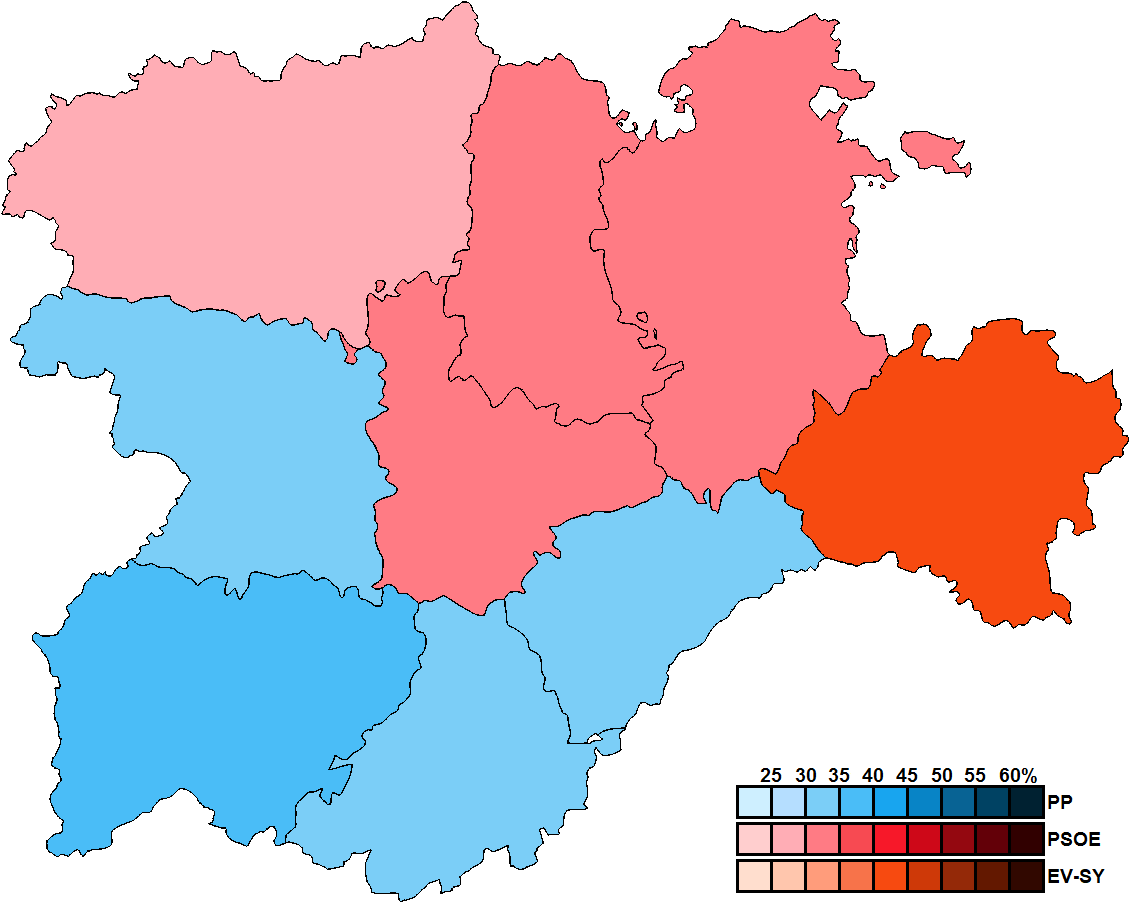
President before election
Alfonso Fernández Mañueco
PP
President after election
Alfonso Fernández Mañueco
PP

A regional election was held in Castile and León on 13 February 2022 to elect the 11th Cortes of the autonomous community. All 81 seats in the Cortes were up for election. This marked the first time that a Castilian-Leonese president exercised the legal prerogative to call a snap election.

The previous election had seen a victory for the opposition Spanish Socialist Workers' Party (PSOE) for the first time since 1983, but the ruling People's Party (PP) was able to elect its candidate, Alfonso Fernández Mañueco, as new regional president by forming a coalition with the liberal Citizens (Cs). Despite this arrangement, tensions soon began to emerge between the two governing partners over the management of the COVID-19 pandemic in the region. In March 2021, a PSOE-tabled vote of no confidence was defeated, but it indirectly led to the defection of one Cs legislator to the opposition, leaving the PP–Cs government in minority status. Subsequently, rumours rose on the possibility of Mañueco planning an early election to be held at some point between the winter of 2021 and the spring of 2022, after having grown tired of the coalition as well as to take advantage of the PP's "honeymoon" in opinion polls following the Madrilenian election in May. On 20 December 2021, Mañueco expelled Cs from his government and called the election for 13 February 2022, catching his coalition partner off-guard, with his (now former) deputy Francisco Igea learning of it during a live interview.

Results on election night were dubbed by most media as a pyrrhic victory for the PP, which failed to materialize early expectations of a landslide win in a historical stronghold, and instead ended up obtaining its worst result ever in both votes and vote share in the region, as well as a very close result with the PSOE, which was able to secure a stronger-than-expected performance, despite losing ground compared to 2019. The vote share for Cs collapsed and the party was barely able to retain Igea's seat in Valladolid but was successful in its primary goal of preventing a total wipeout. The far-right Vox party secured its best result in an autonomous community election in Spain up until that point, with 17.6% of the vote share and 13 seats. Unidas Podemos underperformed opinion polls, whereas regionalist Leonese People's Union (UPL) and For Ávila (XAV) secured their best results to date. Soria Now (SY)—a social platform aligned to the Empty Spain movement—won in the Soria constituency in a landslide. Together, both PP and Vox commanded a majority of 44 out of 81 seats, and formed a coalition government.

== Overview ==
Under the 2007 Statute of Autonomy, the Cortes of Castile and León was the unicameral legislature of the homonymous autonomous community, having legislative power in devolved matters, as well as the ability to grant or withdraw confidence from a regional president. The electoral and procedural rules were supplemented by national law provisions.

=== Date ===
The term of the Cortes of Castile and León expired four years after the date of its previous election, unless it was dissolved earlier. The election decree was required to be issued no later than 25 days before the scheduled expiration date of parliament and published on the following day in the Official Gazette of Castile and León (BOCYL), with election day taking place 54 days after the decree's publication. The previous election was held on 26 May 2019, which meant that the chamber's term would have expired on 26 May 2023. The election decree was required to be published in the BOCYL no later than 2 May 2023, setting the latest possible date for election day on 25 June 2023.

The regional president had the prerogative to dissolve the Cortes of Castile and León at any given time and call a snap election, provided that no motion of no confidence was in process and that dissolution did not occur either during the first legislative session or before one year after a previous one. In the event of an investiture process failing to elect a regional president within a two-month period from the first ballot, the Cortes were to be automatically dissolved and a fresh election called.

By 2021, the relationship between the two ruling coalition partners, the People's Party (PP) and Citizens (Cs) had become strained to the point that President Alfonso Fernández Mañueco was considering to call a snap election for late in the year or early 2022, taking advantage of the momentum gained by the PP in opinion polls as a result of its victory in the 2021 Madrilenian regional election. Mañueco was also wary that the Cs internal crisis, which had seen a number of defections from the party, could see a successful motion of no confidence being mounted on him once the PSOE was able to table a new censure motion in March 2022, one year after a previous, unsuccessful one. In October 2021, it was hinted that Mañueco was considering an election to be held on either 28 November or 12 December, though it later transpired that an election in the spring of 2022 was more likely. Speculation on an early election in Andalusia, coupled with possible snap elections in other regions—such as Aragon or the Valencian Community—initially hinted at a possible simultaneous electoral call, but Andalusian president Juan Manuel Moreno's announcement on 30 November that an election in Andalusia would not be held sooner than June 2022 meant that any prospective Castilian-Leonese snap election would be held earlier. This was finally confirmed on 20 December 2021 when Mañueco announced a snap election for 13 February 2022.

The Cortes of Castile and León was officially dissolved on 21 December 2021 with the publication of the corresponding decree in the BOCYL, setting election day for 13 February 2022 and scheduling for the chamber to reconvene on 10 March.

=== Electoral system ===
Voting for the Cortes was based on universal suffrage, comprising all Spanish nationals over 18 years of age, registered in Castile and León and with full political rights, provided that they had not been deprived of the right to vote by a final sentence. Additionally, non-resident citizens were required to apply for voting, a system known as "begged" voting (Spanish: Voto rogado).

The Cortes of Castile and León had three seats per each multi-member constituency—corresponding to the provinces of Ávila, Burgos, León, Palencia, Salamanca, Segovia, Soria, Valladolid and Zamora—plus one additional seat per 45,000 inhabitants or fraction above 22,500. All were elected using the D'Hondt method and closed-list proportional voting, with a three percent-threshold of valid votes (including blank ballots) in each constituency. The use of this electoral method resulted in a higher effective threshold depending on district magnitude and vote distribution.

As a result of the aforementioned allocation, each Cortes constituency was entitled the following seats:

Seats	Constituencies
15	Valladolid
13	León
11	Burgos
10	Salamanca
7	Ávila, Palencia, Zamora
6	Segovia
5	Soria

The law did not provide for by-elections to fill vacant seats; instead, any vacancies arising after the proclamation of candidates and during the legislative term were filled by the next candidates on the party lists or, when required, by designated substitutes.

=== Outgoing parliament ===
The table below shows the composition of the parliamentary groups in the chamber at the time of dissolution.

Parliamentary composition in December 2021
Groups	Parties	Legislators	
Groups	Parties	Seats	Total
Socialist Parliamentary Group	PSOE	35	35
People's Parliamentary Group	PP	29	29
Citizens's Parliamentary Group	Cs	11	11
Mixed Group	Podemos	2	5
Mixed Group	Vox	1	5
Mixed Group	UPL	1	5
Mixed Group	XAV	1	5
Non-Inscrits	INDEP	1 (Note: María Montero, former Cs legislator.)	1

== Parties and candidates ==
The electoral law allowed for parties and federations registered in the interior ministry, alliances and groupings of electors to present lists of candidates. Parties and federations intending to form an alliance were required to inform the relevant electoral commission within 10 days of the election call, whereas groupings of electors needed to secure the signature of at least one percent of the electorate in the constituencies for which they sought election, disallowing electors from signing for more than one list. Additionally, a balanced composition of men and women was required in the electoral lists, so that candidates of either sex made up at least 40 percent of the total composition.

Below is a list of the main parties and alliances which contested the election:

Candidacy	Parties and alliances	Leading candidate	Ideology	Previous result		Gov.	Ref.
Candidacy	Parties and alliances	Leading candidate	Ideology	Vote %	Seats	Gov.	Ref.
PSOE	List: Spanish Socialist Workers' Party (PSOE)	Luis Tudanca	Social democracy	34.8%	35	No	
PP	List: People's Party (PP)	Alfonso Fernández Mañueco	Conservatism; Christian democracy	31.5%	29	Yes	
Cs	List: Citizens–Party of the Citizenry (Cs)	Francisco Igea	Liberalism	14.9%	12	No	
Podemos– IU–AV	List: We Can (Podemos); United Left of Castile and León (IUCyL) – Communist Party of Castile and León (PCCyL) – The Dawn Marxist Organization (La Aurora (OM)) – Republican Left (IR); Green Alliance (AV)	Pablo Fernández	Left-wing populism Direct democracy Democratic socialism	7.3%	2	No	
Vox	List: Vox (Vox)	Juan García-Gallardo	Right-wing populism Ultranationalism; National conservatism	5.5%	1	No	
UPL	List: Leonese People's Union (UPL)	Luis Mariano Santos	Leonesism; Regionalism; Autonomism	2.0%	1	No	
XAV	List: For Ávila (XAV)	Pedro Pascual	Regionalism	0.7%	1	No	
EV–SY	List: Soria Now! (SY); Burgos Roots (Burgos Enraíza); Clean Plateau (Meseta Limpia); Aprodespa (Aprodespa)	Ángel Ceña	Localism; Ruralism	Did not contest		No	

In September 2021, citizen collectives of the so-called "Empty Spain" (Spanish: España Vacía or España Vaciada), a coined term to refer to Spain's rural and largely unpopulated interior provinces, agreed to look for formulas to contest the next elections in Spain, inspired by the success of the Teruel Existe candidacy (Spanish for "Teruel Exists") in the November 2019 general election. By November 2021, it was confirmed that over 160 collectives and associations from about 30 Spanish provinces had committed themselves to finalizing the electoral platform before January 2022, and that it would be ready to contest any snap election in Castile and León. This was confirmed following Mañueco's announcement of the election date for 13 February 2022, with the Soria Now! (Spanish: Soria ¡Ya!), Burgos Roots (Spanish: Burgos Enraíza) platforms confirming their participation. On 27 December, Clean Plateau (Spanish: Meseta Limpia) and Aprodespa announced a candidacy of the Empty Spain in the province of Palencia, with a candidacy for Salamanca being announced the next day, and for Valladolid on 10 January. However, the platform ruled out standing in Ávila, León, Segovia and Zamora.

== Campaign ==
=== Timetable ===
The key dates are listed below (all times are CET):

- 20 December: The election decree is issued with the countersign of the president, after deliberation in the Regional Government.
- 21 December: Formal dissolution of parliament and start of prohibition period on the inauguration of public works, services or projects.
- 24 December: Initial constitution of provincial and zone electoral commissions with judicial members.
- 27 December: Division of constituencies into polling sections and stations.
- 31 December: Deadline for parties and federations to report on their electoral alliances.
- 3 January: Deadline for electoral register consultation for the purpose of possible corrections.
- 10 January: Deadline for parties, federations, alliances, and groupings of electors to present electoral lists.
- 12 January: Publication of submitted electoral lists in the Official Gazette of Castile and León (BOCyL); deadline for parties, federations, alliances, and groupings of electors to communicate their presidential candidates for the purpose of electoral debates.
- 15 January: Deadline for non-resident citizens (electors residing abroad (CERA) and citizens temporarily absent from Spain) to apply for voting.
- 17 January: Official proclamation of validly submitted electoral lists.
- 18 January: Publication of proclaimed electoral lists in the BOCyL.
- 19 January: Deadline for the selection of polling station members by sortition.
- 27 January: Deadline for the appointment of non-judicial members to provincial and zone electoral commissions.
- 28 January: Official start of electoral campaigning.
- 3 February: Deadline to apply for postal voting.
- 8 February: Start of legal ban on electoral opinion polling publication; deadline for CERA citizens to vote by mail.
- 9 February: Deadline for postal and temporarily absent voting (extended to 11 February by the Central Electoral Commission).
- 11 February: Last day of electoral campaigning; deadline for CERA voting.
- 12 February: Official election silence ("reflection day").
- 13 February: Election day (polling stations open at 9 am and close at 8 pm or once voters present in a queue at/outside the polling station at 8 pm have cast their vote); provisional vote counting.
- 16 February: Start of general vote counting, including CERA votes.
- 19 February: Deadline for the general vote counting.
- 28 February: Deadline for the proclamation of elected members.
- 15 March: Deadline for the reconvening of parliament (date determined by the election decree, which for the 2022 election was set for 10 March).
- 9 April: Deadline for the publication of definitive election results in the BOCyL.

=== Party slogans ===
Party or alliance	Original slogan	English translation	Ref.
PSOE	« Cambio y esperanza »	"Change and hope"	
PP	« La fuerza que nos mueve »	"The force that makes us move"	
Cs	« El valor de la palabra »	"The value of the word"	
Podemos–IU–AV	« Que tu voz se escuche »	"Let your voice be heard"	
Vox	« Siembra »	"Seedtime"	
UPL	« ¡Lo vamos a conseguir! »	"We are going to make it!"	
XAV	« Lo primero, nuestra provincia »	"First of all, our province"	
EV	« ¡Es el momento! »	"It is time!"	

=== Debates ===
The electoral law of Castile and León provided for the presidential candidates of the parties having a parliamentary group in the Cortes to participate in, at least, two leaders' debates to be held during the electoral campaign. Only the PSOE, PP and Cs had parliamentary groups going into the 2022 election, meaning that parties such as Podemos and Vox were excluded from participating.

2022 Castilian-Leonese regional election debates
Date	Organizer(s)	Moderator(s)	P Present (Note: Denotes a main invitee attending the event.) S Surrogate (Note: Denotes a main invitee not attending the event, sending a surrogate in their place.) NI Not invited I Invited A Absent invitee				
Date	Organizer(s)	Moderator(s)	PSOE	PP	Cs	Audience	Ref.
31 January	RTVE	Xabier Fortes	P Tudanca	P Mañueco	P Igea	22.1% (193,000) (Note: In Castile and León, the debate was broadcast on La 1 (125,000; 14.3%), 24 Horas (32,000; 3.7%), La 7 (25,000; 2.8%) and La 8 (11,000; 1.3%). Nationwide, the debate was broadcast on 24 Horas (129,000; 0.9%).)	
9 February	CyLTV	Alejandra Abad; Antonio Renedo	P Tudanca	P Mañueco	P Igea	7.9% (68,000)	

Both debates were assigned to the regional broadcasting company (Radio Televisión de Castilla y León, RTVCyL) to be held on 31 January and 9 February. However, the national public broadcaster, RTVE, demanded to hold at least one of them. The regional electoral board conceded the first debate to RTVE. On 29 January, Cs's candidate Francisco Igea had a positive test for COVID-19, and requested a postponement of the debate. The electoral board decided that Igea would virtually attend the debate on 31 January while isolated.

== Opinion polls ==
The tables below list opinion polling results in reverse chronological order, showing the most recent first and using the dates when the survey fieldwork was done, as opposed to the date of publication. Where the fieldwork dates are unknown, the date of publication is given instead. The highest percentage figure in each polling survey is displayed with its background shaded in the leading party's colour. If a tie ensues, this is applied to the figures with the highest percentages. The "Lead" column on the right shows the percentage-point difference between the parties with the highest percentages in a poll.

=== Graphical summary ===
Local regression trend line of poll results from 26 May 2019 to 13 February 2022, with each line corresponding to a political party.

=== Voting intention estimates ===
The table below lists weighted voting intention estimates. Refusals are generally excluded from the party vote percentages, while question wording and the treatment of "don't know" responses and those not intending to vote may vary between polling organisations. When available, seat projections determined by the polling organisations are displayed below (or in place of) the percentages in a smaller font; 41 seats were required for an absolute majority in the Cortes of Castile and León.

Color key:

Poll conducted after legal ban on opinion polls

Polling firm/Commissioner	Fieldwork date	Sample size	Turnout	PSOE	PP	Cs	Vox	Podemos	IUCyL	UPL	XAV	ZD	Unidas Podemos	EV	Lead
2022 regional election	13 Feb 2022	—N/a	58.8	30.0; 28	31.4; 31	4.5; 1	17.6; 13	(Note: Within Unidas Podemos.)		4.3; 3	1.1; 1	0.2; 0	5.1; 1	3.2; 3	1.4
SocioMétrica/El Español	12–13 Feb 2022	1,500	?	28.3; 26/28	33.0; 30/33	5.4; 0/1	15.1; 11/13			3.3; 2/3	0.9; 1	0.7; 0/1	7.5; 3	4.5; 3	4.7
Sigma Dos/El Mundo	31 Jan–12 Feb 2022	3,600	?	31.2; 28/30	32.4; 30/32	4.9; 1	14.7; 10/12			4.4; 3	0.8; 1	–	7.1; 2/3	3.4; 3	1.2
GAD3/ABC	31 Jan–12 Feb 2022	5,500	?	30.3; 26/28	33.2; 31/33	3.8; 1	15.6; 11/13			4.3; 3	0.9; 1	–	6.3; 1/3	1.8; 3	2.9
EM-Analytics/Electomanía	11 Feb 2022	531	60	27.9; 28	29.5; 29	5.1; 1	17.7; 13			4.1; 3	0.9; 1	0.4; 0	8.4; 3	5.4; 3	1.6
PSOE	11 Feb 2022	?	60–63	29.0– 30.0	29.0– 30.0	–	–			–	–	–	–	–	Tie
NC Report/La Razón	9–11 Feb 2022	1,000	62.2	28.6; 27/28	33.2; 33/35	4.1; 0/1	15.0; 11/12			3.9; 2/3	1.4; 1	0.8; 0/1	6.0; 2/3	4.5; 1/4	4.6
Metroscopia	8–11 Feb 2022	3,300	61	29.1; 27/29	30.7; 29/31	4.0; 0/1	18.7; 13/16			4.6; 3	0.9; 0/1	–	6.7; 2/3	3.3; 2/3	1.6
EM-Analytics/Electomanía	10 Feb 2022	279	60	27.9; 28	29.2; 29	5.4; 1	17.4; 13			4.1; 3	0.9; 1	0.4; 0	8.5; 3	5.4; 3	1.3
PP	10 Feb 2022	?	?	–	? 28/31	–	? 12/15			–	–	–	–	–	?
EM-Analytics/Electomanía	9 Feb 2022	322	60	27.5; 27	29.5; 29	5.4; 1	17.3; 13			4.2; 3	0.8; 1	0.4; 0	8.5; 3	5.6; 4	2.0
EM-Analytics/Electomanía	8 Feb 2022	218	60	27.4; 27	30.0; 29	5.3; 1	17.2; 13			4.1; 3	0.7; 1	0.4; 0	8.5; 3	5.6; 4	2.6
EM-Analytics/Electomanía	7 Feb 2022	274	?	26.6; 27	30.9; 30	5.3; 1	17.1; 13			4.0; 3	0.7; 1	0.4; 0	8.3; 3	5.2; 3	4.3
KeyData/Público	7 Feb 2022	?	64.4	28.6; 27	33.8; 32	4.6; 1	14.5; 11			3.3; 2	0.8; 1	–	7.2; 3	2.0; 4	5.2
Data10/Okdiario	5–7 Feb 2022	1,000	?	28.8; 27	35.2; 33	4.1; 0	14.7; 11			3.4; 3	0.8; 1	–	6.9; 3	5.1; 3	6.4
EM-Analytics/Electomanía	3–6 Feb 2022	466	?	26.2; 26	31.3; 31	5.1; 1	16.9; 13			4.0; 3	0.7; 1	0.3; 0	8.4; 3	5.4; 3	5.1
Oficina Demoscopia/Tribuna Grupo	23 Jan–6 Feb 2022	4,502	?	32.6; 30	33.0; 35	8.6; 4/5	12.7; 9			1.4; 1	–	–	6.7; 1/2	–	0.4
SocioMétrica/El Español	4–5 Feb 2022	1,200	?	28.1; 26/27	33.2; 32	5.2; 1	14.3; 11			3.4; 2/3	0.8; 1	0.8; 1	7.4; 3	4.8; 3	5.1
NC Report/La Razón	31 Jan–4 Feb 2022	1,000	?	28.0; 26/28	34.7; 34/37	4.3; 1	14.7; 10/11			3.6; 2/3	0.9; 1	–	6.5; 2/3	4.2; 1/4	6.7
GAD3/El Norte de Castilla	31 Jan–4 Feb 2022	1,000	66	28.9; 25/28	36.1; 34/37	4.3; 0/1	15.1; 11/13			3.3; 2	–	–	7.4; 2/3	1.8; 2	7.2
Target Point/El Debate	29 Jan–3 Feb 2022	1,020	62	29.3; 28/29	33.8; 33/34	4.1; 0/1	13.1; 10/11			3.1; 2/3	0.8; 0/1	–	7.4; 2/3	6.0; 3	4.5
Hamalgama Métrica/Vozpópuli	28 Jan–3 Feb 2022	1,000	?	27.9; 27	33.5; 31	4.6; 1	15.9; 12			3.4; 3	0.8; 1	–	7.7; 3	2.4; 3	5.6
Sigma Dos/El Mundo	25 Jan–3 Feb 2022	2,400	?	29.4; 26/30	36.5; 34/37	4.1; 1	12.8; 9/11			3.8; 2/3	1.3; 1	–	6.5; 2/3	3.5; 2/3	7.1
Ágora Integral/Canarias Ahora	31 Jan–2 Feb 2022	1,800	70.2	27.2; 27/28	32.7; 31/32	4.9; 1	15.2; 10/11			3.2; 2/3	1.3; 1	0.8; 0/1	7.8; 3	5.3; 3/4	5.5
CIS	27 Jan–2 Feb 2022	3,918	?	30.1; 29/34	29.7; 24/30	7.6; 2/5	11.0; 8/9			4.6; 2/3	1.2; 1/2	0.2; 0	7.2; 2/4	3.9; 2/3	0.4
40dB/Prisa	26 Jan–2 Feb 2022	1,123	?	29.7; 27/29	30.8; 30/32	4.0; 0/1	13.4; 10/11			3.9; 3	0.6; 0/1	0.6; 0	7.1; 3	6.4; 4/5	1.1
Data10/Okdiario	1 Feb 2022	?	?	28.7; 26	38.4; 36	4.4; 1	12.7; 10			3.1; 2	0.8; 1	–	6.2; 3	1.2; 2	9.7
EM-Analytics/Electomanía	30 Jan–1 Feb 2022	330	?	26.4; 27	31.0; 30	4.8; 1	16.8; 12			3.9; 3	0.7; 1	0.3; 0	8.6; 3	5.6; 4	4.6
GESOP/La Opinión de Zamora	30–31 Jan 2022	801	?	31.0; 27/31	34.7; 32/35	6.9; 2/3	10.3; 7/10			3.1; 2	0.7; 1	–	6.8; 3	2.8; 2	3.7
Celeste-Tel/Onda Cero	25–31 Jan 2022	1,100	?	28.2; 26	33.3; 32	4.2; 1	15.1; 10			3.8; 3	1.4; 1	0.9; 1	6.6; 3	4.7; 4	5.1
EM-Analytics/Electomanía	28–30 Jan 2022	250	?	27.4; 27	31.0; 31	4.7; 1	16.8; 13			3.8; 2	0.6; 0	0.3; 0	8.2; 3	5.3; 4	3.6
Data10/Okdiario	26–28 Jan 2022	1,000	?	28.6; 26	38.7; 37	3.9; 0	13.1; 11			3.0; 2	0.7; 1	–	6.3; 3	1.0; 1	10.1
KeyData/Público	26 Jan 2022	?	65.0	29.5; 27	37.3; 36	4.5; 1	13.1; 10			3.0; 2	0.8; 1	–	7.1; 3	1.1; 1	7.8
Sigma Dos/Antena 3	25 Jan 2022	?	?	29.7; 25/27	39.2; 37/39	3.5; 1	12.3; 9/10			3.2; 2	0.8; 0/1	–	7.0; 3	3.3; 1/2	9.5
EM-Analytics/Electomanía	23–25 Jan 2022	310	?	27.8; 28	30.8; 31	5.1; 1	16.2; 12			3.7; 3	0.6; 0	0.3; 0	7.9; 3	4.9; 3	3.0
SocioMétrica/El Español	18–25 Jan 2022	1,200	?	27.8; 27/29	33.8; 32/35	5.0; 0/1	14.1; 9/11			3.0; 3	0.6; 0	–	7.5; 3	? 1/3	6.0
Celeste-Tel/Onda Cero	19–24 Jan 2022	1,100	65.2	28.0; 25	35.9; 34	4.5; 1	14.0; 10			3.0; 2	1.3; 1	0.8; 1	6.6; 3	4.7; 4	7.9
EM-Analytics/Electomanía	20–23 Jan 2022	?	?	27.9; 28	32.2; 31	4.9; 1	16.0; 12			3.6; 2	0.6; 0	0.3; 0	7.6; 3	5.2; 4	4.3
CIS	7–22 Jan 2022	7,131	?	30.8; 25/34	29.8; 27/32	7.9; 2/5	9.3; 4/8			4.0; 2/3	1.1; 1	0.5; 0	8.7; 3/5	2.8; 2/3	1.0
IMOP/El Confidencial	19–21 Jan 2022	1,250	59.8	29.9; 28/29	35.7; 33/36	4.6; 1/2	13.0; 9/11			3.1; 2	? 0	–	7.1; 3/4	1.1; 1/2	5.8
NC Report/La Razón	14–21 Jan 2022	1,000	?	28.3; 26/28	38.5; 36/38	3.1; 1	13.2; 9			3.2; 2	0.8; 1	–	6.3; 2	4.7; 2/4	10.2
Target Point/El Debate	14–19 Jan 2022	1,005	67	28.9; 27/28	35.0; 35/36	3.8; 0/1	12.2; 9/10			3.0; 2/3	0.8; 0/1	–	7.3; 3	5.5; 1/3	6.1
EM-Analytics/Electomanía	16–18 Jan 2022	247	?	28.4; 27	33.2; 32	4.5; 1	14.9; 11			3.4; 2	0.6; 0	0.4; 0	6.7; 3	6.4; 5	4.8
EM-Analytics/Electomanía	13–16 Jan 2022	?	?	28.8; 28	33.7; 32	4.5; 1	14.9; 11			3.4; 2	0.6; 0	0.4; 0	6.4; 2	6.2; 5	4.9
GAD3/El Norte de Castilla	10–14 Jan 2022	1,089	?	29.1; 27/28	40.8; 38/39	2.6; 0/1	13.1; 9			2.9; 2	0.5; 0	–	6.0; 2/3	0.8; 1	11.7
EM-Analytics/Electomanía	6–9 Jan 2022	305	?	29.6; 28	34.9; 33	4.6; 0	14.1; 11			3.2; 2	0.7; 0	0.3; 0	6.4; 2	4.7; 5	5.3
Hamalgama Métrica/Vozpópuli	3–7 Jan 2022	1,000	?	30.7; 28	39.3; 37	5.2; 1	11.1; 9			2.8; 2	0.9; 1	–	7.0; 2	0.7; 1	8.6
Data10/Okdiario	4–6 Jan 2022	1,000	?	28.9; 26	40.1; 40	4.9; 1	12.8; 11			2.5; 2	0.7; 0	–	5.5; 1	–	11.2
EM-Analytics/Electomanía	27 Dec–2 Jan 2022	405	?	32.2; 30	34.7; 33	4.3; 0	14.3; 11			2.6; 2	0.8; 1	0.2; 0	5.7; 1	4.3; 3	2.5
KeyData/Público	29 Dec 2021	?	67.0	30.0; 29	38.1; 36	4.9; 0	13.6; 10			2.6; 2	0.8; 1	–	5.5; 2	0.8; 1	8.1
EM-Analytics/Electomanía	24–26 Dec 2021	952	?	32.4; 30	35.0; 33	4.4; 0	14.3; 11			2.6; 2	0.9; 1	0.2; 0	5.8; 2	2.9; 2	2.6
GAD3/El Norte de Castilla	22–23 Dec 2021	1,000	?	29.8; 28/29	39.2; 37/39	4.5; 1	13.5; 9/10	4.9; 1	0.7; 0	2.9; 2	0.4; 0	–	–	0.7; 1	9.4
SocioMétrica/El Español	21–23 Dec 2021	1,200	?	29.2; 28	37.1; 36	5.1; 1	14.0; 11	5.2; 1	2.4; 0	2.9; 2	0.9; 1	0.2; 0	–	1.0; 1	7.9
Sigma Dos/El Mundo	14–23 Dec 2021	3,845	?	31.9; 27/31	40.3; 37/42	5.1; 1	10.4; 5/9			3.0; 2	0.7; 0/1	–	5.7; 1/3	–	8.4
GAD3/NIUS	20–22 Dec 2021	1,000	62	31.8; 30	39.2; 37/39	4.2; 0/1	12.1; 10	4.3; 0	0.8; 0	2.8; 1/2	0.4; 0	–	–	0.7; 1	7.4
Sigma Dos/RTVCyL	29 Nov–21 Dec 2021	4,000	?	32.3; 28/31	40.1; 38/42	5.0; 0/1	9.7; 5/7			3.0; 2	0.6; 0/1	–	6.2; 2/3	–	7.8
Data10/Okdiario	20 Dec 2021	810	?	28.7; 27	40.7; 39	5.6; 1	12.4; 10			2.1; 1	0.8; 1	–	5.9; 2	–	12.0
PP	20 Dec 2021	?	?	? 30/31	? 38/40	? 0/1	? 7/8			–	–	–	? 2	–	?
EM-Analytics/Electomanía	20 Dec 2021	254	?	31.3; 28	37.6; 35	4.7; 0	14.4; 11			2.6; 2	1.0; 1	–	6.2; 3	0.7; 1	6.3
EM-Analytics/Electomanía	15 Dec 2021	?	?	30.0; 26	40.1; 40	4.7; 0	13.6; 10			2.8; 2	0.6; 0	–	6.3; 3	–	10.1
NC Report/La Razón	2–12 Nov 2021	1,000	?	31.1; 30/31	40.9; 38/40	6.7; 1	8.6; 6/7			2.3; 1/2	0.9; 1	–	6.1; 2	–	9.8
Metroscopia/Ical	21–25 Oct 2021	1,000	67	30.0; 27/29	36.8; 34/37	5.3; 1	14.3; 10/11			2.7; 2	0.6; 0/1	–	6.2; 2/3	–	6.8
Sigma Dos/RTVCyL	11–15 Jun 2021	1,200	?	29.5; 28	43.8; 43	3.5; 0	10.0; 7			2.2; 1	0.5; 0	–	6.5; 2	–	14.3
GAD3/El Norte de Castilla	22–31 May 2021	1,000	?	28.8; 27/28	43.6; 43	5.6; 1	9.7; 7	4.6; 1	1.5; 0	2.3; 1/2	0.6; 0	–	–	–	14.8
SyM Consulting/Nueva Crónica	23–26 Mar 2021	5,588	68.8	35.7; 32/35	36.2; 31/37	5.4; 1/4	11.7; 7/11	2.9; 0	–	1.6; 1	0.8; 0/1	–	–	–	0.5
Sigma Dos/RTVCyL	2–9 Dec 2020	3,300	?	31.7; 28/32	37.1; 34/38	7.4; 3	12.1; 7/9			1.4; 1	0.3; 0	–	7.1; 2/4	–	5.4
ElectoPanel/Electomanía	15 Sep 2020	?	?	36.2; 37	38.2; 38	7.9; 4	6.0; 1	4.7; 0	0.8; 0	2.3; 1	0.7; 0	–	–	–	2.0
Sigma Dos/RTVCyL (Note: "El PP volvería a ganar las elecciones y dependería de Vox para formar gobierno en Castilla y León". RTVCyL (in Spanish). 27 May 2020.)	14–19 May 2020	1,200	?	33.4	36.6	7.2	10.5			–	–	–	6.9	–	3.2
ElectoPanel/Electomanía	1 Apr–15 May 2020	?	?	34.5; 36	38.8; 40	7.5; 2	7.1; 2	4.4; 0	1.5; 0	2.1; 1	0.5; 0	–	–	–	4.3
November 2019 general election	10 Nov 2019	—N/a	66.6	31.3 (29)	31.6 (31)	7.6 (4)	16.6 (14)			0.7 (0)	0.4 (0)	–	9.3 (3)	–	0.3
2019 regional election	26 May 2019	—N/a	65.8	34.8; 35	31.5; 29	14.9; 12	5.5; 1	5.0; 2	2.3; 0	2.0; 1	0.7; 1	0.1; 0	–	–	3.3

=== Voting preferences ===
The table below lists raw, unweighted voting preferences.

Polling firm/Commissioner	Fieldwork date	Sample size	PSOE	PP	Cs	Vox	Podemos	IUCyL	UPL	XAV	Unidas Podemos	EV	Question	X mark	Lead
2022 regional election (Note: Does not include non-resident citizens.)	13 Feb 2022	—N/a	18.9	19.7	2.8	11.1			2.7	0.7	3.2	2.0	—N/a	36.6	0.8
SocioMétrica/El Español	4–5 Feb 2022	1,200	17.5	18.2	3.9	8.3			2.5	0.5	5.0	3.6	21.0	8.8	0.7
CIS	27 Jan–2 Feb 2022	3,918	19.8	19.0	3.2	6.5			3.2	0.7	6.0	2.0	28.4	6.6	0.8
40dB/Prisa	26 Jan–2 Feb 2022	1,123	16.6	15.3	3.4	9.5			2.9	0.4	5.2	5.0	29.1	6.7	1.3
SocioMétrica/El Español	18–25 Jan 2022	1,200	14.8	16.2	3.7	10.8			2.1	0.1	5.8	4.6	21.7	14.9	1.4
CIS	7–22 Jan 2022	7,131	19.2	18.9	3.4	6.0			2.5	0.7	5.2	1.7	33.8	4.7	0.3
SocioMétrica/El Español	21–23 Dec 2021	1,200	19.2	21.3	3.5	11.2	3.2	2.7	2.9	1.1	–	–	33.2		2.1
November 2019 general election	10 Nov 2019	—N/a	22.0	22.3	5.3	11.7			0.5	0.3	6.5	–	—N/a	28.6	0.3
2019 regional election	26 May 2019	—N/a	24.4	22.1	10.5	3.8	3.5	1.6	1.4	0.5	–	–	—N/a	29.2	2.3

=== Victory preferences ===
The table below lists opinion polling on the victory preferences for each party in the event of a regional election taking place.

Polling firm/Commissioner	Fieldwork date	Sample size	PSOE	PP	Cs	Vox	Podemos	IUCyL	UPL	XAV	Unidas Podemos	EV	Other/ None	Question	Lead
CIS	27 Jan–2 Feb 2022	3,918	27.9	23.1	4.8	6.9			2.1	0.5	5.2	0.5	10.4	18.6	4.8
CIS	7–22 Jan 2022	7,131	26.5	24.3	5.3	6.0			2.3	0.6	5.7	0.8	9.8	18.7	2.2

=== Victory likelihood ===
The table below lists opinion polling on the perceived likelihood of victory for each party in the event of a regional election taking place.

Polling firm/Commissioner	Fieldwork date	Sample size	PSOE	PP	Cs	Vox	Other/ None	Question	Lead
CIS	27 Jan–2 Feb 2022	3,918	15.2	61.8	0.5	1.1	1.3	20.1	46.6
CIS	7–22 Jan 2022	7,131	9.3	70.0	–	0.8	1.5	18.4	60.7

=== Preferred President ===
The table below lists opinion polling on leader preferences to become president of the Regional Government of Castile and León.

Polling firm/Commissioner	Fieldwork date	Sample size							Other/ None/ Not care	Question	Lead
Polling firm/Commissioner	Fieldwork date	Sample size	Tudanca PSOE	Mañueco PP	Igea Cs	Fernández UP	Pinacho Vox	Gallardo Vox	Other/ None/ Not care	Question	Lead
CIS	27 Jan–2 Feb 2022	3,918	23.2	20.7	4.7	4.1	–	3.9	12.9	30.5	2.5
40dB/Prisa	26 Jan–2 Feb 2022	1,123	18.9	18.3	9.3	5.0	–	5.6	42.8	–	0.6
GESOP/La Opinión de Zamora	30–31 Jan 2022	801	17.9	25.2	6.3	3.9	–	4.1	15.8	26.8	7.3
CIS	7–22 Jan 2022	7,131	18.1	23.9	5.5	4.1	–	2.6	18.7	27.1	5.8
GAD3/NIUS	20–22 Dec 2021	1,000	16.0	26.0	3.0	2.0	5.0	–	23.0	25.0	10.0

== Voter turnout ==
The table below shows registered voter turnout during the election. Figures for election day do not include non-resident citizens, while final figures do.

Province	Time (Election day)										Final		
Province	11:30	14:00			18:00			20:00			Final		
Province	2022	2019	2022	+/–	2019	2022	+/–	2019	2022	+/–	2019	2022	+/–
Ávila	11.90%	40.68%	34.85%	−5.83	59.50%	52.62%	−6.88	77.04%	63.95%	−13.09	72.71%	60.22%	−12.49
Burgos	11.24%	35.65%	35.08%	−0.57	52.01%	51.05%	−0.96	69.03%	62.80%	−6.23	65.13%	59.02%	−6.11
León	10.01%	35.02%	32.00%	−3.02	50.95%	48.54%	−2.41	68.07%	60.16%	−7.91	61.02%	53.50%	−7.52
Palencia	11.24%	37.19%	34.75%	−2.44	54.69%	52.40%	−2.29	72.94%	64.95%	−7.99	69.37%	61.60%	−7.77
Salamanca	11.69%	37.17%	34.84%	−2.33	53.17%	51.01%	−2.16	69.79%	62.74%	−7.05	62.94%	56.37%	−6.57
Segovia	12.23%	39.86%	35.74%	−4.12	58.13%	53.31%	−4.82	74.59%	64.98%	−9.61	72.70%	63.15%	−9.55
Soria	12.20%	35.39%	36.15%	+0.76	52.00%	51.96%	−0.04	69.93%	65.80%	−4.13	63.93%	59.81%	−4.12
Valladolid	11.90%	37.16%	37.21%	+0.05	54.04%	55.06%	+1.02	71.21%	66.80%	−4.41	68.92%	64.72%	−4.20
Zamora	10.70%	37.67%	32.24%	−5.43	55.53%	48.87%	−6.66	72.17%	60.80%	−11.37	63.79%	53.28%	−10.51
Total	11.30%	36.89%	34.73%	–2.16	53.70%	51.62%	–2.08	70.81%	63.44%	–7.37	65.80%	58.75%	−7.05

== Results ==
=== Overall ===
← Summary of the 13 February 2022 Cortes of Castile and León election results →
Parties and alliances	Popular vote			Seats	
Parties and alliances	Votes	%	±pp	Total	+/−
People's Party (PP)	382,157	31.40	−0.10	31	+2
Spanish Socialist Workers' Party (PSOE)	365,434	30.02	−4.82	28	−7
Vox (Vox)	214,668	17.64	+12.14	13	+12
United We Can Castile and León (Podemos–IU–AV)^{1}	62,138	5.11	−2.18	1	−1
Citizens–Party of the Citizenry (Cs)	54,721	4.50	−10.44	1	−11
Leonese People's Union (UPL)	52,098	4.28	+2.24	3	+2
Empty Spain–Soria Now! (EV–SY)	39,040	3.21	New	3	+3
Empty Spain (España Vaciada)	19,655	1.61	New	0	±0
Soria Now! (SY)	19,385	1.59	New	3	+3
For Ávila (XAV)	13,875	1.14	+0.45	1	±0
Animalist Party Against Mistreatment of Animals (PACMA)	6,572	0.54	−0.09	0	±0
Castilian Party–Commoners' Land–Zero Cuts (PCAS–TC–RC)	2,851	0.23	New	0	±0
Coalition for El Bierzo–El Bierzo Exists (CBierzo–BEX)	2,521	0.21	−0.06	0	±0
Zamora Decides (Zamora Decide)^{2}	2,121	0.17	+0.03	0	±0
Communist Party of the Workers of Spain (PCTE)	1,359	0.11	+0.04	0	±0
For a Fairer World (PUM+J)	1,135	0.09	+0.08	0	±0
Regionalist Party of the Leonese Country (PREPAL)	962	0.08	−0.02	0	±0
For Zamora (Por Zamora)	814	0.07	New	0	±0
Blank Seats (EB)	626	0.05	New	0	±0
Centered (centrados)	511	0.04	−0.03	0	±0
Regionalist Union of Castile and León (Unión Regionalista)	401	0.03	−0.04	0	±0
Spanish Phalanx of the CNSO (FE de las JONS)	318	0.03	−0.02	0	±0
Volt Spain (Volt)	273	0.02	New	0	±0
You Contribute (TAB)	149	0.01	New	0	±0
State of Spain Unionist Party (PUEDE)	114	0.01	New	0	±0
Wake Up (Despierta)	113	0.01	New	0	±0
Progress Party of Castile and León Cities (PPCCAL)	23	0.00	New	0	±0
Blank ballots	12,170	1.00	−0.06		
Total	1,217,164			81	±0
Valid votes	1,217,164	98.91	−0.10		
Invalid votes	13,435	1.09	+0.10		
Votes cast / turnout	1,230,599	58.75	−7.05		
Abstentions	864,024	41.25	+7.05		
Registered voters	2,094,623				
Sources
Footnotes: ^{1} United We Can Castile and León results are compared to the combined totals of We Can–Equo and United Left–Anticapitalists in the 2019 election.; ^{2} Zamora Decides results are compared to the Decide Now totals in the 2019 election.

Popular vote
PP	31.40%
PSOE	30.02%
Vox	17.64%
Podemos–IU–AV	5.11%
Cs	4.50%
UPL	4.28%
EV–SY	3.21%
XAV	1.14%
Others	1.71%
Blank ballots	1.00%

Seats
PP	38.27%
PSOE	34.57%
Vox	16.05%
UPL	3.70%
EV–SY	3.70%
Podemos–IU–AV	1.23%
Cs	1.23%
XAV	1.23%

=== Distribution by constituency ===
Constituency	PP		PSOE		Vox		UP		Cs		UPL		EV–SY		XAV	
Constituency	%	S	%	S	%	S	%	S	%	S	%	S	%	S	%	S
Ávila	34.0	3	24.2	2	17.4	1	3.7	−	2.4	−					16.7	1
Burgos	30.9	4	32.6	5	16.6	2	6.2	−	5.0	−			5.6	−		
León	25.0	4	28.5	4	15.4	2	5.0	−	2.2	−	21.3	3				
Palencia	32.9	3	33.9	3	18.0	1	4.3	−	5.5	−			2.8	−		
Salamanca	38.8	5	29.6	3	18.0	2	3.5	−	4.9	−	1.0	−	1.9	−		
Segovia	34.7	3	31.4	2	19.5	1	6.0	−	4.9	−						
Soria	23.9	1	18.1	1	11.5	−	2.2	−	0.8	−			42.7	3		
Valladolid	30.9	5	31.3	5	20.0	3	6.9	1	6.9	1			1.6	−	0.1	−
Zamora	33.6	3	32.7	3	18.9	1	3.2	−	3.6	−	2.7	−				
Total	31.4	31	30.0	28	17.6	13	5.1	1	4.5	1	4.3	3	3.2	3	1.1	1

== Aftermath ==
=== Government formation ===
Although the PP emerged as the largest party in the election, their vote share and vote totals decreased from the 2019 election to their worst historical result in the region, despite early polls initially predicting a comfortable victory for the party, with close to a majority of seats in the regional parliament. Mañueco had been accused throughout the campaign of triggering the election in an attempt to emulate Isabel Díaz Ayuso's victory in the 2021 Madrilenian election. On election night, Vox's national leader Santiago Abascal proclaimed his candidate, Juan García-Gallardo, as the region's next vice president, while hinting that his party would not be satisfied with less power than was given to Cs following the 2019 government negotiations, and that Vox would not support Mañueco "for free".

Mañueco insisted in a PP minority government and warned Vox about "not taking a single step back" regarding women and LGBT rights. Prime Minister Pedro Sánchez suggested that PSOE would be willing to consider abstaining in favour of Mañueco's government to stop Vox having influence in the region, and he demanded that, for PSOE to support them, PP must explain why they did not want to rely on the far-right's support as well as terminating all PP–Vox agreements throughout Spain at all levels and forever.

In March 2022, PP and Vox formed a coalition government, with Vox taking three of ten ministerial positions including vice president for Juan García-Gallardo. Vox member Carlos Pollán was elected President of the Cortes of Castile and León, the position of speaker. The formation of the new government was endorsed by Alberto Núñez Feijóo, the sole candidate in the PP's upcoming leadership election, although he said he would not repeat it on the national level. Donald Tusk, leader of the European People's Party of which the Spanish party is a member, condemned the pact as "a sad surprise... I hope that it's just an incident or accident, not a trend in Spanish politics".

Investiture; Nomination of Alfonso Fernández Mañueco (PP)
Ballot →	11 April 2022
Required majority →	41 out of 81
Yes: • PP (31); • Vox (13)	44 / 81
No: • PSOE (28); • UPL (3); • SY (3); • Podemos (1); • Cs (1); • XAV (1)	37 / 81
Abstentions	0 / 81
Absentees	0 / 81

== Bibliography ==
- Ley Orgánica 5/1985, de 19 de junio, del Régimen Electoral General (Organic Law 5/1985). Official State Gazette (in Spanish). 19 June 1985 [version as of 7 July 2021]. BOE-A-1985-11672.
- Ley 3/1987, de 30 de marzo, Electoral de Castilla y León (Law 3/1987). Official State Gazette (in Spanish). 30 March 1987 [version as of 6 July 2017]. BOE-A-1987-9475.
- Ley 3/2001, de 3 de julio, del Gobierno y de la Administración de la Comunidad de Castilla y León (Law 3/2001). Official State Gazette (in Spanish). 3 July 2001 [version as of 25 February 2021]. BOE-A-2001-14243.
- Ley Orgánica 14/2007, de 30 de noviembre, de reforma del Estatuto de Autonomía de Castilla y León (Organic Law 14/2007). Official State Gazette (in Spanish). 30 November 2007 [version as of 11 April 2011]. BOE-A-2007-20635.
- Decreto 2/2021, de 20 de diciembre, del Presidente de la Junta de Castilla y León, por el que se disuelven anticipadamente las Cortes de Castilla y León y se convocan elecciones a las Cortes de Castilla y León (PDF) (Decree 2/2021). Official Gazette of Castile and León (in Spanish). 20 December 2021. BOCYL-D-21122021-1.
