= Burgos (Cortes of Castile and León constituency) =

Coordinates: 42°23′N 3°40′W

- Cortes of Castile and León; Electoral constituency
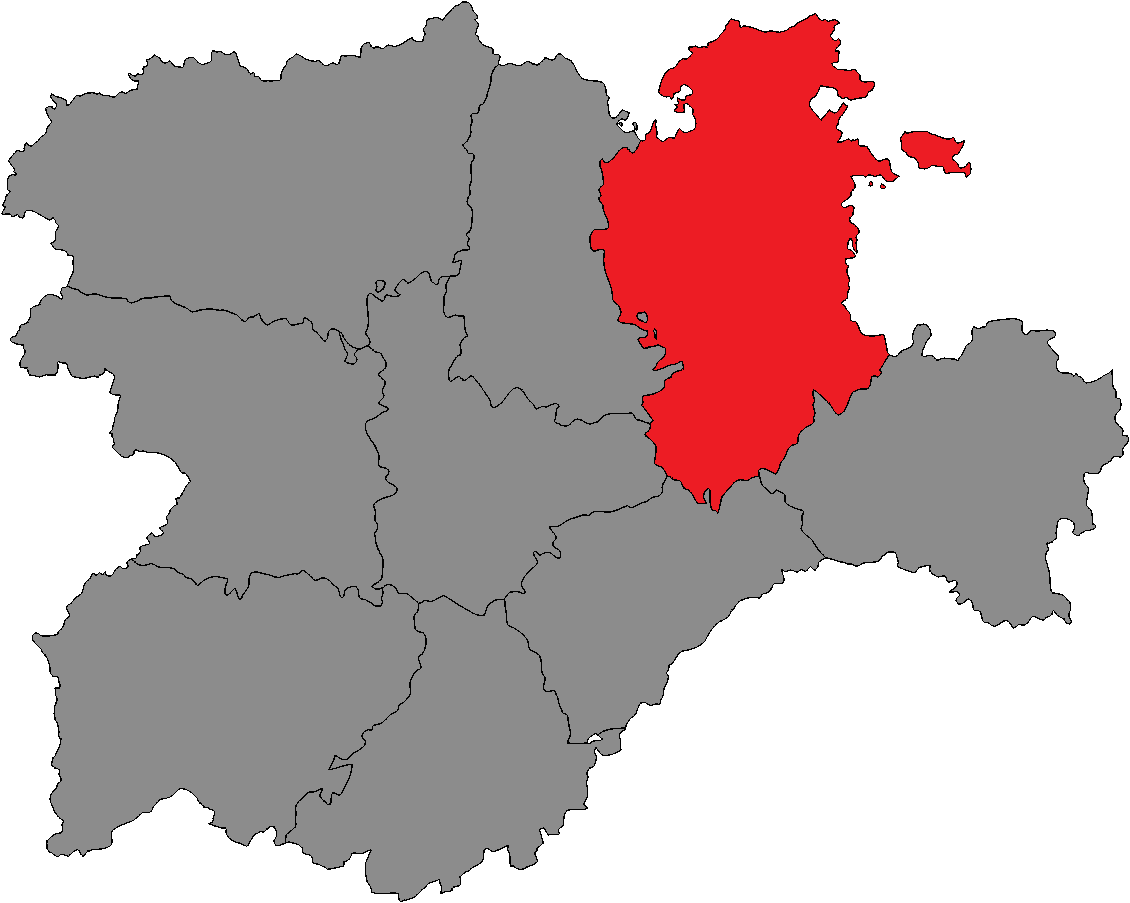
- Location of Burgos within Castile and León
- Province: Burgos
- Autonomous community: Castile and León
- Population: ▲361,556 (2025)
- Electorate: ▲299,425 (2026)
- Major settlements: Burgos

Current constituency
- Created: 1983
- Seats: 11
- Members: PP (5); PSOE (4); Vox (2)

Burgos is one of the nine constituencies (Spanish: circunscripciones) represented in the Cortes of Castile and León, the regional legislature of the Autonomous Community of Castile and León. The constituency currently elects 11 deputies. Its boundaries correspond to those of the Spanish province of Burgos. The electoral system uses the D'Hondt method and closed-list proportional representation, with a minimum threshold of three percent.

== Electoral system ==
The constituency was created as per the Statute of Autonomy of Castile and León of 1983 and was first contested in the 1983 regional election. The Statute provided for the nine provinces in Castile and León—Ávila, Burgos, León, Palencia, Salamanca, Segovia, Soria, Valladolid and Zamora—to be established as multi-member districts in the Cortes of Castile and León, with this regulation being maintained under the 1987 regional electoral law. Each constituency is entitled to an initial minimum of three seats, with one additional member per each 45,000 inhabitants or fraction greater than 22,500.

Voting is on the basis of universal suffrage, which comprises all nationals over eighteen, registered in Castile and León and in full enjoyment of their political rights. Amendments to the electoral law in 2011 required for Castilian-Leonese people abroad to apply for voting before being permitted to vote, a system known as "begged" or expat vote (Spanish: Voto rogado) which was abolished in 2022. Seats are elected using the D'Hondt method and a closed list proportional representation, with an electoral threshold of three percent of valid votes—which includes blank ballots—being applied in each constituency. The use of the D'Hondt method might result in a higher effective threshold, depending on the district magnitude.

The electoral law allows for parties and federations registered in the interior ministry, coalitions and groupings of electors to present lists of candidates. Parties and federations intending to form a coalition ahead of an election are required to inform the relevant Electoral Commission within ten days of the election call—fifteen before 1985—whereas groupings of electors need to secure the signature of at least one percent of the electorate in the constituencies for which they seek election—one-thousandth of the electorate, with a compulsory minimum of 500 signatures, until 1985—disallowing electors from signing for more than one list of candidates.

== Procurators ==
Procurators 1983–present
Key to parties IU TC–PNC Podemos PSOE CDS Cs SI PDL PP CP AP Vox
Cortes	Election	Distribution
1st	1983	4 / 1 / 6
2nd	1987	4 / 2 / 1 / 4
3rd	1991	5 / 6
4th	1995	1 / 3 / 7
5th	1999	1 / 4 / 6
6th	2003	4 / 7
7th	2007	4 / 7
8th	2011	4 / 7
9th	2015	2 / 3 / 1 / 5
10th	2019	1 / 5 / 2 / 3
11th	2022	5 / 4 / 2
12th	2026	4 / 5 / 2

== Regional elections ==
=== 2026 ===
Summary of the 15 March 2026 Cortes of Castile and León election results in Burgos
Parties and alliances	Popular vote			Seats	
Parties and alliances	Votes	%	±pp	Total	+/−
People's Party (PP)	63,143	35.12	+4.20	5	+1
Spanish Socialist Workers' Party (PSOE)	61,531	34.23	+1.66	4	–1
Vox (Vox)	33,114	18.42	+1.85	2	±0
United Left, Unite Movement, Greens Equo: In Common (IU–MS–VQ)^{1}	3,961	2.20	n/a	0	±0
Municipalist Burgalese Way (VBM)	3,621	2.01	–3.56	0	±0
The Party is Over (SALF)	3,311	1.84	New	0	±0
We Can–Green Alliance CyL 2026 (Podemos–AV)^{1}	1,945	1.08	n/a	0	±0
Castilian Party–Commoners' Land (PCAS–TC)	1,149	0.64	+0.17	0	±0
Blank Seats to Leave Empty Seats (EB)	1,110	0.62	+0.26	0	±0
Animalist Party with the Environment (PACMA)^{2}	1,047	0.58	–0.15	0	±0
Citizens–Party of the Citizenry (Cs)	1,008	0.56	–4.43	0	±0
For a Fairer World (M+J)	547	0.30	New	0	±0
Decide NineCyL (Decide–NueveCyL)	501	0.28	New	0	±0
Communist Party of the Workers of Spain (PCTE)	490	0.27	+0.04	0	±0
Blank ballots	3,292	1.83	+0.50		
Total	179,770			11	±0
Valid votes	179,770	98.49	–0.27		
Invalid votes	2,753	1.51	+0.27		
Votes cast / turnout	182,523	60.96	+1.94		
Abstentions	116,905	39.04	–1.94		
Registered voters	299,428				
Sources
Footnotes: ^{1} Within the United We Can Castile and León alliance in the 2022 election.; ^{2} Animalist Party with the Environment results are compared to Animalist Party Against Mistreatment of Animals totals in the 2022 election.

=== 2022 ===
Summary of the 13 February 2022 Cortes of Castile and León election results in Burgos
Parties and alliances	Popular vote			Seats	
Parties and alliances	Votes	%	±pp	Total	+/−
Spanish Socialist Workers' Party (PSOE)	56,466	32.57	–4.41	5	±0
People's Party (PP)	53,595	30.92	+2.84	4	+1
Vox (Vox)	28,726	16.57	+10.42	2	+2
United We Can Castile and León (Podemos–IU–AV)^{1}	10,827	6.25	–2.82	0	–1
Burgalese Way (España Vaciada)	9,650	5.57	New	0	±0
Citizens–Party of the Citizenry (Cs)	8,648	4.99	–12.33	0	–2
Animalist Party Against Mistreatment of Animals (PACMA)	1,273	0.73	–0.11	0	±0
Castilian Party–Commoners' Land–Zero Cuts (PCAS–TC–RC)	813	0.47	New	0	±0
Blank Seats (EB)	626	0.36	New	0	±0
Communist Party of the Workers of Spain (PCTE)	407	0.23	+0.01	0	±0
Blank ballots	2,313	1.33	+0.18		
Total	173,344			11	±0
Valid votes	173,344	98.76	–0.24		
Invalid votes	2,175	1.24	+0.24		
Votes cast / turnout	175,519	59.02	–6.11		
Abstentions	121,887	40.98	+6.11		
Registered voters	297,406				
Sources
Footnotes: ^{1} United We Can Castile and León results are compared to the combined totals of We Can–Equo and United Left–Anticapitalists in the 2019 election.

=== 2019 ===
Summary of the 26 May 2019 Cortes of Castile and León election results in Burgos
Parties and alliances	Popular vote			Seats	
Parties and alliances	Votes	%	±pp	Total	+/−
Spanish Socialist Workers' Party (PSOE)	71,311	36.98	+12.27	5	+2
People's Party (PP)	54,148	28.08	–8.40	3	–2
Citizens–Party of the Citizenry (Cs)	33,408	17.32	+5.25	2	+1
We Can–Equo (Podemos–Equo)	13,886	7.20	–7.00	1	–1
Vox (Vox)	11,856	6.15	+5.04	0	±0
United Left–Anticapitalists (IU–Anticapitalistas–PCAS/TC–ALTER)^{1}	3,598	1.87	–2.89	0	±0
Animalist Party Against Mistreatment of Animals (PACMA)	1,615	0.84	New	0	±0
Communist Party of the Workers of Spain (PCTE)	424	0.22	New	0	±0
With You, We Are Democracy (Contigo)	385	0.20	New	0	±0
Blank ballots	2,220	1.15	–1.31		
Total	192,851			11	±0
Valid votes	192,851	99.00	+1.06		
Invalid votes	1,948	1.00	–1.06		
Votes cast / turnout	194,799	65.13	+1.42		
Abstentions	104,299	34.87	–1.42		
Registered voters	299,098				
Sources
Footnotes: ^{1} United Left–Anticapitalists results are compared to the combined totals of United Left–Equo: Convergence for Castile and León and Castilian Party–Commoners' Land: Pact in the 2015 election.

=== 2015 ===
Summary of the 24 May 2015 Cortes of Castile and León election results in Burgos
Parties and alliances	Popular vote			Seats	
Parties and alliances	Votes	%	±pp	Total	+/−
People's Party (PP)	68,706	36.48	–14.21	5	–2
Spanish Socialist Workers' Party (PSOE)	46,542	24.71	–2.45	3	–1
We Can (Podemos)	26,740	14.20	New	2	+2
Citizens–Party of the Citizenry (C's)	22,728	12.07	New	1	+1
United Left–Equo: Convergence for Castile and León (IU–Equo)	7,312	3.88	–0.63	0	±0
Union, Progress and Democracy (UPyD)	3,477	1.85	–3.13	0	±0
Let's Win the Fracking Castile and León (Ganemos al Fracking)	2,445	1.30	New	0	±0
Vox (Vox)	2,098	1.11	New	0	±0
Castilian Party–Commoners' Land: Pact (PCAS–TC–Pacto)	1,656	0.88	–3.55	0	±0
Party for Freedom–With Clean Hands (PxL)	934	0.50	New	0	±0
Internationalist Solidarity and Self-Management (SAIn)	581	0.31	–0.05	0	±0
Communist Party of the Peoples of Spain (PCPE)	503	0.27	New	0	±0
Blank ballots	4,624	2.46	–1.38		
Total	188,346			11	±0
Valid votes	188,346	97.94	–0.12		
Invalid votes	3,955	2.06	+0.12		
Votes cast / turnout	192,301	63.71	–1.81		
Abstentions	109,530	36.29	+1.81		
Registered voters	301,831				

=== 2011 ===
Summary of the 22 May 2011 Cortes of Castile and León election results in Burgos
Parties and alliances	Popular vote			Seats	
Parties and alliances	Votes	%	±pp	Total	+/−
People's Party (PP)	98,448	50.69	–0.93	7	±0
Spanish Socialist Workers' Party (PSOE)	52,740	27.16	–8.15	4	±0
Union, Progress and Democracy (UPyD)	9,668	4.98	New	0	±0
United Left of Castile and León (IUCyL)	8,755	4.51	+1.13	0	±0
Party of Castile and León (PCAL)^{1}	8,610	4.43	–0.01	0	±0
The Greens–Green Group (LV–GV)	2,619	1.35	New	0	±0
Citizens of Burgos for Old Castile (CiBu)	2,001	1.03	+0.47	0	±0
National Democracy (DN)	1,451	0.75	+0.33	0	±0
Anti-Bullfighting Party Against Mistreatment of Animals (PACMA)	909	0.47	New	0	±0
Merindades of Castile Initiative (IMC)	854	0.44	New	0	±0
Internationalist Solidarity and Self-Management (SAIn)	691	0.36	New	0	±0
Blank ballots	7,462	3.84	+1.33		
Total	194,208			11	±0
Valid votes	194,208	98.06	–1.06		
Invalid votes	3,852	1.94	+1.06		
Votes cast / turnout	198,060	65.52	–2.57		
Abstentions	104,224	34.48	+2.57		
Registered voters	302,284				
Sources
Footnotes: ^{1} Party of Castile and León results are compared to Commoners' Land–Alternative for Castile and León totals in the 2007 election.

=== 2007 ===
Summary of the 27 May 2007 Cortes of Castile and León election results in Burgos
Parties and alliances	Popular vote			Seats	
Parties and alliances	Votes	%	±pp	Total	+/−
People's Party (PP)	105,289	51.62	–1.59	7	±0
Spanish Socialist Workers' Party (PSOE)	72,020	35.31	+1.74	4	±0
Commoners' Land–Alternative for Castile and León (TC–ACAL)	9,055	4.44	–0.11	0	±0
United Left–The Greens–Commitment for Castile and León (IU–LV–CyL)	6,885	3.38	–0.76	0	±0
The Greens (LV)	2,264	1.11	New	0	±0
Citizens of Burgos (CiBu)	1,148	0.56	New	0	±0
National Democracy (DN)	847	0.42	New	0	±0
Republican Left (IR)	807	0.40	+0.16	0	±0
Citizens' Group (AGRUCI)	523	0.26	New	0	±0
Blank ballots	5,118	2.51	–0.60		
Total	203,956			11	±0
Valid votes	203,956	99.12	+0.10		
Invalid votes	1,816	0.88	–0.10		
Votes cast / turnout	205,772	68.09	–3.53		
Abstentions	96,446	31.91	+3.53		
Registered voters	302,218				

=== 2003 ===
Summary of the 25 May 2003 Cortes of Castile and León election results in Burgos
Parties and alliances	Popular vote			Seats	
Parties and alliances	Votes	%	±pp	Total	+/−
People's Party (PP)	114,482	53.21	+4.48	7	+1
Spanish Socialist Workers' Party (PSOE)	72,219	33.57	+2.01	4	±0
Commoners' Land–Castilian Nationalist Party (TC–PNC)	9,789	4.55	–2.90	0	–1
United Left of Castile and León (IUCyL)	8,905	4.14	–2.67	0	±0
Democratic and Social Centre (CDS)	764	0.36	–0.32	0	±0
Castilian Left (IzCa)	743	0.35	New	0	±0
Humanist Party (PH)	565	0.26	–0.10	0	±0
Republican Left (IR)	519	0.24	New	0	±0
Spanish Democratic Party (PADE)	465	0.22	–0.65	0	±0
Blank ballots	6,691	3.11	+0.06		
Total	215,142			11	±0
Valid votes	215,142	99.02	±0.00		
Invalid votes	2,129	0.98	±0.00		
Votes cast / turnout	217,271	71.62	+5.51		
Abstentions	86,112	28.38	–5.51		
Registered voters	303,383				

=== 1999 ===
Summary of the 13 June 1999 Cortes of Castile and León election results in Burgos
Parties and alliances	Popular vote			Seats	
Parties and alliances	Votes	%	±pp	Total	+/−
People's Party (PP)	96,689	48.73	–4.03	6	–1
Spanish Socialist Workers' Party (PSOE)	62,618	31.56	+6.67	4	+1
Commoners' Land–Castilian Nationalist Party (TC–PNC)	14,779	7.45	+4.77	1	+1
United Left of Castile and León (IUCyL)	13,508	6.81	–5.85	0	–1
Spanish Democratic Party (PADE)	1,725	0.87	New	0	±0
Centrist Union–Democratic and Social Centre (UC–CDS)	1,344	0.68	New	0	±0
Regionalist Unity of Castile and León (URCL)	981	0.49	New	0	±0
Humanist Party (PH)	709	0.36	New	0	±0
Blank ballots	6,046	3.05	+0.75		
Total	198,399			11	±0
Valid votes	198,399	99.02	–0.04		
Invalid votes	1,960	0.98	+0.04		
Votes cast / turnout	200,359	66.11	–4.04		
Abstentions	102,704	33.89	+4.04		
Registered voters	303,063				

=== 1995 ===
Summary of the 28 May 1995 Cortes of Castile and León election results in Burgos
Parties and alliances	Popular vote			Seats	
Parties and alliances	Votes	%	±pp	Total	+/−
People's Party (PP)	108,800	52.76	+8.75	7	+1
Spanish Socialist Workers' Party (PSOE)	51,338	24.89	–9.14	3	–2
United Left of Castile and León (IU)	26,115	12.66	+6.09	1	+1
Independent Solution (SI)	9,107	4.42	New	0	±0
Commoners' Land–Castilian Nationalist Party (TC–PNC)	5,537	2.68	+2.01	0	±0
Party of El Bierzo (PB)	576	0.28	New	0	±0
Blank ballots	4,752	2.30	+0.59		
Total	206,225			11	±0
Valid votes	206,225	99.06	+0.12		
Invalid votes	1,948	0.94	–0.12		
Votes cast / turnout	208,173	70.15	+4.16		
Abstentions	88,574	29.85	–4.16		
Registered voters	296,747				

=== 1991 ===
Summary of the 26 May 1991 Cortes of Castile and León election results in Burgos
Parties and alliances	Popular vote			Seats	
Parties and alliances	Votes	%	±pp	Total	+/−
People's Party (PP)^{1}	82,822	44.01	+2.02	6	+1
Spanish Socialist Workers' Party (PSOE)	64,046	34.03	–0.38	5	+1
United Left (IU)	12,365	6.57	+2.64	0	±0
Democratic and Social Centre (CDS)	11,003	5.85	–11.24	0	–2
Burgalese Popular Action (APB)	6,493	3.45	New	0	±0
The Greens (LV)	3,296	1.75	New	0	±0
Castilian Regionalist Party (PREC)	2,363	1.26	New	0	±0
Commoners' Land (TC)	1,270	0.67	New	0	±0
Castilianist Union (UC)	808	0.43	New	0	±0
Communist Party of the Peoples of Spain (PCPE)	520	0.28	New	0	±0
Blank ballots	3,212	1.71	+1.01		
Total	188,198			11	±0
Valid votes	188,198	98.94	+1.41		
Invalid votes	2,023	1.06	–1.41		
Votes cast / turnout	190,221	65.99	–4.66		
Abstentions	98,058	34.01	+4.66		
Registered voters	288,279				
Sources
Footnotes: ^{1} People's Party results are compared to the combined totals of People's Alliance, People's Democratic Party and Independent Solution in the 1987 election.

=== 1987 ===
Summary of the 10 June 1987 Cortes of Castile and León election results in Burgos
Parties and alliances	Popular vote			Seats	
Parties and alliances	Votes	%	±pp	Total	+/−
Spanish Socialist Workers' Party (PSOE)	66,241	34.41	–2.49	4	±0
People's Alliance (AP)^{1}	58,300	30.29	n/a	4	+1
Democratic and Social Centre (CDS)	32,904	17.09	+12.49	2	+2
Independent Solution (SI)	19,282	10.02	New	1	+1
United Left (IU)^{2}	7,573	3.93	+0.24	0	±0
People's Democratic Party (PDP)^{1}	3,238	1.68	n/a	0	–2
Nationalist Party of Castile and León (PNCL–PANCAL)^{1}	1,416	0.74	n/a	0	±0
Workers' Party of Spain–Communist Unity (PTE–UC)	1,227	0.64	New	0	±0
Humanist Platform (PH)	964	0.50	New	0	±0
Liberal Democratic Party (PDL)	n/a	n/a	–7.86	0	–1
Liberal Party (PL)^{1}	n/a	n/a	n/a	0	–1
Blank ballots	1,350	0.70	–0.38		
Total	192,495			11	±0
Valid votes	192,495	97.53	–0.70		
Invalid votes	4,880	2.47	+0.70		
Votes cast / turnout	197,375	70.65	+2.48		
Abstentions	81,601	29.35	–2.48		
Registered voters	279,376				
Sources
Footnotes: ^{1} Within the People's Coalition alliance in the 1983 election.; ^{2} United Left results are compared to Communist Party of Spain totals in the 1983 election.

=== 1983 ===
Summary of the 8 May 1983 Cortes of Castile and León election results in Burgos
Parties and alliances	Popular vote			Seats	
Parties and alliances	Votes	%	±pp	Total	+/−
People's Coalition (AP–PDP–UL)	83,772	45.27	n/a	6	n/a
Spanish Socialist Workers' Party (PSOE)	68,290	36.90	n/a	4	n/a
Liberal Democratic Party (PDL)	14,543	7.86	n/a	1	n/a
Democratic and Social Centre (CDS)	8,506	4.60	n/a	0	n/a
Communist Party of Castile and León (PCCL–PCE)	6,821	3.69	n/a	0	n/a
Spanish Communist Workers' Party–Unified Communist Party (PCOE–PCEU)	1,126	0.61	n/a	0	n/a
Blank ballots	1,993	1.08	n/a		
Total	185,051			11	n/a
Valid votes	185,051	98.23	n/a		
Invalid votes	3,326	1.77	n/a		
Votes cast / turnout	188,377	68.17	n/a		
Abstentions	87,937	31.83	n/a		
Registered voters	276,314				
