= 2015 Castilian-Leonese regional election =

Election in the Spanish region of Castile and León

- 24 May 2015

All 84 seats in the Cortes of Castile and León 43 seats needed for a majority
- Opinion polls
- Registered: 2,151,993 ▼0.7%
- Turnout: 1,391,797 (64.7%) ▼2.8 pp
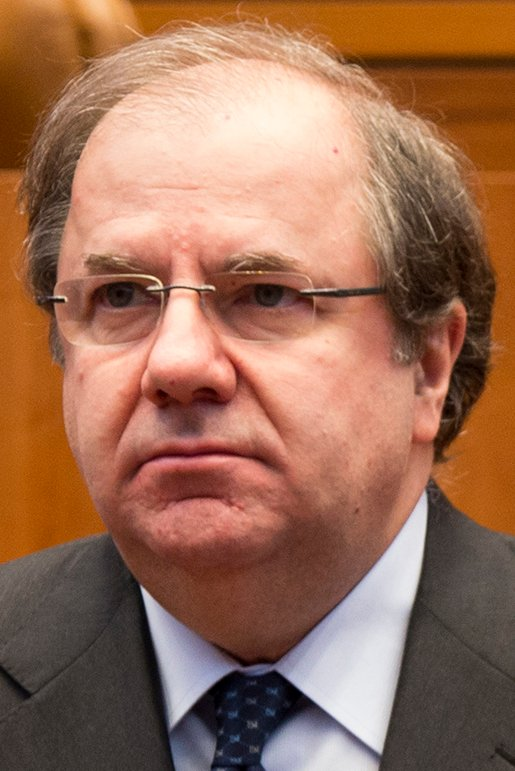

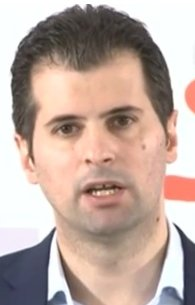

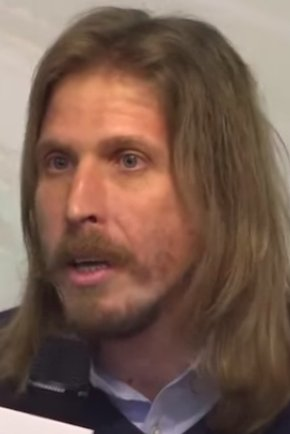

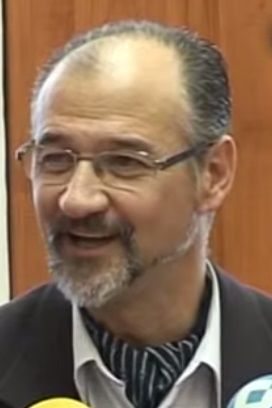

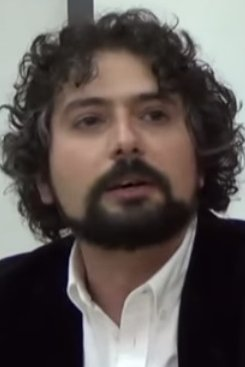

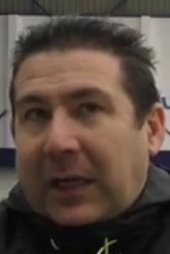
	First party	Second party	Third party
Leader	Juan Vicente Herrera	Luis Tudanca	Pablo Fernández
Party	PP	PSOE	Podemos
Leader since	16 March 2001	18 October 2014	14 February 2015
Leader's seat	Burgos	Burgos	León
Last election	53 seats, 51.6%	29 seats, 29.7%	Did not contest
Seats won	42	25	10
Seat change	▼11	▼4	▲10
Popular vote	514,301	353,575	165,475
Percentage	37.7%	25.9%	12.1%
Swing	▼13.9 pp	▼3.7 pp	New party
	Fourth party	Fifth party	Sixth party
Leader	Luis Fuentes	José Sarrión	Luis Mariano Santos
Party	C's	IU–Equo	UPL
Leader since	14 March 2015	15 February 2015	27 March 2015
Leader's seat	Valladolid	Valladolid	León
Last election	0 seats, 0.3% (Note: Results for UPSa–C's in the 2011 election.)	1 seat, 4.9%	1 seat, 1.9%
Seats won	5	1	1
Seat change	▲5	0	0
Popular vote	139,954	56,516	19,176
Percentage	10.3%	4.1%	1.4%
Swing	▲10.0 pp	▼0.8 pp	▼0.5 pp
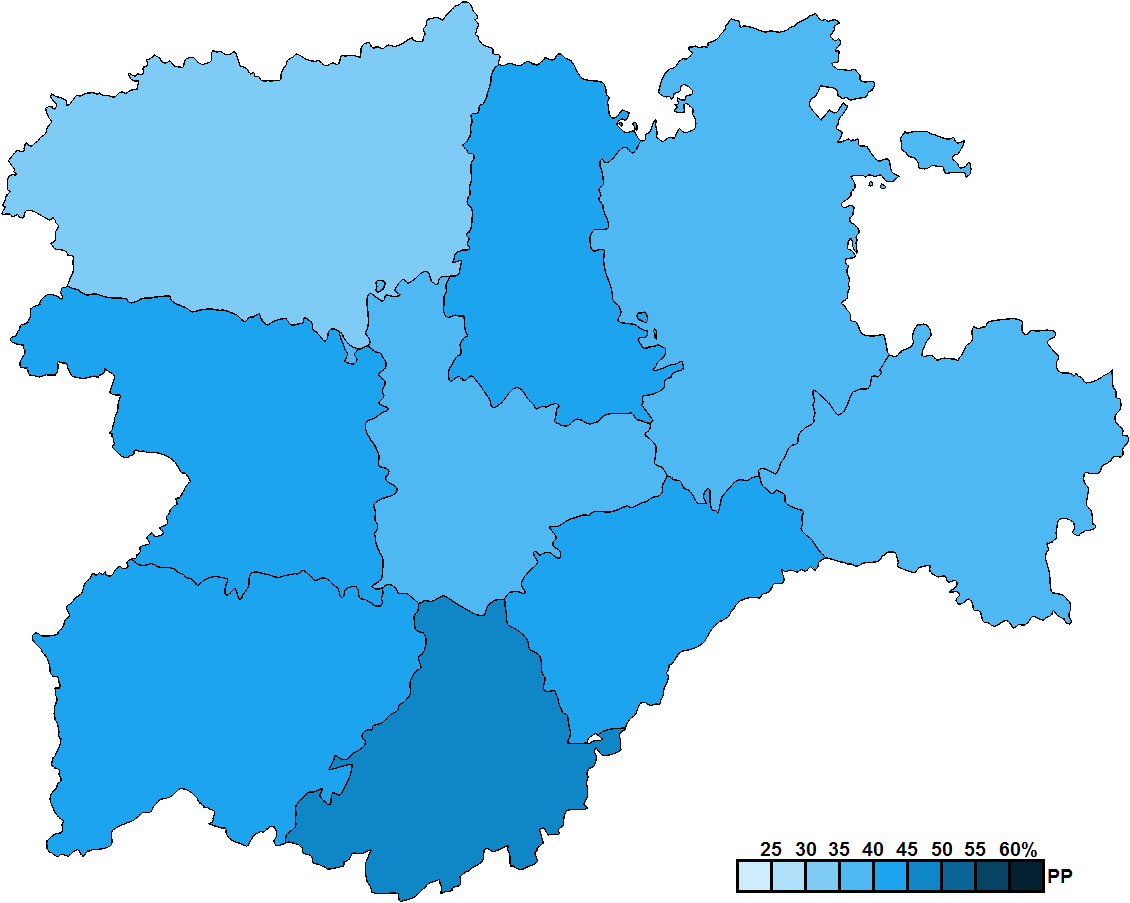
President before election
Juan Vicente Herrera
PP
President after election
Juan Vicente Herrera
PP

A regional election was held in Castile and León on 24 May 2015 to elect the 9th Cortes of the autonomous community. All 84 seats in the Cortes were up for election. It was held concurrently with regional elections in twelve other autonomous communities and local elections all across Spain.

The ruling People's Party (PP) sustained a sharp decline in its support, with a decrease of almost fourteen percentage points in the vote share and falling short of an overall majority for the first time since 1987. Concurrently, the opposition Spanish Socialist Workers' Party (PSOE) secured its worst historical result with only 25.9% and 25 seats, whereas the Leonese People's Union (UPL) had its worst showing since 1991. Newcomers Podemos (Spanish for "We Can") and Citizens (C's) made substantial inroads, both securing over 10% of the share.

The election result forced the PP candidate and incumbent regional president Juan Vicente Herrera to secure the support of C's in order to be re-elected for a fifth term in office, which would also end up being his last.

== Overview ==
Under the 2007 Statute of Autonomy, the Cortes of Castile and León was the unicameral legislature of the homonymous autonomous community, having legislative power in devolved matters, as well as the ability to grant or withdraw confidence from a regional president. The electoral and procedural rules were supplemented by national law provisions.

=== Date ===
The term of the Cortes of Castile and León expired four years after the date of its previous election, unless it was dissolved earlier. The election decree was required to be issued no later than 25 days before the scheduled expiration date of parliament and published on the following day in the Official Gazette of Castile and León (BOCYL), with election day taking place 54 days after the decree's publication. The previous election was held on 22 May 2011, which meant that the chamber's term would have expired on 22 May 2015. The election decree was required to be published in the BOCYL no later than 28 April 2015, setting the latest possible date for election day on 21 June 2015.

The regional president had the prerogative to dissolve the Cortes of Castile and León at any given time and call a snap election, provided that no motion of no confidence was in process and that dissolution did not occur either during the first legislative session or before one year after a previous one. In the event of an investiture process failing to elect a regional president within a two-month period from the first ballot, the Cortes were to be automatically dissolved and a fresh election called.

The Cortes of Castile and León was officially dissolved on 31 March 2015 with the publication of the corresponding decree in the BOCYL, setting election day for 24 May and scheduling for the chamber to reconvene on 16 June.

=== Electoral system ===
Voting for the Cortes was based on universal suffrage, comprising all Spanish nationals over 18 years of age, registered in Castile and León and with full political rights, provided that they had not been deprived of the right to vote by a final sentence, nor were legally incapacitated. Additionally, non-resident citizens were required to apply for voting, a system known as "begged" voting (Spanish: Voto rogado).

The Cortes of Castile and León had three seats per each multi-member constituency—corresponding to the provinces of Ávila, Burgos, León, Palencia, Salamanca, Segovia, Soria, Valladolid and Zamora—plus one additional seat per 45,000 inhabitants or fraction above 22,500. All were elected using the D'Hondt method and closed-list proportional voting, with a three percent-threshold of valid votes (including blank ballots) in each constituency. The use of this electoral method resulted in a higher effective threshold depending on district magnitude and vote distribution.

As a result of the aforementioned allocation, each Cortes constituency was entitled the following seats:

Seats	Constituencies
15	Valladolid
14	León
11	Burgos, Salamanca
7	Ávila, Palencia, Segovia, Zamora
5	Soria

The law did not provide for by-elections to fill vacant seats; instead, any vacancies arising after the proclamation of candidates and during the legislative term were filled by the next candidates on the party lists or, when required, by designated substitutes.

=== Outgoing parliament ===
The table below shows the composition of the parliamentary groups in the chamber at the time of dissolution.

Parliamentary composition in March 2015
Groups	Parties	Legislators	
Groups	Parties	Seats	Total
People's Parliamentary Group	PP	53	53
Socialist Parliamentary Group	PSOE	29	29
Mixed Parliamentary Group	IUCyL	1	2
Mixed Parliamentary Group	UPL	1	2

== Parties and candidates ==
The electoral law allowed for parties and federations registered in the interior ministry, alliances and groupings of electors to present lists of candidates. Parties and federations intending to form an alliance were required to inform the relevant electoral commission within 10 days of the election call, whereas groupings of electors needed to secure the signature of at least one percent of the electorate in the constituencies for which they sought election, disallowing electors from signing for more than one list. Additionally, a balanced composition of men and women was required in the electoral lists, so that candidates of either sex made up at least 40 percent of the total composition.

Below is a list of the main parties and alliances which contested the election:

Candidacy	Parties and alliances	Leading candidate	Ideology	Previous result		Gov.	Ref.
Candidacy	Parties and alliances	Leading candidate	Ideology	Vote %	Seats	Gov.	Ref.
PP	List: People's Party (PP)	Juan Vicente Herrera	Conservatism; Christian democracy	51.6%	53	Yes	
PSOE	List: Spanish Socialist Workers' Party (PSOE)	Luis Tudanca	Social democracy	29.7%	29	No	
IU–Equo	List: United Left of Castile and León (IUCyL) – Communist Party of Castile and León (PCCyL) – The Dawn Marxist Organization (La Aurora (OM)) – Republican Left (IR) – Open Left (IzAb); Equo (Equo)	José Sarrión	Socialism; Communism	4.9%	1	No	
UPL	List: Leonese People's Union (UPL)	Luis Mariano Santos	Leonesism; Regionalism; Autonomism	1.9%	1	No	
C's	List: Citizens–Party of the Citizenry (C's)	Luis Fuentes	Liberalism	0.3%	0	No	
Podemos	List: We Can (Podemos)	Pablo Fernández	Left-wing populism Direct democracy Democratic socialism	Did not contest		No	

== Opinion polls ==
The tables below list opinion polling results in reverse chronological order, showing the most recent first and using the dates when the survey fieldwork was done, as opposed to the date of publication. Where the fieldwork dates are unknown, the date of publication is given instead. The highest percentage figure in each polling survey is displayed with its background shaded in the leading party's colour. If a tie ensues, this is applied to the figures with the highest percentages. The "Lead" column on the right shows the percentage-point difference between the parties with the highest percentages in a poll.

=== Voting intention estimates ===
The table below lists weighted voting intention estimates. Refusals are generally excluded from the party vote percentages, while question wording and the treatment of "don't know" responses and those not intending to vote may vary between polling organisations. When available, seat projections determined by the polling organisations are displayed below (or in place of) the percentages in a smaller font; 43 seats were required for an absolute majority in the Cortes of Castile and León.

Color key:

Poll conducted after legal ban on opinion polls

Polling firm/Commissioner	Fieldwork date	Sample size	Turnout	PP	PSOE	IUCyL	UPyD	UPL	C's	Podemos	Vox	Lead
2015 regional election	24 May 2015	—N/a	64.9	37.7; 42	25.9; 25	4.1; 1	1.4; 0	1.4; 1	10.3; 5	12.1; 10	0.7; 0	11.8
GAD3/Antena 3	11–22 May 2015	?	?	? 39/42	? 23/25	? 1	–	? 0/1	? 8/10	? 8/10	–	?
NC Report/La Razón	17 May 2015	1,800	?	42.2; 43/44	24.7; 22/24	4.8; 0/1	1.1; 0	2.0; 0/1	12.6; 10/11	10.5; 7/8	–	17.5
GAD3/ABC	6–11 May 2015	550	?	39.2; 39/41	24.5; 22/24	4.2; 1	0.9; 0	0.6; 0/1	13.5; 11/12	11.8; 10/11	–	14.7
Madison MK/El Norte de Castilla	29 Apr–6 May 2015	1,906	?	38.9; 40/43	22.5; 22/23	5.7; 1	–	1.7; 1	13.2; 10/12	10.4; 6/8	–	16.4
Celeste-Tel/Edigrup	22–30 Apr 2015	2,700	64.7	44.3; 44	25.0; 24	4.6; 1	2.2; 0	2.2; 1	12.8; 10	7.3; 4	1.3; 0	19.3
CIS	23 Mar–19 Apr 2015	2,989	?	40.9; 43/44	22.9; 20/21	3.8; 1	2.0; 0	1.8; 1	11.1; 9	10.3; 8/10	–	18.0
Sigma Dos/Ical	12–24 Mar 2015	2,200	?	39.6; 39/43	22.2; 21/23	5.6; 1	–	1.3; 1	13.3; 9/10	13.8; 9/11	–	17.4
NC Report/La Razón	4–20 Mar 2015	1,800	?	39.3; 38/43	23.8; 22/24	4.3; 0/1	1.4; 0	1.7; 0/1	14.1; 10/11	12.7; 8/10	–	15.5
Pnyx/RTVCyL	29 Dec–3 Jan 2015	2,000	71	37.6; 40/43	24.1; 24	3.9; 1	6.1; 2/3	1.5; 1	5.6; 2/3	11.7; 10/12	2.3; 0	13.5
Llorente & Cuenca	31 Oct 2014	?	?	? 38/40	? 23/25	? 2/3	? 4	? 2	–	? 10/16	–	?
2014 EP election	25 May 2014	—N/a	45.9	37.5 (43)	23.4 (24)	8.3 (6)	8.3 (6)	–	2.7 (0)	8.1 (5)	2.5 (0)	14.1
NC Report/La Razón	15 Oct–12 Nov 2013	?	?	? 43/44	? 25/26	? 6/7	? 5/6	? 2/3	–	–	–	?
NC Report/La Razón	15 Apr–10 May 2013	400	?	44.9; 43/44	28.1; 26/27	? 5/6	? 5/6	? 2/3	–	–	–	16.8
2011 general election	20 Nov 2011	—N/a	71.3	55.4 (56)	29.2 (25)	5.6 (1)	6.1 (2)	–	–	–	–	26.2
2011 regional election	22 May 2011	—N/a	67.5	51.6; 53	29.7; 29	4.9; 1	3.3; 0	1.9; 1	0.3; 0	–	–	21.9

=== Voting preferences ===
The table below lists raw, unweighted voting preferences.

Polling firm/Commissioner	Fieldwork date	Sample size	PP	PSOE	IUCyL	UPyD	UPL	C's	Podemos	Question	X mark	Lead
2015 regional election (Note: Does not include non-resident citizens.)	24 May 2015	—N/a	25.5	17.5	2.8	1.0	1.0	6.9	8.2	—N/a	31.0	8.0
CIS	23 Mar–19 Apr 2015	2,989	20.3	12.5	2.6	0.7	0.4	7.3	7.7	34.6	10.2	7.8
2014 EP election	25 May 2014	—N/a	17.8	11.1	3.9	4.0	–	1.3	3.9	—N/a	51.3	6.7
2011 general election	20 Nov 2011	—N/a	41.0	21.6	4.2	4.5	–	–	–	—N/a	24.9	19.4
2011 regional election	22 May 2011	—N/a	36.0	20.6	3.4	2.3	1.3	–	–	—N/a	28.9	15.4

=== Victory preferences ===
The table below lists opinion polling on the victory preferences for each party in the event of a regional election taking place.

Polling firm/Commissioner	Fieldwork date	Sample size	PP	PSOE	IUCyL	UPyD	UPL	C's	Podemos	Other/ None	Question	Lead
CIS	23 Mar–19 Apr 2015	2,989	24.5	17.3	3.1	1.0	0.3	8.5	9.1	8.3	27.9	7.2

=== Victory likelihood ===
The table below lists opinion polling on the perceived likelihood of victory for each party in the event of a regional election taking place.

Polling firm/Commissioner	Fieldwork date	Sample size	PP	PSOE	UPyD	C's	Podemos	Other/ None	Question	Lead
CIS	23 Mar–19 Apr 2015	2,989	68.8	6.3	0.0	0.2	1.5	0.9	22.3	62.5

=== Preferred President ===
The table below lists opinion polling on leader preferences to become president of the Regional Government of Castile and León.

Polling firm/Commissioner	Fieldwork date	Sample size						Other/ None/ Not care	Question	Lead
Polling firm/Commissioner	Fieldwork date	Sample size	Herrera PP	Tudanca PSOE	Sarrión IUCyL	Fuentes C's	Fernández Podemos	Other/ None/ Not care	Question	Lead
CIS (Note: Responses denoting a party's generic candidate are aggregated to that party's main candidate/leader at the time of the poll.)	23 Mar–19 Apr 2015	2,989	25.7	9.7	1.4	1.6	2.3	2.8	56.3	16.0

== Results ==
=== Overall ===
← Summary of the 24 May 2015 Cortes of Castile and León election results →
Parties and alliances	Popular vote			Seats	
Parties and alliances	Votes	%	±pp	Total	+/−
People's Party (PP)	514,301	37.73	−13.82	42	−11
Spanish Socialist Workers' Party (PSOE)	353,575	25.94	−3.74	25	−4
We Can (Podemos)	165,475	12.14	New	10	+10
Citizens–Party of the Citizenry (C's)^{1}	139,954	10.27	+10.01	5	+5
United Left–Equo: Convergence for Castile and León (IU–Equo)	56,516	4.15	−0.72	1	±0
Union, Progress and Democracy (UPyD)	19,597	1.44	−1.84	0	±0
Leonese People's Union (UPL)	19,176	1.41	−0.45	1	±0
Independent Candidacy–Citizens of Democratic Centre (CI–CCD)^{2}	12,748	0.94	+0.19	0	±0
Vox (Vox)	9,333	0.68	New	0	±0
Animalist Party Against Mistreatment of Animals (PACMA)	7,263	0.53	+0.16	0	±0
Coalition for El Bierzo (CB)^{3}	5,032	0.37	+0.20	0	±0
Castilian Party–Commoners' Land: Pact (PCAS–TC–Pacto)	4,504	0.33	−0.61	0	±0
Let's Win the Fracking Castile and León (Ganemos al Fracking)	2,445	0.18	New	0	±0
Zamoran Independent Electors (ADEIZA)	2,380	0.17	−0.06	0	±0
Decide Now–Socialist Alternative (Ahora Decide–AS)	2,285	0.17	New	0	±0
Leonese Autonomist Party–Leonesist Unity (PAL–UL)	1,963	0.14	−0.13	0	±0
Spanish Phalanx of the CNSO (FE de las JONS)	1,779	0.13	+0.02	0	±0
Grouped Rural Citizens (CRA)	1,698	0.12	New	0	±0
Communist Party of the Peoples of Spain (PCPE)	1,408	0.10	+0.07	0	±0
Regionalist Party of the Leonese Country (PREPAL)	1,374	0.10	−0.04	0	±0
Internationalist Solidarity and Self-Management (SAIn)	973	0.07	−0.02	0	±0
Party for Freedom–With Clean Hands (PxL)	934	0.07	New	0	±0
National Democracy (DN)	896	0.07	−0.08	0	±0
Spanish Democratic Segovian Party (PSeDE)	874	0.06	New	0	±0
Regionalist Democracy of Castile and León (DRCyL)^{4}	848	0.06	−0.04	0	±0
United Free Citizens (CILUS)	742	0.05	New	0	±0
Regionalist Party of El Bierzo (PRB)	732	0.05	±0.00	0	±0
Cives (Cives)	628	0.05	New	0	±0
Blank Seats (EB)	348	0.03	New	0	±0
Blank ballots	33,274	2.44	−0.84		
Total	1,363,055			84	±0
Valid votes	1,363,055	97.93	−0.16		
Invalid votes	28,742	2.07	+0.16		
Votes cast / turnout	1,391,797	64.67	−2.83		
Abstentions	760,196	35.33	+2.83		
Registered voters	2,151,993				
Sources
Footnotes: ^{1} Citizens–Party of the Citizenry results are compared to Yes for Salamanca totals in the 2011 election.; ^{2} Independent Candidacy–Citizens of Democratic Centre results are compared to The Party of Castile and León–Independent Candidacy totals in the 2011 election.; ^{3} Coalition for El Bierzo results are compared to Party of El Bierzo totals in the 2011 election.; ^{4} Regionalist Democracy of Castile and León results are compared to Regionalist Unity of Castile and León totals in the 2011 election.

Popular vote
PP	37.73%
PSOE	25.94%
Podemos	12.14%
C's	10.27%
IU–Equo	4.15%
UPyD	1.44%
UPL	1.41%
Others	4.49%
Blank ballots	2.44%

Seats
PP	50.00%
PSOE	29.76%
Podemos	11.90%
C's	5.95%
IU–Equo	1.19%
UPL	1.19%

=== Distribution by constituency ===
Constituency	PP		PSOE		Podemos		C's		IU–Equo		UPL	
Constituency	%	S	%	S	%	S	%	S	%	S	%	S
Ávila	45.3	4	22.1	2	10.1	−	11.9	1	4.0	−		
Burgos	36.5	5	24.7	3	14.2	2	12.1	1	3.9	−		
León	32.1	5	27.3	5	12.6	2	8.9	1	3.4	−	7.0	1
Palencia	41.0	4	29.0	2	10.8	1	9.9	−	3.9	−		
Salamanca	41.5	6	25.3	3	10.8	1	13.3	1	3.0	−		
Segovia	40.0	4	27.5	2	11.3	1	9.1	−	3.6	−		
Soria	36.9	3	31.2	2	12.0	−	12.1	−	2.8	−		
Valladolid	35.7	7	25.0	4	13.1	2	8.9	1	6.2	1		
Zamora	41.3	4	25.5	2	11.0	1	7.8	−	4.3	−	0.7	−
Total	37.7	42	25.9	25	12.1	10	10.3	5	4.1	1	1.4	1

== Aftermath ==
=== Government formation ===
Investiture; Nomination of Juan Vicente Herrera (PP)
Ballot →	3 July 2015	3 July 2015
Required majority →	43 out of 84	Simple
Yes: • PP (42)	42 / 84	42 / 84
No: • PSOE (25); • Podemos (10); • IU (1); • UPL (1)	37 / 84	37 / 84
Abstentions: • C's (5)	5 / 84	5 / 84
Absentees	0 / 84	0 / 84

== Bibliography ==
- Ley Orgánica 5/1985, de 19 de junio, del Régimen Electoral General (Organic Law 5/1985). Official State Gazette (in Spanish). 19 June 1985 [version as of 31 March 2015]. BOE-A-1985-11672.
- Ley 3/1987, de 30 de marzo, Electoral de Castilla y León (Law 3/1987). Official State Gazette (in Spanish). 30 March 1987 [version as of 30 December 1998]. BOE-A-1987-9475.
- Ley 3/2001, de 3 de julio, del Gobierno y de la Administración de la Comunidad de Castilla y León (Law 3/2001). Official State Gazette (in Spanish). 3 July 2001 [version as of 19 September 2014]. BOE-A-2001-14243.
- Ley Orgánica 14/2007, de 30 de noviembre, de reforma del Estatuto de Autonomía de Castilla y León (Organic Law 14/2007). Official State Gazette (in Spanish). 30 November 2007 [version as of 11 April 2011]. BOE-A-2007-20635.
- Decreto 1/2015, de 30 de marzo, del Presidente de la Junta de Castilla y León, por el que se convocan elecciones a las Cortes de Castilla y León (PDF) (Decree 1/2015). Official Gazette of Castile and León (in Spanish). 30 March 2015. BOCYL-D-31032015-1.
