= Santa María del Páramo =

Coordinates: 42°21′N 5°45′W

Santa María del Páramo, Spain
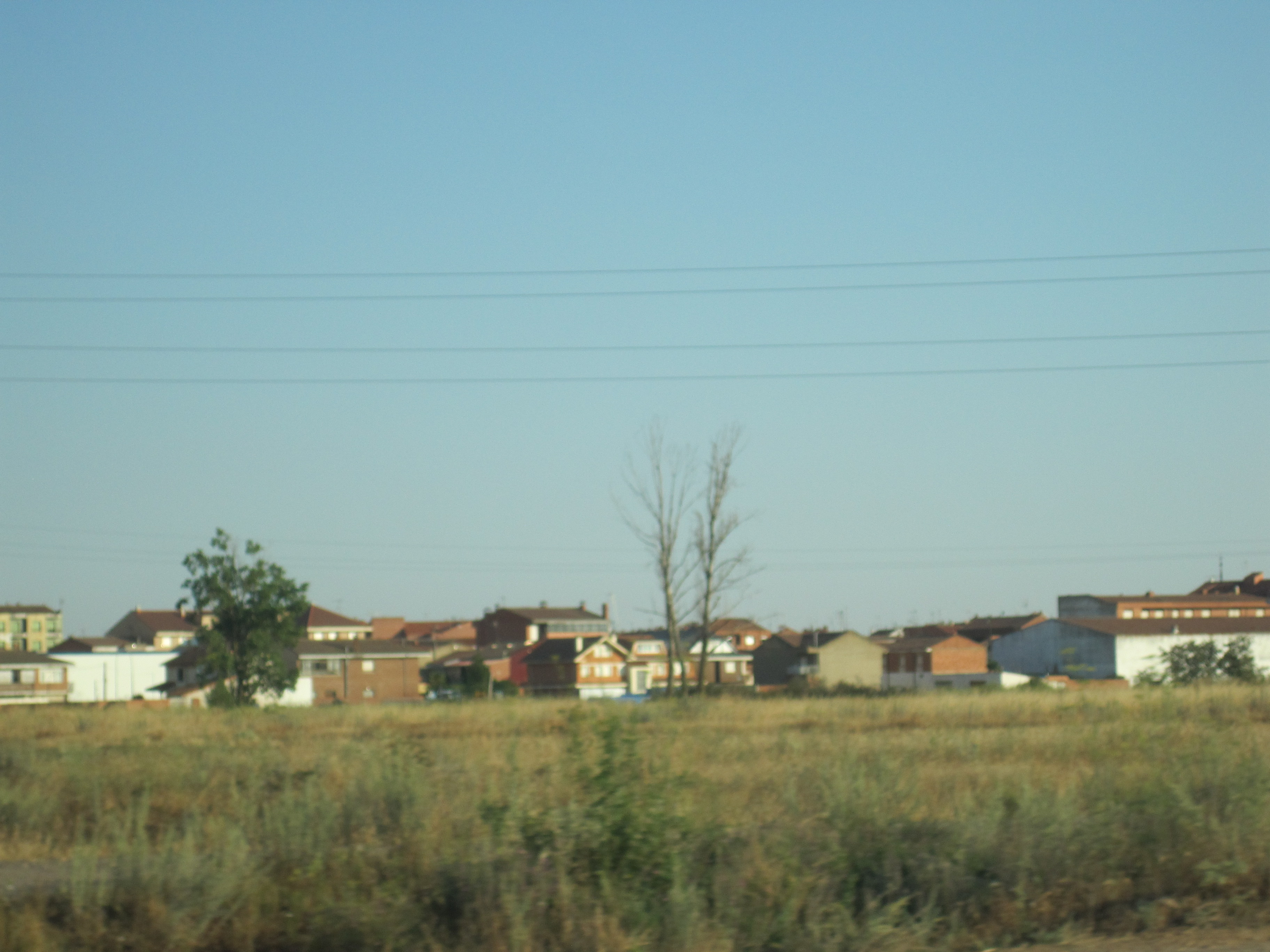

- Flag Coat of arms
- Interactive map of Santa María del Páramo, Spain
- Country: Spain
- Autonomous community: Castile and León
- Province: León
- Municipality: Santa María del Páramo

Government
  - Mayor: Alicia Gallego

Area
  - Total: 20.08 km^{2} (7.75 sq mi)
- Elevation: 813 m (2,667 ft)

Population (2025-01-01)
  - Total: 2,994
  - Density: 149.1/km^{2} (386.2/sq mi)
- Time zone: UTC+1 (CET)
  - Summer (DST): UTC+2 (CEST)

Santa María del Páramo is a municipality located in the province of León, Castile and León, Spain. According to the 2010 census (INE), the municipality has a population of 3.179 inhabitants.
