= Luis Mariano Santos =

Spanish politician

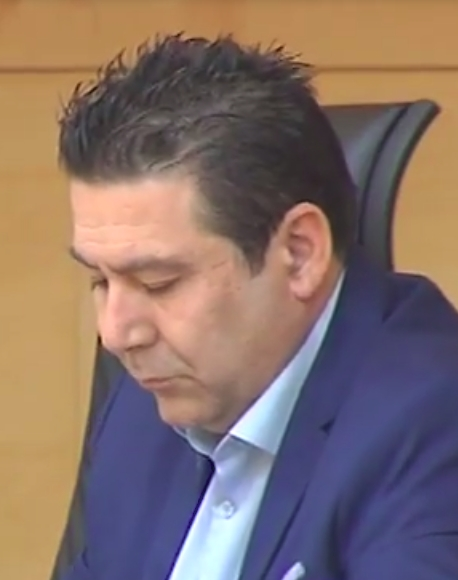

Luis Mariano Santos Reyero (born 1969) is a Spanish politician of the Leonese People's Union. He was the party's secretary general from 2017 to 2025. He was its sole representative elected to the Cortes of Castile and León in 2015 and 2019, and one of three elected in 2022. In 2023, he was elected mayor of his hometown of Cistierna.

== Biography ==
Born in Cistierna, Province of León, he graduated in political sciences from the Complutense University of Madrid and has a Master's degree in human resources. He was elected as a councillor in his hometown in 2003.

In March 2015, Santos was chosen as his party's list leader for the Castilian-Leonese regional election in May, having previously been number 2 to Alejandro Valderas. He was his party's only elected representative. At the party's 12th Congress, in November 2017, he became secretary general and vowed to return the party to its 1990s heyday.

In 2019, Santos was again the only UPL member elected to the Cortes. In the 2022 election, the party rose to three deputies, matching 1999 as its best result. Allying with Ángel Ceña, the leader of the three deputies elected by fellow regionalist party Soria ¡Ya!, the four formed a parliamentary group with Santos as spokesperson; they said that if Ceña was barred by parliamentary protocol from asking questions as a deputy spokesperson, the role would alternate every month.

While he and his party support León being a separate autonomous community to Castile, Santos has rejected accusations from the People's Party and Citizens that he supports full independence: "we are pro-constitution, Spanish and Leonese". The UPL's prospective region comprises the provinces of León, Zamora and Salamanca.

In the 2023 Spanish local elections, the UPL won the majority of seats in Cistierna's town council, and Santos became mayor. He said that it "closed a cycle" he had begun in 1995.

On 14 June 2025, at the UPL's congress, Santos ceded his position as secretary general to Alicia Gallego. He said that the party was unique in never being involved in corruption, and that it would likely win the next Castilian-Leonese regional election within the León constituency.
