= Villaturiel =

Coordinates: 42°31′N 5°29′W

- municipality
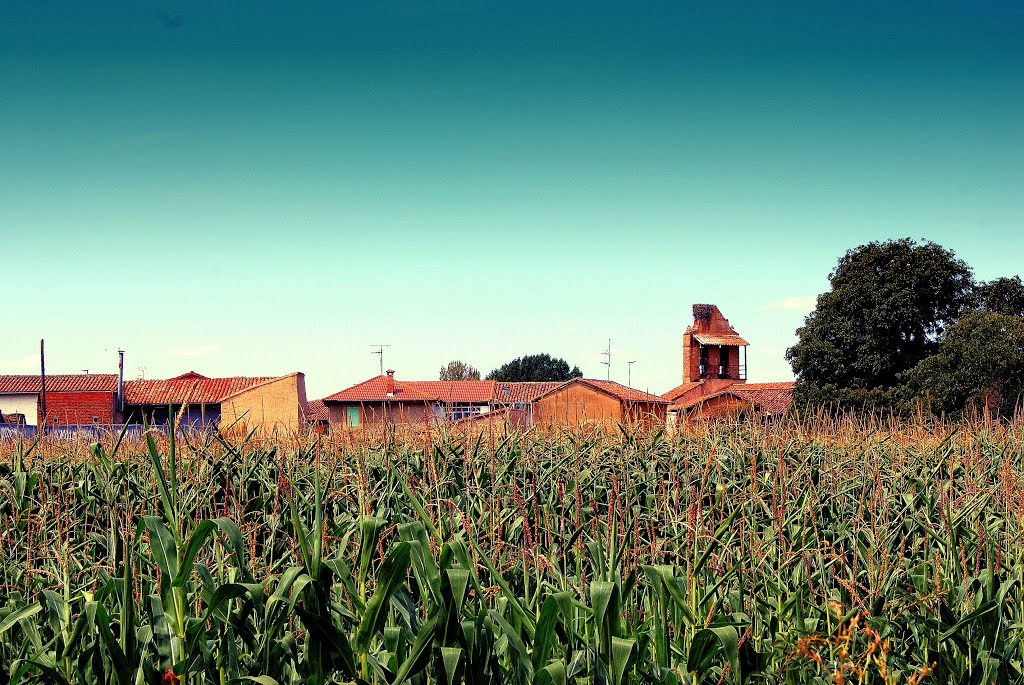
- Roderos, locality of Villaturiel

- Flag Coat of arms
- Interactive map of Villaturiel
- Country: Spain
- Autonomous community: Castile and León
- Province: León
- Municipality: Villaturiel

Area
  - Total: 57.06 km^{2} (22.03 sq mi)
- Elevation: 795 m (2,608 ft)

Population (2025-01-01)
  - Total: 1,812
  - Density: 31.76/km^{2} (82.25/sq mi)
- Time zone: UTC+1 (CET)
  - Summer (DST): UTC+2 (CEST)

Villaturiel (Spanish pronunciation: [biʎatuˈɾjel]) is a municipality located in the province of León, Castile and León, Spain. According to the 2004 census (INE), the municipality had a population of 1,767 inhabitants.
