= Provincia de El Bierzo =

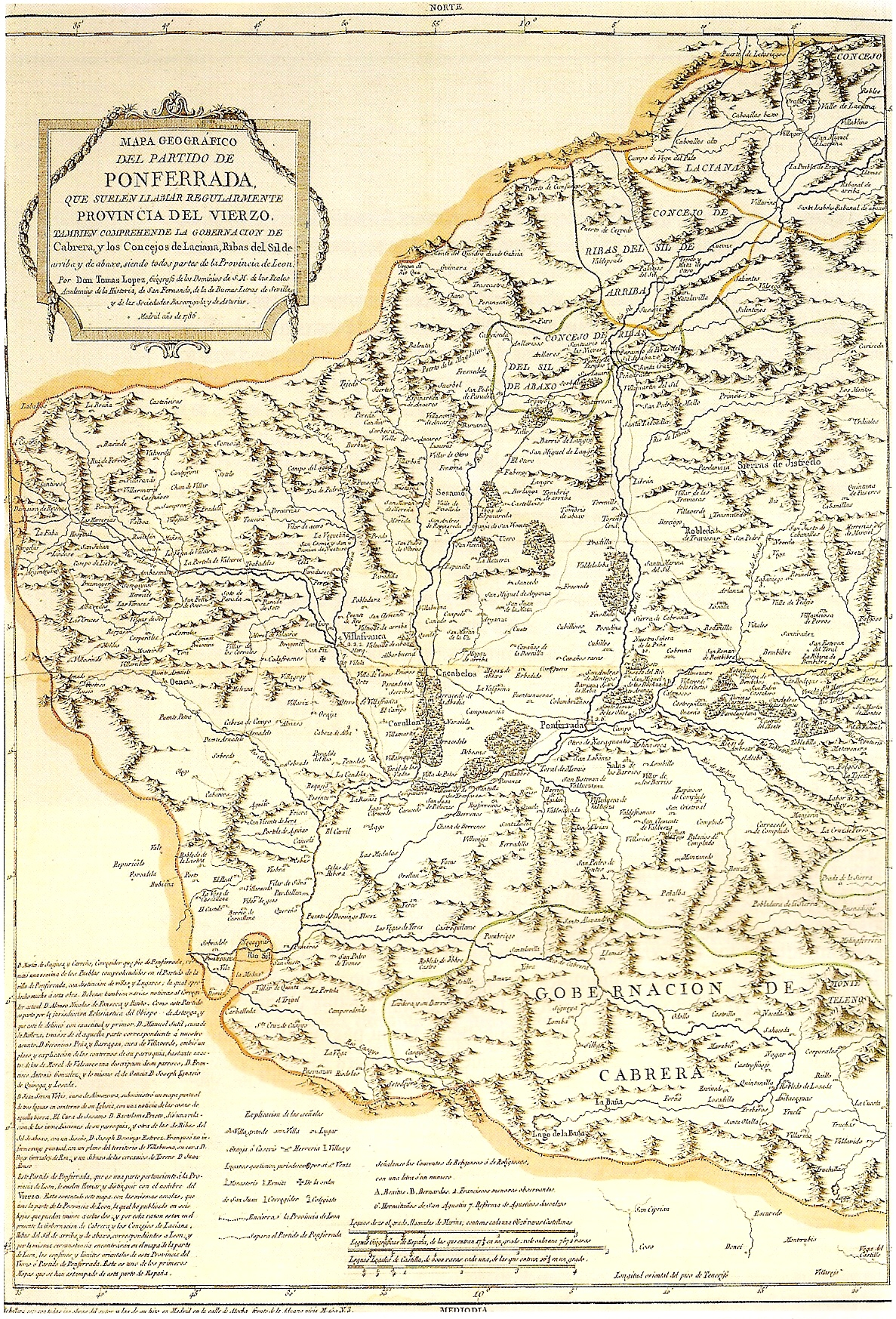
Map of the Province of Tomás's Lopez Vierzo (1786)

The Provincia de El Bierzo (Province of The Bierzo or Province of El Bierzo) is a proposed new province of Spain advocated for by some people and some political groups of the region of El Bierzo. The region is located in the westernmost part of the Province of León and occupies one-third of that province.

The inhabitants of this region have a marked personality and idiosyncrasy favored by the geographical situation of El Bierzo, a tectonic pit consisting of several valleys of different size, each separated from similar neighboring regions by a series of mountainous mountain ranges that surround it.

These groups and persons want to restore the Provincia del Vierzo, which disappeared in the 1833 territorial division of Spain. The comarca of El Bierzo is the only one in Castile and León recognized by that region's Statute of Autonomy, and it has its own regional legislature, the Consejo Comarcal de el Bierzo (Regional Council of El Bierzo). Advocates of a Province of El Bierzo wish also to annex the territories of Valdeorras (currently in the Province of Ourense), plus (from within the province of León) Laciana and the part of La Cabrera that formed a part of the extinct province but is not in the ambit of the present regional council

According to a 2006 survey on this topic, more than 53 percent of Bercianos would support the restoration of the province.
