= Pablo Fernández Santos =

Spanish politician

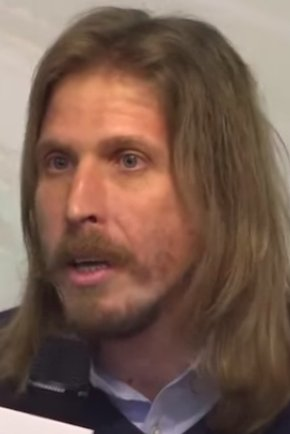

Secretary-General of Podemos Castile and León
- Incumbent
- Assumed office 14 February 2015
- Preceded by: Position established

Procurator in the Cortes of Castile and León
- In office 16 June 2015 – 24 April 2026
- Constituency: León

Personal details
- Born: 4 June 1976 (age 50) León, Spain
- Party: Podemos
- Education: Law
- Alma mater: Complutense University of Madrid
- Occupation: Self-employed kiosk owner, politician

Pablo Fernández Santos (born 4 June 1976) is a Spanish politician, former procurator in the Cortes of Castile and León and member of Podemos.

== Biography ==
Born in León, Pablo Fernández graduated in Law from the Complutense University of Madrid. He has been self-employed, running a press kiosk in his hometown.

In 2014 he began his activism in Podemos, being elected representative to the Citizen Council of the party. In February 2015, he was elected as Secretary-General of Podemos in Castile and León by the party's bases, likewise being designated in April as presidential candidate of the Junta of Castile and León and obtaining in the regional elections of May representation of all provinces, except for Soria, in the Cortes of Castile and León.

In May 2017, he was reelected Secretary-General of Podemos-Castile and León.
