= Podemos Castile and León =

Political party branch

Podemos Castile and León Podemos Castilla y León
- Secretary-General: Pablo Fernández Santos
- Founded: 2014; 11 years ago
- Headquarters: C/ Padre Claret, 7, 47004 Valladolid
- Ideology: Democratic socialism Republicanism; Laicism; Federalism; Feminism
- Political position: Left-wing
- National affiliation: Podemos
- Cortes of Castile and León: 2 / 81

Website
- castillayleon.podemos.info

Podemos Castile and León (Spanish: Podemos Castilla y León) is the Castilian-Leonese federation of the Spanish political party Podemos. The Secretary General is Pablo Fernández Santos.

== Electoral performance ==
=== Cortes of Castile and León ===
Cortes of Castile and León
Election	Votes	%	#	Seats	+/–	Leading candidate	Status in legislature
2015	165,475	12.14%	3rd	10 / 84	-	Pablo Fernández Santos	Opposition
2019	67,918	5.00%	4th	2 / 81	8	Pablo Fernández Santos	Opposition
