= Carlos García Carbayo =

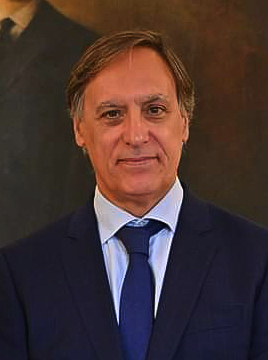

Carlos Manuel García Carbayo (born 1 November 1962) is a Spanish politician of the People's Party (PP). He was elected to the city council in Salamanca and has served as mayor since 2018.

== Biography ==
Born in Salamanca, García Carbayo graduated with a law degree from the University of Salamanca in 1984. He also qualified as a secondary school teacher specialising in vocational training, and as an administrative manager. He taught at secondary schools in Zamora and Segovia, as well as working as a civil servant for the Regional Government of Castile and León. From 2007 to 2011, he worked alongside Alfonso Fernández Mañueco, who was Minister of the Interior and Justice.

García Carbayo was first elected to the city council of Salamanca in 2011, as the People's Party (PP) governed under Mañueco, and four years later he was named as deputy mayor. He was also tasked with the areas of urban planning and traffic.

On 20 December 2018, García Carbayo was invested as mayor as Mañueco resigned to concentrate on his candidacy in the 2019 Castilian-Leonese regional election; García Carbayo received the votes of his party as the three other parties voted for their own candidate. It was confirmed the following day by Javier Iglesias, president of the PP in the Province of Salamanca, that García Carbayo would be the PP's mayoral candidate in the May 2019 election.

In June 2019, García Carbayo was re-elected as mayor with the votes of the 11 PP councillors and the four from Citizens (Cs). In March 2023, he succeeded Iglesias as provincial president of the PP, with 1,309 votes compared to 499 for Santa Marta de Tormes councillor Chabela de la Torre. In the next local election two months later, he won an absolute majority of 14 seats out of 27 as Cs disappeared.
