= Carlos Martínez Mínguez =

Spanish politician

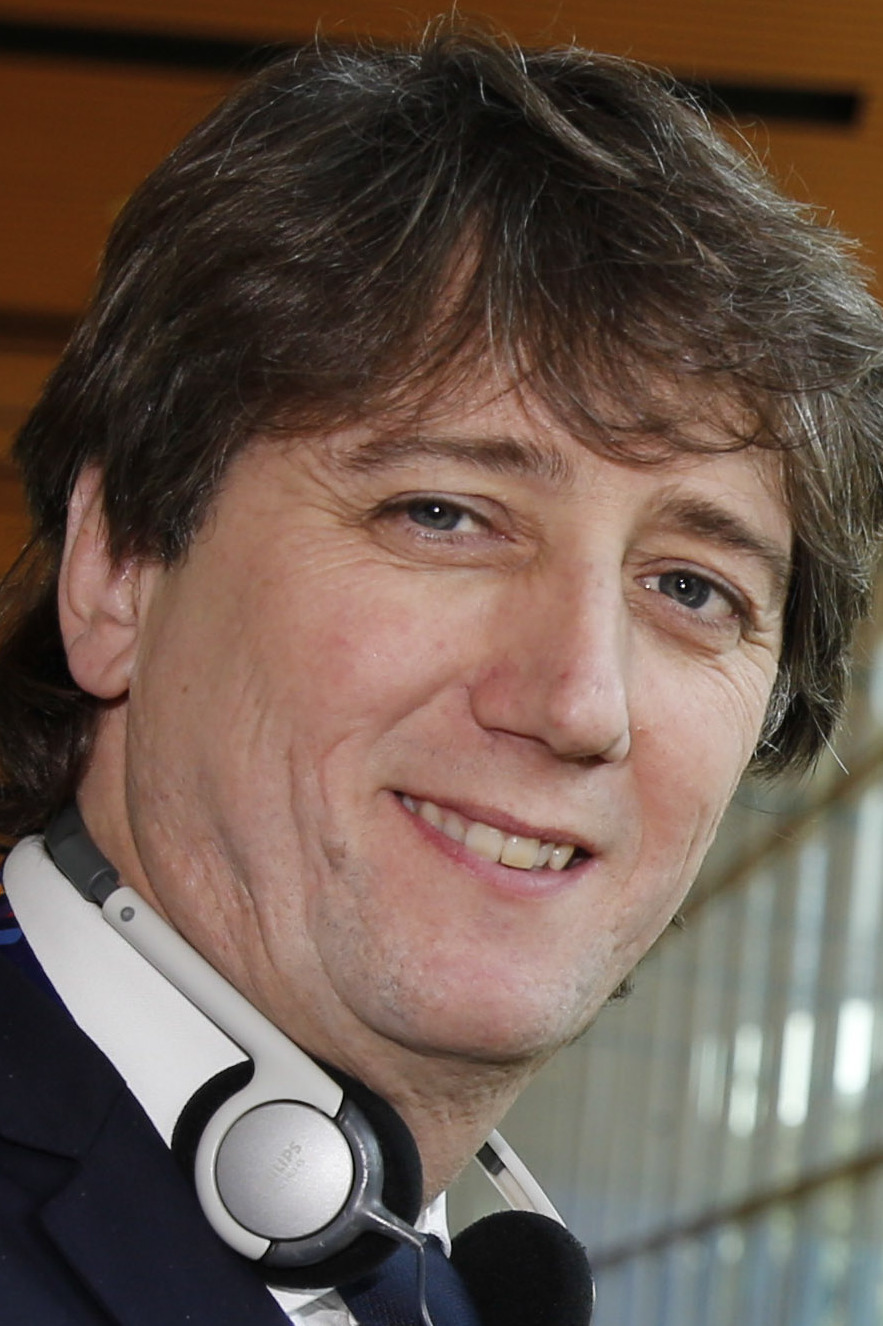

Secretary-General of the Socialist Party of Castile and León
- Incumbent
- Assumed office 22 February 2025
- Preceded by: Luis Tudanca

Mayor of Soria
- In office 16 June 2007 – 13 April 2026
- Preceded by: Encarnación Redondo
- Succeeded by: Javier Antón Cacho

Member of the Cortes of Castile and León
- Incumbent
- Assumed office 14 April 2026
- Constituency: Soria
- In office 17 June 2003 – 19 June 2007
- Constituency: Soria

Personal details
- Born: 28 June 1973 (age 53) Soria, Castile and León, Spain
- Party: PSOE

Carlos Martínez Mínguez (born 28 June 1973) is a politician of the Spanish Socialist Workers' Party (PSOE). He was elected to the city council in Soria in 1999 and was the mayor from 2007 to 2026. He was a member of the Cortes of Castile and León from 2003 to 2007. In 2025, he was elected secretary general of the Socialist Party of Castile and León, and led the party to second place in the 2026 regional election.

== Biography ==
Born in Soria in Castile and León, Martínez was elected onto his hometown's council in 1999, serving in the administration of mayor Eloísa Álvarez in a coalition government of their Spanish Socialist Workers' Party (PSOE) and two other parties. In 2003, the People's Party (PP) won the mayor's office, and Martínez led the opposition; he was simultaneously a member of the Cortes of Castile and León.

In 2007, 34-year-old Martínez became the youngest mayor of a provincial capital of Castile and León. Having led a minority government in his first term, he won an absolute majority of seats on the council in 2011, retaining it in three further elections despite the emergence of third parties such as Podemos and Citizens in the 2015 elections.

In 2012, Martínez was a spokesperson for Carme Chacón's unsuccessful campaign for the position of secretary generalat the PSOE federal congress. Five years later, he backed Susana Díaz's campaign for the same position; it went to Pedro Sánchez.

Luis Tudanca resigned as leader of the Socialist Party of Castile and León in January 2025 and Martínez succeeded him. He was the only candidate, and new PSOE statutes meant that an unopposed candidate did not need a threshold of signatures or to contest a primary election.

In the 2026 Castilian-Leonese regional election, Martínez led the PSOE to second place behind the incumbent PP, with both parties adding two deputies compared to 2022. With Vox growing by one, the parties of the right retained a majority.

On 13 April 2026, Martínez resigned as mayor of Soria the day before being sworn into the Cortes of Castile and León. Having governed for 19 years, he was the longest-serving Socialist mayor of a provincial capital.
