= Ángel Ceña =

Spanish politician

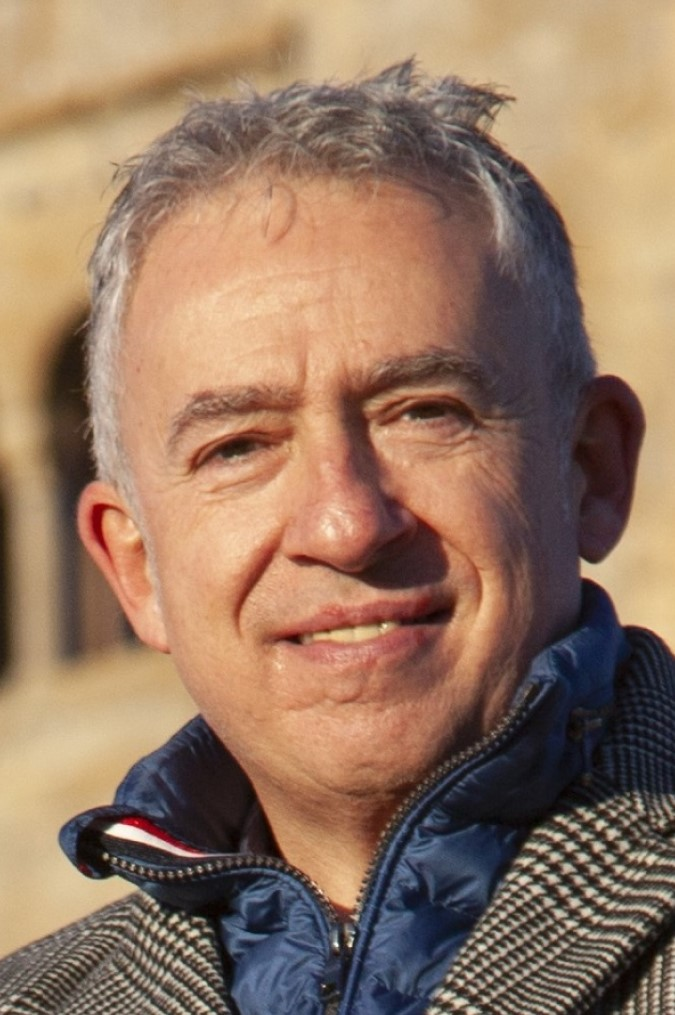

Ángel Ceña Tutor (born 24 October 1967) is a Spanish civil servant and politician. As the lead candidate for the party Soria ¡Ya! (SY) within the coalition Empty Spain (EV), he was elected to the Cortes of Castile and León in the 2022 and 2026 elections.

== Biography ==
Born in Soria, Castile and León, Ceña is a fan of his hometown football club CD Numancia, and Atlético Madrid. Hegraduated in law and history from the University of Valladolid, then became a civil servant, obtaining the role of chief transport inspector. In 2019, he took part in a protest in Madrid to raise awareness of the depopulating rural areas known as "Empty Spain".

When regional president Alfonso Fernández Mañueco called a snap election for February 2022. In January, he was chosen to lead the campaign for Soria ¡Ya! (SY), a regionalist party within the Empty Spain (EV) platform. The party was the most voted for in the province with 42.6% of the votes, taking three of the five seats.

The three deputies from Soria ¡Ya! formed a parliamentary group with the three from fellow regionalist party the Leonese People's Union (UPL), with the latter's leader Luis Mariano Santos as spokesperson. They said that if Ceña was barred by parliamentary protocol from asking questions as a deputy spokesperson, the role would alternate every month.

In the 2026 Castilian-Leonese regional election, Soria ¡Ya! fell from three deputies to just Ceña.
