= 2026 Castilian-Leonese regional election =

Election in the Spanish region of Castile and León

- 15 March 2026

All 82 seats in the Cortes of Castile and León 42 seats needed for a majority
- Opinion polls
- Registered: 2,097,803 ▲0.2%
- Turnout: 1,271,896 (60.6%) ▲1.8 pp
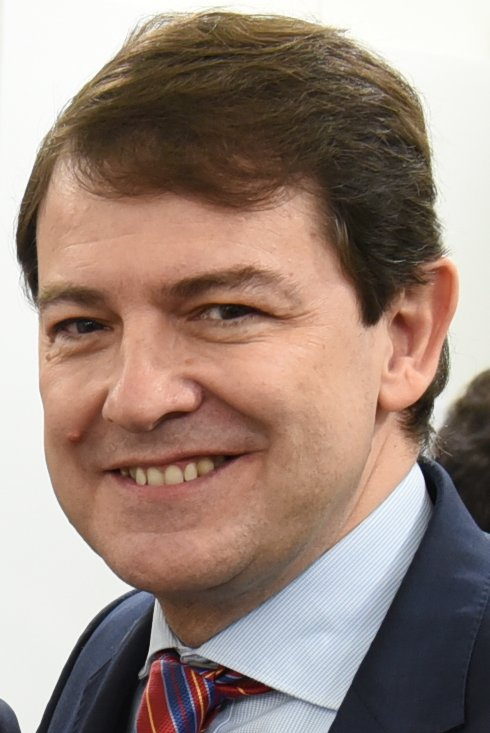

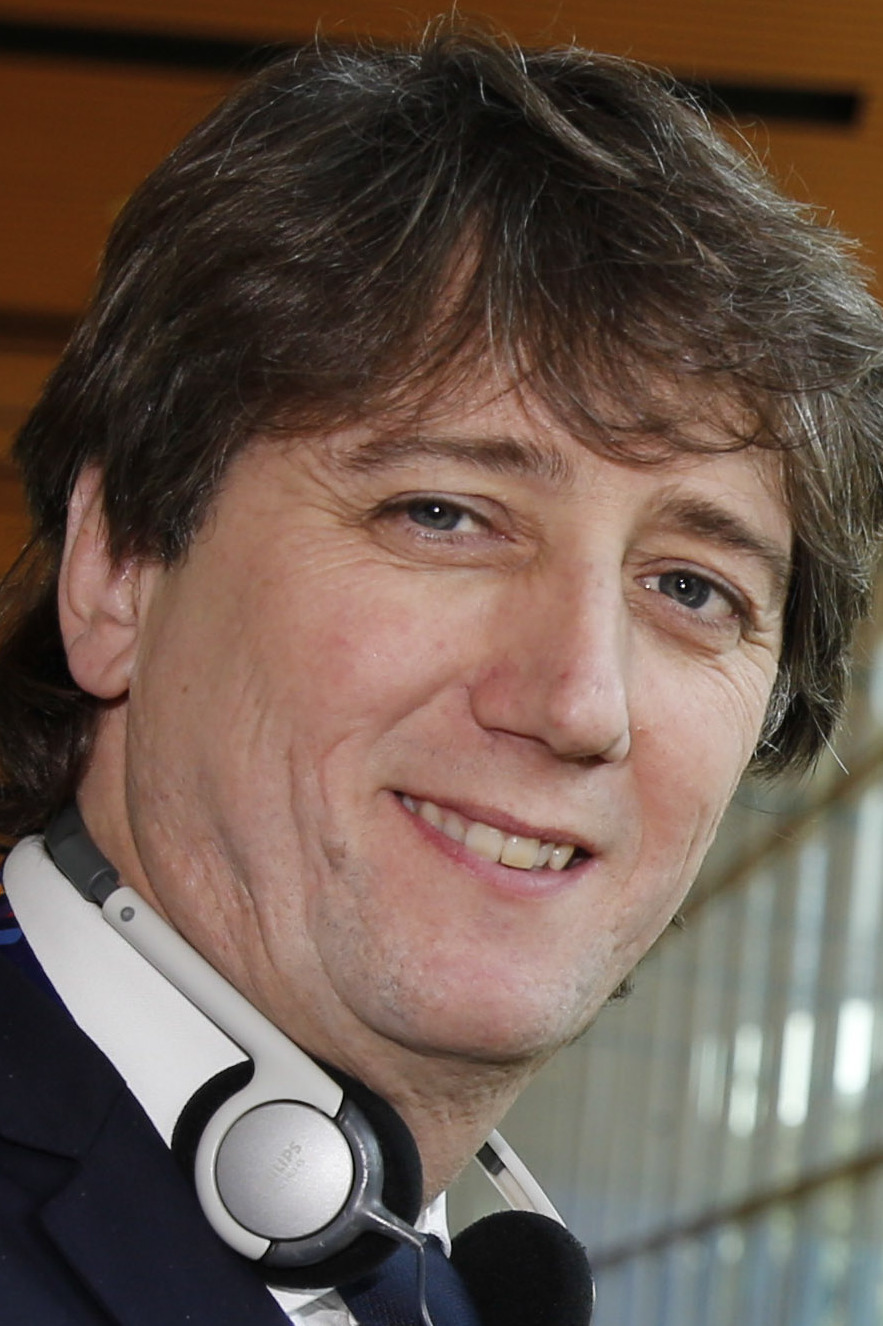

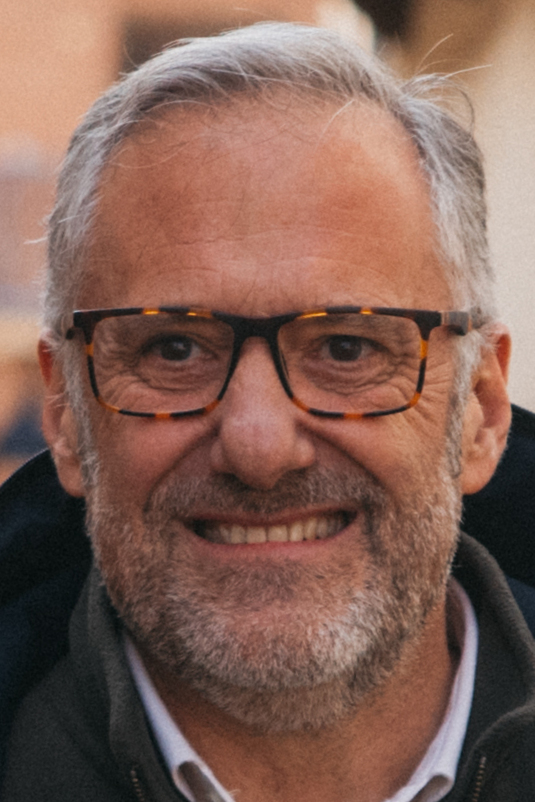

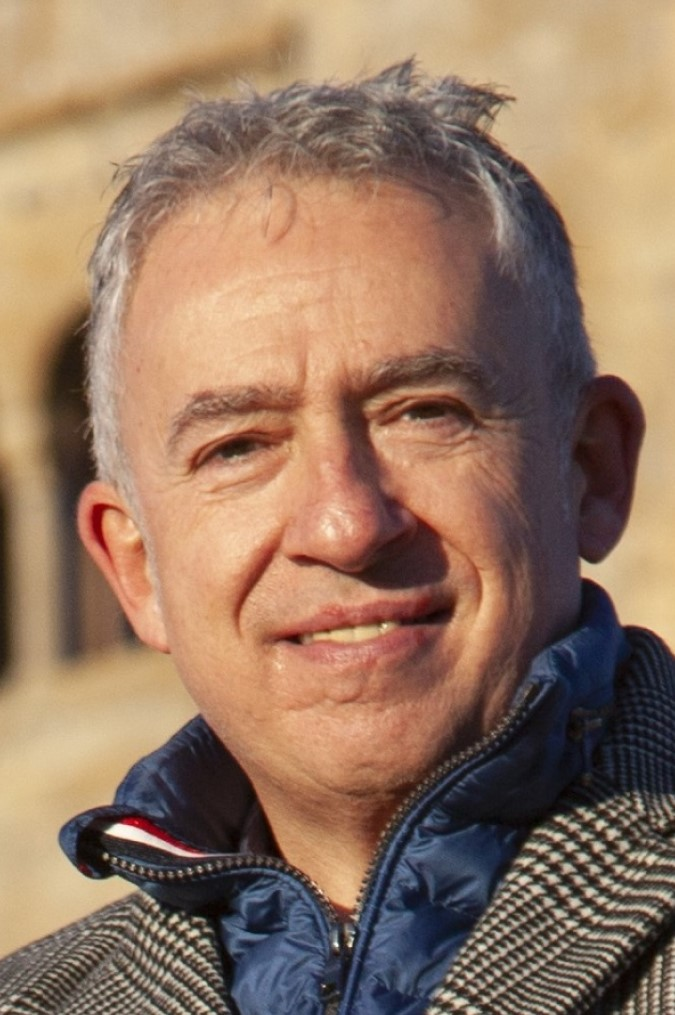
	First party	Second party	Third party
Leader	Alfonso Fernández Mañueco	Carlos Martínez	Carlos Pollán
Party	PP	PSOE	Vox
Leader since	1 April 2017	9 January 2025	9 February 2026
Leader's seat	Salamanca	Soria	León
Last election	31 seats, 31.4%	28 seats, 30.0%	13 seats, 17.6%
Seats won	33	30	14
Seat change	▲2	▲2	▲1
Popular vote	444,296	386,774	237,100
Percentage	35.4%	30.8%	18.9%
Swing	▲4.0 pp	▲0.8 pp	▲1.3 pp
	Fourth party	Fifth party	Sixth party
Leader	Alicia Gallego	Pedro Pascual	Ángel Ceña
Party	UPL	XAV	SY
Leader since	14 June 2025	9 April 2019	10 January 2022
Leader's seat	León	Ávila	Soria
Last election	3 seats, 4.3%	1 seat, 1.1%	3 seats, 1.6% (Note: Within the EV–SY alliance in the 2022 election.)
Seats won	3	1	1
Seat change	0	0	▼2
Popular vote	54,096	11,518	9,145
Percentage	4.3%	0.9%	0.7%
Swing	0.0 pp	▼0.2 pp	▼0.9 pp
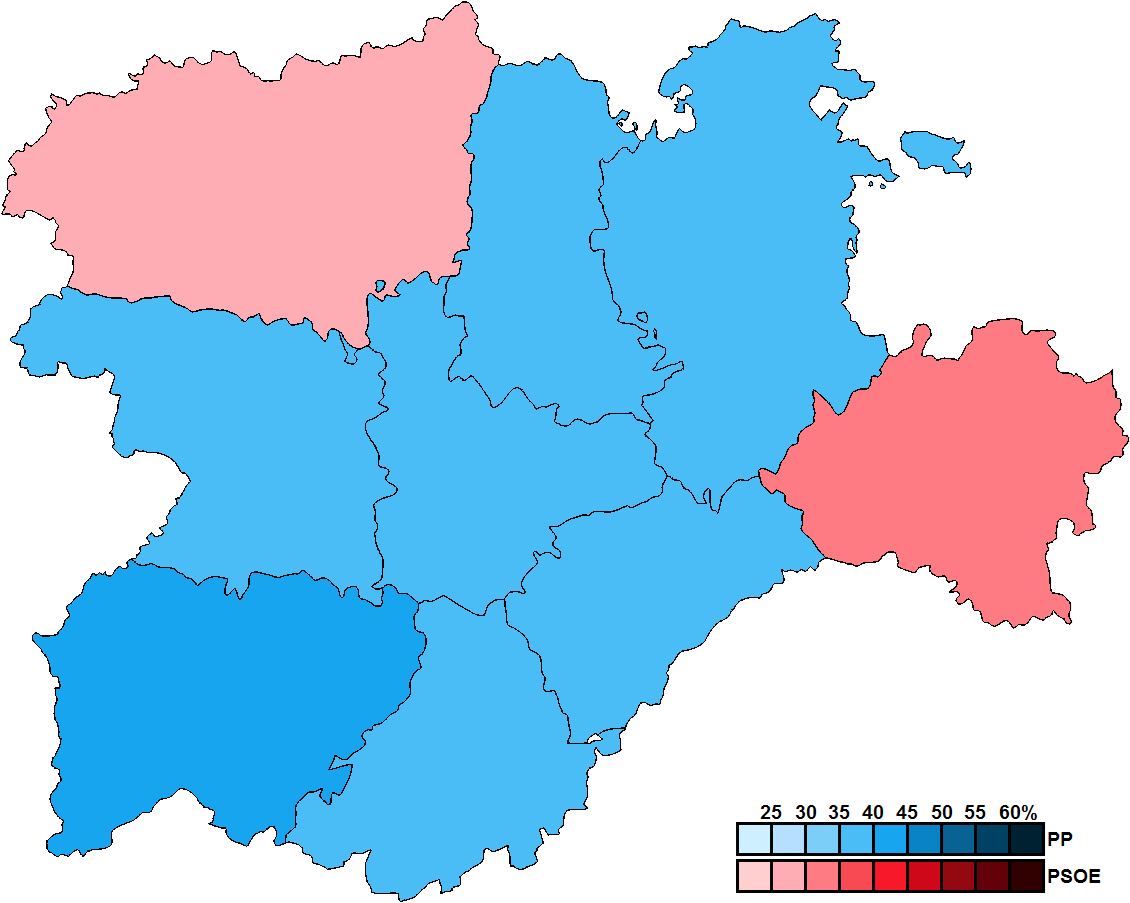
President before election
Alfonso Fernández Mañueco
PP
President after election
Alfonso Fernández Mañueco
PP

A regional election was held in Castile and León on 15 March 2026 to elect the 12th Cortes of the autonomous community. All 82 seats in the Cortes were up for election.

In the aftermath of the previous election held in 2022, the People's Party (PP) under Alfonso Fernández Mañueco reached a coalition agreement with the far-right Vox party, the first up until that point, and which would be mirrored in other regions and city councils following the 2023 local and regional elections. All PP–Vox regional coalitions collapsed in July 2024 over a strategic movement from the latter's national leadership, with Mañueco leading a minority government from that point onwards. The leader of the opposition Spanish Socialist Workers' Party (PSOE), Luis Tudanca, was replaced in his post by Soria mayor Carlos Martínez in January 2025, while Vox's regional leader and former regional vice president, Juan García-Gallardo, resigned from his posts in February 2025, citing disagreements with the party's national leadership.

Population decline and ageing and the regional government's management of the August 2025 Spanish wildfires were seen as key themes going into the election, as well as the PP's uninterrupted 39-year period in power in the region. Also featuring in the campaign was the onset of the 2026 Iran war, which saw the prime minister of Spain, Pedro Sánchez, champion a "no to war" position centered around de-escalation, respect for international law and a rejection of the United States's use of joint military bases at Rota and Morón to carry out attacks on Iran; this led to a direct clash with U.S. President Donald Trump, with the latter threatening to sever Spain–U.S. trade relations. The campaign ended with PP and Vox openly clashing over the right-wing vote, with the latter refusing to cast itself as a junior partner to a prospective PP government while suffering from a series of internal purges of high-profile members.

The election resulted in a new victory for Mañueco's PP, which fell short of an overall majority to govern alone and remained dependant on Vox's support. Conversely, the PSOE under Martínez saw an unexpected growth in votes and seats—reversing a negative trend that saw it collect adverse outcomes in Extremadura and Aragon—a result which was attributed to Martínez's profile and a last-hour mobilization of left-wing voters due to the party's anti-war stance. Vox made modest gains, but underperformed expectations of overcoming 20 percent of the vote, which media attributed to the party's internal conflicts, its stance to block government negotiations in Extremadura and Aragon, and its explicit support for Trump's actions in the Middle East. Parties to the left of the PSOE, United Left and Podemos, fell below expectations and failed to secure the single seat elected under the Unidas Podemos alliance in the 2022 election, whereas the liberal Citizens was left out of parliament.

== Background ==
As a result of the 2022 regional election, the People's Party (PP) under Alfonso Fernández Mañueco formed a coalition government with the far-right Vox party under Juan García-Gallardo, the first of its kind at regional level in Spain.

In January 2023 as part of their coalition agreement including pro-natalist initiatives to combat the region's population decline and ageing, the regional government announced a plan that required health professionals to offer pregnant women seeking abortion the opportunity to listen to the fetal heartbeat, 4D ultrasound scans, and psychological counseling. The political backlash—which saw the Spanish government under Prime Minister Pedro Sánchez threatening to appeal the issue to the Constitutional Court of Spain—forced Mañueco to partially drop the plan and announce that its measures would not be actively offered by doctors, but rather made available to women upon request. Despite risking breaking up the coalition over the issue, the PP rejected subsequent Vox attempts to revive this anti-abortion plan, regarding them as controversial.

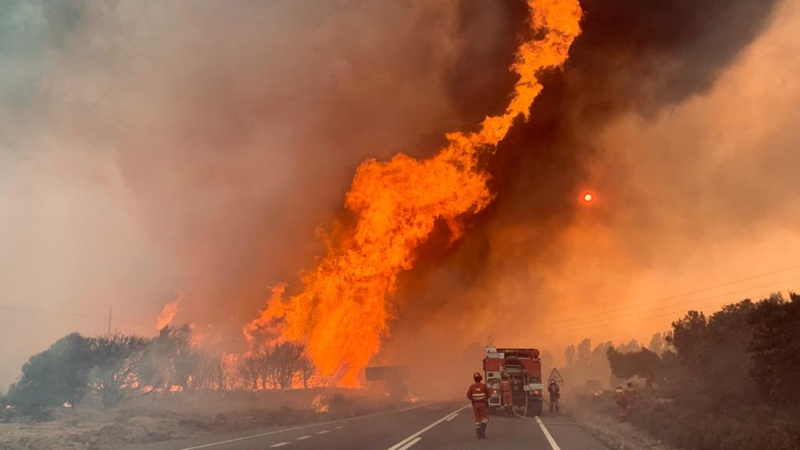
Alfonso Fernández Mañueco's administration was criticized for its management of the 2022 and 2025 wildfires.

The PP–Vox coalition was terminated in July 2024 when Vox's national leader, Santiago Abascal, forced the break up of all their regional governments over a controversy regarding the nationwide distribution of unaccompanied migrant minors among the autonomous communities. Culture minister Gonzalo Santonja refused to quit the government and left Vox, whereas the industry and agriculture ministers, Mariano Veganzones and Gerardo Dueñas respectively, were removed despite having voiced their will to stay on. In February 2025, García-Gallardo resigned from his posts, citing disagreements with Vox's national leadership.

The regional government came under criticism for the delay in the activation and deployment of firefighting teams during the summer 2022 wildfires, which saw over 60,000 hectare burning in the Sierra de la Culebra. Then during the August 2025 Spanish wildfires, which affected the provinces of León (particularly the Las Médulas historic gold-mining site) and Zamora the most, the regional PP administration was again criticized over the deficiency of fire prevention systems, the paralysis of fire control resources and a slow response capacity, as well as for crisis management that saw it attempting to deflect the blame on the national government under Prime Minister Sánchez (despite both forest and fire management being a regional responsibility).

The opposition Spanish Socialist Workers' Party (PSOE) saw a leadership change in January 2025, when long-standing leader Luis Tudanca was replaced by Soria mayor since 2007, Carlos Martínez. Tudanca's growing divergences with the national PSOE (which saw his resistance to the modification of the regional candidate lists ahead of the 2023 general election, as well as his critical position on the regional financing policy of Sánchez's government), ultimately led to an open clash with the national party leadership in the autumn of 2024, as Tudanca sought to call regional primaries ahead of the federal party congress to secure himself in the post. The national party cancelled the primaries regarding them as anti-statutory, prompting Tudanca to renounce standing for re-election.

== Overview ==
Under the 2007 Statute of Autonomy, the Cortes of Castile and León was the unicameral legislature of the homonymous autonomous community, having legislative power in devolved matters, as well as the ability to grant or withdraw confidence from a regional president. The electoral and procedural rules were supplemented by national law provisions.

=== Date ===
The term of the Cortes of Castile and León expired four years after the date of its previous election, unless it was dissolved earlier. The election decree was required to be issued no later than 25 days before the scheduled expiration date of parliament and published on the following day in the Official Gazette of Castile and León (BOCYL), with election day taking place 54 days after the decree's publication. The previous election was held on 13 February 2022, which meant that the chamber's term would have expired on 13 February 2026. The election decree was required to be published in the BOCYL no later than 20 January 2026, setting the latest possible date for election day on 15 March 2026.

The regional president had the prerogative to dissolve the Cortes of Castile and León at any given time and call a snap election, provided that no motion of no confidence was in process and that dissolution did not occur either during the first legislative session or before one year after a previous one. In the event of an investiture process failing to elect a regional president within a two-month period from the first ballot, the Cortes were to be automatically dissolved and a fresh election called.

In January 2023, it was commented that President Mañueco could try to reset the electoral cycle to make it coincide with the 2023 Spanish local elections on 28 May that year, this was ruled out by Mañueco himself. Further speculation surfaced with the advancement of the 2023 Spanish general election to 23 July, but the regional government ultimately rejected it. In late 2024, it emerged that Mañueco was considering to call a snap election in the event of being unable to get his 2025 budget passed through parliament—following Vox's decision to exit the cabinet earlier that year—but this was again rejected in December 2024, as well as another round of speculation following a party crisis in Vox that saw the resignation of García-Gallardo as regional leader in February 2025. On 16 September 2025, the regional government confirmed that the election would most likely be held on 15 March 2026—the latest possible date in which it could legally be held—except in the event of a snap general election being called earlier, in which case both would be held concurrently. After the confirmation on 27 October 2025 of a snap regional election in Extremadura for 21 December, Mañueco ruled out a concurrent electoral call and insisted that his plan was still to hold the Castilian-Leonese election in March 2026. 15 March was confirmed as the election date on 14 January 2026, a few days before the scheduled dissolution of parliament.

The Cortes of Castile and León was officially dissolved on 20 January 2026 with the publication of the corresponding decree in the BOCYL, setting election day for 15 March and scheduling for the chamber to reconvene on 14 April.

=== Electoral system ===
Voting for the Cortes was based on universal suffrage, comprising all Spanish nationals over 18 years of age, registered in Castile and León and with full political rights, provided that they had not been deprived of the right to vote by a final sentence. Amendments in 2022 abolished the "begged" voting system (Spanish: Voto rogado), under which non-resident citizens were required to apply for voting. The begged vote system was attributed responsibility for a major decrease in the turnout of Spaniards abroad during the years it was in force.

The Cortes of Castile and León had three seats per each multi-member constituency—corresponding to the provinces of Ávila, Burgos, León, Palencia, Salamanca, Segovia, Soria, Valladolid and Zamora—plus one additional seat per 45,000 inhabitants or fraction above 22,500. All were elected using the D'Hondt method and closed-list proportional voting, with a three percent-threshold of valid votes (including blank ballots) in each constituency. The use of this electoral method resulted in a higher effective threshold depending on district magnitude and vote distribution.

As a result of the aforementioned allocation, each Cortes constituency was entitled the following seats:

Seats	Constituencies
15	Valladolid
13	León
11	Burgos
10	Salamanca
7	Ávila, Palencia, Segovia^{(+1)}, Zamora
5	Soria

The law did not provide for by-elections to fill vacant seats; instead, any vacancies arising after the proclamation of candidates and during the legislative term were filled by the next candidates on the party lists or, when required, by designated substitutes.

=== Outgoing parliament ===
The table below shows the composition of the parliamentary groups in the chamber at the time of dissolution.

Parliamentary composition in January 2026
Groups	Parties	Legislators	
Groups	Parties	Seats	Total
People's Parliamentary Group	PP	31	31
Socialist Parliamentary Group	PSOE	28	28
Vox Castile and León Parliamentary Group	Vox	11	11
Leonese People's Union– Soria Now! Group	UPL	3	6
Leonese People's Union– Soria Now! Group	SY	3	6
Mixed Group	Podemos	1	3
Mixed Group	XAV	1	3
Mixed Group	IzqEsp	1 (Note: Francisco Igea, former CS legislator.)	3
Non-Inscrits	INDEP	2 (Note: Ana Rosa Hernando and Javier Teira, former Vox legislators.)	2

== Parties and candidates ==
The electoral law allowed for parties and federations registered in the interior ministry, alliances and groupings of electors to present lists of candidates. Parties and federations intending to form an alliance were required to inform the relevant electoral commission within 10 days of the election call, whereas groupings of electors needed to secure the signature of at least one percent of the electorate in the constituencies for which they sought election, disallowing electors from signing for more than one list. Amendments in 2024 required a balanced composition of men and women in the electoral lists through the use of a zipper system.

Below is a list of the main parties and alliances which will likely contest the election:

Candidacy	Parties and alliances	Leading candidate	Ideology	Previous result		Gov.	Ref.
Candidacy	Parties and alliances	Leading candidate	Ideology	Vote %	Seats	Gov.	Ref.
PP	List: People's Party (PP)	Alfonso Fernández Mañueco	Conservatism; Christian democracy	31.4%	31	Yes	
PSOE	List: Spanish Socialist Workers' Party (PSOE)	Carlos Martínez	Social democracy	30.0%	28	No	
Vox	List: Vox (Vox)	Carlos Pollán	Right-wing populism Ultranationalism; National conservatism	17.6%	13	No	
UPL	List: Leonese People's Union (UPL)	Alicia Gallego	Leonesism; Regionalism; Autonomism	4.3%	3	No	
SY	List: Soria Now! (SY)	Ángel Ceña	Localism; Ruralism	1.6%	3	No	
Podemos–AV	List: We Can (Podemos); Green Alliance (AV)	Miguel Ángel Llamas	Left-wing populism Democratic socialism	5.1% (Note: Within the Unidas Podemos alliance in the 2022 election: Podemos (1 seat) and IU (0 seats).)	1	No	
IU–MS–VQ	List: United Left of Castile and León (IUCyL) – Communist Party of Castile and León (PCCyL) – The Dawn Marxist Organization (La Aurora (OM)) – Republican Left (IR); Unite Movement (SMR); Greens Equo–Green Party (VQ–PV)	Juan Gascón	Socialism; Communism; Progressivism	5.1%	1	No	
Cs	List: Citizens–Party of the Citizenry (Cs)	None (Note: Cs did not field a single candidate for the post of president of the Regional Government of Castile and León nor did have a visible single leader of the candidacy, on the basis of it being a "collective project".)	Liberalism	4.5%	1	No	
XAV	List: For Ávila (XAV)	Pedro Pascual	Regionalism	1.1%	1	No	

== Campaign ==
=== Timetable ===
The key dates are listed below (all times are CET):

- 19 January: The election decree is issued with the countersign of the president, after deliberation in the Regional Government.
- 20 January: Formal dissolution of parliament and start of prohibition period on the inauguration of public works, services or projects.
- 23 January: Initial constitution of provincial and zone electoral commissions with judicial members.
- 26 January: Division of constituencies into polling sections and stations.
- 30 January: Deadline for parties and federations to report on their electoral alliances.
- 2 February: Deadline for electoral register consultation for the purpose of possible corrections.
- 9 February: Deadline for parties, federations, alliances, and groupings of electors to present electoral lists.
- 11 February: Publication of submitted electoral lists in the Official Gazette of Castile and León (BOCYL); deadline for parties, federations, alliances, and groupings of electors to communicate their presidential candidates for the purpose of electoral debates.
- 16 February: Official proclamation of validly submitted electoral lists.
- 17 February: Publication of proclaimed electoral lists in the BOCYL.
- 18 February: Deadline for the selection of polling station members by sortition.
- 26 February: Deadline for the appointment of non-judicial members to provincial and zone electoral commissions.
- 27 February: Official start of electoral campaigning.
- 5 March: Deadline to apply for postal voting.
- 10 March: Start of legal ban on electoral opinion polling publication; deadline for non-resident citizens (electors residing abroad (CERA) and citizens temporarily absent from Spain) to vote by mail.
- 11 March: Deadline for postal and temporarily absent voting.
- 12 March: Deadline for CERA voting.
- 13 March: Last day of electoral campaigning.
- 14 March: Official election silence ("reflection day").
- 15 March: Election day (polling stations open at 9 am and close at 8 pm or once voters present in a queue at/outside the polling station at 8 pm have cast their vote); provisional vote counting.
- 20 March: Start of general vote counting, including CERA votes.
- 23 March: Deadline for the general vote counting.
- 1 April: Deadline for the proclamation of elected members.
- 14 April: Deadline for the reconvening of parliament (date determined by the election decree, which for the 2026 election was set for 14 April).
- 11 May: Deadline for the publication of definitive election results in the BOCYL.

=== Party slogans ===
Party or alliance	Original slogan	English translation	Ref.
PP	« Aquí, certezas »	"Here, certainties"	
PSOE	« Cambiemos el futuro »	"Let's change the future"	
Vox	« Sentido común »	"Common sense"	
UPL	« Defiende lo tuyo »	"Defend what is yours"	
SY	« Por Soria, rebélate »	"For Soria, rebel!"	
Podemos–AV	« La fuerza de la valentía »	"The power of courage"	
IU–MS–VQ	« Defender lo común »	"Defend what is common"	
XAV	« Ávila merece más »	"Ávila deserves more"	

=== Events and issues ===
The outbreak of the 2026 Iran war saw Prime Minister Pedro Sánchez openly reject both the unilateral military action of the United States and Israel and the Islamic Revolutionary Guard Corps's attacks against other Middle East countries, calling for immediate de-escalation and respect for international law and denying the U.S. the use of joint military bases at Rota and Morón to carry out attacks on Iran. This resulted in a direct clash with President Donald Trump, who threatened Spain with severing trade relations and a possible embargo. Sánchez responded by doubling down on his "no to war" position, reminding how the unpopular Spanish intervention in the 2003 invasion of Iraq led to the 11M bombings, while the opposition PP and Vox initially aligned themselves with the U.S. and Israel intervention. With the war and Trump himself being broadly unpopular among Spanish voters, various media outlets drew comparisons with Canada in 2025 (over the United States–Canada trade war) and commented on whether Sánchez's stance—with him emerging internationally as the main EU critic to Trump's presidency—could trigger a rally 'round the flag effect at home. As a result, this issue featured during the election campaign.

=== Debates ===
The electoral law of Castile and León provided for the presidential candidates of the parties having a parliamentary group in the Cortes to participate in, at least, two leaders' debates to be held during the electoral campaign. The debates were scheduled to be held on 3 March in RTVE (then moved to 5 March to prevent it from conflicting with the 2025–26 Copa del Rey semi-finals) and 10 March in RTVCyL, with the candidates of the three main parliamentary groups: PP, PSOE and Vox. UPL and SY appealed the decision to exclude them from the debates (despite having a parliamentary group of their own) to the Central Electoral Commission.

2026 Castilian-Leonese regional election debates
Date	Organizer(s)	Moderator(s)	P Present (Note: Denotes a main invitee attending the event.) S Surrogate (Note: Denotes a main invitee not attending the event, sending a surrogate in their place.) NI Not invited I Invited A Absent invitee				
Date	Organizer(s)	Moderator(s)	PP	PSOE	Vox	Audience	Ref.
5 March	RTVE	Xabier Fortes	P Mañueco	P Martínez	P Pollán	10.9% (76,000) (Note: In Castile and León, the debate was broadcast on La 1 (67,000; 9.7%) and 24 Horas (9,000; 1.2%). Nationwide, the debate was broadcast on 24 Horas (103,000; 0.6%).)	
10 March	CyLTV	María Núñez; Antonio Renedo	P Mañueco	P Martínez	P Pollán	1.8% (12,000)	

== Opinion polls ==
The tables below list opinion polling results in reverse chronological order, showing the most recent first and using the dates when the survey fieldwork was done, as opposed to the date of publication. Where the fieldwork dates are unknown, the date of publication is given instead. The highest percentage figure in each polling survey is displayed with its background shaded in the leading party's colour. If a tie ensues, this is applied to the figures with the highest percentages. The "Lead" column on the right shows the percentage-point difference between the parties with the highest percentages in a poll.

=== Graphical summary ===
Local regression trend line of poll results from 13 February 2022 to 15 March 2026, with each line corresponding to a political party.

=== Voting intention estimates ===
The table below lists weighted voting intention estimates. Refusals are generally excluded from the party vote percentages, while question wording and the treatment of "don't know" responses and those not intending to vote may vary between polling organisations. When available, seat projections determined by the polling organisations are displayed below (or in place of) the percentages in a smaller font; 42 seats were required for an absolute majority in the Cortes of Castile and León (41 in the 2022 election).

Color key:

Poll conducted after legal ban on opinion polls

Polling firm/Commissioner	Fieldwork date	Sample size	Turnout	PP	PSOE	Vox	Podemos	Cs	UPL	SY	XAV	IUCyL	Sumar	SALF	Lead
2026 regional election	15 Mar 2026	—N/a	60.6	35.4; 33	30.8; 30	18.9; 14	0.8; 0	0.4; 0	4.3; 3	0.7; 1	0.9; 1	2.3; 0	(Note: Within IU.)	1.4; 0	4.6
GAD3	15 Mar 2026	?	?	? 33	? 28	? 17	? 0	? 0	? 3	? 1	? 0	? 0		–	?
NC Report/La Razón	15 Mar 2026	?	?	32.9; 31/32	29.2; 26/27	20.1; 17/18	2.0; 0	? 0	4.8; 3	1.4; 2	1.0; 1	3.6; 1		–	3.7
PP	14 Mar 2026	?	?	34.0– 36.0; 31/35	29.0– 30.0; 26/29	17.0– 19.0; 13/17	–	–	–	–	–	–		–	5.0– 6.0
SocioMétrica/El Español	13–14 Mar 2026	1,000	?	31.5; 30/33	28.2; 24/27	20.5; 17/19	2.1; 0	? 0	5.5; 3/4	1.2; 2	1.0; 0/1	3.8; 0/1		2.4; 0	3.3
Sigma Dos/El Mundo	9–14 Mar 2026	2,401	?	33.7; 30/32	29.8; 25/27	21.1; 17/19	2.3; 0	? 0	4.8; 3/4	1.5; 2	1.2; 1	3.8; 0/1		–	3.9
Celeste-Tel/Onda Cero	9 Mar 2026	1,100	?	34.1; 32	27.9; 26	19.4; 17	2.7; 0	0.7; 0	5.3; 4	1.0; 1	0.9; 1	4.4; 1		–	6.2
Data10/Okdiario	8–9 Mar 2026	1,500	?	33.4; 31	28.5; 27	20.0; 17	1.8; 0	? 0	5.4; 4	1.1; 1	1.3; 1	4.2; 1		–	4.9
SocioMétrica/El Español	8–9 Mar 2026	1,500	?	32.0; 30/33	28.4; 25/27	20.4; 16/19	1.9; 0	? 0	4.8; 3/4	1.1; 1/2	1.0; 1	4.1; 0/1		2.5; 0	3.6
EM-Analytics/Electomanía	15 Feb–8 Mar 2026	1,508	?	32.5; 31	29.6; 27	20.6; 17	2.2; 0	? 0	5.0; 4	0.9; 1	0.9; 1	4.1; 1		2.1; 0	2.9
Target Point/El Debate	4–7 Mar 2026	1,129	?	29.2; 28/30	28.7; 26/28	21.3; 18/20	2.3; 0	? 0	5.6; 4	1.5; 2	0.8; 1	4.3; 1		–	0.5
NC Report/La Razón	27 Feb–6 Mar 2026	1,000	57.3	34.5; 31/32	28.3; 26/27	19.1; 16/17	2.3; 0	? 0	5.0; 3	1.1; 2	1.0; 1	4.2; 1		–	6.2
Sigma Dos/El Mundo	23 Feb–6 Mar 2026	2,360	?	35.8; 31/34	29.8; 26/28	19.8; 14/17	2.9; 0	? 0	4.6; 3/4	0.9; 1/2	1.1; 1	3.8; 0/1		–	6.0
Hamalgama Métrica/Vozpópuli	2–5 Mar 2026	1,000	?	33.2; 31	28.1; 26	20.6; 18	2.6; 0	0.6; 0	5.1; 4	0.9; 1	0.8; 1	4.1; 1		–	5.1
GAD3/ABC	2–4 Mar 2026	1,002	?	34.8; 33/34	28.6; 26/29	19.5; 16/18	? 0	? 0	5.4; 3	1.1; 1	0.6; 0	? 0		–	6.2
40dB/Prisa	27 Feb–4 Mar 2026	1,200	?	31.1; 28/33	28.4; 24/26	20.8; 16/20	1.8; 0	? 0	5.7; 4	1.4; 2/3	1.2; 1	3.6; 0/1		2.3; 0	2.7
GESOP/Prensa Ibérica	3 Mar 2026	802	60	29.6; 29/32	27.5; 26/29	20.0; 16/19	2.1; 0	? 0	4.5; 3	1.0; 1/2	1.3; 1	4.0; 1		–	2.1
Sigma Dos/RTVCyL	20 Feb–3 Mar 2026	2,600	?	35.5; 32/35	29.6; 26/28	19.7; 14/16	2.4; 0	0.2; 0	4.5; 3/4	0.8; 1	0.9; 1	3.6; 0/1		–	5.9
EM-Analytics/Electomanía	15 Feb–1 Mar 2026	1,191	?	33.3; 32	29.2; 27	19.8; 16	2.6; 0	? 0	4.8; 3	0.9; 2	0.8; 1	4.5; 1		2.2; 0	4.1
NC Report/La Razón	23–27 Feb 2026	1,000	57.1	35.6; 32/33	27.6; 26/27	17.9; 15/16	2.0; 0	? 0	4.9; 3	1.4; 2	1.2; 1	3.8; 1		–	8.0
EM-Analytics/Electomanía	7–22 Feb 2026	1,382	?	33.9; 32	27.9; 27	20.0; 17	2.9; 0	? 0	4.9; 3	0.9; 1	0.9; 1	4.5; 1		2.1; 0	6.0
SyM Consulting/La Nueva Crónica	16–21 Feb 2026	7,927	?	33.1; 28/31	27.1; 20/25	23.7; 19/23	3.4; 0/1	1.7; 0	4.9; 3/4	1.4; 2/3	1.2; 1	(Note: Within Unidas Podemos.)		–	6.0
Sigma Dos/El Mundo	9–19 Feb 2026	1,954	?	35.8; 32/35	29.8; 26/28	16.8; 13/14	3.7; 0	? 0	4.8; 3/4	1.2; 1/2	0.8; 0/1	4.5; 0/1		–	6.0
EM-Analytics/Electomanía	1–15 Feb 2026	1,244	?	33.4; 32	27.9; 28	20.1; 16	3.9; 0	? 0	4.8; 3	0.9; 1	0.9; 1	4.0; 1		2.0; 0	5.5
SocioMétrica/El Español	12–14 Feb 2026	1,500	?	31.6; 30/33	27.3; 23/26	20.8; 18/21	2.2; 0	? 0	6.3; 4/5	0.9; 1/2	1.0; 1	3.6; 0/1		2.0; 0	4.3
CIS (Ateneo del Dato) (Note: Alternative projection based on raw CIS data.)	6–13 Feb 2026	8,039	?	33.2; 31/34	27.8; 23/26	20.8; 16/20	2.2; 0	? 0	5.1; 3/4	1.2; 2	1.0; 1	4.1; 0/1		–	5.4
CIS	6–13 Feb 2026	8,039	?	33.4; 28/38	32.3; 26/35	16.1; 11/19	3.1; 0/1	? 0	4.9; 2/4	0.7; 0/1	0.7; 0/1	5.1; 0/4		0.8; 0	1.1
EM-Analytics/Electomanía	15 Jan–8 Feb 2026	1,228	?	38.2; 35	29.4; 27	18.5; 13	4.0; 1	? 0	4.5; 3	1.0; 2	0.8; 1	1.3; 0		–	8.8
SyM Consulting/La Nueva Crónica	25 Nov–1 Dec 2025	7,510	64.2	32.1; 28/34	28.1; 23/27	20.5; 14/20	4.1; 0/2	3.3; 1	4.3; 3	1.7; 3	1.2; 1			–	4.0
SocioMétrica/El Español	6–9 Oct 2025	1,200	?	36.7; 35	31.4; 27	17.1; 13	4.3; 1	? 0	3.9; 3	1.0; 2	? 1			–	5.3
NC Report/La Razón	26 Sep–9 Oct 2025	1,000	55.6	37.8; 35/37	29.6; 27/29	14.4; 8/9	6.9; 2	? 0	5.0; 3	1.1; 2	0.6; 1			–	8.2
EM-Analytics/Electomanía	28 Jun–28 Jul 2025	1,375	?	43.4; 41	33.9; 29	10.4; 5	3.0; 1	0.6; 0	2.7; 2	0.9; 2	0.8; 1	(Note: Within Sumar.)	2.5; 0	–	9.5
Sigma Dos/RTVCyL	27 May–7 Jun 2025	2,700	?	36.7; 35/38	30.1; 27/30	13.2; 8	7.9; 3/4	? 0	4.9; 3	0.9; 1/2	0.5; 0/1			–	6.6
NC Report/La Razón	16–31 May 2025	450	?	? 39	28.6; 24	? 10	? 1	? 0	? 4	? 2	? 1			–	?
Sigma Dos/El Mundo	9–25 Apr 2025	1,223	?	36.8; 36/38	29.2; 27/28	13.2; 8/9	7.1; 2/3	0.3; 0	3.7; 3	1.0; 1/2	0.8; 0/1			–	7.6
NC Report/La Razón	15–18 Jul 2024	1,000	59.7	42.1; 41/43	29.3; 25/27	12.7; 7/9	? 0	0.5; 0	4.6; 3/4	1.4; 2	1.0; 0/1		3.3; 1	–	12.8
Data10/Okdiario	15–17 Jul 2024	1,500	?	42.3; 41	30.8; 26	9.3; 8	3.2; 0	1.2; 0	4.4; 3	1.2; 2	1.0; 1			–	11.5
2024 EP election	9 Jun 2024	—N/a	51.5	44.6 (46)	30.5 (28)	10.5 (7)	2.4 (0)	0.8 (0)	–	0.6 (0)	–		2.9 (0)	4.0 (0)	14.1
EM-Analytics/Electomanía	26 Aug–26 Sep 2023	1,375	?	40.4; 37	36.1; 32	8.6; 4	6.7; 2	4.8; 1	2.7; 2	1.1; 2	0.8; 1			–	4.3
2023 general election	23 Jul 2023	—N/a	69.4	41.5 (39)	32.3 (28)	13.8 (9)		–	1.6 (1)	0.7 (1)	0.5 (0)		7.0 (3)	–	9.2
EM-Analytics/Electomanía	14 Dec–17 Jan 2023	741	?	35.1; 32	31.8; 32	12.0; 9	5.5; 2	5.8; 1	3.6; 2	1.2; 2	1.0; 1		–	–	3.3
EM-Analytics/Electomanía	14 Sep–29 Oct 2022	587	?	33.6; 31	32.0; 31	13.5; 11	5.4; 2	5.6; 1	3.6; 2	1.2; 2	1.0; 1		–	–	1.6
2022 regional election	13 Feb 2022	—N/a	58.8	31.4; 31	30.0; 28	17.6; 13	5.1; 1	4.5; 1	4.3; 3	1.6; 3	1.1; 1		–	–	1.4

=== Voting preferences ===
The table below lists raw, unweighted voting preferences.

Polling firm/Commissioner	Fieldwork date	Sample size	PP	PSOE	Vox	Podemos	Cs	UPL	SY	XAV	IUCyL	Sumar	SALF	Question	X mark	Lead
2026 regional election (Note: Does not include non-resident citizens.)	15 Mar 2026	—N/a	23.0	19.9	12.3	0.5	0.2	2.8	0.5	0.6	1.4		0.9	—N/a	34.3	3.1
SocioMétrica/El Español	8–9 Mar 2026	1,500	21.9	22.3	14.1	1.8	–	3.1	1.7	0.9	4.8		1.4	13.8	7.2	0.4
40dB/Prisa	27 Feb–4 Mar 2026	1,200	19.0	19.8	12.5	3.0	1.1	5.3	1.2	0.6	3.0		2.2	17.8	8.2	0.8
SocioMétrica/El Español	12–14 Feb 2026	1,500	20.8	20.6	16.6	1.5	–	8.2	0.4	0.6	3.4		1.1	11.9	8.7	0.2
CIS	6–13 Feb 2026	8,039	25.7	25.3	13.0	2.3	–	4.0	0.6	0.5	3.7		0.6	16.5	3.3	0.4
CIS	7–31 Mar 2025	1,067	24.0	30.7	6.1	2.2	–	1.6	0.2	–	1.0	1.0	0.6	23.9	4.0	6.7
2024 EP election	9 Jun 2024	—N/a	24.5	16.7	5.8	1.3	0.5	–	0.3	–		1.6	2.2	—N/a	44.5	7.8
2023 general election	23 Jul 2023	—N/a	30.7	23.8	10.2		–	1.2	0.7	0.4		5.2	–	—N/a	25.6	6.9
2022 regional election	13 Feb 2022	—N/a	19.7	18.9	11.1	3.2	2.8	2.7	2.0	0.7		–	–	—N/a	36.6	0.8

=== Victory preferences ===
The table below lists opinion polling on the victory preferences for each party in the event of a regional election taking place.

Polling firm/Commissioner	Fieldwork date	Sample size	PP	PSOE	Vox	Podemos	UPL	SY	IUCyL	SALF	Other/ None	Question	Lead
CIS	6–13 Feb 2026	8,039	29.1	28.8	13.5	2.2	3.7	0.5	4.4	0.7	6.7	10.5	0.3

=== Victory likelihood ===
The table below lists opinion polling on the perceived likelihood of victory for each party in the event of a regional election taking place.

Polling firm/Commissioner	Fieldwork date	Sample size	PP	PSOE	Vox	Other/ None	Question	Lead
CIS	6–13 Feb 2026	8,039	79.0	6.2	3.7	1.0	10.0	72.8

=== Preferred President ===
The table below lists opinion polling on leader preferences to become president of the Regional Government of Castile and León.

All candidates

Polling firm/Commissioner	Fieldwork date	Sample size												Other/ None/ Not care	Question	Lead
Polling firm/Commissioner	Fieldwork date	Sample size	Mañueco PP	Tudanca PSOE	Martínez PSOE	Hierro Vox	Pollán Vox	Llamas Podemos	Gallego UPL	Ceña SY	Pascual XAV	Gascón IU	Echeva. SALF	Other/ None/ Not care	Question	Lead
GESOP/Prensa Ibérica	8 Mar 2026	802	26.7	–	15.3	–	4.3	2.6	–	–	–	1.6	–	22.3	27.1	11.4
GAD3/ABC	2–4 Mar 2026	1,002	39.0	–	23.0	–	9.0	–	–	–	–	–	–	29.0		16.0
40dB/Prisa	27 Feb–4 Mar 2026	1,200	22.5	–	21.4	–	11.1	3.5	5.0	1.5	0.9	2.1	2.8	14.3	14.7	1.1
SocioMétrica/El Español	12–14 Feb 2026	1,500	23.7	–	19.5	–	14.1	2.3	6.9	1.2	2.2	3.1	1.4	2.2	23.2	4.2
CIS	6–13 Feb 2026	8,039	28.1	–	22.2	–	10.0	1.9	3.9	0.5	0.6	3.3	0.3	11.5	17.7	5.9
SocioMétrica/El Español	6–9 Oct 2025	1,200	19.8	–	19.7	–	12.3	5.4	–	–	0.5	–	–	35.9		0.1
CIS (Note: Responses denoting a party's generic candidate are aggregated to that party's main candidate/leader at the time of the poll.)	7–31 Mar 2025	1,067	13.9	8.4	9.1	2.5	–	–	–	–	–	–	–	5.6	60.6	4.8

Mañueco vs. Martínez

Polling firm/Commissioner	Fieldwork date	Sample size			Other/ None/ Not care	Question	Lead
Polling firm/Commissioner	Fieldwork date	Sample size	Mañueco PP	Martínez PSOE	Other/ None/ Not care	Question	Lead
SocioMétrica/El Español	6–9 Oct 2025	1,200	38.5	33.7	–	27.7	4.8

=== Predicted President ===
The table below lists opinion polling on the perceived likelihood for each leader to become president of the Regional Government of Castile and León.

Polling firm/Commissioner	Fieldwork date	Sample size			Other/ None/ Not care	Question	Lead
Polling firm/Commissioner	Fieldwork date	Sample size	Mañueco PP	Martínez PSOE	Other/ None/ Not care	Question	Lead
SocioMétrica/El Español	6–9 Oct 2025	1,200	51.8	17.7	–	30.6	34.1
Sigma Dos/RTVCyL	27 May–7 Jun 2025	2,700	68.5	15.5	–	–	53.0

== Voter turnout ==
The table below shows registered voter turnout during the election. Figures for election day do not include non-resident citizens, while final figures do.

Province	Time (Election day)												Final		
Province	11:30			14:00			18:00			20:00			Final		
Province	2022	2026	+/–	2022	2026	+/–	2022	2026	+/–	2022	2026	+/–	2022	2026	+/–
Ávila	11.90%	12.46%	+0.56	34.85%	36.13%	+1.28	52.62%	52.50%	−0.12	63.95%	64.85%	+0.90	60.22%	61.01%	+0.79
Burgos	11.24%	12.71%	+1.47	35.08%	37.38%	+2.30	51.05%	52.49%	+1.44	62.80%	64.77%	+1.97	59.02%	60.96%	+1.94
León	10.01%	11.86%	+1.85	32.00%	34.64%	+2.64	48.54%	51.13%	+2.59	60.16%	63.38%	+3.22	53.50%	56.01%	+2.51
Palencia	11.24%	12.79%	+1.55	34.75%	38.02%	+3.27	52.40%	54.44%	+2.04	64.95%	67.38%	+2.43	61.60%	63.67%	+2.07
Salamanca	11.69%	12.71%	+1.02	34.84%	36.49%	+1.65	51.01%	52.15%	+1.14	62.74%	64.58%	+1.84	56.37%	57.87%	+1.50
Segovia	12.23%	13.10%	+0.87	35.74%	37.86%	+2.12	53.31%	53.97%	+0.66	64.98%	66.16%	+1.18	63.15%	64.25%	+1.10
Soria	12.20%	13.80%	+1.60	36.15%	39.32%	+3.17	51.96%	53.93%	+1.97	65.80%	67.14%	+1.34	59.81%	60.39%	+0.58
Valladolid	11.90%	12.97%	+1.07	37.21%	38.84%	+1.63	55.06%	56.24%	+1.18	66.80%	69.06%	+2.26	64.72%	66.82%	+2.10
Zamora	10.70%	12.43%	+1.73	32.24%	35.45%	+3.21	48.87%	51.27%	+2.40	60.80%	63.23%	+2.43	53.28%	55.09%	+1.81
Total	11.30%	12.63%	+1.33	34.73%	36.97%	+2.24	51.62%	53.19%	+1.57	63.44%	65.66%	+2.22	58.75%	60.63%	+1.88

== Results ==
=== Overall ===
← Summary of the 15 March 2026 Cortes of Castile and León election results
Parties and alliances	Popular vote			Seats	
Parties and alliances	Votes	%	±pp	Total	+/−
People's Party (PP)	444,296	35.39	+3.99	33	+2
Spanish Socialist Workers' Party (PSOE)	386,774	30.81	+0.79	30	+2
Vox (Vox)	237,100	18.89	+1.25	14	+1
Leonese People's Union (UPL)	54,096	4.31	+0.03	3	±0
United Left, Unite Movement, Greens Equo: In Common (IU–MS–VQ)^{1}	28,255	2.25	n/a	0	±0
The Party is Over (SALF)	17,554	1.40	New	0	±0
For Ávila (XAV)	11,518	0.92	−0.22	1	±0
We Can–Green Alliance CyL 2026 (Podemos–AV)^{1}	9,597	0.76	n/a	0	−1
Soria Now! (SY)	9,145	0.73	−0.86	1	−2
Animalist Party with the Environment (PACMA)^{2}	5,267	0.42	−0.12	0	±0
Blank Seats to Leave Empty Seats (EB)	4,861	0.39	+0.34	0	±0
Citizens–Party of the Citizenry (Cs)	4,509	0.36	−4.14	0	−1
Nine Castile and León (NueveCyL)	4,359	0.35	New	0	±0
Municipalist Burgalese Way (VBM)^{3}	3,621	0.29	−0.50	0	±0
Castilian Party–Commoners' Land (PCAS–TC)	3,137	0.25	+0.02	0	±0
Empty Spain (España Vaciada)^{4}	3,078	0.25	−0.75	0	±0
Coalition for El Bierzo (CBierzo)	1,992	0.16	−0.05	0	±0
Communist Party of the Workers of Spain (PCTE)	1,744	0.14	+0.03	0	±0
Let's Go Palencia (VP)	1,668	0.13	New	0	±0
For a Fairer World (M+J)	1,664	0.13	+0.04	0	±0
Regionalist Party of the Leonese Country (PREPAL)	898	0.07	−0.01	0	±0
Spanish Phalanx of the CNSO (FE de las JONS)	810	0.06	+0.03	0	±0
Forward Proyect (PAlantre)	391	0.03	New	0	±0
Nationalist Party of Castile and León–Citizen Reformist Union (PANCAL–URCI)	296	0.02	New	0	±0
Spanish Food Sovereignty (SAE)	123	0.01	New	0	±0
Blank ballots	18,570	1.48	+0.48		
Total	1,255,323			82	+1
Valid votes	1,255,323	98.70	−0.21		
Invalid votes	16,573	1.30	+0.21		
Votes cast / turnout	1,271,896	60.63	+1.88		
Abstentions	825,907	39.37	−1.88		
Registered voters	2,097,803				
Sources
Footnotes: ^{1} Within the United We Can Castile and León alliance in the 2022 election.; ^{2} Animalist Party with the Environment results are compared to Animalist Party Against Mistreatment of Animals totals in the 2022 election.; ^{3} Municipalist Burgalese Way results are compared to Empty Spain totals in Burgos in the 2022 election.; ^{4} Empty Spain results are compared to the combined totals of Empty Spain—not including results in Burgos—and Zamora Decides totals in the 2022 election.

Popular vote
PP	35.39%
PSOE	30.81%
Vox	18.89%
UPL	4.31%
IU–MS–Q	2.25%
SALF	1.40%
XAV	0.92%
SY	0.73%
Others	3.82%
Blank ballots	1.48%

Seats
PP	40.24%
PSOE	36.59%
Vox	17.07%
UPL	3.66%
XAV	1.22%
SY	1.22%

=== Distribution by constituency ===
Constituency	PP		PSOE		Vox		UPL		XAV		SY	
Constituency	%	S	%	S	%	S	%	S	%	S	%	S
Ávila	36.1	3	24.7	2	19.3	1			13.9	1		
Burgos	35.1	5	34.2	4	18.4	2						
León	28.1	4	28.4	4	16.5	2	20.8	3				
Palencia	35.6	3	34.2	3	20.4	1						
Salamanca	42.8	5	29.3	3	18.8	2	1.5	−				
Segovia	39.2	3	31.3	3	19.4	1						
Soria	28.6	1	32.2	2	15.8	1					19.9	1
Valladolid	36.2	6	32.0	6	20.7	3			0.1	−		
Zamora	38.0	3	30.6	3	19.9	1	2.8	−				
Total	35.4	33	30.8	30	18.9	14	4.3	3	0.9	1	0.7	1

== Aftermath ==
=== Government formation ===
Investiture; Nomination of Alfonso Fernández Mañueco (PP)
Ballot →	9 June 2026
Required majority →	42 out of 82
Yes: • PP (33); • Vox (14)	47 / 82
No: • PSOE (30); • UPL (3); • XAV (1); • SY (1)	35 / 82
Abstentions	0 / 82
Absentees	0 / 82

== Bibliography ==
- Ley Orgánica 5/1985, de 19 de junio, del Régimen Electoral General (Organic Law 5/1985). Official State Gazette (in Spanish). 19 June 1985 [version as of 14 July 2025]. BOE-A-1985-11672.
- Ley 3/1987, de 30 de marzo, Electoral de Castilla y León (Law 3/1987). Official State Gazette (in Spanish). 30 March 1987 [version as of 6 July 2017]. BOE-A-1987-9475.
- Ley 3/2001, de 3 de julio, del Gobierno y de la Administración de la Comunidad de Castilla y León (Law 3/2001). Official State Gazette (in Spanish). 3 July 2001 [version as of 14 May 2024]. BOE-A-2001-14243.
- Ley Orgánica 14/2007, de 30 de noviembre, de reforma del Estatuto de Autonomía de Castilla y León (Organic Law 14/2007). Official State Gazette (in Spanish). 30 November 2007 [version as of 11 April 2011]. BOE-A-2007-20635.
- Decreto 1/2026, de 19 de enero, del Presidente de la Junta de Castilla y León, por el que se convocan elecciones a las Cortes de Castilla y León (PDF) (Decree 1/2026). Official Gazette of Castile and León (in Spanish). 19 January 2026. BOCYL-D-20012026-12-1.
