= Eloísa Álvarez =

Spanish politician

Member of the Senate of Spain
- In office 13 December 2011 – 26 October 2015
- Constituency: Soria

Member of the Congress of Deputies
- In office 2 April 2004 – 27 September 2011
- Constituency: Soria

Mayor of Soria
- In office 1999–2003

Member of the Cortes of Castile and León
- In office 1995–1999
- Constituency: Soria

Personal details
- Born: Eloísa Álvarez Otero; 8 July 1956 Muriel Viejo, Soria, Spain
- Died: 5 September 2017 (aged 61) Soria, Spain
- Party: Spanish Socialist Workers' Party

Eloísa Álvarez Oteo (8 July 1956 – 5 September 2017) was a Spanish politician.

Born in Muriel Viejo in 1956, she was trained as a nurse. Álvarez became spokesperson of the provincial deputation of Soria in 1991, serving until 1995, when she was elected to the Cortes of Castile and León. Álvarez stepped down in 1999 when she assumed the mayoralty of Soria until 2003. From 2004 to 2011, she was a member of the Congress of Deputies for Soria. Between 2011 and 2015, Álvarez represented Soria in the Senate.
