= Jesús García-Conde =

Spanish former politician

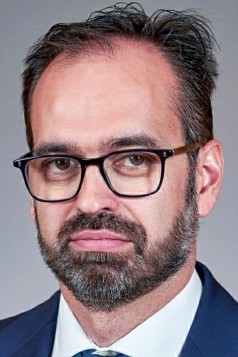

Jesús María García-Conde del Castillo is a Spanish former politician. As a member of Vox, he was his party's first member elected to the Cortes of Castile and León in 2019, and resigned in January 2021.

== Biography ==
Born in Valladolid, García-Conde obtained a degree in economics from the University of Valladolid and a master's degree in the same subject from the National University of Distance Education (UNED). As of 2019, he had 15 years of experience in business management, including at Ericsson and Vodafone.

García-Conde joined Vox in their founding year of 2014, becoming their vice president in Valladolid and a member of their national executive. He was announced as their candidate for President of the Regional Government of Castile and León in the 2019 Castilian-Leonese regional election. Running in the Valladolid constituency, he was Vox's only member elected to the Cortes of Castile and León. He sat in the mixed group in the parliament, alongside representatives from Podemos, For Ávila and the Leonese People's Union. In a press conference a month after his election, he proposed replacing the gender violence law with a domestic violence law independent of gender in the region, despite the gender violence law being a nationwide statute. In October 2019, García-Conde vetoed a prospective declaration of the Cortes to commit to fight climate change; the statement required unanimous approval.

On 28 January 2021, García-Conde resigned his parliamentary seat; the second name on the Vox list, José Ignacio de Uribe, declined the seat, so it went to the third name, Fátima Pinacho. While García-Conde ascribed his resignation to his professional and personal life in Madrid, sources within Vox told local newspaper El Norte de Castilla that there was a local split in the party between García-Conde's followers who had been with the party from the start, and a second group built around city council candidate Javier García Bartolomé.
