= Jesús Manuel Sánchez Cabrera =

Spanish politician

Jesús Manuel Sánchez Cabrera (born 1 August 1982) is a Spanish politician of the For Ávila (XAV) party. He was elected mayor of Ávila in 2019, having been the President of the Provincial Deputation of Ávila from 2015 to 2019, as a member of the People's Party (PP).

== Biography ==
Born in Ávila, Castile and León, Sánchez Cabrera studied Political and Administrative Sciences at the Complutense University of Madrid and worked in a bank from 2007 to 2015. In 2011, he was elected to the town council in Padiernos in the Province of Ávila, and into the Provincial Deputation. Four years later, he was installed as president of the deputation in a surprise move, as the designated candidate of the People's Party (PP) was Pablo Luis Gómez, a councillor in the provincial capital.

In December 2018, Sánchez Cabrera announced that he would not be the PP candidate for mayor of Ávila in the coming elections. The following March, two months before the vote, he was announced as the candidate for For Ávila (XAV), a local split from the PP. A motion of no confidence was then passed successfully against him in the provincial deputation, and he was succeeded by his former ally Carlos García González. In June, he was invested as mayor as his party took 11 out of 25 seats and the PP took 6; he ended 28 years of PP control in the city. He retained the exact amount of seats in 2023, choosing to preside over a minority government in dialogue with all opposition parties.
