= Soria ¡Ya! =

Regionalist political party in Spain

Soria Now! Soria ¡Ya!
- Leader: Juan Antonio Palomar
- Founded: 2001
- Headquarters: Soria
- Ideology: Localism; Regionalism
- Political position: Big tent
- National affiliation: Empty Spain
- Colors: Black
- Congress of Deputies (Soria seats): 0 / 2
- Senate (Soria seats): 0 / 4
- Cortes of Castile and León (Soria seats): 1 / 5

Website
- soriaya.org

Soria ¡Ya! (English: Soria Now!) is a political party in the province of Soria, Castile and León, Spain. It was founded in 2001 to address the emerging Soria's demands for a fairer and more equal treatment as a result of the perceived institutional neglect to which it was placed by the different national and regional governments. In December 2021, it confirmed its electoral run in the 2022 Castilian-Leonese regional election as part of the Empty Spain (Spanish for España Vaciada) movement.

== Electoral performance ==
=== Cortes of Castile and León ===
Cortes of Castile and León
Election	Leading candidate	Votes	%	Seats	Gov.
2022	Ángel Ceña	19,385	1.6 (#8)	3 / 81	No
2026	Ángel Ceña	9,145	0.7 (#9)	1 / 82	No
