= Pedro Pascual (politician) =

Spanish politician

Pedro José Pascual Muñoz (born 1964) is a Spanish politician of the party For Ávila (XAV). He was elected to the Cortes of Castile and León in 2019, and retained his seat in 2022 and 2026.

== Biography ==
Born in Ávila and a medical doctor by profession, Pascual became president of Real Ávila CF in July 2017. He had previously been an amateur footballer, while a local trophy was named after his father of the same name, and his son Carlos played for Real Ávila.

Pascual was named fifth on the People's Party (PP) list in the Ávila constituency in the 2015 Castilian-Leonese regional election, but the party fell to four seats by losing one to Citizens (Cs).

The party For Ávila (XAV) split from the PP at the start of 2019, and Pascual was announced as their lead candidate for the 2019 Castilian-Leonese regional election. His party, which had four months of history and only 257 members, won a seat for him in the Cortes, as well as taking a majority of seats on the Ávila city council and ending 28 years of PP rule there.

In 2021, the PP-led government of Alfonso Fernández Mañueco lost its absolute majority when María Montero of Cs defected to the opposition. Pascual put forward 21 points for the PP to endorse, in order for him to vote through their budget. They only could support 16, and Mañueco called early elections when he felt that Cs were negotiating the remaining points with Pascual behind his back.

In the 2022 Castilian-Leonese regional election, Pascual retained his seat as XAV's sole deputy. He repeated this four years later, as his party came third behind the PP and Vox in the constituency.
