= Muriel Viejo =

- Municipality
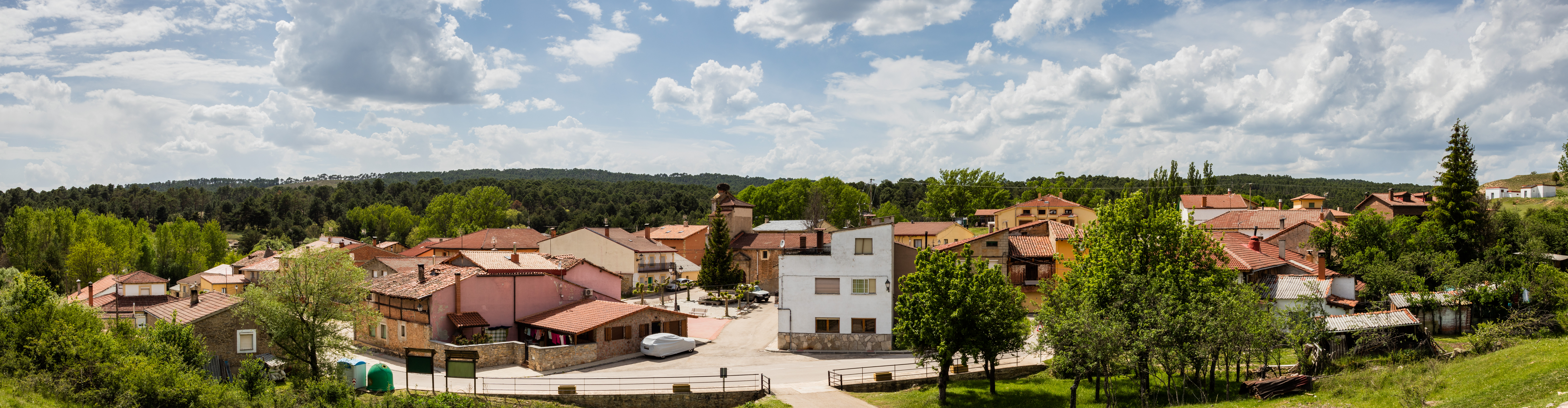
- View of Muriel Viejo, Soria, Spain

- Flag Coat of arms

- Location in Spain. Muriel Viejo (Spain)
- Coordinates: 41°58′12″N 2°18′50″W
- Country: Spain
- Autonomous community: Castile and León
- Province: Soria
- Municipality: Muriel Viejo

Area
  - Total: 11.36 km^{2} (4.39 sq mi)
- Elevation: 1,090 m (3,580 ft)

Population (2025-01-01)
  - Total: 73
  - Density: 6.4/km^{2} (17/sq mi)
- Time zone: UTC+1 (CET)
  - Summer (DST): UTC+2 (CEST)
- Website: Official website

Muriel Viejo is a municipality located in the province of Soria, Castile and León, Spain. According to the 2004 census (INE), the municipality had a population of 69 inhabitants.
