= Empty Spain =

Political party in Spain

Empty Spain España Vaciada
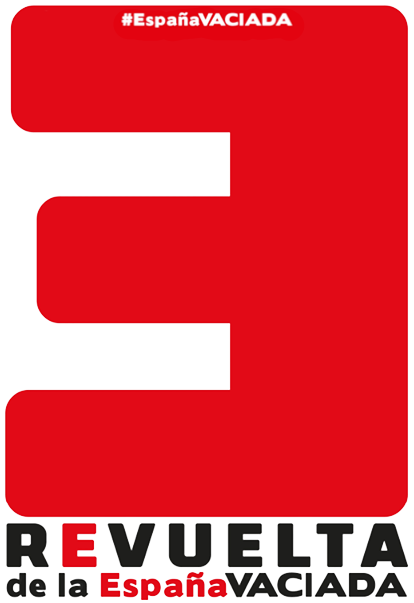
- National Coordinator: Teo Nieto
- Founded: 30 September 2021
- Headquarters: Miguel de Cervantes, nº 8 local 44600, Alcañiz
- Ideology: Localism; Agrarianism; Anti-depopulation; Rural development
- Political position: Big tent
- Congress of Deputies: 0 / 350
- Spanish Senate: 0 / 266
- Cortes of Castile and León: 0 / 81

Website
- españavaciada.org

Empty Spain (Spanish: España Vaciada, lit. 'Emptied Spain', EV) is a political party in Spain. EV, whose name derives from the coined term to refer to Spain's rural and sparsely populated interior provinces was formed as a political platform by a large number of citizen collectives and associations, in order to contest the 2023 Spanish general election. In this, they were inspired by the success of the Teruel Existe candidacy (a part of the Empty Spain party, Spanish for "Teruel Exists") in the November 2019 Spanish general election.

It was registered as a political party on 30 September 2021. By November 2021, it was confirmed that over 160 collectives and associations from about 30 Spanish provinces committed themselves to finalizing the electoral platform before January 2022. On 30 November, national deputy and member of Teruel Existe, Tomás Guitarte, confirmed their intention to contest the next national elections as a single candidacy.

The first election contested by the platform was 2022 Castilian-Leonese regional elections. It ran lists in five of the nine province of Castile and León. In the Province of Soria, member party Soria ¡Ya! was the most voted for party with 42.6%, taking three of the five seats for the province. In the 2023 Spanish general election, Empty Spain lost all its seats in the Cortes Generales, becoming extra-parliamentary.

Provincial organization of the España Vaciada party: provinces where EV has a local branch constituted provinces where EV is represented by a local party

== Member parties ==
The federation of parties of Empty Spain was constituted on 27 November 2022. On 15 January 2023, SOS West joined the federation representing Asturias.

Party	Notes
Empty Spain (EV)	In Burgos, Palencia, Valladolid, Salamanca, León, Toledo, Ciudad Real and La Rioja.
Teruel Exists (TE)	In Teruel.
Aragón Exists (AE)	In Zaragoza and Huesca.
Soria Now! (SY)	In Soria.
Cuenca Now (+CU)	In Cuenca.
SOS West (SOS Occidente)	In Asturias.

=== Former members ===
Party	Notes
Jaén Deserves More (JM+)	In Jaén. Suspended its relationship with Empty Spain in 2023.
Burgalese Way (VB)	In Burgos. Suspended its relationship with Empty Spain in 2023.

== Electoral performance ==
=== Cortes Generales ===
Election	Votes	%	Congress of Deputies	Seat change	Senate	Seat change	Government
2023	36,397	0.15%	0 / 350	1	0 / 208	2	No seats

=== Regional parliaments ===
Region	Election	Votes	%	Seats	Government
Andalusia	2022 (Note: Contested as Jaén Merece Más in the Province of Jaén)	18,685	0.51 (#8)	0 / 109	No seats
Castile and León	2022 (Note: Seats won by Soria ¡Ya! in the Province of Soria.) (Note: Contested as Empty Spain in the provinces of Palencia, Salamanca and Valladolid.) (Note: Contested as Vía Burgalesa in the provinces of Burgos.)	37,885	3.14 (#7)	3 / 81	Opposition
Castile and León	2026	3,078	0.25 (#16)	0 / 81	Opposition
Aragón	2023 (Note: Contested as Aragón Existe - Teruel Existe coalition) (Note: Seats won by Teruel Existe in the Province of Teruel.)	32,717	5.00 (#5)	3 / 67	Opposition
Asturias	2023 (Note: Contested as SOS Asturias - Empty Spain.)	5,713	1.10 (#7)	0 / 45	No seats
Castile-La Mancha	2023 (Note: Contested as +Cuenca Now - Empty Spain in the Province of the Cuenca.) (Note: Contested as Empty Spain in the provinces of Ciudad Real and Toledo.)	3,601	0.34 (#7)	0 / 33	No seats
La Rioja	2023 (Note: Contested as Partido Riojano - Empty Spain coalition.)	6,016	3.58 (#5)	0 / 33	No seats
