= Javier Iglesias =

Spanish politician (born 1969)

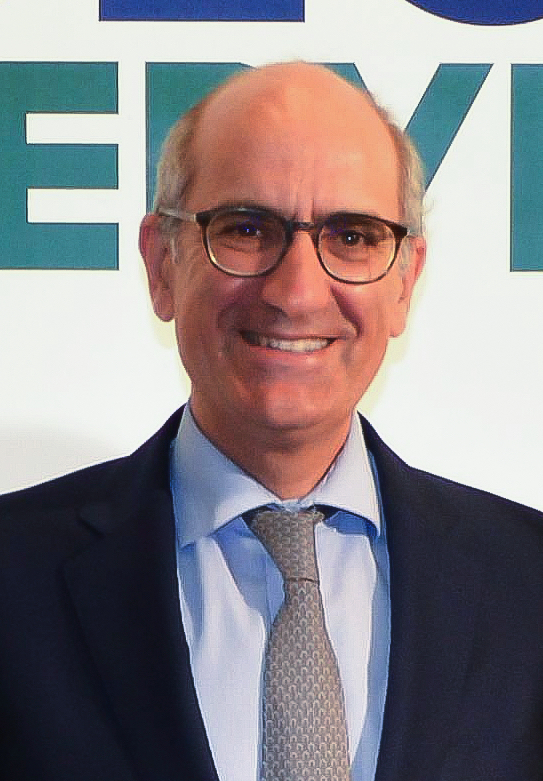
- Iglesias in 2022

President of the Provincial Deputation of Salamanca
- Incumbent
- Assumed office 30 June 2011
- Preceded by: Isabel Jiménez García

Personal details
- Born: 26 April 1969 (age 57)
- Party: People's Party

Francisco Javier Iglesias García (born 26 April 1969) is a Spanish politician serving as president of the provincial deputation of Salamanca since 2011. He was a member of the Congress of Deputies from 1996 to 2000 and from 2000 to 2004. He was a member of the Senate from 2004 to 2008 and from 2016 to 2019. From 1995 to 2015, he served as mayor of Ciudad Rodrigo.
