= 2019 Castilian-Leonese regional election =

Election in the Spanish region of Castile and León

- 26 May 2019

All 81 seats in the Cortes of Castile and León 41 seats needed for a majority
- Opinion polls
- Registered: 2,114,811 ▼1.7%
- Turnout: 1,391,502 (65.8%) ▲1.1 pp
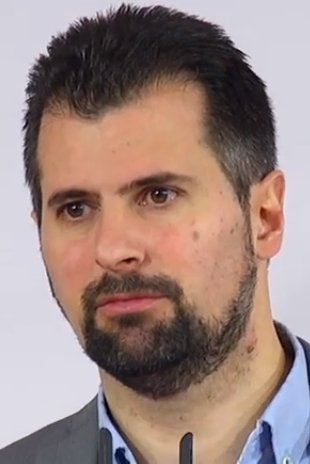

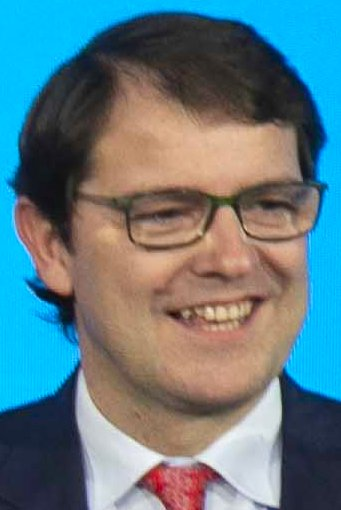

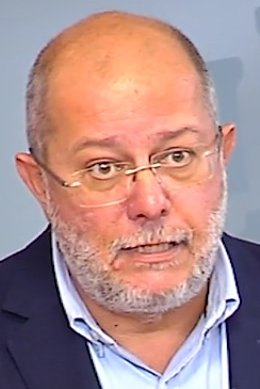

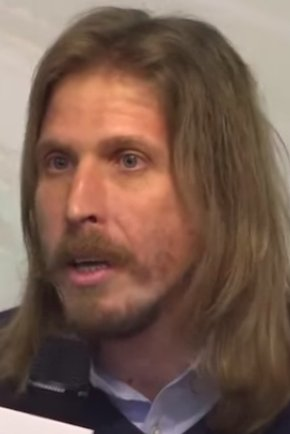

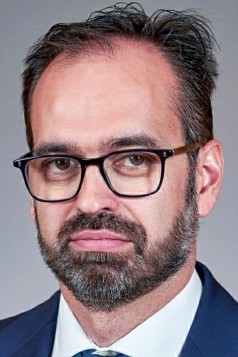

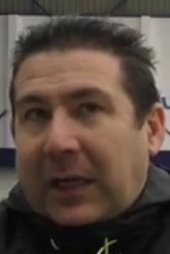

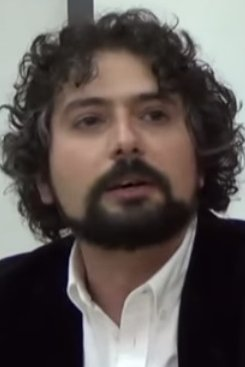
	First party	Second party	Third party
Leader	Luis Tudanca	Alfonso Fernández Mañueco	Francisco Igea
Party	PSOE	PP	Cs
Leader since	18 October 2014	1 April 2017	11 March 2019
Leader's seat	Burgos	Salamanca	Valladolid
Last election	25 seats, 25.9%	42 seats, 37.7%	5 seats, 10.3%
Seats won	35	29	12
Seat change	▲10	▼13	▲7
Popular vote	479,916	433,905	205,855
Percentage	34.8%	31.5%	14.9%
Swing	▲8.9 pp	▼6.1 pp	▲4.6 pp
	Fourth party	Fifth party	Sixth party
Leader	Pablo Fernández	Jesús García-Conde	Luis Mariano Santos
Party	Podemos–Equo	Vox	UPL
Leader since	14 February 2015	10 May 2019	27 March 2015
Leader's seat	León	Valladolid	León
Last election	10 seats, 12.1%	0 seats, 0.7%	1 seat, 1.4%
Seats won	2	1	1
Seat change	▼8	▲1	0
Popular vote	68,869	75,731	28,057
Percentage	5.0%	5.5%	2.0%
Swing	▼7.1 pp	▲4.8 pp	▲0.6 pp
	Seventh party	Eighth party
Leader	Pedro Pascual	José Sarrión
Party	XAV	IU–A–PCAS/TC– ALTER
Leader since	9 April 2019	15 February 2015
Leader's seat	Ávila	Valladolid
Last election	Did not contest	1 seat, 4.5% (Note: Results for IU–Equo (4.1%, 1 seat) and PCAS–TC–Pacto (0.3%, 0 seats) in the 2015 election.)
Seats won	1	0
Seat change	▲1	▼1
Popular vote	9,455	31,580
Percentage	0.7%	2.3%
Swing	New party	▼2.2 pp
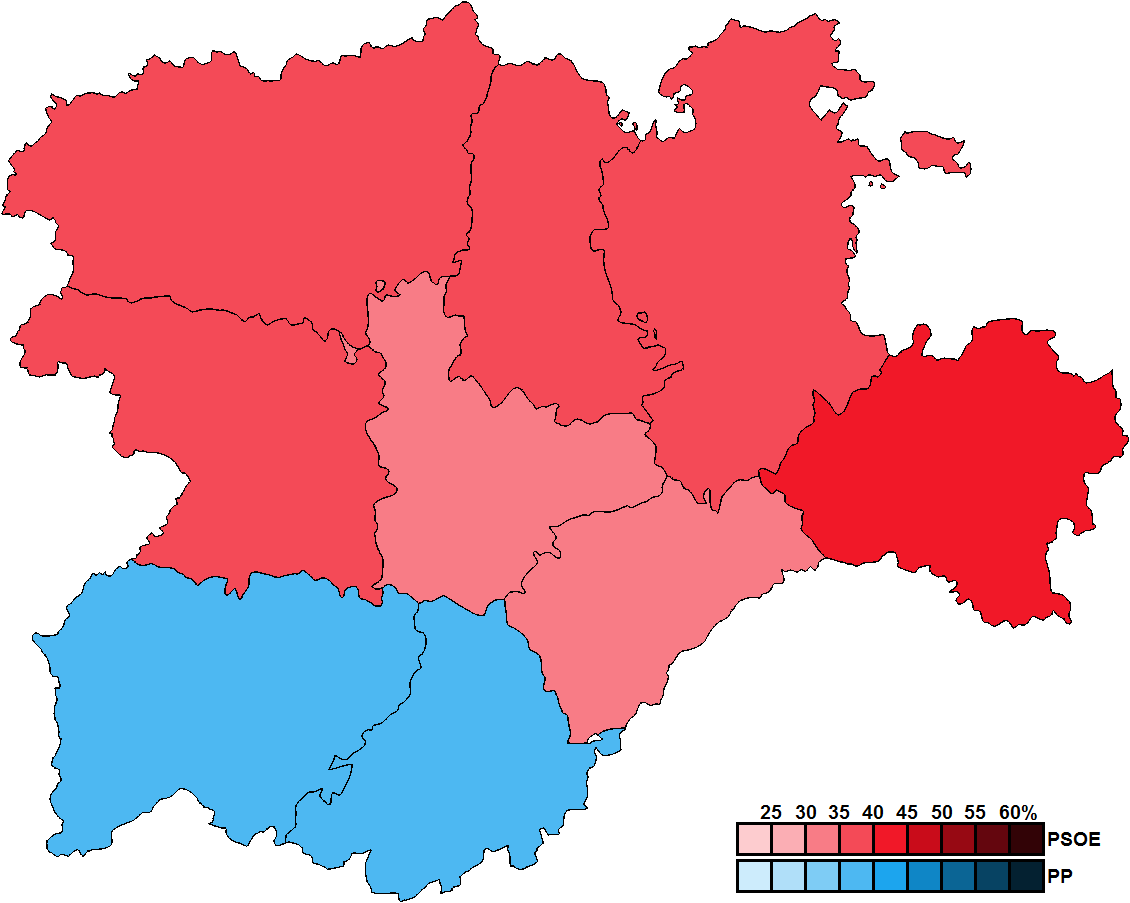
President before election
Juan Vicente Herrera
PP
President after election
Alfonso Fernández Mañueco
PP

A regional election was held in Castile and León on 26 May 2019 to elect the 10th Cortes of the autonomous community. All 81 seats in the Cortes were up for election. It was held concurrently with regional elections in eleven other autonomous communities and local elections all across Spain, as well as the 2019 European Parliament election.

The Spanish Socialist Workers' Party (PSOE) saw its first plurality in a regional election in Castile and León since 1983, being only the second time in history that the party emerged as the most voted political force in a regional election. Conversely, support for the governing People's Party (PP) collapsed into its worst historical parliamentary showing, whereas the liberal Citizens (Cs) and the far-right Vox made substantial gains at its expense, though support for the latter, which rose from 0.7% to 5.5%, failed to materialize in more than one single seat due to the electoral system. Concurrently, the Podemos–Equo alliance suffered a sizeable setback after losing eight out of the ten seats Podemos had won on its own in 2015.

As a result of PP and Cs being able to muster a slim majority of 41 seats in the Cortes, the two centre-right parties were able to form a coalition government—the second in the community's history, after the coalition between the PP and the late Democratic and Social Centre (CDS) that was formed for the 1989–1991 period—under PP candidate Alfonso Fernández Mañueco, who became the region's new president.

== Overview ==
Under the 2007 Statute of Autonomy, the Cortes of Castile and León was the unicameral legislature of the homonymous autonomous community, having legislative power in devolved matters, as well as the ability to grant or withdraw confidence from a regional president. The electoral and procedural rules were supplemented by national law provisions.

=== Date ===
The term of the Cortes of Castile and León expired four years after the date of its previous election, unless it was dissolved earlier. The election decree was required to be issued no later than 25 days before the scheduled expiration date of parliament and published on the following day in the Official Gazette of Castile and León (BOCYL), with election day taking place 54 days after the decree's publication. The previous election was held on 24 May 2015, which meant that the chamber's term would have expired on 24 May 2019. The election decree was required to be published in the BOCYL no later than 30 April 2019, setting the latest possible date for election day on 23 June 2019.

The regional president had the prerogative to dissolve the Cortes of Castile and León at any given time and call a snap election, provided that no motion of no confidence was in process and that dissolution did not occur either during the first legislative session or before one year after a previous one. In the event of an investiture process failing to elect a regional president within a two-month period from the first ballot, the Cortes were to be automatically dissolved and a fresh election called.

The Cortes of Castile and León was officially dissolved on 2 April 2019 with the publication of the corresponding decree in the BOCYL, setting election day for 26 May and scheduling for the chamber to reconvene on 21 June.

=== Electoral system ===
Voting for the Cortes was based on universal suffrage, comprising all Spanish nationals over 18 years of age, registered in Castile and León and with full political rights, provided that they had not been deprived of the right to vote by a final sentence. (Note: Amendments in 2018 granted the right to vote to those legally incapacitated.) Additionally, non-resident citizens were required to apply for voting, a system known as "begged" voting (Spanish: Voto rogado).

The Cortes of Castile and León had three seats per each multi-member constituency—corresponding to the provinces of Ávila, Burgos, León, Palencia, Salamanca, Segovia, Soria, Valladolid and Zamora—plus one additional seat per 45,000 inhabitants or fraction above 22,500. All were elected using the D'Hondt method and closed-list proportional voting, with a three percent-threshold of valid votes (including blank ballots) in each constituency. The use of this electoral method resulted in a higher effective threshold depending on district magnitude and vote distribution.

As a result of the aforementioned allocation, each Cortes constituency was entitled the following seats:

Seats	Constituencies
15	Valladolid
13	León^{(−1)}
11	Burgos
10	Salamanca^{(−1)}
7	Ávila, Palencia, Zamora
6	Segovia^{(−1)}
5	Soria

The law did not provide for by-elections to fill vacant seats; instead, any vacancies arising after the proclamation of candidates and during the legislative term were filled by the next candidates on the party lists or, when required, by designated substitutes.

=== Outgoing parliament ===
The table below shows the composition of the parliamentary groups in the chamber at the time of dissolution.

Parliamentary composition in April 2019
Groups	Parties	Legislators	
Groups	Parties	Seats	Total
People's Parliamentary Group	PP	42	42
Socialist Parliamentary Group	PSOE	25	25
We Can Castile and León Parliamentary Group	Podemos	10	10
Citizens Parliamentary Group	Cs	5	5
Mixed Parliamentary Group	IUCyL	1	2
Mixed Parliamentary Group	UPL	1	2

== Parties and candidates ==
The electoral law allowed for parties and federations registered in the interior ministry, alliances and groupings of electors to present lists of candidates. Parties and federations intending to form an alliance were required to inform the relevant electoral commission within 10 days of the election call, whereas groupings of electors needed to secure the signature of at least one percent of the electorate in the constituencies for which they sought election, disallowing electors from signing for more than one list. Additionally, a balanced composition of men and women was required in the electoral lists, so that candidates of either sex made up at least 40 percent of the total composition.

Below is a list of the main parties and alliances which contested the election:

Candidacy	Parties and alliances	Leading candidate	Ideology	Previous result		Gov.	Ref.
Candidacy	Parties and alliances	Leading candidate	Ideology	Vote %	Seats	Gov.	Ref.
PP	List: People's Party (PP)	Alfonso Fernández Mañueco	Conservatism; Christian democracy	37.7%	42	Yes	
PSOE	List: Spanish Socialist Workers' Party (PSOE)	Luis Tudanca	Social democracy	25.9%	25	No	
Podemos– Equo	List: We Can (Podemos); Equo (Equo)	Pablo Fernández	Left-wing populism Direct democracy Democratic socialism	12.1%	10	No	
Cs	List: Citizens–Party of the Citizenry (Cs)	Francisco Igea	Liberalism	10.3%	5	No	
IU–A–PCAS/ TC–ALTER	List: United Left of Castile and León (IUCyL) – Communist Party of Castile and León (PCCyL) – The Dawn Marxist Organization (La Aurora (OM)) – Republican Left (IR) – Feminist Party of Spain (PFE); Anticapitalists (Anticapitalistas); Castilian Party–Commoners' Land (PCAS–TC); Republican Alternative (ALTER)	José Sarrión	Socialism; Communism	4.5%	1	No	
UPL	List: Leonese People's Union (UPL)	Luis Mariano Santos	Leonesism; Regionalism; Autonomism	1.4%	1	No	
Vox	List: Vox (Vox)	Jesús García-Conde	Right-wing populism Ultranationalism; National conservatism	0.7%	0	No	
XAV	List: For Ávila (XAV)	Pedro Pascual	Regionalism	Did not contest		No	

== Campaign ==
=== Debates ===
After amendments in 2017, the electoral law of Castile and León provided for the presidential candidates of the parties having a parliamentary group in the Cortes to participate in, at least, two leaders' debates to be held during the electoral campaign.

2019 Castilian-Leonese regional election debates
Date	Organizer(s)	Moderator(s)	P Present (Note: Denotes a main invitee attending the event.) S Surrogate (Note: Denotes a main invitee not attending the event, sending a surrogate in their place.) NI Not invited I Invited A Absent invitee					
Date	Organizer(s)	Moderator(s)	PP	PSOE	Podemos	Cs	Audience	Ref.
14 May	CyLTV	Nati Melendre; Alejandra Abad	P Mañueco	P Tudanca	P Fernández	P Igea	? (228,000)	
21 May	CyLTV	Nati Melendre; Alejandra Abad	P Mañueco	P Tudanca	P Fernández	P Igea	? (183,000)	

== Opinion polls ==
The tables below list opinion polling results in reverse chronological order, showing the most recent first and using the dates when the survey fieldwork was done, as opposed to the date of publication. Where the fieldwork dates are unknown, the date of publication is given instead. The highest percentage figure in each polling survey is displayed with its background shaded in the leading party's colour. If a tie ensues, this is applied to the figures with the highest percentages. The "Lead" column on the right shows the percentage-point difference between the parties with the highest percentages in a poll.

=== Voting intention estimates ===
The table below lists weighted voting intention estimates. Refusals are generally excluded from the party vote percentages, while question wording and the treatment of "don't know" responses and those not intending to vote may vary between polling organisations. When available, seat projections determined by the polling organisations are displayed below (or in place of) the percentages in a smaller font; 41 seats were required for an absolute majority in the Cortes of Castile and León (43 in the 2015 election).

Color key:

Poll conducted after legal ban on opinion polls

Polling firm/Commissioner	Fieldwork date	Sample size	Turnout	PP	PSOE	Podemos	Cs	IUCyL	UPL	Vox	Unidas Podemos	XAV	Lead
2019 regional election	26 May 2019	—N/a	65.8	31.5; 29	34.8; 35	5.0; 2	14.9; 12	2.3; 0	2.0; 1	5.5; 1	–	0.7; 1	3.3
ElectoPanel/Electomanía	22–23 May 2019	?	?	30.5; 30	31.7; 31	8.1; 3	17.8; 15	1.4; 0	1.5; 1	6.7; 1	–	–	1.2
ElectoPanel/Electomanía	21–22 May 2019	?	?	30.9; 30	31.8; 32	7.9; 3	17.7; 14	1.5; 0	1.5; 1	6.4; 1	–	–	0.9
ElectoPanel/Electomanía	20–21 May 2019	?	?	31.0; 30	31.7; 30	7.9; 3	18.0; 16	1.5; 0	1.5; 1	6.7; 1	–	–	0.7
ElectoPanel/Electomanía	19–20 May 2019	?	?	30.8; 30	31.5; 30	7.7; 3	18.3; 16	1.4; 0	1.5; 1	6.5; 1	–	–	0.7
KeyData/Público	19 May 2019	?	68.1	27.4; 27	28.6; 31	10.6; 3	16.9; 17	3.0; 0	? 0	9.7; 3	–	–	1.2
NC Report/La Razón	19 May 2019	?	?	31.4; 28/33	31.9; 28/33	? 3/4	? 13/16	? 0/1	? 1	? 2/3	–	–	0.5
Sigma Dos/El Mundo	19 May 2019	?	?	31.2; 29/33	33.1; 29/34	7.1; 2/3	16.4; 14	1.4; 0	1.7; 1	6.0; 2	–	–	1.9
ElectoPanel/Electomanía	16–19 May 2019	?	?	30.4; 30	31.2; 30	7.8; 3	18.4; 16	1.5; 0	1.5; 1	6.7; 1	–	–	0.8
ElectoPanel/Electomanía	13–16 May 2019	?	?	28.9; 27	29.9; 29	8.5; 4	19.1; 16	2.0; 0	1.4; 1	8.4; 4	–	–	1.0
ElectoPanel/Electomanía	10–13 May 2019	?	?	28.9; 27	29.0; 28	8.5; 3	19.1; 16	2.0; 0	1.4; 1	9.0; 6	–	–	0.1
ElectoPanel/Electomanía	7–10 May 2019	?	?	28.1; 25	28.8; 28	8.2; 3	19.3; 16	2.1; 0	1.4; 1	9.6; 8	–	–	0.7
ElectoPanel/Electomanía	4–7 May 2019	?	?	28.0; 25	29.0; 28	8.1; 3	19.5; 16	2.1; 0	1.4; 1	9.8; 8	–	–	1.0
ElectoPanel/Electomanía	29 Apr–4 May 2019	?	?	27.9; 25	29.1; 29	7.9; 3	20.0; 17	2.3; 0	1.3; 1	9.3; 6	–	–	1.2
April 2019 general election	28 Apr 2019	—N/a	72.9	26.0 (24)	29.8 (28)	(Note: Within Unidas Podemos.)	18.9 (14)		–	12.3 (9)	10.4 (6)	–	3.8
CIS	21 Mar–23 Apr 2019	1,597	?	30.4; 28/29	32.9; 30/31	11.3; 8	13.9; 10/13	3.8; 0/1	? 0/1	3.8; 0/1	–	–	2.5
ElectoPanel/Electomanía	31 Mar–7 Apr 2019	?	?	28.8; 27	29.0; 28	7.1; 3	12.8; 9	2.2; 0	1.2; 1	14.1; 13	–	–	0.2
ElectoPanel/Electomanía	24–31 Mar 2019	?	?	28.0; 27	29.1; 27	7.0; 3	12.9; 11	2.1; 0	1.1; 0	14.5; 13	–	–	1.1
ElectoPanel/Electomanía	17–24 Mar 2019	?	?	28.0; 27	30.8; 30	6.4; 2	11.6; 8	2.2; 0	1.3; 1	14.8; 13	–	–	2.8
ElectoPanel/Electomanía	10–17 Mar 2019	?	?	28.0; 26	29.4; 30	6.2; 2	11.2; 7	2.1; 0	1.2; 1	16.8; 15	–	–	1.4
ElectoPanel/Electomanía	3–10 Mar 2019	?	?	27.3; 25	29.1; 28		12.4; 9		1.2; 1	16.6; 15	8.4; 3	–	1.8
ElectoPanel/Electomanía	22 Feb–3 Mar 2019	?	?	26.7; 24	29.2; 28		12.2; 9		1.3; 1	16.9; 16	8.5; 3	–	2.5
Sigma Dos/Ical	5–12 Feb 2019	2,700	?	32.6; 31/35	27.4; 26/28	7.1; 3	15.5; 10/13	3.3; 0/1	1.3; 0/1	9.6; 6	–	–	5.2
ElectoPanel/Electomanía	7–18 Jan 2019	740	?	26.8; 27	25.8; 24		14.2; 13		1.3; 1	14.9; 13	8.9; 3	–	1.0
PSOE	17 Jan 2019	?	?	26.0; 24	29.0; 29		12.5; 11		–	16.0; 14	7.0; 3	–	3.0
Sigma Dos/Ical	25–29 Jun 2018	2,200	?	33.0; 31/32	29.3; 25/26		22.0; 17		0.9; 0	–	10.6; 6/8	–	3.7
ElectoPanel/Electomanía	3–7 Jun 2018	?	?	32.1; 32	27.9; 26		17.6; 14		1.4; 1	–	16.0; 11	–	4.2
SyM Consulting	19–22 Mar 2018	5,500	65.5	35.6; 32/37	25.5; 22/29	6.2; 2/3	18.1; 14/18	6.0; 2/3	1.1; 0/1	–	–	–	10.1
2016 general election	26 Jun 2016	—N/a	68.8	44.3 (42)	23.1 (20)		14.2 (10)		0.2 (0)	0.2 (0)	15.6 (12)	–	21.2
2015 general election	20 Dec 2015	—N/a	72.2	39.1 (37)	22.5 (20)	15.1 (12)	15.4 (14)	4.6 (1)	–	0.3 (0)	–	–	16.6
2015 regional election	24 May 2015	—N/a	64.9	37.7; 42	25.9; 25	12.1; 10	10.3; 5	4.1; 1	1.4; 1	0.7; 0	–	–	11.8

=== Voting preferences ===
The table below lists raw, unweighted voting preferences.

Polling firm/Commissioner	Fieldwork date	Sample size	PP	PSOE	Podemos	Cs	IUCyL	UPL	Vox	Unidas Podemos	XAV	Question	X mark	Lead
2019 regional election (Note: Does not include non-resident citizens.)	26 May 2019	—N/a	22.1	24.4	3.5	10.5	1.6	1.4	3.8	–	0.5	—N/a	29.2	2.3
April 2019 general election	28 Apr 2019	—N/a	20.1	23.0		14.6		–	9.5	8.0	–	—N/a	21.8	2.9
CIS	21 Mar–23 Apr 2019	1,597	18.1	19.9	3.8	5.6	1.4	–	2.1	–	–	36.0	10.8	1.8
2016 general election	26 Jun 2016	—N/a	32.1	16.8		10.3		0.1	0.1	11.2	–	—N/a	26.7	15.3
2015 general election	20 Dec 2015	—N/a	29.4	16.9	11.3	11.5	3.4	–	0.2	–	–	—N/a	24.1	12.5
2015 regional election	24 May 2015	—N/a	25.5	17.5	8.2	6.9	2.8	1.0	0.5	–	–	—N/a	31.0	8.0

== Results ==
=== Overall ===
← Summary of the 26 May 2019 Cortes of Castile and León election results →
Parties and alliances	Popular vote			Seats	
Parties and alliances	Votes	%	±pp	Total	+/−
Spanish Socialist Workers' Party (PSOE)	479,916	34.84	+8.90	35	+10
People's Party (PP)	433,905	31.50	−6.23	29	−13
Citizens–Party of the Citizenry (Cs)	205,855	14.94	+4.67	12	+7
Vox (Vox)	75,731	5.50	+4.82	1	+1
We Can–Equo (Podemos–Equo)	68,869	5.00	−7.14	2	−8
United Left–Anticapitalists (IU–Anticapitalistas–PCAS/TC–ALTER)^{1}	31,580	2.29	−1.86	0	−1
Leonese People's Union (UPL)^{2}	28,057	2.04	+0.49	1	±0
For Ávila (XAV)	9,455	0.69	New	1	+1
Animalist Party Against Mistreatment of Animals (PACMA)	8,619	0.63	+0.10	0	±0
Sorian People's Platform (PPSO)	3,895	0.28	New	0	±0
Coalition for El Bierzo (CB)	3,725	0.27	−0.10	0	±0
Decide Now (Ahora Decide)^{3}	1,911	0.14	−0.20	0	±0
Regionalist Party of El Bierzo (PRB)	1,602	0.12	+0.07	0	±0
Regionalist Party of the Leonese Country (PREPAL)	1,403	0.10	±0.00	0	±0
With You, We Are Democracy (Contigo)	1,287	0.09	New	0	±0
Social Unity of Bierzo Electors (USE Bierzo)	1,259	0.09	New	0	±0
Communist Party of the Workers of Spain (PCTE)	1,001	0.07	New	0	±0
Regionalist Union of Castile and León (Unión Regionalista)^{4}	992	0.07	+0.01	0	±0
Democratic Centre Coalition (CCD)^{5}	925	0.07	−0.87	0	±0
Centered (centrados)	920	0.07	New	0	±0
Spanish Phalanx of the CNSO (FE de las JONS)	627	0.05	−0.08	0	±0
Ávila Free of Tolls (ÁvilaLP)	552	0.04	New	0	±0
Grouped Rural Citizens (CRA)	472	0.03	−0.09	0	±0
Communist Party of the Peoples of Spain (PCPE)	215	0.02	−0.08	0	±0
Tradition and Future (TyF)	191	0.01	New	0	±0
For a Fairer World (PUM+J)	148	0.01	New	0	±0
Blank ballots	14,566	1.06	−1.38		
Total	1,377,678			81	−3
Valid votes	1,377,678	99.01	+1.08		
Invalid votes	13,824	0.99	−1.08		
Votes cast / turnout	1,391,502	65.80	+1.13		
Abstentions	723,309	34.20	−1.13		
Registered voters	2,114,811				
Sources
Footnotes: ^{1} United Left–Anticapitalists results are compared to the combined totals of United Left–Equo: Convergence for Castile and León and Castilian Party–Commoners' Land: Pact in the 2015 election.; ^{2} Leonese People's Union results are compared to the combined totals of Leonese People's Union and Leonese Autonomist Party–Leonesist Unity in the 2015 election.; ^{3} Decide Now results are compared to the combined totals of Zamoran Independent Electors and Decide Now–Socialist Alternative in the 2015 election.; ^{4} Regionalist Union of Castile and León results are compared to Regionalist Democracy of Castile and León totals in the 2015 election.; ^{5} Democratic Centre Coalition results are compared to Independent Candidacy–Citizens of Democratic Centre totals in the 2015 election.

Popular vote
PSOE	34.84%
PP	31.50%
Cs	14.94%
Vox	5.50%
Podemos–Equo	5.00%
IU–Anticapitalists	2.29%
UPL	2.04%
XAV	0.69%
Others	2.16%
Blank ballots	1.06%

Seats
PSOE	43.21%
PP	35.80%
Cs	14.81%
Podemos–Equo	2.47%
Vox	1.23%
UPL	1.23%
XAV	1.23%

=== Distribution by constituency ===
Constituency	PSOE		PP		Cs		Vox		Podemos		UPL		XAV	
Constituency	%	S	%	S	%	S	%	S	%	S	%	S	%	S
Ávila	28.3	2	36.1	3	13.0	1	5.7	−	3.9	−			9.6	1
Burgos	37.0	5	28.1	3	17.3	2	6.1	−	7.2	1				
León	35.2	6	27.4	4	11.0	1	4.2	−	5.5	1	10.2	1		
Palencia	35.9	3	34.5	3	15.1	1	5.7	−	4.6	−				
Salamanca	33.3	4	38.5	4	15.6	2	4.8	−	4.0	−	0.3	−		
Segovia	33.8	3	33.5	2	16.4	1	5.6	−	5.3	−				
Soria	40.7	3	27.6	2	11.3	−	4.3	−	5.1	−				
Valladolid	34.7	6	29.5	5	17.7	3	6.9	1	4.7	−				
Zamora	36.2	3	33.8	3	13.9	1	5.1	−	3.5	−	0.7	−		
Total	34.8	35	31.5	29	14.9	12	5.5	1	5.0	2	2.0	1	0.7	1

== Aftermath ==
=== Government formation ===
Investiture; Nomination of Alfonso Fernández Mañueco (PP)
Ballot →	9 July 2019
Required majority →	41 out of 81
Yes: • PP (29); • Cs (12)	41 / 81
No: • PSOE (35); • Podemos (2); • UPL (1)	38 / 81
Abstentions: • Vox (1); • XAV (1)	2 / 81
Absentees	0 / 81

== Bibliography ==
- Ley Orgánica 5/1985, de 19 de junio, del Régimen Electoral General (Organic Law 5/1985). Official State Gazette (in Spanish). 19 June 1985 [version as of 6 March 2019]. BOE-A-1985-11672.
- Ley 3/1987, de 30 de marzo, Electoral de Castilla y León (Law 3/1987). Official State Gazette (in Spanish). 30 March 1987 [version as of 6 July 2017]. BOE-A-1987-9475.
- Ley 3/2001, de 3 de julio, del Gobierno y de la Administración de la Comunidad de Castilla y León (Law 3/2001). Official State Gazette (in Spanish). 3 July 2001 [version as of 6 July 2017]. BOE-A-2001-14243.
- Ley Orgánica 14/2007, de 30 de noviembre, de reforma del Estatuto de Autonomía de Castilla y León (Organic Law 14/2007). Official State Gazette (in Spanish). 30 November 2007 [version as of 11 April 2011]. BOE-A-2007-20635.
- Decreto 1/2019, de 1 de abril, del Presidente de la Junta de Castilla y León, por el que se convocan elecciones a las Cortes de Castilla y León (PDF) (Decree 1/2019). Official Gazette of Castile and León (in Spanish). 1 April 2019. BOCYL-D-02042019-1.
