= Padiernos =

- municipality
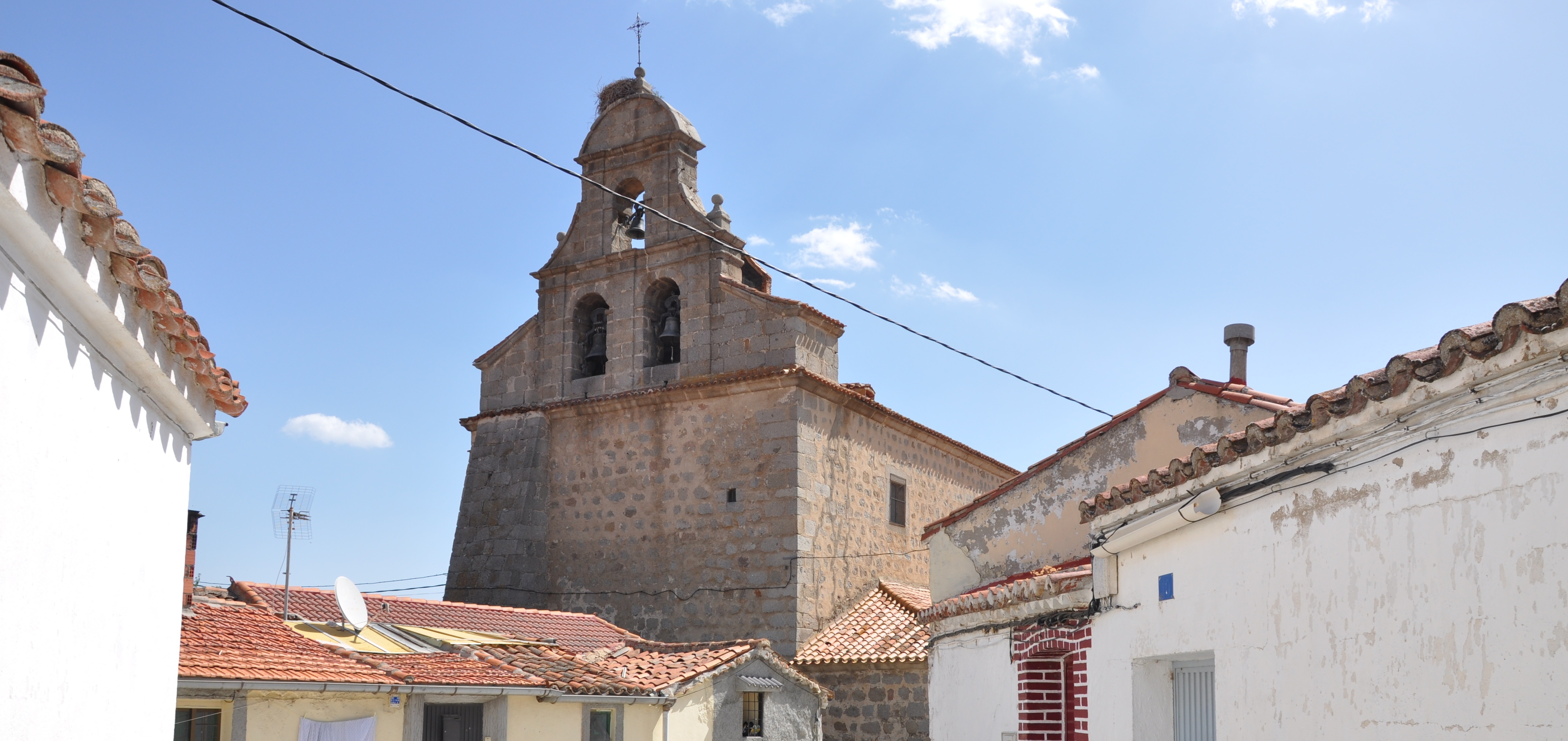
- Church of Nuestra Señora de la Asunción

- Flag Coat of arms

- Location in Spain. Padiernos (Spain)
- Coordinates: 40°37′18″N 4°50′44″W
- Country: Spain
- Autonomous community: Castile and León
- Province: Ávila

Area
  - Total: 36 km^{2} (14 sq mi)

Population (2025-01-01)
  - Total: 277
  - Density: 7.7/km^{2} (20/sq mi)
- Time zone: UTC+1 (CET)
  - Summer (DST): UTC+2 (CEST)
- Website: Official website

Padiernos is a municipality located in the province of Ávila, Castile and León, Spain.

== Population ==
Historical population
Year	Pop.	±% p.a.
2023	276	—
2024	275	−0.36%
2025	277	+0.73%
Source: INE
