= For Ávila =

For Ávila Por Ávila
- President: José Ramón Budiño
- Founded: January 2019
- Split from: People's Party
- Headquarters: Plaza Pedro Dávila, nº 8 - 2ª, 05001 Ávila
- Ideology: Regionalism; Liberalism; Localism
- Political position: Centre to centre-right
- Colours: Yellow
- Cortes of Castile and León: 1 / 7
- Provincial Deputation of Ávila: 5 / 25
- Mayors (2023-2027): 19 / 248
- Municipal councils (2023-2027): 142 / 1,272

Website
- poravila.es

For Ávila (Spanish: Por Ávila, XAV) is a regional political party in Castile and León, centered in the province of Ávila. It was formed as a split from the People's Party in January 2019 and officially registered as a political party on 18 February 2019.

== Electoral performance ==
=== Cortes of Castile and León ===
Cortes of Castile and León
Election	Leading candidate	Votes	%	Seats	Gov.
2019	Pedro Pascual	9,455	0.7 (#8)	1 / 81	No
2022	Pedro Pascual	13,875	1.1 (#9)	1 / 81	No
2026	Pedro Pascual			0 / 82	TBD

=== City Council of Ávila ===
City Council of Ávila
Election	Leading candidate	Votes	%	Seats	Gov.
2019	Jesús Manuel Sánchez Cabrera	11,223	35.1 (#1)	11 / 25	Yes
2023	Jesús Manuel Sánchez Cabrera	11,075	38.4 (#1)	11 / 25	Yes

=== Cortes Generales ===
Cortes Generales
Election	Castile and León								
Election	Congress					Senate		Leading candidate	Status in legislature
Election	Votes	%	#	Seats	+/–	Seats	+/–	Leading candidate	Status in legislature
2019 (Nov)	5,416	0.39%	7th	0 / 35	—	0 / 36	—	Gonzalo González de Vega	No seats
