= Luis Tudanca =

Spanish politician

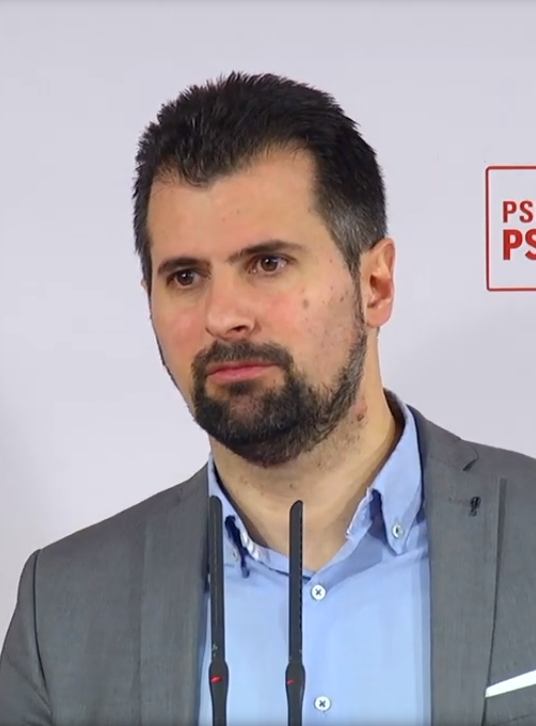

Secretary-General of the Socialist Party of Castile and León
- In office 18 October 2014 – 22 February 2025
- Preceded by: Julio Villarrubia
- Succeeded by: Carlos Martínez Mínguez

Member of the Congress of Deputies
- In office 22 April 2008 – 19 January 2015
- Constituency: Burgos

Member of the Cortes of Castile and León
- In office 16 June 2015 – 30 April 2025
- Constituency: Burgos

Member of the Senate of Spain
- Incumbent
- Assumed office 1 May 2025
- Constituency: Burgos

Personal details
- Born: 26 May 1978 (age 48) Burgos, Castile and León, Spain
- Party: PSOE
- Education: University of Burgos

Luis Tudanca Fernández (born 25 May 1978) is a Spanish Socialist Workers' Party (PSOE) politician.

He was a member of the Congress of Deputies from 2008 to 2015. From 2014 to 2025, he was Secretary General of the Socialist Party of Castile and León. From 2015 to 2025, he was the Leader of the Opposition in the Cortes of Castile and León, and was then named to the Senate of Spain.

== Biography ==
Born in Burgos, Tudanca graduated from the University of Burgos in Law, and obtained a master's degree in Consumer Law, before joining the University's board in 2000. In 2008, he was third on the PSOE's list in the province of Burgos for the 2008 general election, later moving up to second and being elected; he was the list leader three years later.

In October 2014, Tudanca became Secretary General of PSOE in Castile and León, receiving endorsements from former prime minister José Luis Rodríguez Zapatero. In the May 2015 regional election, the party came second to the People's Party (PP), with Tudanca leader of the opposition to regional president Juan Vicente Herrera.

In May 2019, Tudanca's party the most-voted for in regional elections, but the PP and Citizens formed a government and installed Alfonso Fernández Mañueco as president. Tudanca accused the two parties of running the region through their national leaders in Madrid, assisted by the far-right party Vox.

In March 2021, Tudanca tabled a motion of no confidence in Fernández Mañueco's government. The motion failed, being supported only by the PSOE and two Podemos representatives, and abstained on by minor parties. In snap elections in February 2022, the party lost seven seats and 118,000 votes. He said afterwards "Believe that others will come and will achieve the change than this land deserves".

In January 2025, Tudanca announced that he would not run for re-election as the leader of the PSOE in Castile and León, and endorsed the mayor of Soria, Carlos Martínez Mínguez, as his successor. Once elected, in April Martínez reorganised the party in the Cortes, naming Patricia Gómez as spokesperson in place of Tudanca. The party then named Tudanca as a member of the Senate of Spain, replacing Fran Díaz.
