= Soria (Cortes of Castile and León constituency) =

Coordinates: 41°40′N 2°40′W

- Cortes of Castile and León; Electoral constituency
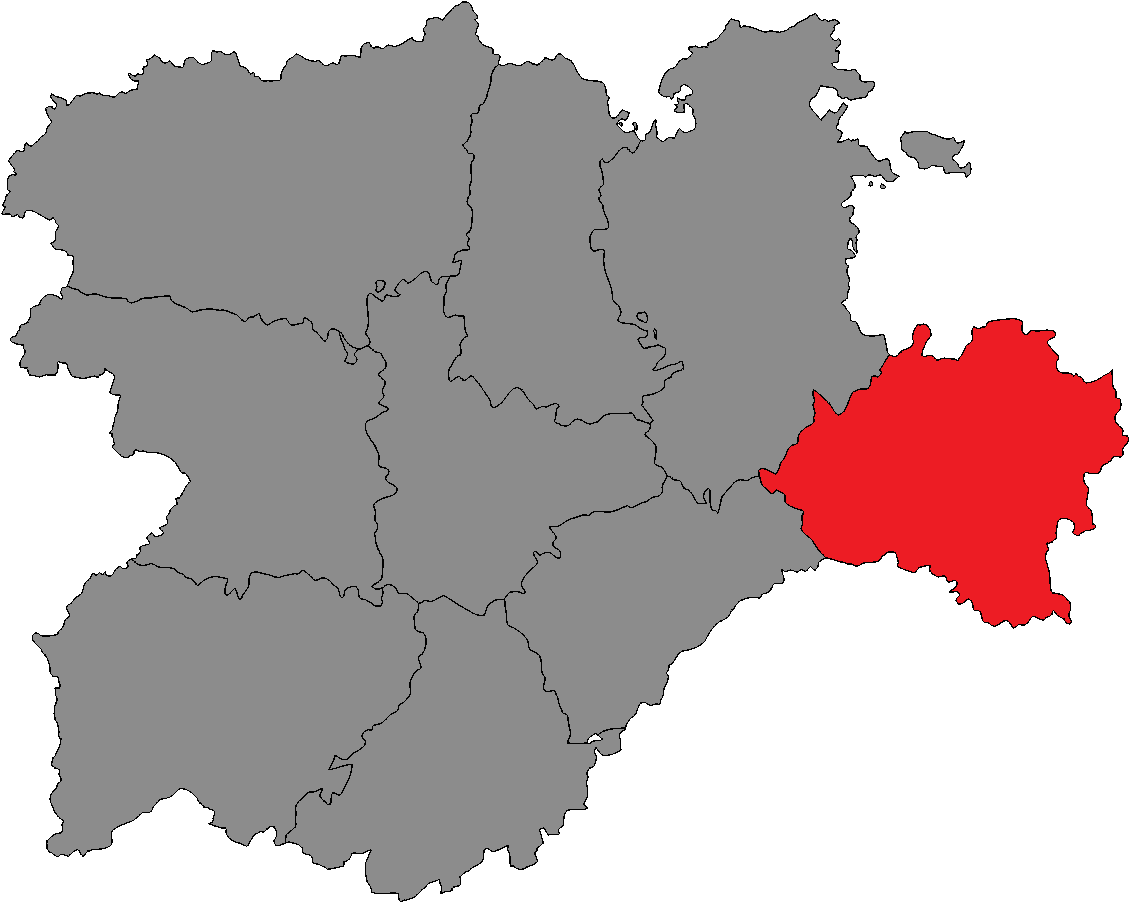
- Location of Soria within Castile and León
- Province: Soria
- Autonomous community: Castile and León
- Population: ▲90,234 (2025)
- Electorate: ▲76,573 (2026)
- Major settlements: Soria

Current constituency
- Created: 1983
- Seats: 5
- Members: PSOE (2); PP (1); SY (1); Vox (1)

Soria is one of the nine constituencies (Spanish: circunscripciones) represented in the Cortes of Castile and León, the regional legislature of the Autonomous Community of Castile and León. The constituency currently elects five deputies. Its boundaries correspond to those of the Spanish province of Soria. The electoral system uses the D'Hondt method and closed-list proportional representation, with a minimum threshold of three percent.

== Electoral system ==
The constituency was created as per the Statute of Autonomy of Castile and León of 1983 and was first contested in the 1983 regional election. The Statute provided for the nine provinces in Castile and León—Ávila, Burgos, León, Palencia, Salamanca, Segovia, Soria, Valladolid and Zamora—to be established as multi-member districts in the Cortes of Castile and León, with this regulation being maintained under the 1987 regional electoral law. Each constituency is entitled to an initial minimum of three seats, with one additional member per each 45,000 inhabitants or fraction greater than 22,500.

Voting is on the basis of universal suffrage, which comprises all nationals over eighteen, registered in Castile and León and in full enjoyment of their political rights. Amendments to the electoral law in 2011 required for Castilian-Leonese people abroad to apply for voting before being permitted to vote, a system known as "begged" or expat vote (Spanish: Voto rogado) which was abolished in 2022. Seats are elected using the D'Hondt method and a closed list proportional representation, with an electoral threshold of three percent of valid votes—which includes blank ballots—being applied in each constituency. The use of the D'Hondt method might result in a higher effective threshold, depending on the district magnitude.

The electoral law allows for parties and federations registered in the interior ministry, coalitions and groupings of electors to present lists of candidates. Parties and federations intending to form a coalition ahead of an election are required to inform the relevant Electoral Commission within ten days of the election call—fifteen before 1985—whereas groupings of electors need to secure the signature of at least one percent of the electorate in the constituencies for which they seek election—one-thousandth of the electorate, with a compulsory minimum of 500 signatures, until 1985—disallowing electors from signing for more than one list of candidates.

== Procurators ==
Procurators 1983–present
Key to parties PSOE SY CDS PP CP AP Vox
| Cortes | Election | Distribution |
| 1st | 1983 | 2 / 3 |
| 2nd | 1987 | 2 / 1 / 2 |
| 3rd | 1991 | 2 / 3 |
| 4th | 1995 | 1 / 4 |
| 5th | 1999 | 2 / 3 |
| 6th | 2003 | 2 / 3 |
| 7th | 2007 | 2 / 3 |
| 8th | 2011 | 2 / 3 |
| 9th | 2015 | 2 / 3 |
| 10th | 2019 | 3 / 2 |
| 11th | 2022 | 1 / 3 / 1 |
| 12th | 2026 | 2 / 1 / 1 / 1 |

== Regional elections ==
=== 2026 ===
Summary of the 15 March 2026 Cortes of Castile and León election results in Soria
| Parties and alliances | Popular vote | | | Seats | |
| Parties and alliances | Votes | % | ±pp | Total | +/− |
|---|---|---|---|---|---|
| Spanish Socialist Workers' Party (PSOE) | 14,766 | 32.18 | +14.12 | 2 | +1 |
| People's Party (PP) | 13,114 | 28.58 | +4.73 | 1 | ±0 |
| Soria Now! (SY) | 9,145 | 19.93 | −22.79 | 1 | −2 |
| Vox (Vox) | 7,264 | 15.83 | +4.36 | 1 | +1 |
| The Party is Over (SALF) | 378 | 0.82 | New | 0 | ±0 |
| United Left, Unite Movement, Greens Equo: In Common (IU–MS–VQ)^{1} | 256 | 0.56 | n/a | 0 | ±0 |
| We Can–Green Alliance CyL 2026 (Podemos–AV)^{1} | 252 | 0.55 | n/a | 0 | ±0 |
| Blank Seats to Leave Empty Seats (EB) | 94 | 0.20 | New | 0 | ±0 |
| Nine Castile and León (NueveCyL) | 74 | 0.16 | New | 0 | ±0 |
| Animalist Party with the Environment (PACMA)^{2} | 71 | 0.15 | −0.05 | 0 | ±0 |
| Citizens–Party of the Citizenry (Cs) | 49 | 0.11 | −0.66 | 0 | ±0 |
| Castilian Party–Commoners' Land (PCAS–TC) | 44 | 0.10 | +0.01 | 0 | ±0 |
| Blank ballots | 379 | 0.83 | +0.32 | | |
| Total | 45,886 | | | 5 | ±0 |
| Valid votes | 45,886 | 99.23 | −0.25 | | |
| Invalid votes | 354 | 0.77 | +0.25 | | |
| Votes cast / turnout | 46,240 | 60.39 | +0.58 | | |
| Abstentions | 30,335 | 39.61 | −0.58 | | |
| Registered voters | 76,575 | | | | |
Sources
Footnotes: ^{1} Within the United We Can Castile and León alliance in the 2022 election.; ^{2} Animalist Party with the Environment results are compared to Animalist Party Against Mistreatment of Animals totals in the 2022 election.

=== 2022 ===
Summary of the 13 February 2022 Cortes of Castile and León election results in Soria
| Parties and alliances | Popular vote | | | Seats | |
| Parties and alliances | Votes | % | ±pp | Total | +/− |
|---|---|---|---|---|---|
| Soria Now! (SY) | 19,385 | 42.72 | New | 3 | +3 |
| People's Party (PP) | 10,822 | 23.85 | –3.77 | 1 | –1 |
| Spanish Socialist Workers' Party (PSOE) | 8,193 | 18.06 | –22.67 | 1 | –2 |
| Vox (Vox) | 5,204 | 11.47 | +7.20 | 0 | ±0 |
| United We Can Castile and León (Podemos–IU–AV)^{1} | 1,020 | 2.25 | –4.00 | 0 | ±0 |
| Citizens–Party of the Citizenry (Cs) | 351 | 0.77 | –10.50 | 0 | ±0 |
| Animalist Party Against Mistreatment of Animals (PACMA) | 89 | 0.20 | –0.30 | 0 | ±0 |
| Castilian Party–Commoners' Land–Zero Cuts (PCAS–TC–RC) | 41 | 0.09 | New | 0 | ±0 |
| Progress Party of Castile and León Cities (PPCCAL) | 23 | 0.05 | New | 0 | ±0 |
| For a Fairer World (PUM+J) | 13 | 0.03 | New | 0 | ±0 |
| Blank ballots | 232 | 0.51 | –0.84 | | |
| Total | 45,373 | | | 5 | ±0 |
| Valid votes | 45,373 | 99.48 | +0.54 | | |
| Invalid votes | 239 | 0.52 | –0.54 | | |
| Votes cast / turnout | 45,612 | 59.81 | –4.12 | | |
| Abstentions | 30,645 | 40.19 | +4.12 | | |
| Registered voters | 76,257 | | | | |
Sources
Footnotes: ^{1} United We Can Castile and León results are compared to the combined totals of We Can–Equo and United Left–Anticapitalists in the 2019 election.

=== 2019 ===
Summary of the 26 May 2019 Cortes of Castile and León election results in Soria
| Parties and alliances | Popular vote | | | Seats | |
| Parties and alliances | Votes | % | ±pp | Total | +/− |
|---|---|---|---|---|---|
| Spanish Socialist Workers' Party (PSOE) | 19,794 | 40.73 | +9.56 | 3 | +1 |
| People's Party (PP) | 13,423 | 27.62 | –9.23 | 2 | –1 |
| Citizens–Party of the Citizenry (Cs) | 5,476 | 11.27 | –0.87 | 0 | ±0 |
| Sorian People's Platform (PPSO) | 3,895 | 8.01 | New | 0 | ±0 |
| We Can–Equo (Podemos–Equo) | 2,464 | 5.07 | –6.94 | 0 | ±0 |
| Vox (Vox) | 2,075 | 4.27 | New | 0 | ±0 |
| United Left–Anticapitalists (IU–Anticapitalistas–PCAS/TC–ALTER)^{1} | 575 | 1.18 | –2.23 | 0 | ±0 |
| Animalist Party Against Mistreatment of Animals (PACMA) | 244 | 0.50 | New | 0 | ±0 |
| Blank ballots | 657 | 1.35 | –2.12 | | |
| Total | 48,603 | | | 5 | ±0 |
| Valid votes | 48,603 | 98.94 | +1.44 | | |
| Invalid votes | 519 | 1.06 | –1.44 | | |
| Votes cast / turnout | 49,122 | 63.93 | +0.19 | | |
| Abstentions | 27,716 | 36.07 | –0.19 | | |
| Registered voters | 76,838 | | | | |
Sources
Footnotes: ^{1} United Left–Anticapitalists results are compared to the combined totals of United Left–Equo: Convergence for Castile and León and Castilian Party–Commoners' Land: Pact in the 2015 election.; ^{2} Regionalist Union of Castile and León results are compared to Regionalist Democracy of Castile and León totals in the 2015 election.; ^{3} Democratic Centre Coalition results are compared to Independent Candidacy–Citizens of Democratic Centre totals in the 2015 election.

=== 2015 ===
Summary of the 24 May 2015 Cortes of Castile and León election results in Soria
| Parties and alliances | Popular vote | | | Seats | |
| Parties and alliances | Votes | % | ±pp | Total | +/− |
|---|---|---|---|---|---|
| People's Party (PP) | 17,712 | 36.85 | –15.16 | 3 | ±0 |
| Spanish Socialist Workers' Party (PSOE) | 14,978 | 31.17 | –1.76 | 2 | ±0 |
| Citizens–Party of the Citizenry (C's) | 5,834 | 12.14 | New | 0 | ±0 |
| We Can (Podemos) | 5,772 | 12.01 | New | 0 | ±0 |
| United Left–Equo: Convergence for Castile and León (IU–Equo) | 1,368 | 2.85 | –0.25 | 0 | ±0 |
| Union, Progress and Democracy (UPyD) | 460 | 0.96 | New | 0 | ±0 |
| Castilian Party–Commoners' Land: Pact (PCAS–TC–Pacto) | 270 | 0.56 | –0.08 | 0 | ±0 |
| Blank ballots | 1,666 | 3.47 | –1.66 | | |
| Total | 48,060 | | | 5 | ±0 |
| Valid votes | 48,060 | 97.50 | –0.20 | | |
| Invalid votes | 1,234 | 2.50 | +0.20 | | |
| Votes cast / turnout | 49,294 | 63.74 | –3.20 | | |
| Abstentions | 28,042 | 36.26 | +3.20 | | |
| Registered voters | 77,336 | | | | |

=== 2011 ===
Summary of the 22 May 2011 Cortes of Castile and León election results in Soria
| Parties and alliances | Popular vote | | | Seats | |
| Parties and alliances | Votes | % | ±pp | Total | +/− |
|---|---|---|---|---|---|
| People's Party (PP) | 26,264 | 52.01 | +1.64 | 3 | ±0 |
| Spanish Socialist Workers' Party (PSOE) | 16,630 | 32.93 | –3.76 | 2 | ±0 |
| Initiative for the Development of Soria (IDES) | 2,680 | 5.31 | –1.68 | 0 | ±0 |
| United Left of Castile and León (IUCyL) | 1,565 | 3.10 | +1.40 | 0 | ±0 |
| Party of Castile and León (PCAL)^{1} | 323 | 0.64 | +0.20 | 0 | ±0 |
| Anti-Bullfighting Party Against Mistreatment of Animals (PACMA) | 256 | 0.51 | New | 0 | ±0 |
| Communist Unification of Spain (UCE) | 187 | 0.37 | New | 0 | ±0 |
| Blank ballots | 2,590 | 5.13 | +2.36 | | |
| Total | 50,495 | | | 5 | ±0 |
| Valid votes | 50,495 | 97.70 | –1.26 | | |
| Invalid votes | 1,189 | 2.30 | +1.26 | | |
| Votes cast / turnout | 51,684 | 66.94 | –3.05 | | |
| Abstentions | 25,523 | 33.06 | +3.05 | | |
| Registered voters | 77,207 | | | | |
Sources
Footnotes: ^{1} Party of Castile and León results are compared to Commoners' Land–Alternative for Castile and León totals in the 2007 election.

=== 2007 ===
Summary of the 27 May 2007 Cortes of Castile and León election results in Soria
| Parties and alliances | Popular vote | | | Seats | |
| Parties and alliances | Votes | % | ±pp | Total | +/− |
|---|---|---|---|---|---|
| People's Party (PP) | 27,078 | 50.37 | –3.00 | 3 | ±0 |
| Spanish Socialist Workers' Party (PSOE) | 19,727 | 36.69 | +0.07 | 2 | ±0 |
| Initiative for the Development of Soria (IDES) | 3,760 | 6.99 | +3.54 | 0 | ±0 |
| United Left–The Greens–Commitment for Castile and León (IU–LV–CyL) | 912 | 1.70 | –0.39 | 0 | ±0 |
| The Greens (LV) | 352 | 0.65 | New | 0 | ±0 |
| Commoners' Land–Alternative for Castile and León (TC–ACAL) | 235 | 0.44 | –0.11 | 0 | ±0 |
| Republican Left (IR) | 209 | 0.39 | +0.10 | 0 | ±0 |
| Blank ballots | 1,489 | 2.77 | –0.60 | | |
| Total | 53,762 | | | 5 | ±0 |
| Valid votes | 53,762 | 98.96 | +0.19 | | |
| Invalid votes | 565 | 1.04 | –0.19 | | |
| Votes cast / turnout | 54,327 | 69.99 | –1.54 | | |
| Abstentions | 23,289 | 30.01 | +1.54 | | |
| Registered voters | 77,616 | | | | |

=== 2003 ===
Summary of the 25 May 2003 Cortes of Castile and León election results in Soria
| Parties and alliances | Popular vote | | | Seats | |
| Parties and alliances | Votes | % | ±pp | Total | +/− |
|---|---|---|---|---|---|
| People's Party (PP) | 29,534 | 53.37 | –3.33 | 3 | ±0 |
| Spanish Socialist Workers' Party (PSOE) | 20,265 | 36.62 | +4.56 | 2 | ±0 |
| Initiative for the Development of Soria (IDES) | 1,908 | 3.45 | New | 0 | ±0 |
| United Left of Castile and León (IUCyL) | 1,155 | 2.09 | –3.74 | 0 | ±0 |
| Commoners' Land–Castilian Nationalist Party (TC–PNC) | 306 | 0.55 | –0.29 | 0 | ±0 |
| Republican Left (IR) | 162 | 0.29 | New | 0 | ±0 |
| Castilian Left (IzCa) | 142 | 0.26 | New | 0 | ±0 |
| Blank ballots | 1,864 | 3.37 | –0.50 | | |
| Total | 55,336 | | | 5 | ±0 |
| Valid votes | 55,336 | 98.77 | +0.10 | | |
| Invalid votes | 689 | 1.23 | –0.10 | | |
| Votes cast / turnout | 56,025 | 71.53 | +7.14 | | |
| Abstentions | 22,304 | 28.47 | –7.14 | | |
| Registered voters | 78,329 | | | | |

=== 1999 ===
Summary of the 13 June 1999 Cortes of Castile and León election results in Soria
| Parties and alliances | Popular vote | | | Seats | |
| Parties and alliances | Votes | % | ±pp | Total | +/− |
|---|---|---|---|---|---|
| People's Party (PP) | 28,701 | 56.70 | –2.51 | 3 | –1 |
| Spanish Socialist Workers' Party (PSOE) | 16,227 | 32.06 | +3.71 | 2 | +1 |
| United Left of Castile and León (IUCyL) | 2,949 | 5.83 | –2.33 | 0 | ±0 |
| Commoners' Land–Castilian Nationalist Party (TC–PNC) | 424 | 0.84 | +0.35 | 0 | ±0 |
| Regionalist Unity of Castile and León (URCL) | 362 | 0.72 | New | 0 | ±0 |
| Blank ballots | 1,957 | 3.87 | +1.05 | | |
| Total | 50,620 | | | 5 | ±0 |
| Valid votes | 50,620 | 98.67 | –0.16 | | |
| Invalid votes | 684 | 1.33 | +0.16 | | |
| Votes cast / turnout | 51,304 | 64.39 | –4.96 | | |
| Abstentions | 28,373 | 35.61 | +4.96 | | |
| Registered voters | 79,677 | | | | |

=== 1995 ===
Summary of the 28 May 1995 Cortes of Castile and León election results in Soria
| Parties and alliances | Popular vote | | | Seats | |
| Parties and alliances | Votes | % | ±pp | Total | +/− |
|---|---|---|---|---|---|
| People's Party (PP) | 32,089 | 59.21 | +6.94 | 4 | +1 |
| Spanish Socialist Workers' Party (PSOE) | 15,361 | 28.35 | –5.54 | 1 | –1 |
| United Left of Castile and León (IU) | 4,422 | 8.16 | +5.48 | 0 | ±0 |
| Sorian Progressive Union (US) | 417 | 0.77 | New | 0 | ±0 |
| Commoners' Land–Castilian Nationalist Party (TC–PNC) | 264 | 0.49 | +0.10 | 0 | ±0 |
| Party of El Bierzo (PB) | 110 | 0.20 | New | 0 | ±0 |
| Blank ballots | 1,529 | 2.82 | +1.04 | | |
| Total | 54,192 | | | 5 | ±0 |
| Valid votes | 54,192 | 98.83 | –0.45 | | |
| Invalid votes | 643 | 1.17 | +0.45 | | |
| Votes cast / turnout | 54,835 | 69.35 | +3.97 | | |
| Abstentions | 24,235 | 30.65 | –3.97 | | |
| Registered voters | 79,070 | | | | |

=== 1991 ===
Summary of the 26 May 1991 Cortes of Castile and León election results in Soria
| Parties and alliances | Popular vote | | | Seats | |
| Parties and alliances | Votes | % | ±pp | Total | +/− |
|---|---|---|---|---|---|
| People's Party (PP)^{1} | 26,977 | 52.27 | +5.03 | 3 | +1 |
| Spanish Socialist Workers' Party (PSOE) | 17,492 | 33.89 | +1.55 | 2 | ±0 |
| Democratic and Social Centre (CDS) | 3,302 | 6.40 | –7.94 | 0 | –1 |
| United Left (IU) | 1,385 | 2.68 | ±0.00 | 0 | ±0 |
| Castilianist Union (UC) | 528 | 1.02 | New | 0 | ±0 |
| The Greens (LV) | 511 | 0.99 | New | 0 | ±0 |
| Nationalist Party of Castile and León (PANCAL) | 298 | 0.58 | –0.14 | 0 | ±0 |
| Commoners' Land (TC) | 201 | 0.39 | New | 0 | ±0 |
| Blank ballots | 917 | 1.78 | –0.21 | | |
| Total | 51,611 | | | 5 | ±0 |
| Valid votes | 51,611 | 99.28 | +2.10 | | |
| Invalid votes | 373 | 0.72 | –2.10 | | |
| Votes cast / turnout | 51,984 | 65.38 | –5.51 | | |
| Abstentions | 27,529 | 34.62 | +5.51 | | |
| Registered voters | 79,513 | | | | |
Sources
Footnotes: ^{1} People's Party results are compared to the combined totals of People's Alliance and People's Democratic Party in the 1987 election.

=== 1987 ===
Summary of the 10 June 1987 Cortes of Castile and León election results in Soria
| Parties and alliances | Popular vote | | | Seats | |
| Parties and alliances | Votes | % | ±pp | Total | +/− |
|---|---|---|---|---|---|
| People's Alliance (AP)^{1} | 22,668 | 41.75 | n/a | 2 | ±0 |
| Spanish Socialist Workers' Party (PSOE) | 17,562 | 32.34 | –6.21 | 2 | ±0 |
| Democratic and Social Centre (CDS) | 7,786 | 14.34 | +6.62 | 1 | +1 |
| People's Democratic Party (PDP)^{1} | 2,981 | 5.49 | n/a | 0 | ±0 |
| United Left (IU)^{2} | 1,454 | 2.68 | +0.70 | 0 | ±0 |
| Nationalist Party of Castile and León (PNCL–PANCAL)^{1} | 391 | 0.72 | n/a | 0 | –1 |
| Workers' Party of Spain–Communist Unity (PTE–UC) | 265 | 0.49 | New | 0 | ±0 |
| Leonesist Union (UNLE) | 116 | 0.21 | New | 0 | ±0 |
| Blank ballots | 1,078 | 1.99 | +0.80 | | |
| Total | 54,301 | | | 5 | ±0 |
| Valid votes | 54,301 | 97.18 | –0.72 | | |
| Invalid votes | 1,576 | 2.82 | +0.72 | | |
| Votes cast / turnout | 55,877 | 70.89 | +3.54 | | |
| Abstentions | 22,950 | 29.11 | –3.54 | | |
| Registered voters | 78,827 | | | | |
Sources
Footnotes: ^{1} Within the People's Coalition alliance in the 1983 election.; ^{2} United Left results are compared to Communist Party of Spain totals in the 1983 election.

=== 1983 ===
Summary of the 8 May 1983 Cortes of Castile and León election results in Soria
| Parties and alliances | Popular vote | | | Seats | |
| Parties and alliances | Votes | % | ±pp | Total | +/− |
|---|---|---|---|---|---|
| People's Coalition (AP–PDP–UL) | 23,487 | 44.23 | n/a | 3 | n/a |
| Spanish Socialist Workers' Party (PSOE) | 20,470 | 38.55 | n/a | 2 | n/a |
| Democratic and Social Centre (CDS) | 4,098 | 7.72 | n/a | 0 | n/a |
| Agrarian Bloc–Regionalist Party of the Leonese Country (BAR–PREPAL) | 3,359 | 6.33 | n/a | 0 | n/a |
| Communist Party of Castile and León (PCCL–PCE) | 1,054 | 1.98 | n/a | 0 | n/a |
| Blank ballots | 632 | 1.19 | n/a | | |
| Total | 53,100 | | | 5 | n/a |
| Valid votes | 53,100 | 97.90 | n/a | | |
| Invalid votes | 1,138 | 2.10 | n/a | | |
| Votes cast / turnout | 54,238 | 67.35 | n/a | | |
| Abstentions | 26,290 | 32.65 | n/a | | |
| Registered voters | 80,528 | | | | |
