= List of Bienes de Interés Cultural in the Province of Ávila =

This is a list of Bien de Interés Cultural landmarks in the Province of Ávila, Spain.

- Basilica of San Vicente
- Iglesia-convento de Santa Teresa
- Roman bridge of Ávila
- Walls of Ávila
- Medina Bridge
