= Ávila =

- Municipality
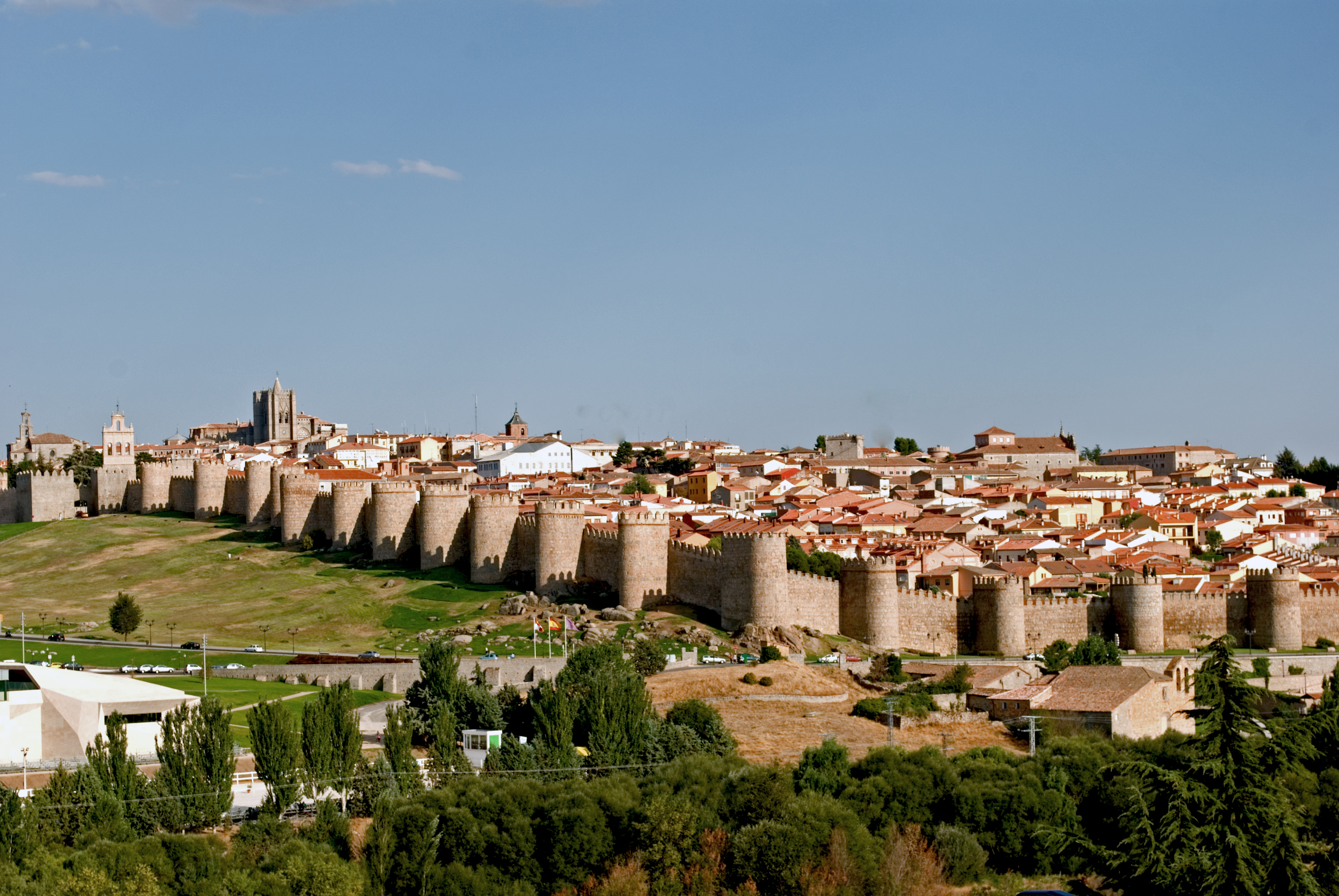
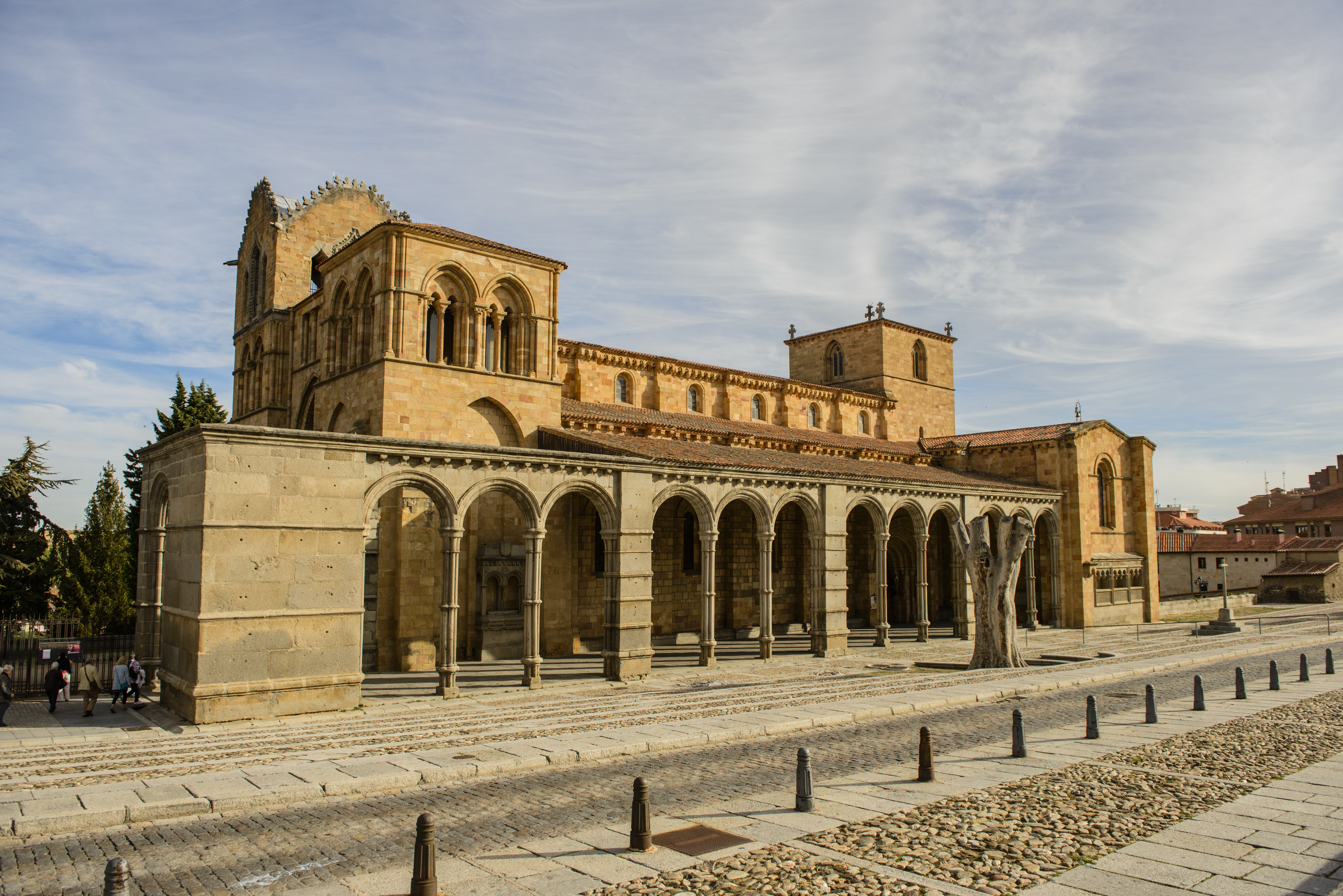
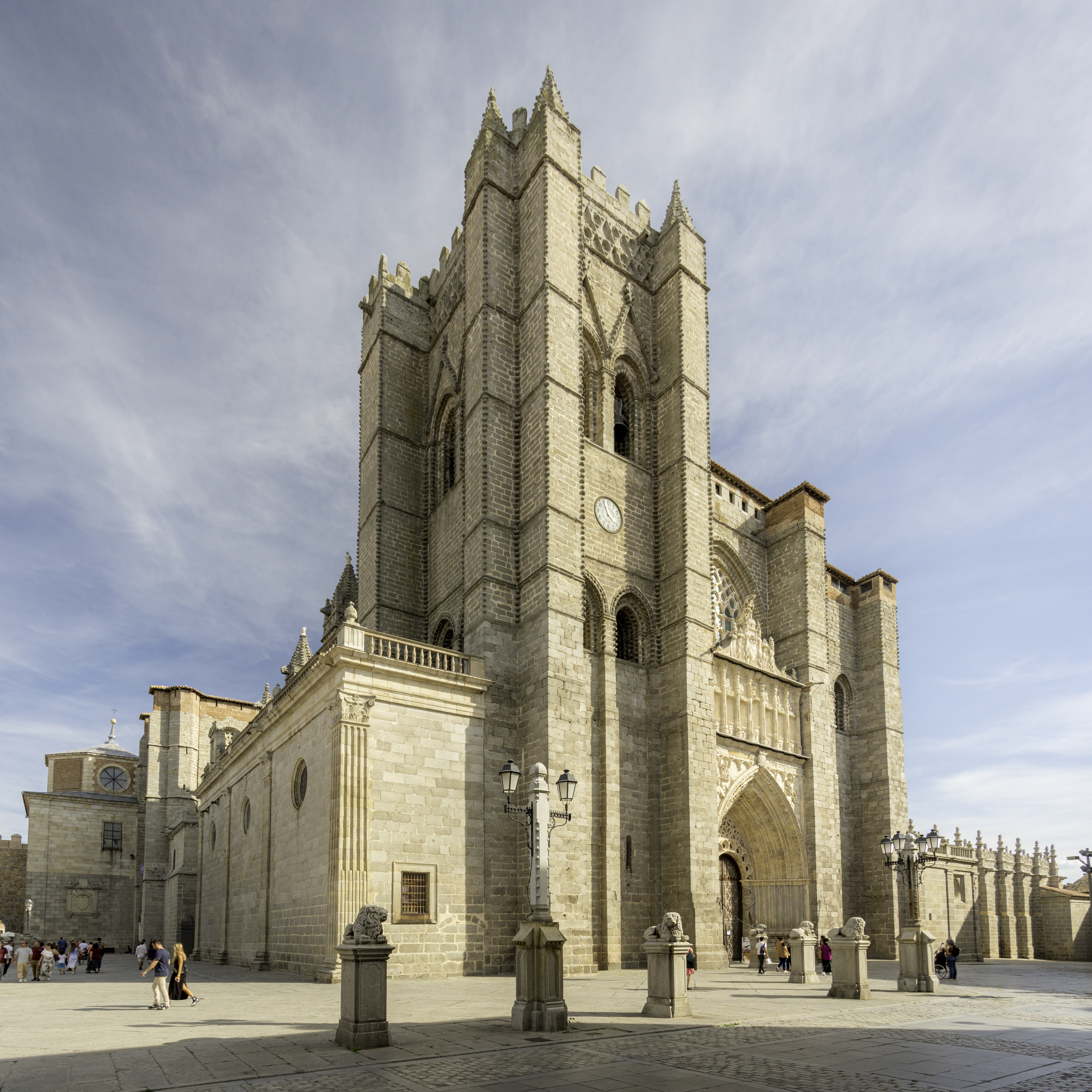
- Ávila with its town walls Basilica of San Vicente Cathedral Plaza del Mercado Chico

- Flag Coat of arms
- Nicknames: Ávila de los Caballeros (lit. 'Ávila of the Knights'); Ávila del Rey (lit. 'Ávila of the King'); Ávila de los Leales (lit. 'Ávila of the Loyal Ones') (Note: All three epithets are present in both the flag and the coat of arms of the city.)
- Motto: Una ciudad para todos lit. 'A city for everyone'
- Interactive map of Ávila
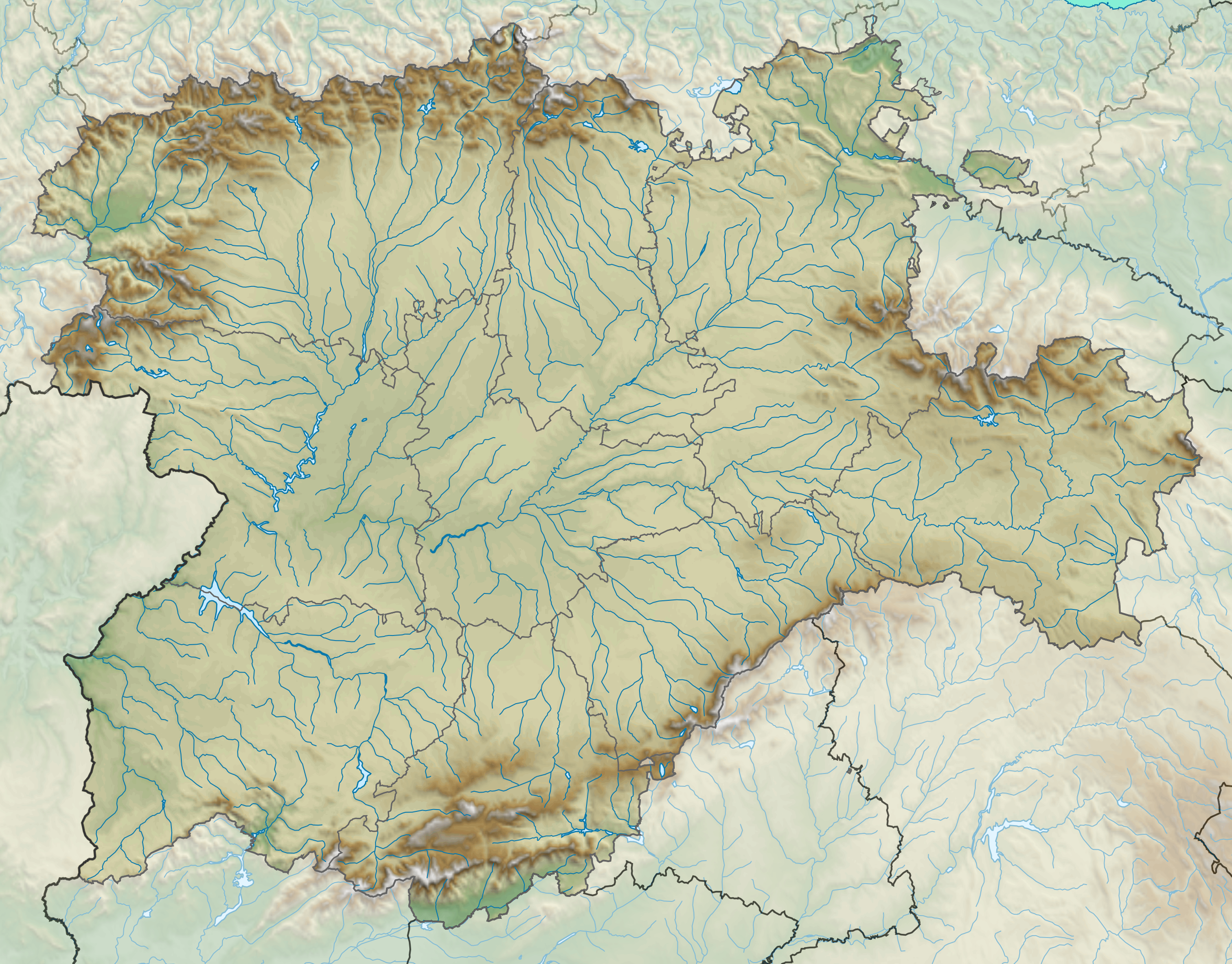
- Location within Castile and León Location within Spain
- Coordinates: 40°39′N 4°41′W
- Country: Spain
- Autonomous community: Castile and León
- Province: Ávila

Government
  - Type: Ayuntamiento
  - Body: Ayuntamiento de Ávila
  - Mayor: Jesús Manuel Sánchez Cabrera (XAV)

Area
  - Land: 231.9 km^{2} (89.5 sq mi)
- Elevation: 1,132 m (3,714 ft)

Population (2025-01-01)
  - Total: 59,107
- Demonym: Abulense(s)
- Time zone: UTC+1 (CET)
  - Summer (DST): UTC+2 (CEST)
- Postal code: 05001–05006
- Area code: +34 (ES) + 920 (AV)
- Website: https://www.avila.es (in Spanish)

UNESCO World Heritage Site
- Official name: Old Town of Ávila with its Extra-Muros Churches
- Includes: Hermitage of San Segundo, Basilica of San Vicente, Church of San Andrés, Church of San Pedro, Church of San Nicolás, Church of Santa María de la Cabeza, Church of San Martín, Convent of La Encarnación, Convent of San José, Royal Monastery of Santo Tomás
- Criteria: Cultural: iii, iv
- Reference: 348
- Inscription: 1985 (9th Session)
- Area: 36.4 ha (90 acres)

Ávila (Note: UK: /ˈævɪlə/ AV-il-ə; US: /ˈɑːvɪlə/ AHV-il-ə, /-vi-/ -vee-, /-(ˌ)lɑː/ -lah; Spanish: [ˈaβila]) is the capital and most populated municipality of the Province of Ávila, located in the autonomous community of Castile and León in Spain. Located in the centre of the Iberian Peninsula, to the north of the Sistema Central, it lies on the right bank of the Adaja and, at an elevation of over 1,130 metres (3,710 ft) above sea level, is the highest provincial capital in Spain.

While it is not a settled issue, the primitive urban core of Obila was probably founded after the Roman subjugation of the territory through the assimilation of indigenous peoples (Vettones) in connection to the Roman policy enforcing the abandonment of surrounding hilltop oppida. Medieval Christian settlement took hold in the 11th century, with the growing status of milieus associated to the council militias and the discrimination against peasantry deepening the social inequality from a relatively egalitarian starting point.

Ávila is sometimes called the "City of Stones and Saints" (Note: Spanish: Ciudad de cantos y de santos) due to its well-preserved medieval architecture and its connection to prominent Spanish mystics.

The Old Town of Ávila with its extra muros churches were declared a UNESCO World Heritage Site in 1985.

== History ==
=== Ancient Avila ===
In pre-Roman times (the 5th century BC), Ávila was inhabited by the Vettones, who called it Obila (Ὀβίλα) ("High Mountain") and built one of their strongest fortresses here. There are Bronze Age stone statues of boars (known as verracio) nearby.

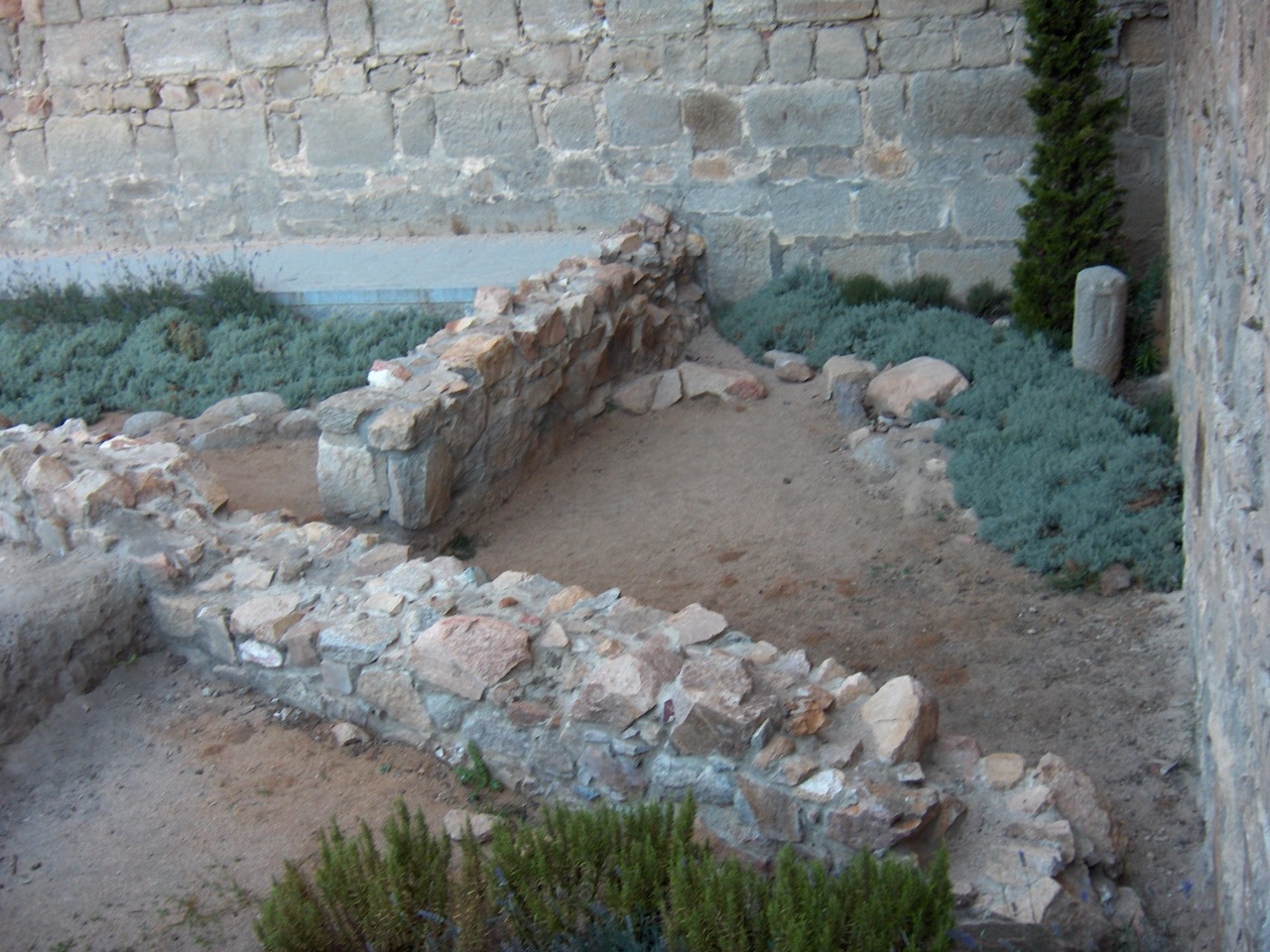
Archeological remains from the Roman era near the Gate of San Vicente

Ávila may have been the ancient town known as Abula, mentioned by Ptolemy in his Geographia (II 6, 60) as being located in the Iberian region of Bastetania. Abula is mentioned as one of the first towns in Hispania that was converted to Christianity by Secundus of Abula (San Segundo), however, Abula may alternatively have been the town of Abla.

After the conquest by ancient Rome, the town was called Abila or Abela. The plan of the town remains typically Roman; rectangular in shape, with its two main streets (cardo and decumanus) intersecting at a forum in the centre. Roman remains that are embedded in town walls at the eastern and southern entrances (now the Alcazar and Rastro Gates) appear to have been ashlar altar stones.

By tradition, in the 1st century, Secundus, having travelled via the Roman province of Hispania Baetica, brought the Gospel to Ávila, and was created its first bishop.

=== Middle Ages ===
After the fall of the Western Roman Empire, Ávila became a stronghold of the Visigoths. Conquered by the Moors (Arabs) (who called it Ābila, آبلة), it was repeatedly attacked by the northern Iberian Christian kingdoms, becoming a virtually uninhabited no man's land. It was repopulated about 1088 following the definitive reconquest of the area by Raymond of Burgundy, son in law of Alfonso VI of León and Castile. Tradition holds that he employed two foreigners, an Italian, Casandro Romano, and a Frenchman, Florin de Pontuenga, to construct a stone frontier town and creating the walls that still stand.

Ávila hosted a Jewish community in the Middle Ages. The first written evidence documenting the presence of Jews dates to 1144. By the end of the 13th century, the Jewish population in Ávila was one of the largest in Castile. In 1375, the Jews of Ávila were forced to watch a religious disputation between Juan de Valladolid and Moses ha-Kohen of Tordesillas. After the 1492 expulsion of the Jews, the Jewish community was nonexistent. Several synagogues existed in the city until the expulsion. Some of their properties were sold or auctioned in the years that followed, and in 1495 the Crown granted one of the synagogue sites to the Convent of the Incarnation on Lomo Street.

The city achieved a period of prosperity under the Catholic Monarchs in the early 16th century. During the Revolt of the Comuneros, the city became the first meeting place of the Santa junta (the Holy governing board) on 1 August 1520. The Junta of Ávila drafted the Proyecto de Ley Perpetua (a sort of proto-constitutional draft that never came into force) in the Cathedral of Ávila in the Summer of 1520, envisaging that cities assembled every three years without the requirement for royal sanction or presence, determining taxation and acting as a check and balance on government activity.

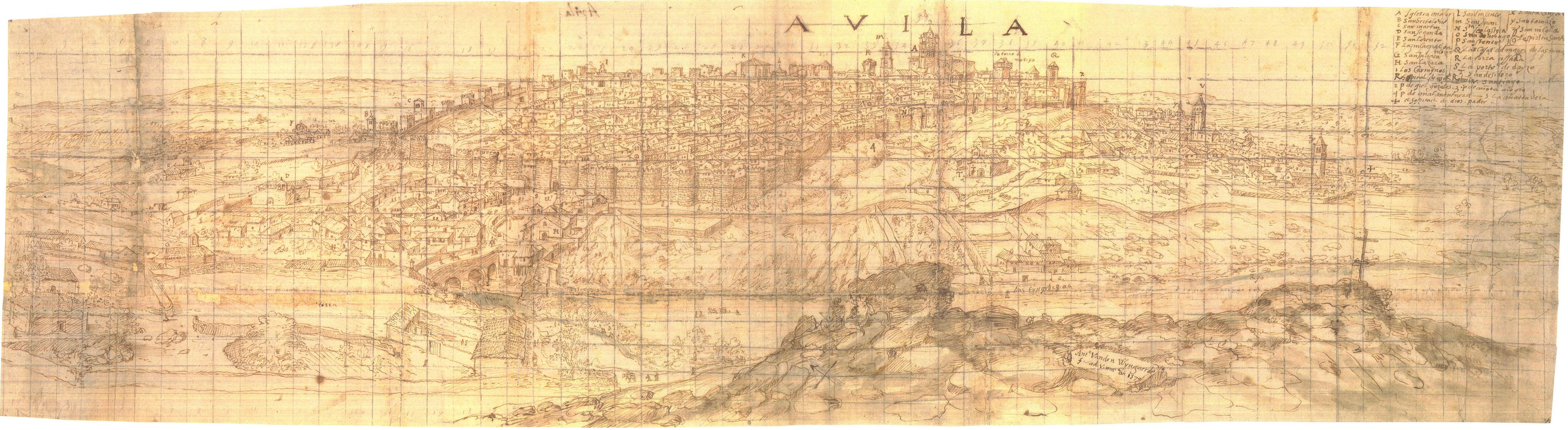
View of the city, as drawn by Anton van den Wyngaerde in 1570

=== Modern era ===
The city experienced a long decline since the 17th century, its population reducing to just 4,000 inhabitants.

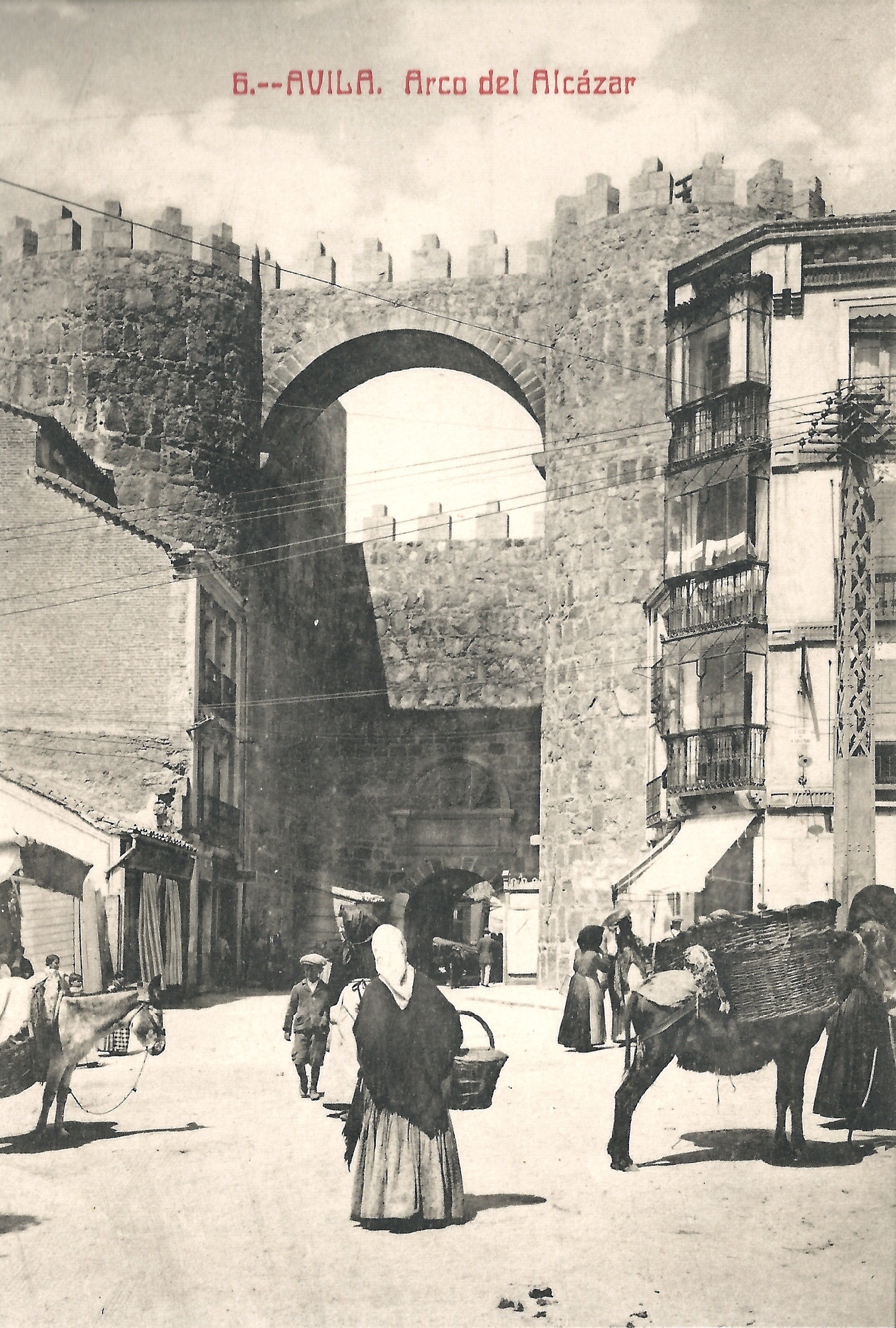
The Alcázar Gate c. 1912

In the 19th century, there was some population growth with the construction of the railway line from Madrid to the French border at Irun and an important junction near the town.

In 1936, at the outbreak of the Spanish Civil War, the town quickly became part of the area occupied by rebel troops. Growth continued slowly again under Franco, but Ávila has not had a major influence in Spanish society in recent history, apart from the nurturing of politicians such as Adolfo Suárez, the first democratically elected prime minister of Spain post-Franco, and José María Aznar, prime minister from 1996 to 2004, who represented Ávila in the Cortes but was not from the town.

== Geography ==
Situated 1132 metres (3714 feet) above sea level on a rocky outcrop on the right bank of the Adaja river, a tributary of the Duero, Ávila is the highest provincial capital in Spain. It is built on the flat summit of a rocky hill, which stands above a brown, arid, treeless table-land, strewn with grey boulders, and surrounded by lofty mountains.

=== Climate ===
Ávila's position results in a warm summer mediterranean climate (Csb, according to the Köppen climate classification) bordering on a cold semi-arid climate (BSk) with warm summers and chilly winters with snowfalls. The hottest month, July, has an average temperature of 20.6 °C (69 °F), and the coldest month, January, has an average of 3.0 °C (37 °F). The average annual precipitation is 416 mm (16.38 in). Annual rainfall is low compared to surrounding areas, implying that it lies in a rain shadow. The Adaja is dry for several months of the year and the town has historically had water supply problems. Ávila has the coldest winter low temperatures of the Spanish provincial capital cities, thanks to its high altitude (1,132 metres (3,714 ft) above sea level).

Climate data for Ávila 1,130 metres (3,710 ft) (1991-2020), extremes (1983–present)
Month	Jan	Feb	Mar	Apr	May	Jun	Jul	Aug	Sep	Oct	Nov	Dec	Year
Record high °C (°F)	20.8 (69.4)	20.8 (69.4)	24.2 (75.6)	29.3 (84.7)	33.0 (91.4)	36.9 (98.4)	37.6 (99.7)	38.8 (101.8)	36.0 (96.8)	29.9 (85.8)	22.7 (72.9)	20.2 (68.4)	38.8 (101.8)
Mean daily maximum °C (°F)	8.0 (46.4)	9.4 (48.9)	12.6 (54.7)	14.9 (58.8)	19.3 (66.7)	25.2 (77.4)	28.9 (84.0)	28.4 (83.1)	23.4 (74.1)	17.4 (63.3)	11.3 (52.3)	9.0 (48.2)	17.3 (63.2)
Daily mean °C (°F)	3.5 (38.3)	4.4 (39.9)	7.1 (44.8)	9.3 (48.7)	13.2 (55.8)	18.1 (64.6)	21.3 (70.3)	21.0 (69.8)	16.8 (62.2)	12.0 (53.6)	6.8 (44.2)	4.5 (40.1)	11.5 (52.7)
Mean daily minimum °C (°F)	−1.0 (30.2)	−0.6 (30.9)	1.5 (34.7)	3.6 (38.5)	7.2 (45.0)	11.1 (52.0)	13.6 (56.5)	13.5 (56.3)	10.1 (50.2)	6.5 (43.7)	2.2 (36.0)	0.0 (32.0)	5.6 (42.2)
Record low °C (°F)	−16.0 (3.2)	−12.0 (10.4)	−13.2 (8.2)	−8.6 (16.5)	−4.6 (23.7)	−1.0 (30.2)	1.0 (33.8)	1.4 (34.5)	−3.0 (26.6)	−5.4 (22.3)	−14.0 (6.8)	−13.4 (7.9)	−16.0 (3.2)
Average precipitation mm (inches)	32 (1.3)	26 (1.0)	29 (1.1)	40 (1.6)	51 (2.0)	25 (1.0)	12 (0.5)	17 (0.7)	29 (1.1)	56 (2.2)	47 (1.9)	35 (1.4)	399 (15.8)
Average precipitation days	5.8	5.0	5.8	7.7	8.1	4.1	1.9	2.3	4.6	7.3	7.3	6.1	66
Average snowy days	5.1	4.7	2.9	1.8	0.3	0	0	0	0	0.2	2.1	2.7	19.8
Average relative humidity (%)	78	71	64	62	57	48	41	43	54	68	78	78	62
Mean monthly sunshine hours	133	155	211	228	264	315	356	329	255	189	129	121	2,685
Source: Agencia Estatal de Meteorología

== Population ==
Historical population
Year	Pop.	±% p.a.
2023	158,407	—
2024	158,989	+0.37%
2025	159,887	+0.56%
Source: INE

== Education ==
=== Universities ===
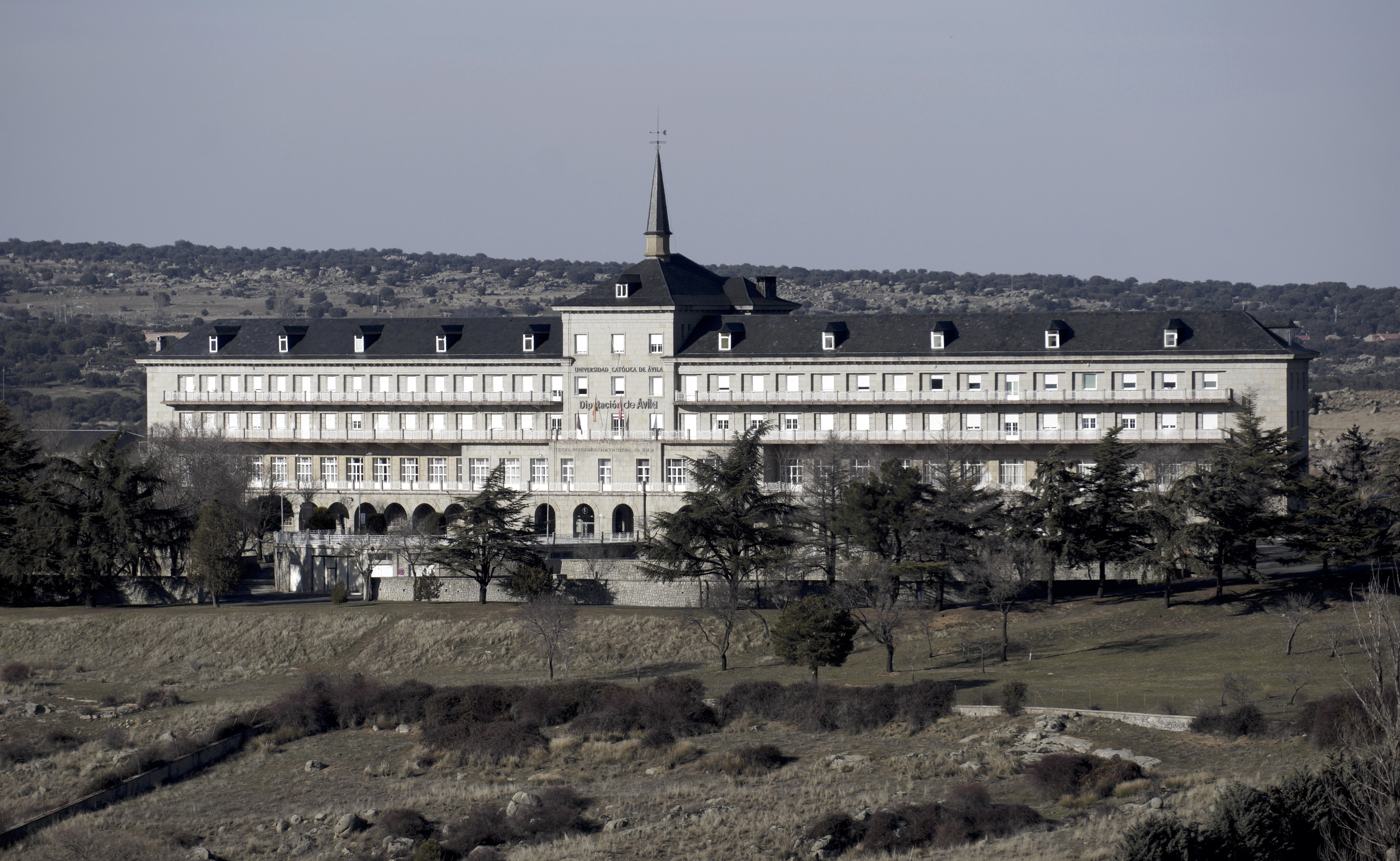
Main UCAV building.

Ávila has one university: the Catholic University of Ávila (UCAV). There are three colleges of the University of Salamanca (USAL): the Polytechnic School of Ávila, the College of Education and Tourism in Ávila, and the School of Nursing.

== Culture ==
=== Cultural image of the city ===
In his book El alma castellana (transl. The Castilian Soul), writer José Martínez Ruiz described it as "perhaps the most 16th-century town in Spain". Filmmaker Orson Welles once named Ávila as the place in which he would most desire to live, calling it a "strange, tragic place"; various scenes of his 1965 film Chimes at Midnight were filmed in the town.

=== Popular celebrations ===
The first public festival after the winter cold is Holy Week.

Ávila's other major holidays are 15 October, Santa Teresa de Jesús, and 2 May, San Segundo. The festivities take place around 15 October and the Summer Festival in mid-July.

==== Holy Week ====
Holy Week as celebrated in Ávila has garnered international tourist interest. It is one of the highest expressions of art and wealth as seen in numerous steps of Holy Week along the town walls. Processions have either fifteen or twelve fraternities.

==== Fiestas de Santa Teresa ====
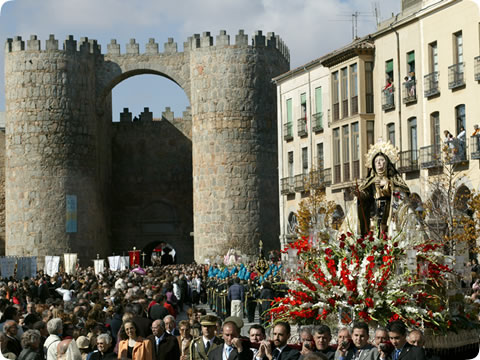
Fiestas de Santa Teresa (Procession, 2007)

The festivities of Santa Teresa, the town's most famous historical resident, a canonized Catholic saint known for her mysticism and religious writings and the first female Doctor of the Church, last almost the entire month of October. The proclamation is done by the mayor in the Plaza Mayor, accompanied by some celebrity. After the proclamation was organized in the same place a musical performance with renowned singers.

The festival program includes several musical concerts, a fairground, bullfights, passacaglia, processions of the fan groups, chocolate with churros and liturgical acts naturally focus on the day of the patroness, on 15 October with multitudinous mass presided by Bishop, then celebrated a great procession, headed the image of Santa Teresa with the Virgin of La Caridad, and is accompanied by all the authorities of Ávila, civil and military, and several bands music. The procession takes place between the Cathedral of Ávila and Santa Teresa Church. Takes place the day before the "Procession Girl" from the Iglesia de Santa Teresa to the cathedral.

=== Cuisine ===
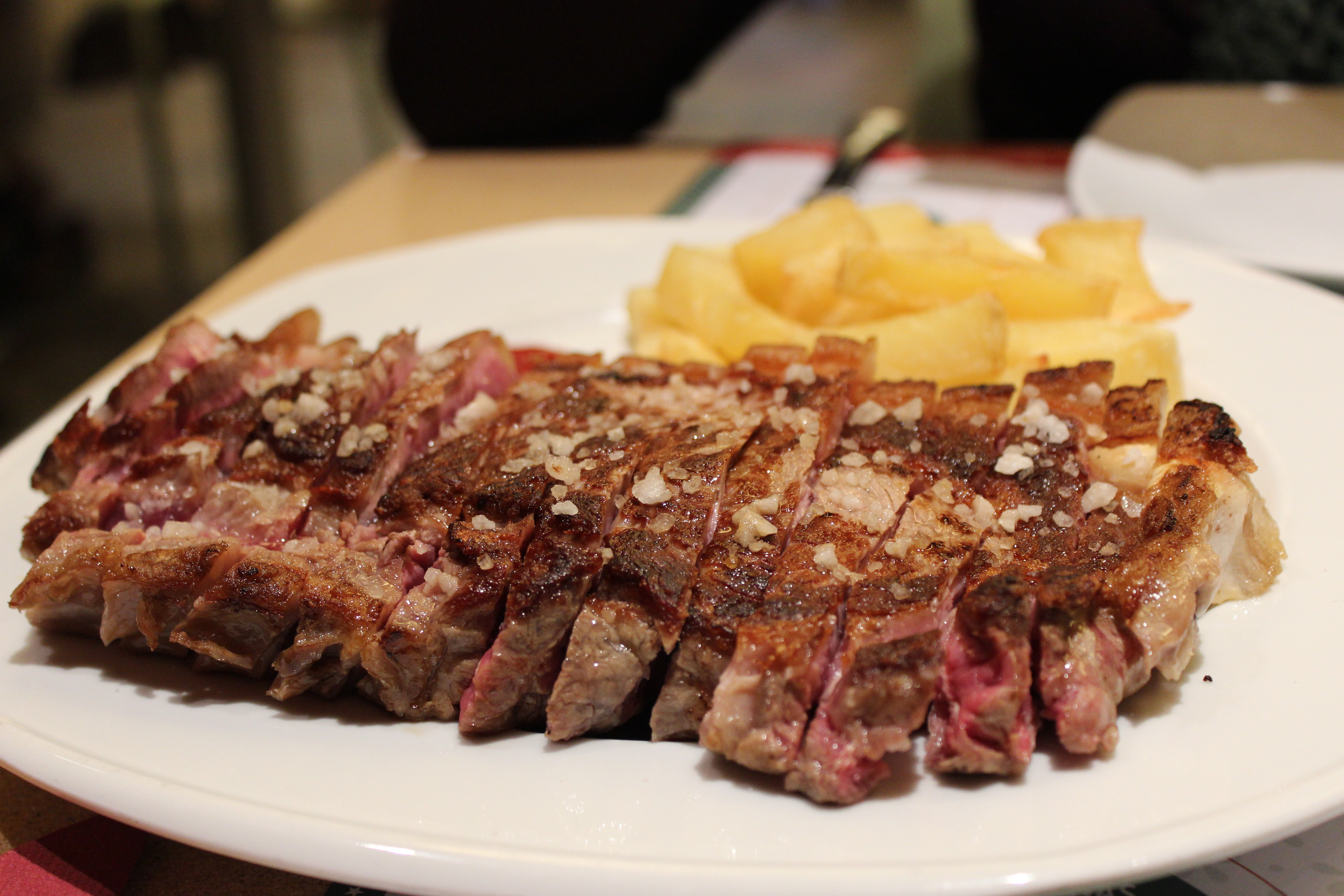
Chuletón de Ávila

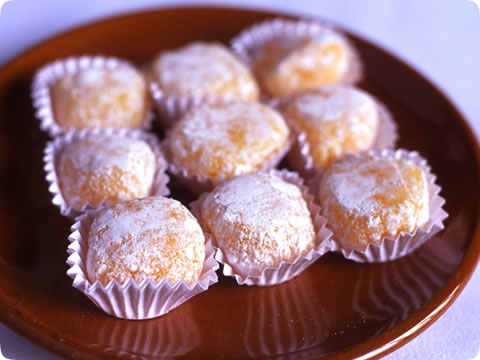
Yemas de Santa Teresa

Typical dishes of the town and region are judías del barco, chuletón de Ávila, patatas revolconas and yemas de Santa Teresa. Also worth mentioning are hornazo, bun stuffed with sausage, bacon, steak and eggs, mollejas de ternera and Cochinillo, which can be found in the capital and in Arévalo.

==== Yemas de Santa Teresa ====
This sweet can always be found in the traditional pastry shop, La Flor de Castilla. In the other bakeries in the town it is produced under the name yemas de Ávila, or simply yemas, produced as its name indicates from egg yolk.

==== Chuletón de Ávila ====
This is a grilled ribeye steak, best cooked rare, which can be enjoyed in any hotel in the town. It is made from Avileña-Negra ibérica, an indigenous black cow known for its meat, whose fame transcends the borders of the province and the country.

=== Sports ===
==== Venues ====
- Town Sport: swimming Pool, heated pool, tennis, paddle tennis, athletics, football, basketball, etc.
- North Zone: heated pool, football, basketball and tennis.
- Abulense Casino Club: pools, golf, tennis, paddle, cafeteria, restaurant, football, skating, basketball etc.
- Naturávila: golf, swimming, horse riding, walking, basketball, paddle tennis, football.
- San Antonio Sports Hall: in the north of the town is a large covered pavilion with basketball courts, tennis, soccer, squash, climbing.
- Polideportivo Carlos Sastre, on the outskirts of the town. Its inauguration took place on 30 January 2009, with a friendly match between Óbila Club de Basket of LEB Plata and LEB Oro C.B. León. It has basketball courts, soccer, tennis, volleyball, etc.

==== Teams ====
The town is home to Óbila CB, a professional basketball team of Spain's LEB Plata. The team plays its home games at the Multiusos Carlos Sastre.

The local football team, Real Ávila CF, plays at the Adolfo Suárez Stadium, owned by the municipality.

== Main sights ==
=== Architecture ===
==== The Walls of Ávila ====
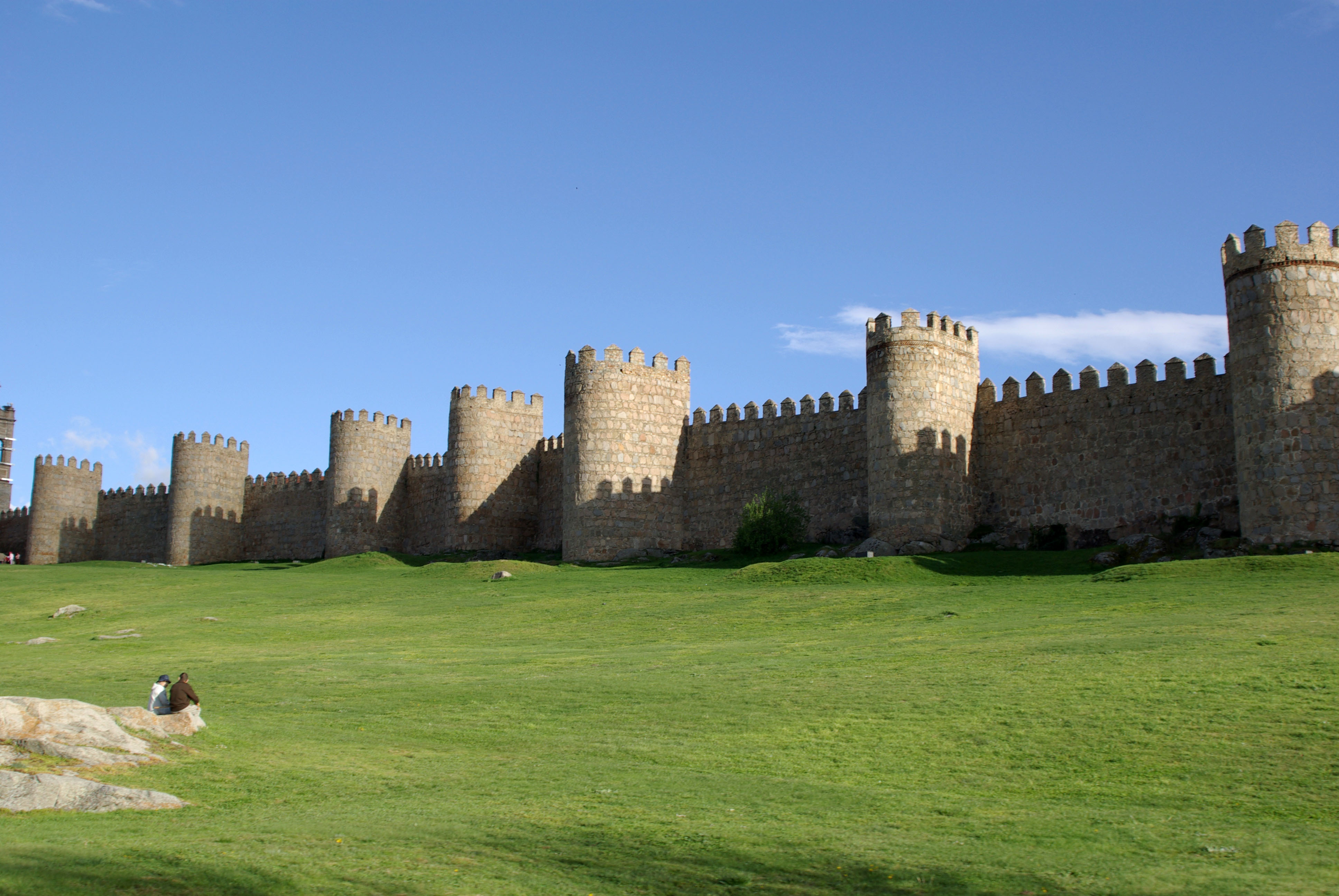
The Walls of Ávila.

The main landmark in the city is the imposing Walls of Ávila (11th–14th centuries), begun in 1090. The enclosed area is 31 hectares (77 acres) with a perimeter of 2,516 metres (2,752 yd), 88 blocks of semicircular towers, 2,500 merlons, curtain walls 3 m (9 ft 10 in) thick, with an average height of 12 m (39 ft), and 9 gates.

The walls represent the largest fully illuminated monument in the world. It is possible to walk upon the walls for roughly half their circumference. While some of the walls will never be walkable because of their integration into other structures, a large stretch has yet to be made safe for pedestrians.

==== Cathedral ====
View of the Cathedral of Ávila

The construction of the iron-grey granite Gothic Cathedral of Ávila is said to have commenced in 1107 under Alvar Garcia de Estrella. Other historians believe the cathedral to be the work of the master mason Fruchel in the 12th century, coinciding with the repopulation of the town led by Raymond of Burgundy. The eastern apse, which forms part of the town walls, is half church, half fortress, and it was here that the loyal citizens elevated Alonso VII as their king, hence Ávila del Rey. The transept was finished in 1350 by Bishop Sancho de Ávila. The earlier Romanesque parts are made of a striking red-and-white "blood" limestone, while the Gothic parts were built with pure white stone.

- Northern façade: Gothic style at left and added renaissance at right. Porch of the Apostles.
- Western front: Burgundian style, with two towers forming a covered portal.
- Interior: Latin cross with three naves, a crossing and ambulatory.
- Capilla Mayor: Features a monumental altarpiece by Pedro Berruguete.
- Chapel of San Segundo, the first bishop: Attached to a column of the cruise. Renaissance style.
- Chapel of Santa Catalina: Made of alabaster.
- Choir and Rood screen: Renaissance style, decorated with reliefs depicting scenes of saints, carved from limestone. The alabaster tomb of Alonso Tostado de Madrigal, bishop in 1499, shown in the act of writing is in the ambulatory: "so enlightened were his doctrines that they caused the blind to see".
- Cloister: Access from the Romanesque cathedral by a door on the south aisle. Gothic style.

==== Basílica de San Vicente ====
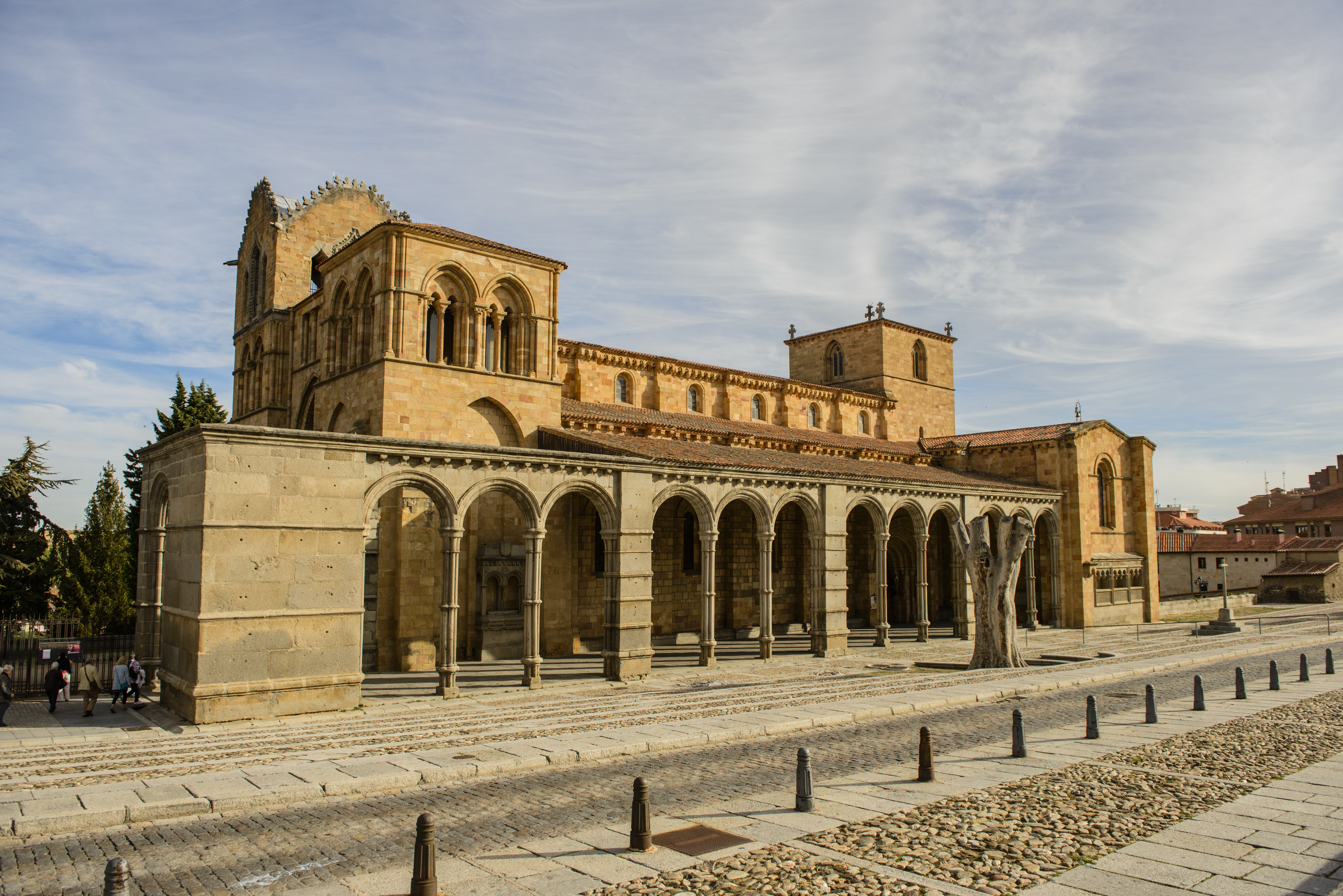
Basilica of San Vicente

- Construction began in the 12th century and lasted until the 14th century. Its design is attributed to the French master Giral Fruchel, the author himself from the cathedral and pioneer of the Gothic style in Spain.
- The overall structure is similar to the Latin basilicas. It has a Latin cross plan, three naves, dome, tribunes, three apses, atrium, two towers, and crypt.
- All the façade and the environment where it is located are of great artistic value.
- Interior: Latin cross room with three naves. The pillars are of a Greek cross with half columns on the heads.
- Crypt: Consists of three chapels, for the three apses of the church are mainly romanesque and have the best capitals of the monument.

Highlight the tomb of Saint Peter of the Boat and, above all, the Cenotaph of the Holy Brothers Martyrs, the head of the temple, Saint Vincent of Ávila, and her sisters, along with the torture he suffered in the 4th century, Saint Sabina and Saint Cristeta, (Cenotafio de los santos Vicente, Sabina y Cristeta), one of the most important works of Romanesque sculpture in Spain.

==== Convento de San José ====
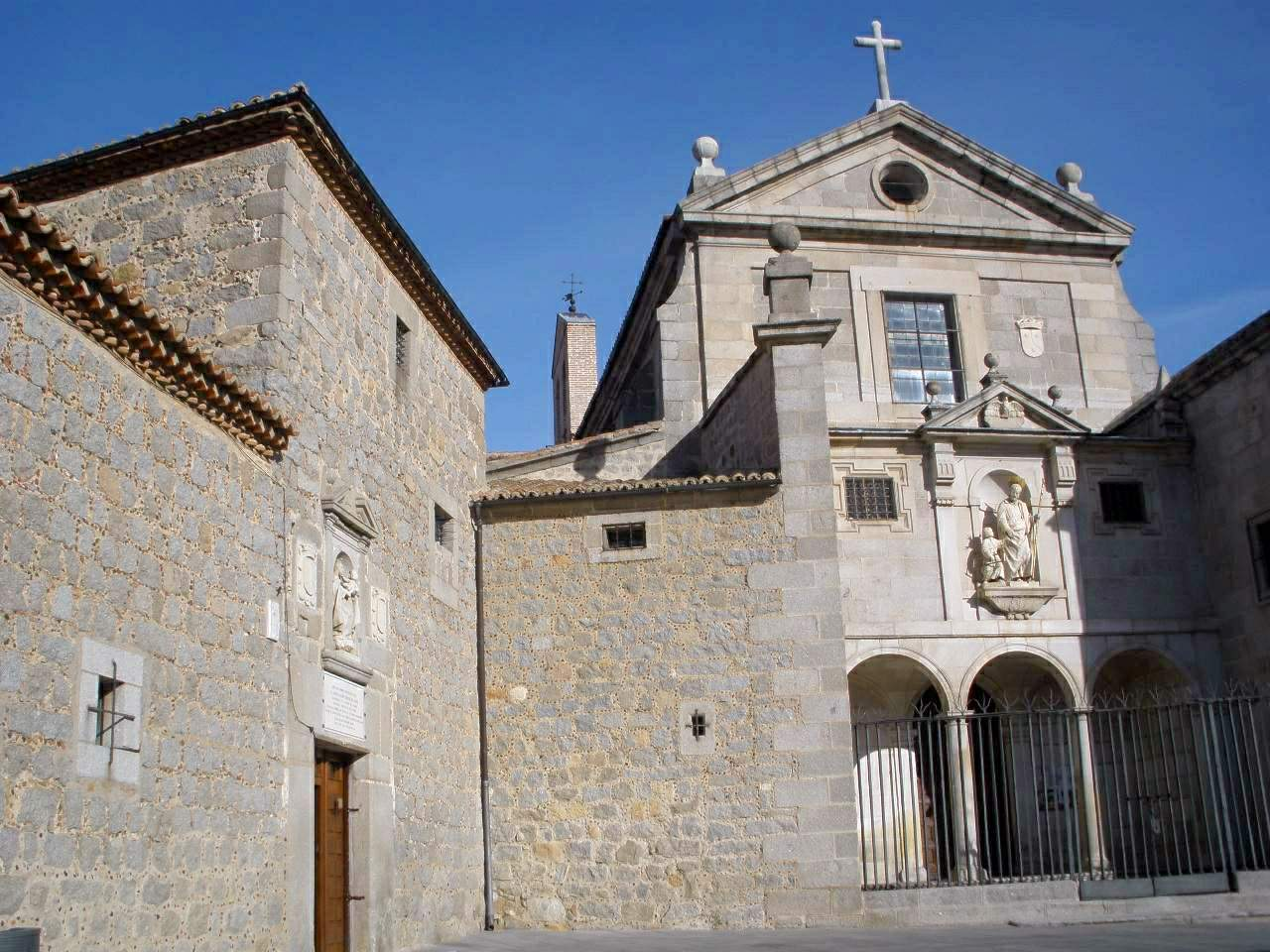
Convento de San José

The Convent of Saint Joseph is the first monastery of Discalced Carmelite nuns founded by Saint Teresa of Jesus. The convent was built in the year of 1562, although the most important architectural element, the church, was built in 1607. The church was designed by the architect Francisco de Mora (1553–1610). It has been designated a national monument since 1968.

==== Iglesia de San Pedro ====
- Start date: about 1100.
- The church of Saint Peter is located outside the town walls in the Plaza de Mercado Grande at the door of the Alcazar. Presents analogous with that of San Vicente.
- Latin cross floor and three naves of five sections. Apsidal chapels: mayor chapel, chapel of the south apse and chapel of the north apse.

==== Ermita de San Segundo ====
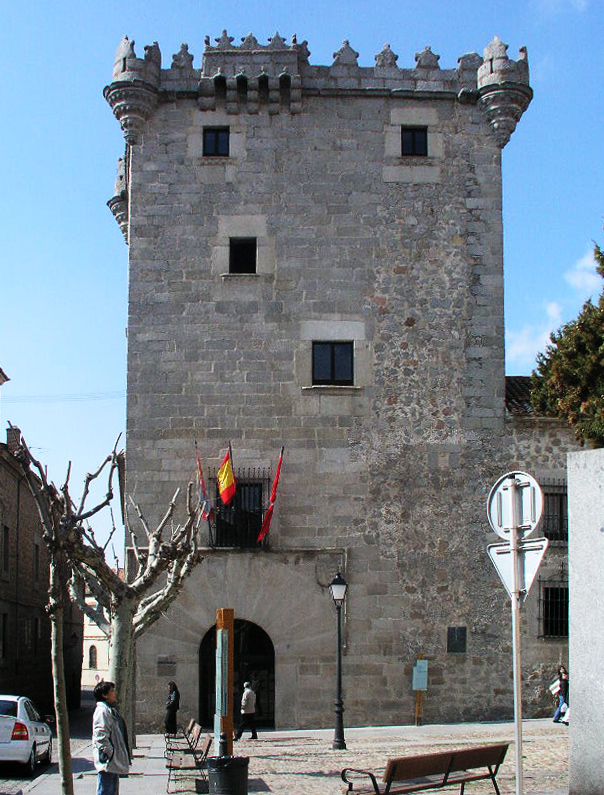
Torreón de los Guzmanes

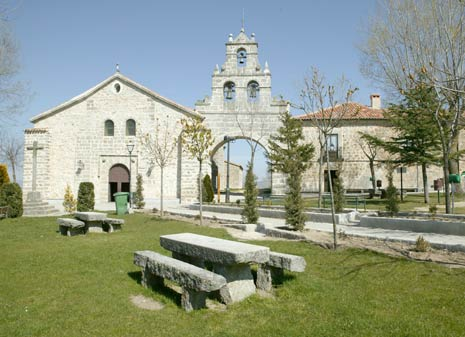
Santuario de Nuestra Señora de Sonsoles

A hermitage located to the west of Ávila, outside the town walls, on the right bank of the Adaja river. It highlights the sculpted capitals in which the sculptor is the footprint of the apse of San Andrés. Alabaster statues were made by Juan de Juni. Popular belief has it that, on introducing a handkerchief into the tomb and asking for three wishes, the saint will grant one. His pilgrimage is celebrated on 2 May, Segundo being the patron saint of Ávila.

==== Palacio de Don Diego del Águila ====
This 16th-century palace is located inside the walls and attached to it as junt walk through the door of San Vicente, defended the access of Muslim troops. Located on a busy street by different arms of the Águila family.

==== Real Monasterio de Santo Tomás ====
Real Monasterio de Santo Tomás is a Dominican convent of the late 15th century. Despite being away from the historic centre, it is one of the most important monuments of the town.

==== Santuario de Nuestra Señora de Sonsoles ====
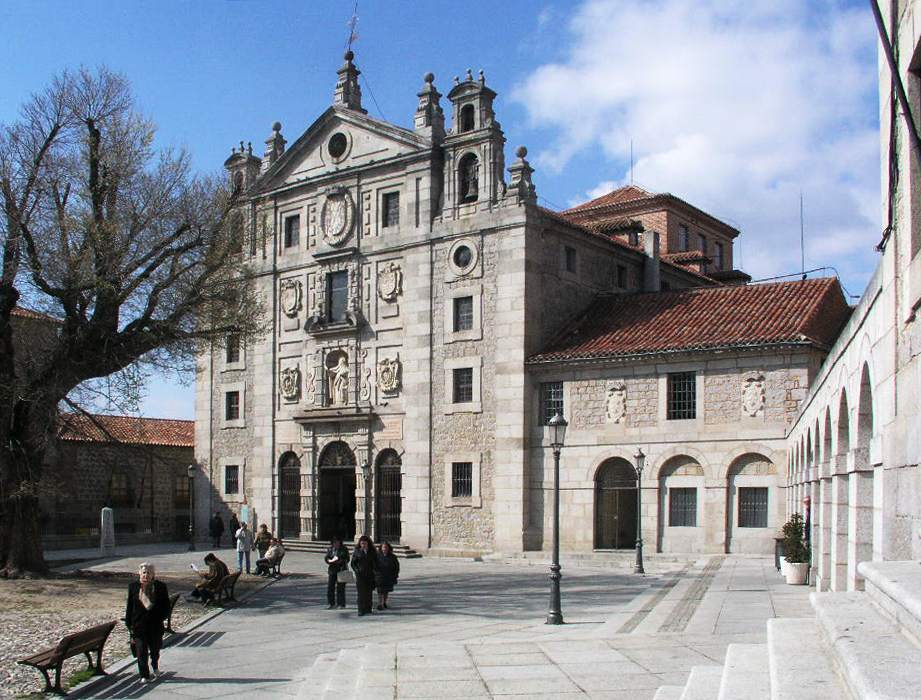
Convento de Santa Teresa

This sanctuary is located 6 km from the capital in a picturesque area, and has a restaurant, hostel, picnic areas, and playgrounds.

It houses the statue of the Virgin of Sonsoles, co-patroness of Ávila, and patroness of the fields in the province.

It is a tradition in this town to make pilgrimage to the sanctuary, make a wish to the Virgin, and get to the door barefoot until entering the church.

=== Secular architecture ===
Notable examples of secular architecture are the Valderrábanos Palace (15th century), the Casa de los Deanes (16th century), the Torreón de los Guzmanes and the Verdugos Palace (15th–16th centuries).

==== Conference and Exhibition Centre Lienzo Norte ====
- In mid-2007, work began on the convention centre. In April 2009, its construction was completed and it opened its doors.
- The building, designed by architect Francisco José Mangado, is modern in style. It covers and area of 19,800 m^{2} (213,125 sq ft), including the area of the neighbouring gardens and parking.
- There is a large symphony hall, large glass galleries, café, restaurant, conference room, catering services, storage, reception, store room, etc.
- The symphony hall has a capacity of 2,000 and the secondary hall of 500. The two conference rooms have each 1,000 seats.

=== Museums ===
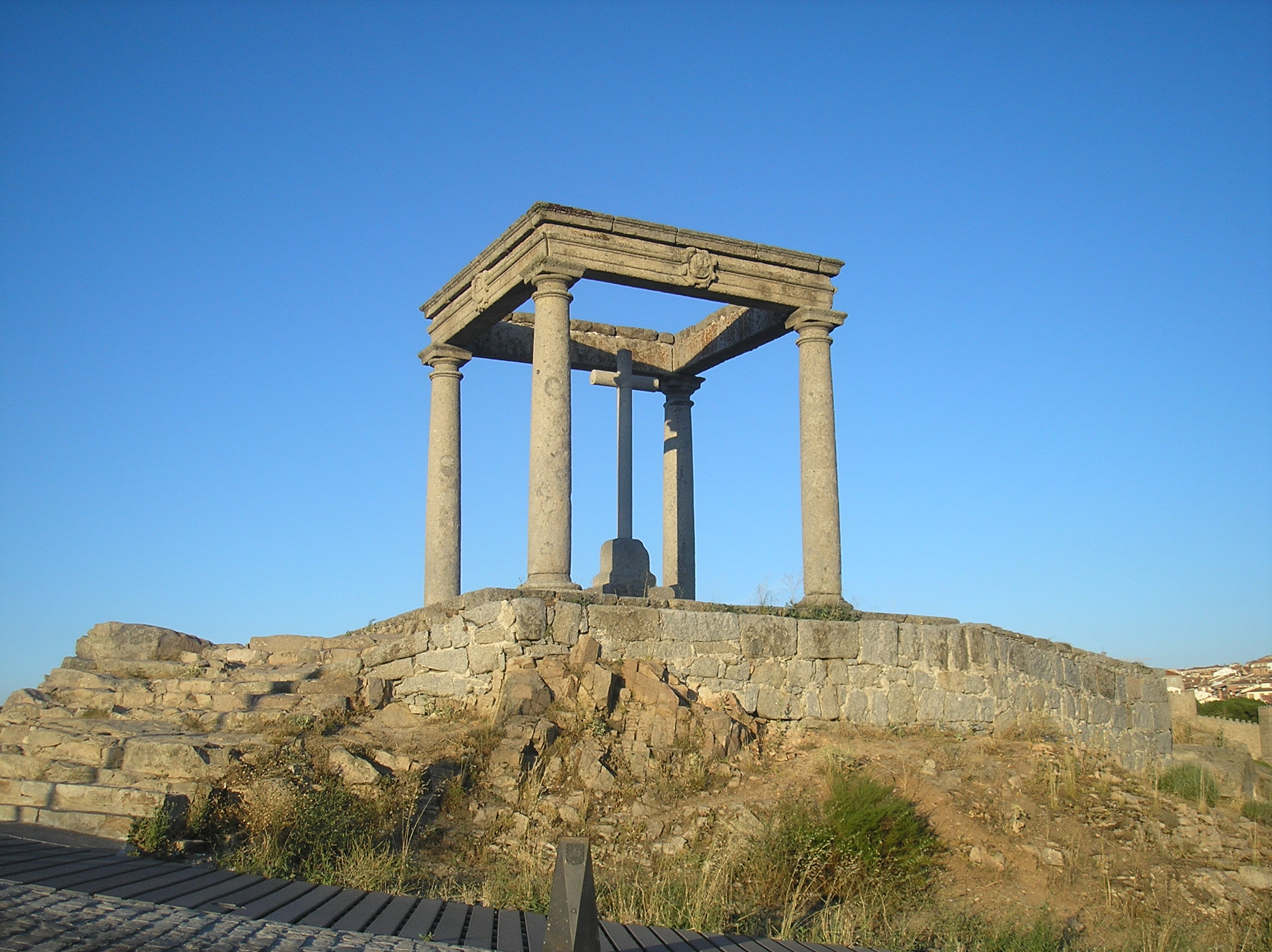
Los Cuatro (The Four) Postes, landmark spot in Ávila

- Museum of Ávila
- Museum of la Encarnación
- Museum of Santa Teresa
- Museum of the Cathedral
- Museo of Santo Tomás
- Museum of Oriental Art
- Museum of Natural Sciences

=== Other sights ===
- Living Water
- Hall of Torreón de los Guzmanes
- Sala de la Diputación
- Sala del Episcopio
- Caprotti Museum (which houses the work of Italian painter Guido Caprotti (1887–1966), based in Ávila from 1916)

== Twin towns – sister cities ==
Ávila is twinned with:

- Guanajuato, Guanajuato, Mexico
- Rhodes, Rhodes Island, Greece
- Rueil-Malmaison, Île-de-France, France
- Teramo, Abruzzo, Italy
- Villeneuve-sur-Lot, Nouvelle-Aquitaine, France

== Infrastructure ==
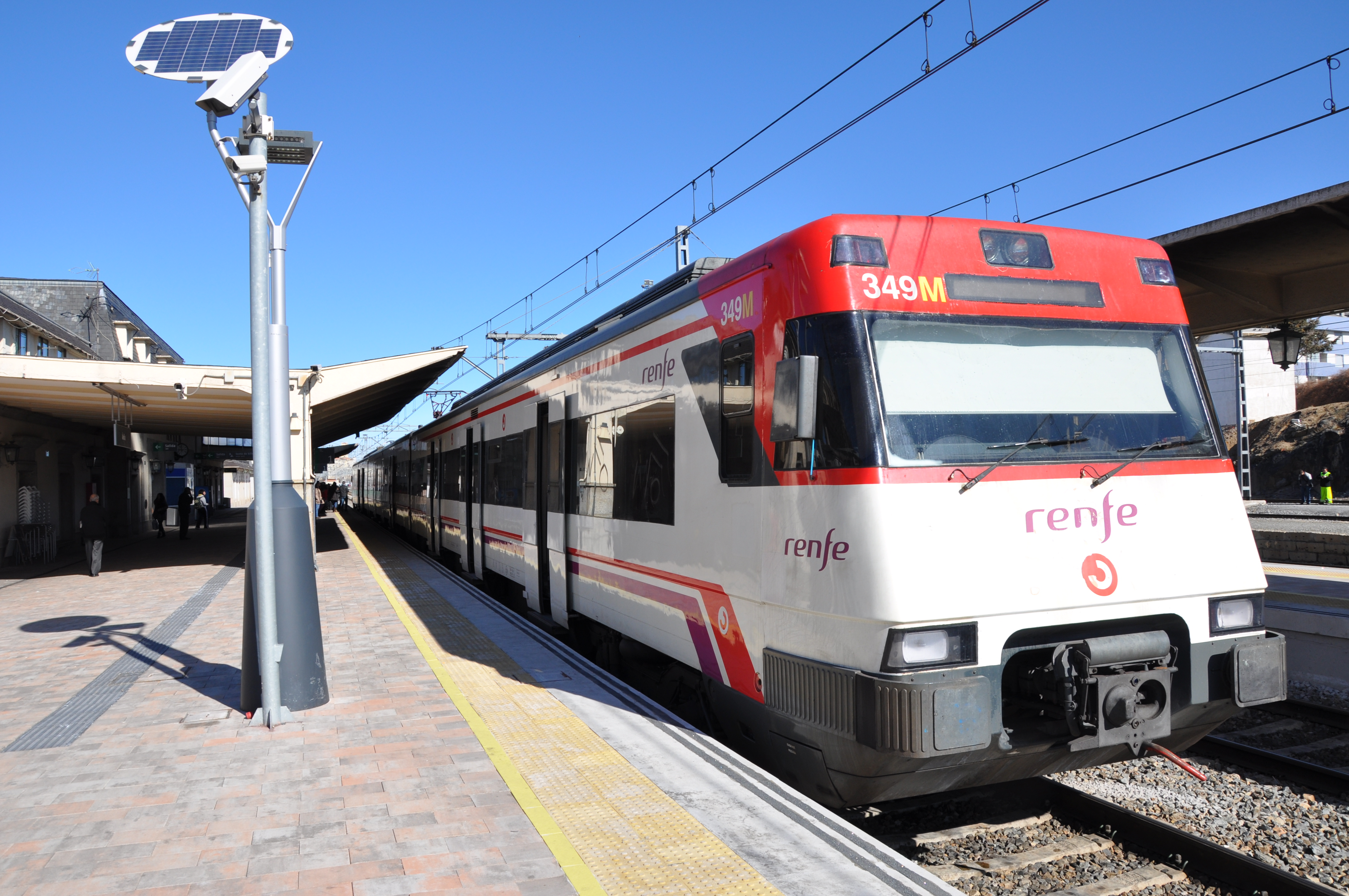
A train at the Ávila railway station

The Ávila Railway Station serves the town. The closest airport is Adolfo Suárez in Madrid-Barajas. The city can be reached via the A-6 from Madrid. The city itself can be explored on foot, although there is a public service of buses running throughout the city. Also, there is a bus station that has intercity bus connections; it was built to replace the 1974-era old station located on Avenida de Madrid. There is an underground parking lot under the main square ("El grande").

The Old Town city zone is nowadays closed to private cars, and outside the walls are many roundabouts that help traffic flow, and the ring road that goes from the bus station to the southern zone bordering the walls makes it possible to cross the entire city by car or walking in less than 30 minutes. In the 70s and 80s most traffic lights were replaced with roundabouts, but many lights still exist in the central zone where it is not possible to put roundabouts. Also in that time, the city had relatively large growth, which led to the creation of many social neighborhoods around the old town area.

The Hospital Nuestra Señora de Sonsoles (Our lady of Sonsoles Hospital), the Adolfo Suárez stadium, the residential zones as Urbanización Las Hervencias, la ciudad deportiva (sporting city) with pools, a running track, soccer and football camp; the office building (La calera), the tower-residential flats zone (Madrigal de Altas Torres), the workers' quarter like San José Obrero (St. Joseph of the Worker), the retirement building (Residencia de tercera edad), the students' residence (Valle Ambles), hotels like Don Carmelo and Sercotel, new schools and high schools, and the 4-lane principal avenues Hornos Caleros and Carretera de Valladolid were built in the 70s and 80s. This doubled the population and provided the city with modern services. Nowadays, there is a mall near the hospital in the northern zone.

== See also ==
- List of people from Ávila, Spain
- Kingdom of Castile
- Old Castile
