= St. Teresa of Avila Church =

St. Teresa of Avila Church may refer to:

- St. Teresa of Avila Church (Bodega, California), United States
- St. Teresa of Avila Church (New York City), United States
- St Teresa of Avila Church, Chiddingfold, England
- Church of St Teresa of Avila, Birkdale, England
- Our Lady of Grace and St Teresa of Avila, Chingford, London, England

== See also ==
- St. Theresa of Avila Roman Catholic Church, Detroit, Michigan, United States
- Iglesia-convento de Santa Teresa, in Ávila, Spain
- St. Teresa of Avila Cathedral (disambiguation)
