= St. Teresa of Avila Cathedral =

St. Teresa of Avila Cathedral may refer to:

- St. Teresa of Avila Cathedral (Amos), Quebec, Canada
- Cathedral of St. Theresa of Avila, Subotica, Serbia
- Bjelovar Cathedral, officially St. Teresa of Ávila Cathedral, Bjelovar, Croatia
- Požega Cathedral, officially St. Teresa of Ávila Cathedral, Požega, Croatia

== See also ==
- Iglesia-convento de Santa Teresa, in Ávila, Spain
- St. Teresa of Avila Church (disambiguation)
- Ávila Cathedral
