= Basilica of San Vicente =

Spanish church

Coordinates: 40°39′28″N 4°41′49″W

- Basílica de los Santos Hermanos Mártires, Vicente, Sabina y Cristeta
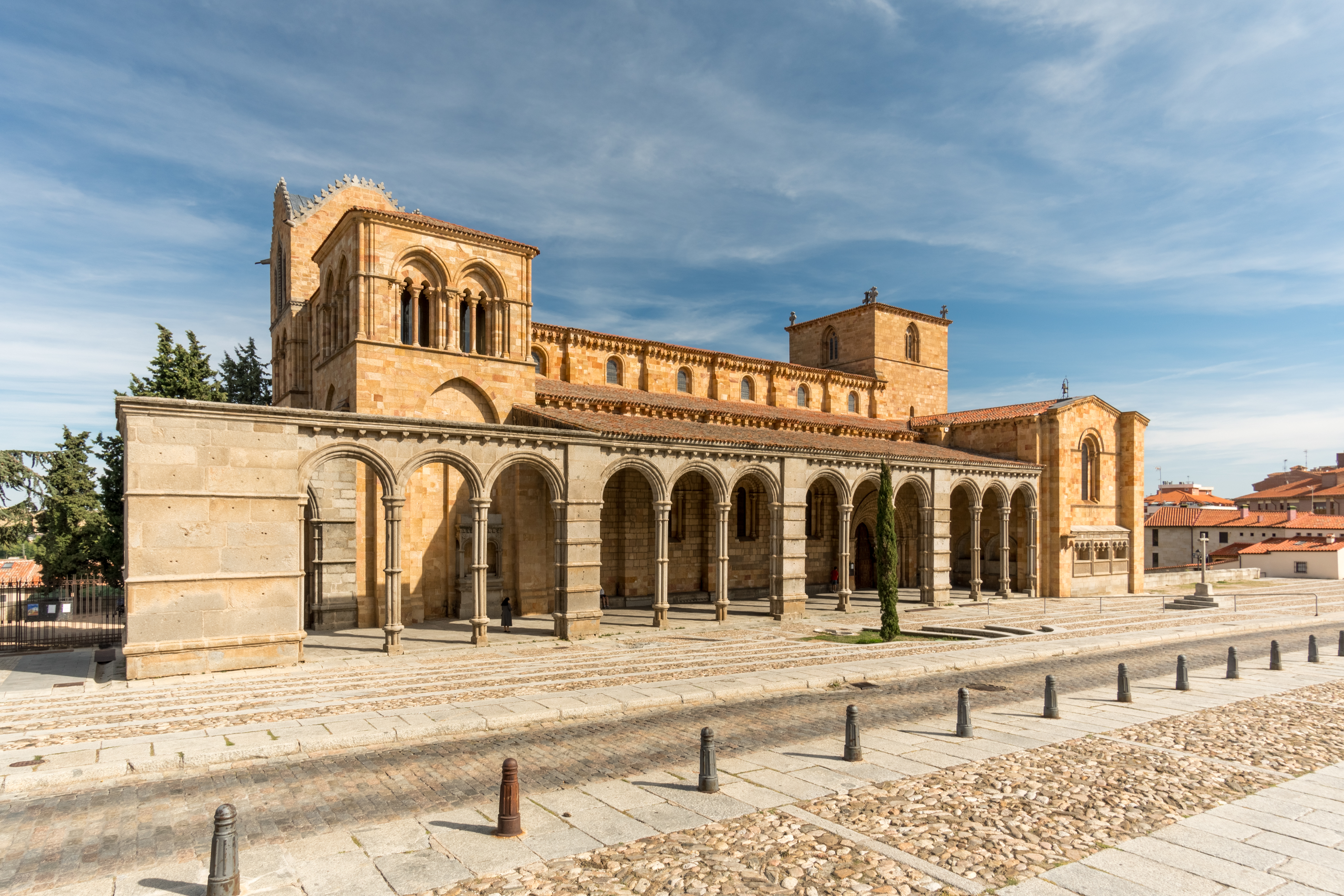

Religion
- Affiliation: Roman Catholic
- Status: Church

Location
- Location: Ávila, Spain
- Interactive map of Basilica of San Vicente

Architecture
- Style: Romanesque
- UNESCO World Heritage Site
- Criteria: Cultural: (iii), (iv)
- Designated: 1985 (9th session)
- Parent listing: Old Town of Ávila with its Extra-Muros Churches
- Reference no.: 348-003
- Spanish Cultural Heritage
- Type: Non-movable
- Criteria: Monument
- Designated: 26 July 1882
- Reference no.: RI-51-0000031

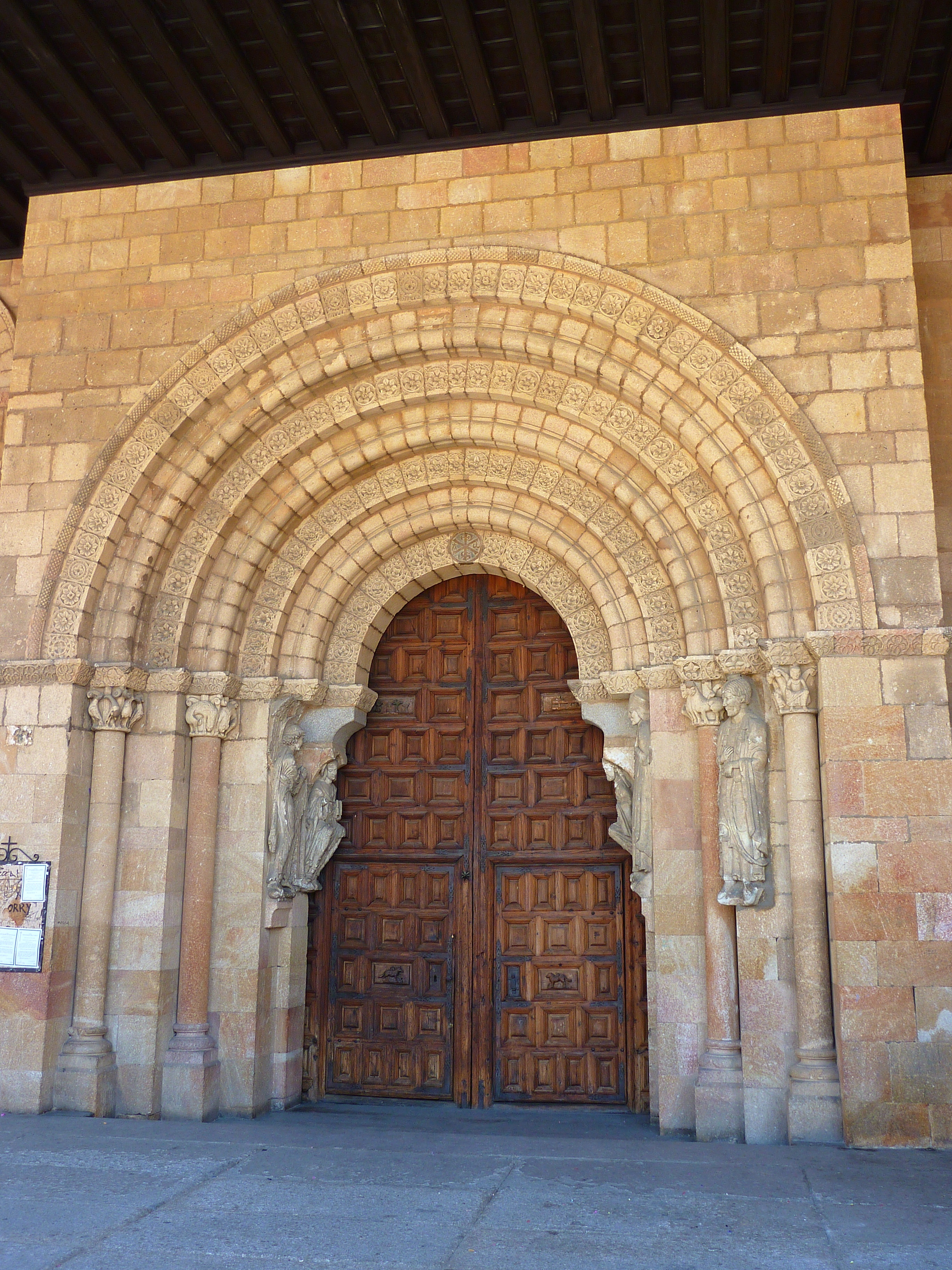
Southern portal.

The Basílica de los Santos Hermanos Mártires, Vicente, Sabina y Cristeta, best known as Basílica de San Vicente, is a church in Ávila, Spain. It is one of the best examples of Romanesque architecture in the country.

== History ==
According to legend, Christian martyrs Vicente, Sabina and Cristeta were martyred during the rule of the Roman Emperor Diocletian; their corpses were buried into the rock and later a basilica was built over their tombs. In 1062 their remains were moved to the monastery of San Pedro de Arlanza in Burgos, but later, in 1175, they were returned to Ávila and the construction of a new basilica was started at the location. Construction was repeatedly halted or slowed, and were finished in the fourteenth century thanks to the support of Alfonso X and Sancho IV. The nave and aisles are cross-vaulted. The image of the Virgen de la Soterraña, 'Our Lady of the Underground', patron saint of the city, is located there as well.

The most notable aspect of the exterior are the decorated western and southern gates. In the interior, the most renowned attraction is the cenotaph of the titular martyrs, in polychrome stone. It is one of the best examples of Romanesque sculpture.

== Description ==
The church is built using rock extracted from quarries of the nearby La Colilla. However, as in all the churches of Avila where this rock is described as sandstone, it is in fact decomposed granite. It is attributed to Giral Fruchel, the architect who introduced the Gothic style in Spain from France.

San Vicente is on the Latin cross plan, with a nave and two aisles ending in semicircular apses, with a large transept, ciborium, atrium and a crypt.

== Conservation ==
The monastery is protected as part of a World Heritage Site, "Old Town of Avila and its extra muros churches"; it is listed as one of ten extra muros churches (that is, outside the walled city) included in the site.

== Sources ==
- De las Heras Fernández, Félix (1991). La iglesia de San Vicente de Ávila y la capilla de San Segundo (2nd ed.). Fundación Claudio Sánchez-Albornoz. ISBN 84-404-8773-8.
