= List of works by José Martínez Ruiz =

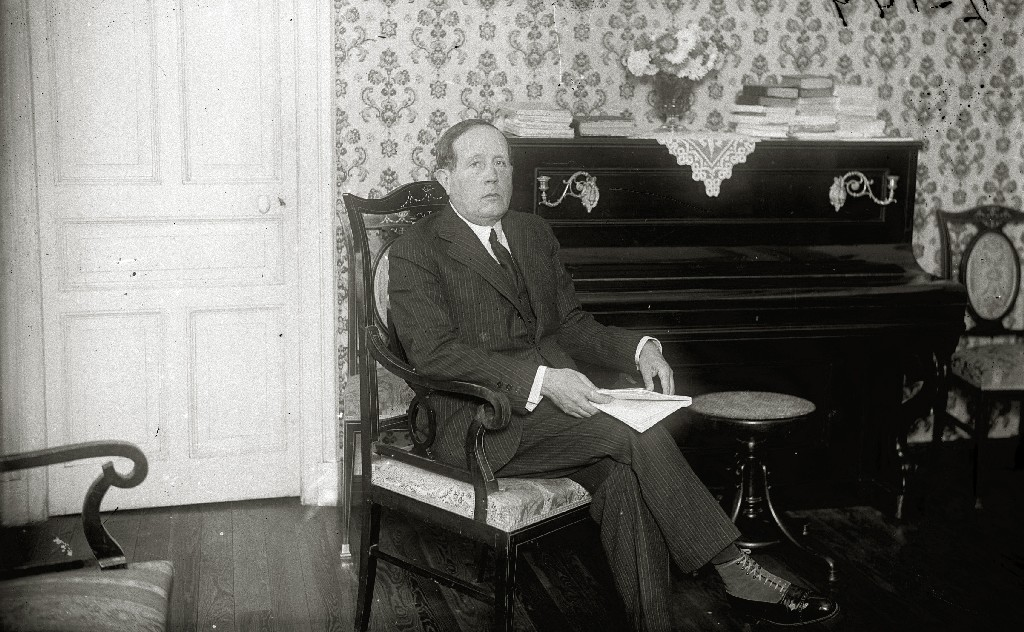
José Martínez Ruiz, in his private study in Guipúzcoa, Spain, 1928

This list of works from José Martínez Ruiz, also authored under his pseudonym Azorín, catalogues the Spanish author's major published works. In addition to being a novelist, Martínez was a novelist, essayist, literary critic, and to a lesser extent, a political radical. Much of his portfolio of work centered on the societal value of Spanish culture. During the Spanish Civil War, 1936 to 1939, Martínez wrote newspaper articles in Argentina's La Nación, later resuming novel-writing in Madrid in 1943.

== List ==
Published under the pseudonym Azorín, unless otherwise indicated:

- Cándido (1893). La crítica literaria in España. Valencia: Imprenta de Francisco Vives Mora.
- Cándido (1893). Moratín. Madrid: Librería de Fernando Fé.
- Arhimán (1894). Buscapiés. Madrid: Librería de Fernando Fé.
- Ruiz (1895). Anarquistas literarios. Madrid: Librería de Fernando Fé.
- Ruiz (1895). Notas sociales. Madrid: Librería de Fernando Fé.
- Ruiz (1896). Literatura. Madrid: Librería de Fernando Fé.
- Ruiz (1897). Charivari. Madrid: Imprenta Plaza del Dos de Mayo.
- Ruiz (1897). Bohemia. Madrid: V. Vela impresor.
- Ruiz (1898). Soledades. Madrid: Librería de Fernando Fé.
- Ruiz (1897). Pecuchet, demagogo. Madrid: Imprenta de Bernardo Rodríguez.
- Ruiz (1899). La evolución de la crítica. Madrid: Librería de Fernando Fé.
- Ruiz (1899). La sociología criminal. Madrid: Librería de Fernando Fé.
- Ruiz (1900). Los Hidalgos. Madrid: Librería de Fernando Fé.
- Ruiz (1900). El alma castellana (1600–1800). Madrid: Librería Internacional.
- Diario de un enfermo. Madrid: Librería de de Ricardo Fé. 1901.
- La fuerza del amor. Madrid: La España Editorial. 1901.
- La Voluntad. Barcelona: Henrich y Cía. Editores. 1902.
- Antonio Azorín. Madrid: Viuda de Rodríguez Serra. 1903.
- Las confesiones de un pequeño filósofo. Madrid: Librería de Fernando Fé. 1904.
- Williams, Leonardo, ed. (1905). Los pueblos. Madrid.
- Williams, Leonardo, ed. (1905). La ruta de Don Quijote. Madrid.
- El político. Madrid: Hernando. 1908.
- España – Hombres y paisajes. Madrid: Librería de Francisco Beltrán. 1909.
- La Cierva. Madrid: Sucesores de Hernando. 1910.
- Lecturas españolas. Madrid: Imprenta de la Revista de Archivosv. 1912.
- Castilla. Madrid: Revista de Archivos. 1912.
- Clásicos y modernos. Madrid: Renacimiento. 1913.
- Los valores literarios. Madrid: Renacimiento. 1914.
- Un discurso de la Cierva. Madrid: Renacimiento. 1914.
- Al margen de los clásicos. Madrid: Residencia de Estudiantes. 1915.
- El licenciado Vidriera (Tomás Rueda, 1941). Madrid: Residencia de Estudiantes. 1915.
- Rivas y Larra. Madrid: Renacimiento. 1916.
- Un pueblecito. Riofrío de Avila. Madrid: Residencia de Estudiantes. 1916.
- Parlamentarismo Español. Madrid: Editorial Calleja. 1916.
- Entre España y Francia. Barcelona: Bloud y Gay Editores. 1917.
- El paisaje de España visto por los españoles. Madrid: Renacimiento. 1917.
- Páginas escogidas. Madrid: Editorial Calleja. 1917.
- Madrid. Guía sentimental. Madrid: Biblioteca Estrella. 1918.
- París bombardeado. Madrid: Renacimiento. 1919.
- Fantasías y devaneos. Madrid: Rafael Caro Raggio. 1920.
- Los dos Luises y otros ensayos. Madrid: Rafael Caro Raggio. 1921.
- Don Juan. Madrid: Rafael Caro Raggio. 1922.
- De Granada a Castelar. Madrid: Rafael Caro Raggio. 1922.
- El chirrión de los políticos. Madrid: Rafael Caro Raggio. 1923.
- Una Hora de España. Madrid: Rafael Caro Raggio. 1924.
- Racine y Moliere. Madrid: Cuadernos Literarios de La Lectura. 1924.
- Los Quinteros y otras páginas. Madrid: Rafael Caro Raggio. 1925.
- Doña Inés. Madrid: Rafael Caro Raggio. 1925.
- Old Spain. Madrid: Rafael Caro Raggio. 1926.
- Brandy: mucho brandy. Madrid: Rafael Caro Raggio. 1927.
- Comedia del arte. Madrid: Prensa Moderna. 1927.
- El clamor. Madrid: Sociedad de Autores Españoles. 1928.
- Lo invisible: (trilogía); La arañita en el espejo, El segador, Doctor Death de 3 a 5. Madrid: Prensa Española. 1928.
- Félix Vargas (El caballero inactual, 1943). Madrid: Biblioteca Nueva. 1928.
- Andando y pensando. Madrid: Editorial Páez. 1929.
- Blanco en azul. Madrid: Biblioteca Nueva. 1929.
- Superrealismo (El libro de Levante, 1948). Madrid: Biblioteca Nueva. 1929.
- Angelita. Madrid: Biblioteca Nueva. 1930.
- Pueblo. Madrid: Biblioteca Nueva. 1930.
- Cervantes o la casa encantada. Madrid: Cía. Iberoamericana de Publicaciones. 1931.
- Lope en silueta. Madrid: Cruz y Raya‑Ediciones del Arbol. 1935.
- La guerrilla. Madrid: La Farsa. 1936.
- Trasuntos de España. Buenos Aires: Espasa‑Calpe Argentina. 1938.
- Españoles en París. Buenos Aires: Espasa‑Calpe Argentina. 1939.
- En torno a José Hernández. Buenos Aires: Editorial Sudamericana. 1939.
- Pensando en España. Madrid: Biblioteca Nueva. 1940.
- Valencia. Madrid: Biblioteca Nueva. 1941.
- Madrid. Madrid: Biblioteca Nueva. 1941.
- Visión de España. Buenos Aires: Espasa‑Calpe Argentina. 1941.
- El escritor. Madrid: Espasa-Calpe. 1942.
- Cavilar y contar. Barcelona: Ediciones Destino. 1942.
- Sintiendo a España. Barcelona: Editorial Tartesos. 1942.
- El enfermo. Madrid: Adán. 1943.
- Capricho. Madrid. Espasa‑Calpe. 1943.
- Memorias. Madrid: Biblioteca Nueva. 1943.
- La isla sin aurora. Barcelona: Ediciones Destino. 1944.
- Tiempos y cosas. Zaragoza: Librería General. 1944.
- Veraneo sentimental. Zaragoza: Librería General. 1944.
- Palabras al viento. Zaragoza: Librería General. 1944.
- María Fontán. Madrid: Espasa‑Calpe. 1944.
- Salvadora de Olbena. Zaragoza: Ediciones Cronos. 1944.
- Leyendo a los poetas. Zaragoza: Librería General. 1945.
- Farsa docente. Madrid: Delegación Nacional de Prensa. 1945.
- París. Madrid: Biblioteca Nueva. 1945.
- La farándula. Zaragoza: Librería General. 1945.
- Los clásicos redivivos. Los clásicos futuros. Buenos Aires: Espasa‑Calpe. 1945.
- Ante Baroja. Zaragoza: Librería General. 1946.
- Memorias inmemoriales. Madrid: Biblioteca Nueva. 1946.
- El artista y el estilo. Madrid: M. Aguilar. 1946.
- Escena y sala. Zaragoza: Librería General. 1947.
- Con Cervantes. Buenos Aires: Espasa‑Calpe Argentina. 1947.
- Ante las candilejas. Zaragoza: Librería General. 1947.
- Ángel Cruz Rueda, ed. (1947). "Crónicas del viaje regio [1905]". Obras completas. Vol. III. Madrid: Aguilar.
- "En Barcelona [1906]". Obras completas. Vol. II. 1947.
- "Literatura en la política". Obras completas. Vol. III. 1947.
- "Los norteamericanos". Obras completas. Vol. III. 1947.
- "Gabriel Miró". Obras completas. Vol. VI. 1948.
- "Clásicos cernidos". Obras completas. Vol. VI. 1948.
- "Contingencia en América". Obras completas. Vol. VII. 1948.
- "In hoc signo...". Obras completas. Vol. VIII. 1948.
- Con permiso de los cervantistas. Madrid: Biblioteca Nueva. 1948.
- Con bandera de Francia. Madrid: Biblioteca Nueva. 1950.
- La cabeza de Castilla. Buenos Aires: Espasa‑Calpe Argentina. 1950.
- El oasis de los clásicos. Madrid: Biblioteca Nueva. 1952.
- Verano en Mallorca [1906]. Palma de Mallorca: Panorama Balear. 1952.
- El cine y el momento. Madrid: Biblioteca Nueva. 1953.
- "Estética y política literarias". Obras completas. Vol. IX. 1954.
- "A voleo". Obras completas. Vol. IX. 1954.
- El buen Sancho. Madrid: Editorial Tecnos. 1954.
- Pintar como querer. Madrid: Biblioteca Nueva. 1954.
- El efímero cine. Madrid: Afrodisio Aguado. 1955.
- El pasado. Madrid: Biblioteca Nueva. 1955.
- Cuentos. Madrid: Afrodisio Aguado. 1956.
- Escritores. Madrid: Biblioteca Nueva. 1956.
- Dicho y Hecho. Barcelona: Ediciones Destino. 1957.
- Sin perder los estribos. Madrid: Taurus Ediciones. 1958.
- De un Transeunte. Madrid: Espasa Calpe. 1958.
- Agenda. Madrid: Biblioteca Nueva. 1959.
- Posdata. Madrid: Biblioteca Nueva. 1959.
- De Valera a Miró. Madrid: Afrodisio Aguado: S. A. 1959.
- Pasos quedos. Madrid: Editorial Escelicer: S. A. 1959.
- Ejercicios de castellano. Madrid: Biblioteca Nueva. 1960.
- La generación del 98. Salamanca‑Madrid: Ediciones Anaya. 1961.
- Mis mejores páginas. Barcelona: Editorial Mateu. 1961.
- Lo que pasó una vez. Barcelona: Editorial Lumen. 1962.
- Varios hombres y alguna mujer. Barcelona: Editorial Aedos. 1962.
- Historia y Vida. Madrid: Espasa‑Calpe. 1962.
- En lontananza. Madrid: Editorial Bullón. 1963.
- Los recuadros. Madrid: Biblioteca Nueva. 1963.
- Ni sí ni no. Barcelona: Destino. 1965.
- Los médicos. Valencia: Ediciones Prometeo. 1966.
- España Clara. Madrid: Editorial Doncel. 1966.
- Ultramarinos. Barcelona: Edhasa. 1966.
- Crítica de años cercanos. Madrid: Taurus Ediciones. 1967.
- La amada España. Barcelona: Ediciones Destino. 1967.
- Albacete, siempre. Albacete: Excmo. Ayuntamiento. 1970.
- Carta sin nema. Madrid: Joyas bibliográficas. 1970.
- Valverde, JM, ed. (1972). Artículos olvidados de José Martínez Ruiz (1894–1904). Madrid: Ediciones Narcea.
- Rosalía de Castro y otros motivos gallegos. Lugo: Ediciones Celta. 1973.
- Cada cosa en su sitio. Barcelona: Ediciones Destino. 1973.
- Las terceras de ABC. Madrid: Prensa Española. 1976.
- Ouimette, Victor, ed. (1987). La hora de la pluma. Periodismo de la Dictadura y de la República. Valencia: Pretextos.

== See also ==
- List of essayists
- List of Spanish-language authors
