= Medina Bridge =

Medina Bridge Puente de Medina
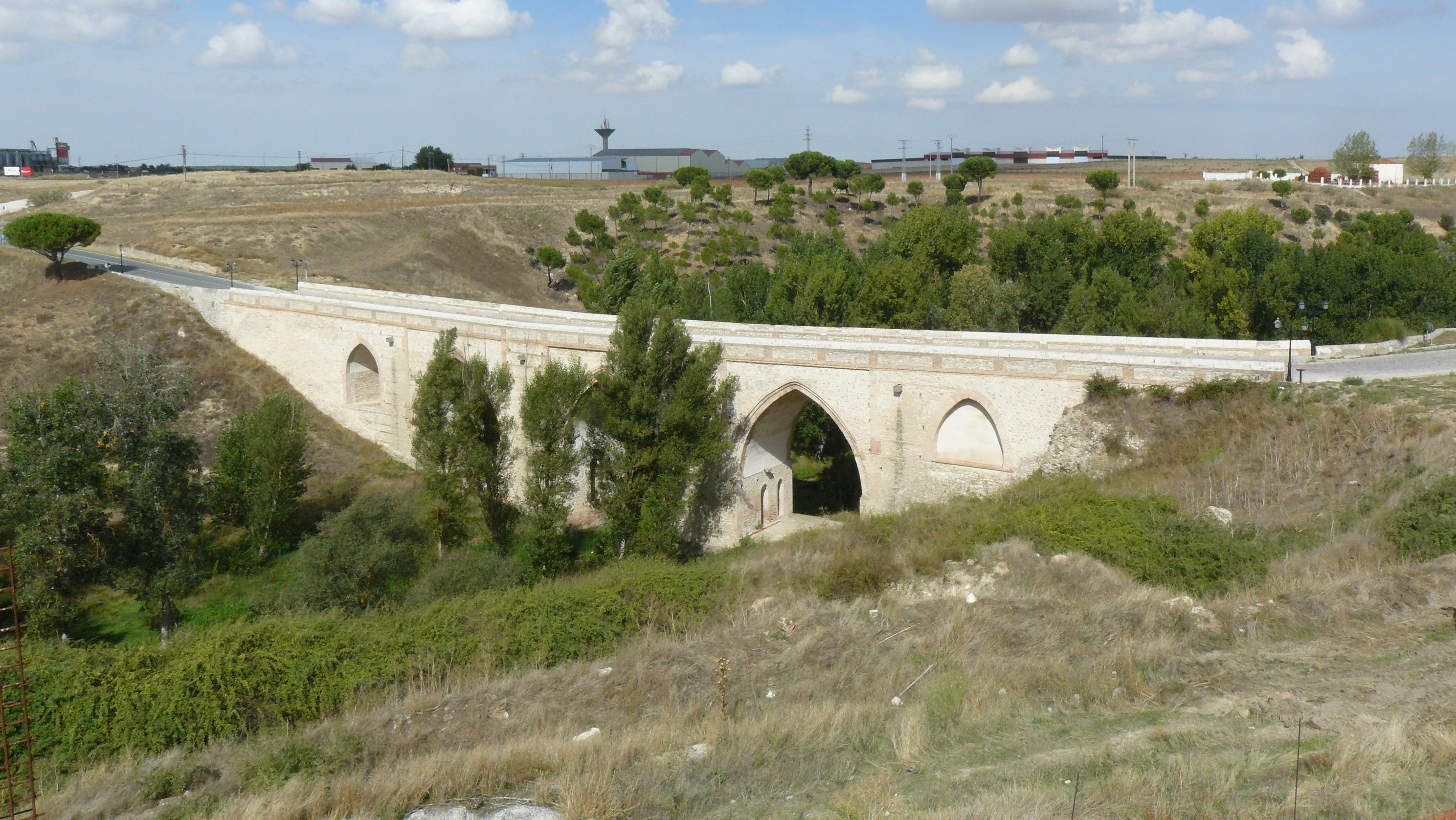
- Coordinates: 41°04′02″N 04°43′24″W
- Crosses: Arevalillo
- Locale: Arévalo, Spain
- Heritage status: Bien de Interés Cultural

Characteristics
- Design: Arch bridge

Location
- Interactive map of Medina Bridge

The Medina Bridge (Spanish: Puente de Medina) is a medieval bridge in Arévalo, Spain.

== History and description ==
It crosses over the Arevalillo. Built in mudéjar style in the 14th century, it displays three main eyes in the form of pointed arches. It was declared monumento histórico-artístico (precursor of the status of Bien de Interés Cultural via Royal Decree issued on 19 October 1983 (published in the Boletín Oficial del Estado on 27 December 1983).
