= La Colilla =

- municipality
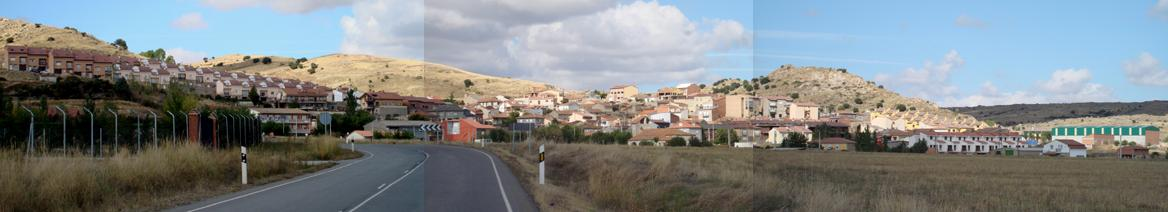
- Panorámic view of La Colilla as seen from AV-P-601 Road.

- Flag Coat of arms

- Location in Spain. La Colilla (Castile and León)
- Coordinates: 40°38′46″N 4°45′57″W
- Country: Spain
- Autonomous community: Castile and León
- Province: Ávila
- Municipality: La Colilla

Area
  - Total: 11.26 km^{2} (4.35 sq mi)
- Elevation: 1,130 m (3,710 ft)

Population (2025-01-01)
  - Total: 375
  - Density: 33.3/km^{2} (86.3/sq mi)
- Time zone: UTC+1 (CET)
  - Summer (DST): UTC+2 (CEST)
- Website: Official website

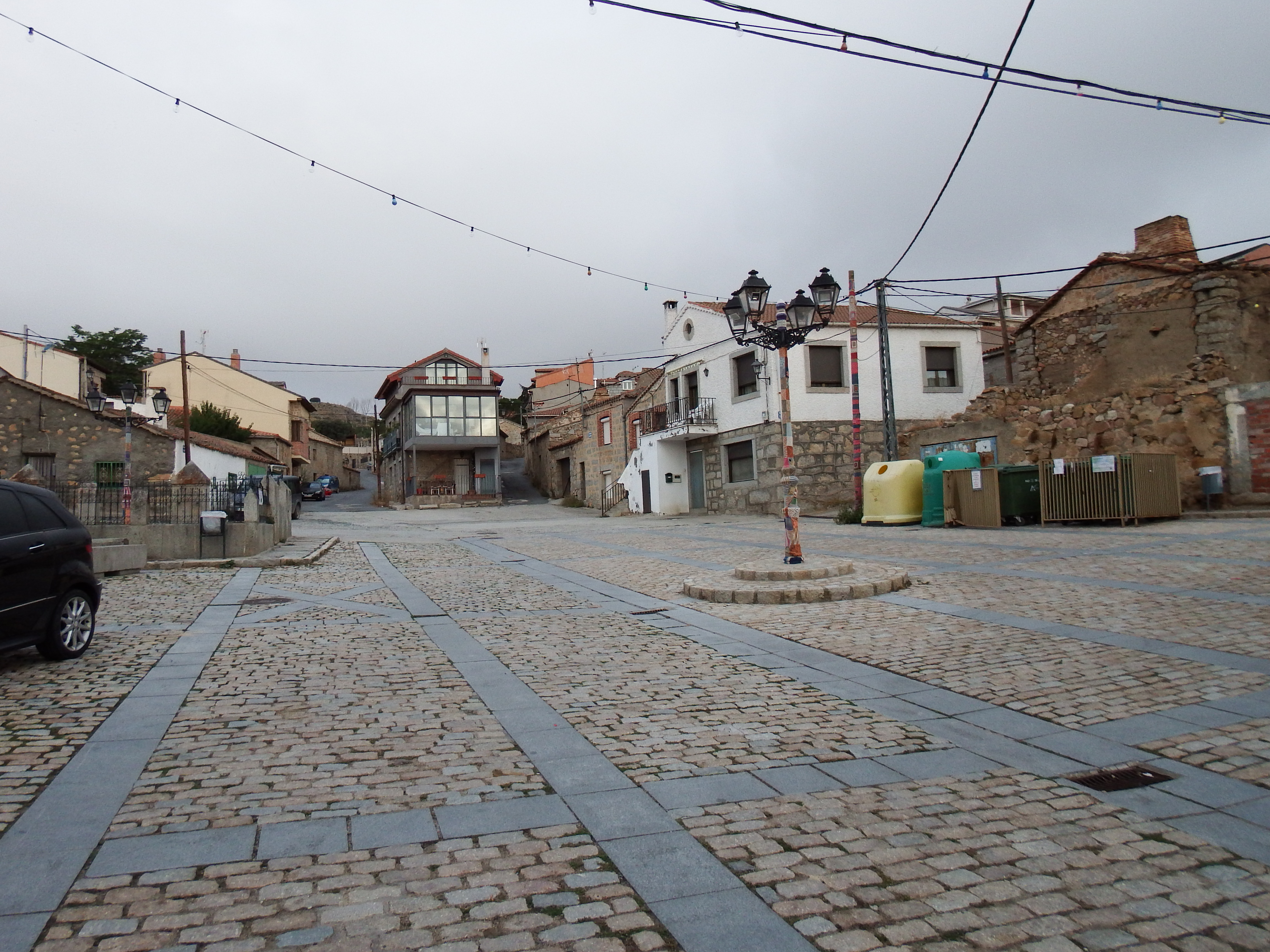
La Colilla

La Colilla is a municipality located in the province of Ávila, Castile and León, Spain.

== Population ==
Historical population
Year	Pop.	±% p.a.
2023	366	—
2024	375	+2.46%
2025	375	+0.00%
Source: INE
