= Walls of Ávila =

UNESCO World Heritage Site in Spain

- Muralla de Ávila
- Ávila, Spain
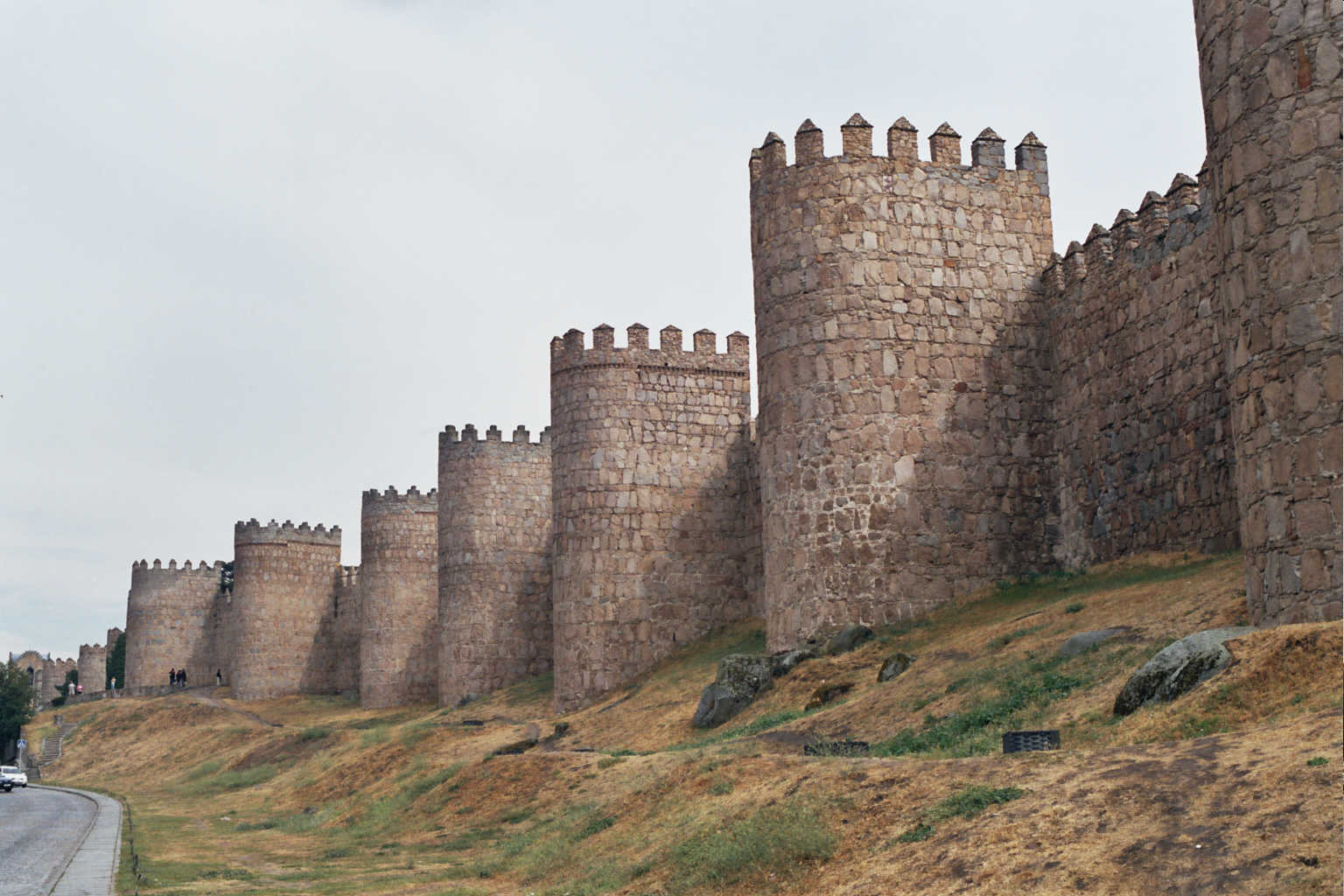
- Ávila's defensive walls

Site information
- Type: Medieval fortification

Location
- Coordinates: 40°39′23″N 4°42′0″W

UNESCO World Heritage Site
- Official name: Muralla y Puertas
- Type: Cultural
- Criteria: iii, iv
- Designated: 1985 (9th session)
- Part of: Old Town of Ávila with its Extra-Muros Churches
- Reference no.: 348bis-001
- Region: Europe and North America

Spanish Cultural Heritage
- Official name: Las Murallas de Ávila
- Type: Non-movable
- Criteria: Monument
- Designated: 24 March 1884
- Reference no.: RI-51-0000036

The Walls of Ávila, completed between the 11th and 14th centuries, are the defensive walls of Ávila, Spain, and its principal historic feature. Forming a complete circuit around the old town, they are one of the country's most complete and best-preserved medieval fortifications and among the most notable examples in Europe. The Old Town of Ávila, including the walls and its extramural churches, was declared a UNESCO World Heritage Site in 1985.

== Description ==
The work was started in 1090 but most of the defensive wall appears to have been rebuilt in the 12th century. The enclosed area is an irregular rectangle of 31 hectares (77 acres) with a perimeter of some 2,516 metres (8,255 ft), including 88 semicircular towers. The walls have an average width of 3 metres (9.8 ft) and an average height of 12 metres (39 ft). The nine gates were completed over several different periods. The Puerta de San Vicente (Gate of St Vincent) and the Puerta del Alcazar (Gate of the Fortress) are flanked by twin towers, 20 metres (66 ft) high, linked by a semicircular arch. The apse of the cathedral also forms one of the towers.

It is possible to walk upon the walls for roughly half the circumference. Whilst some of the walls will never be navigable in this way because of their integration into other structures, there is a large stretch of the walls that has yet to be made safe for pedestrians.

The site was registered as a National Monument in 1884. In 1985, the old city of Ávila and its extramural churches were declared a World Heritage site by UNESCO.

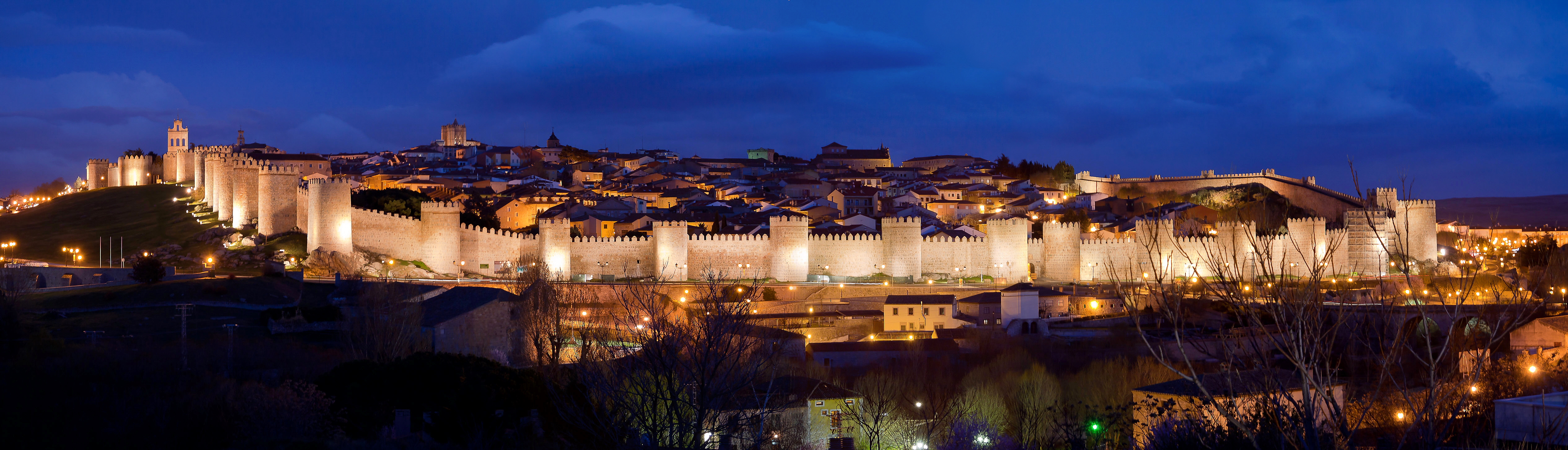
Walls by night

== Gallery ==
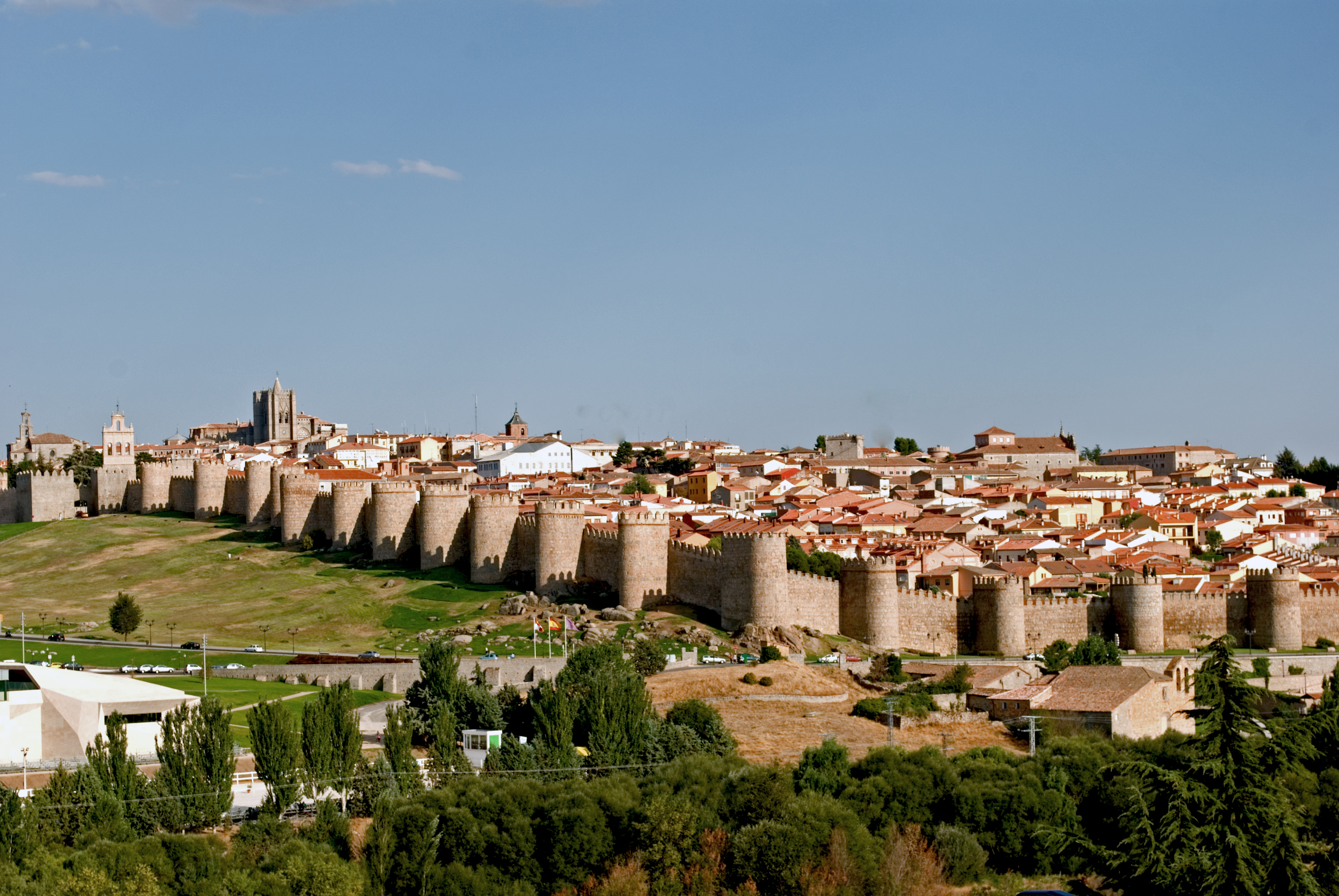
Walls of Ávila

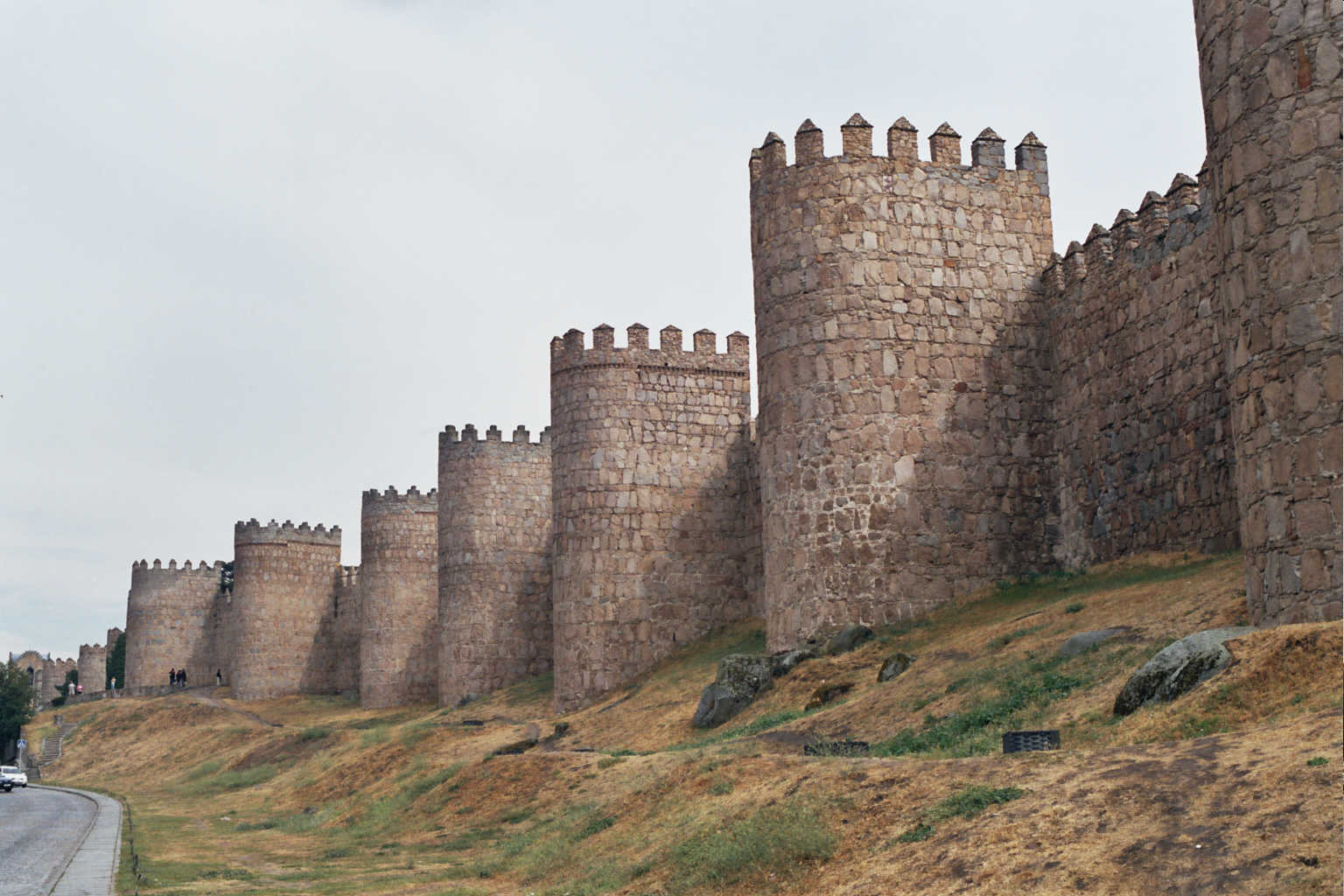
A view of the Walls of Ávila

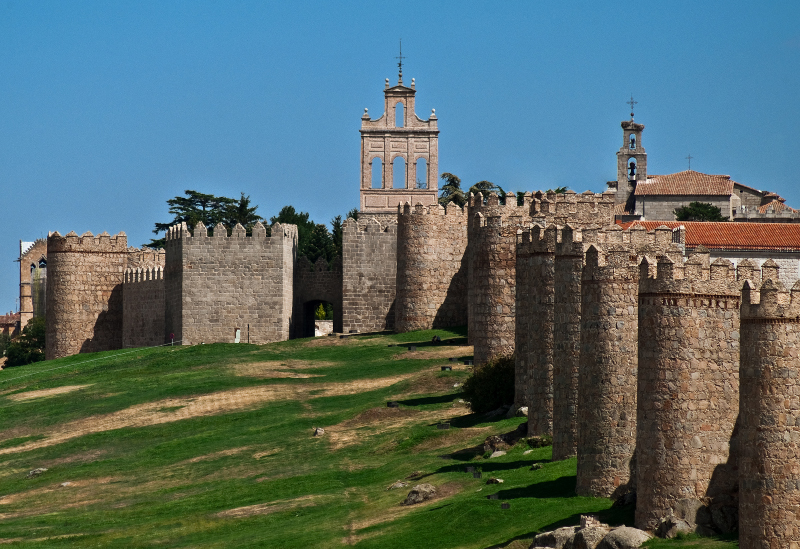
Another view.

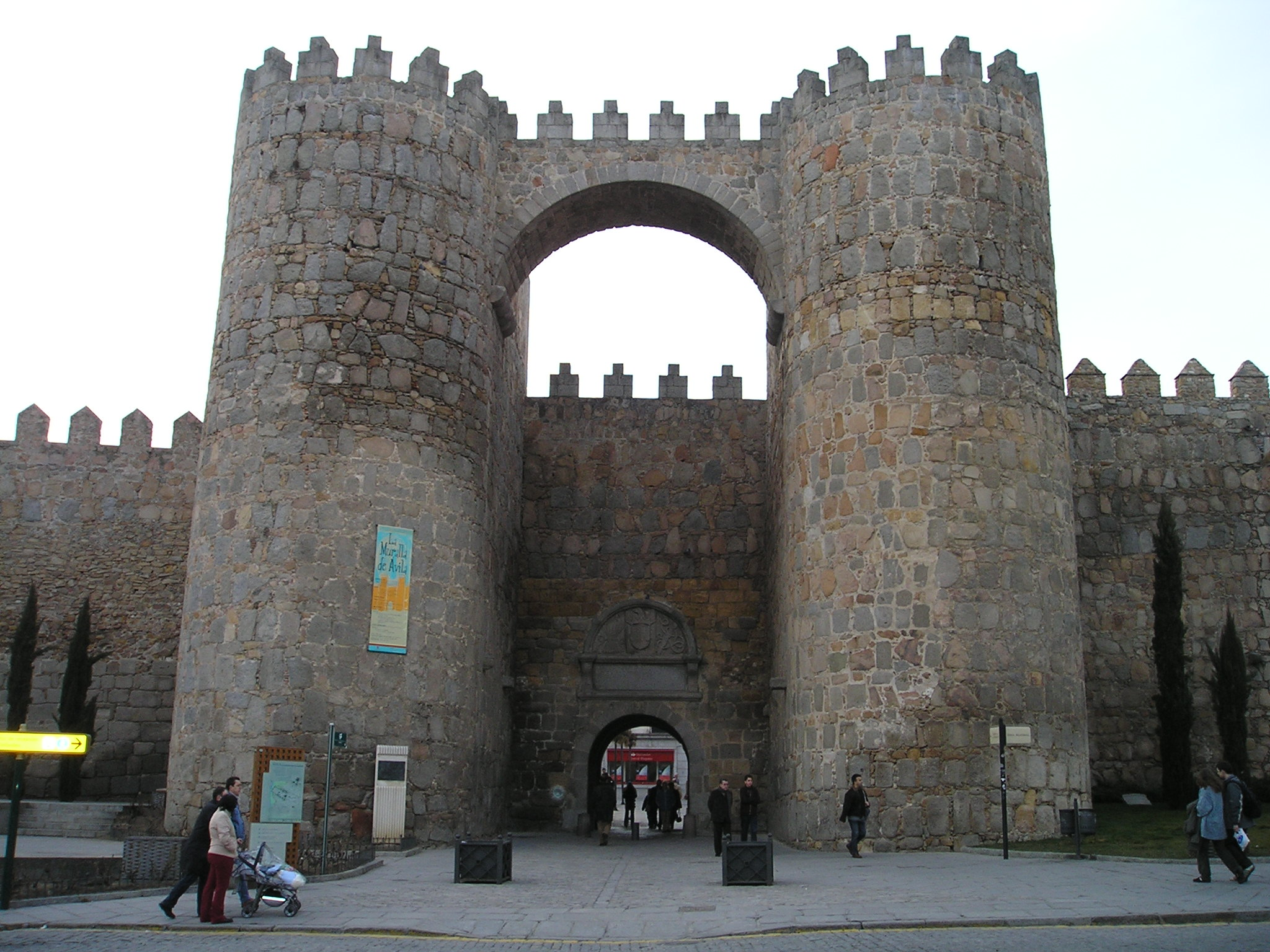
Puerta del Alcazar

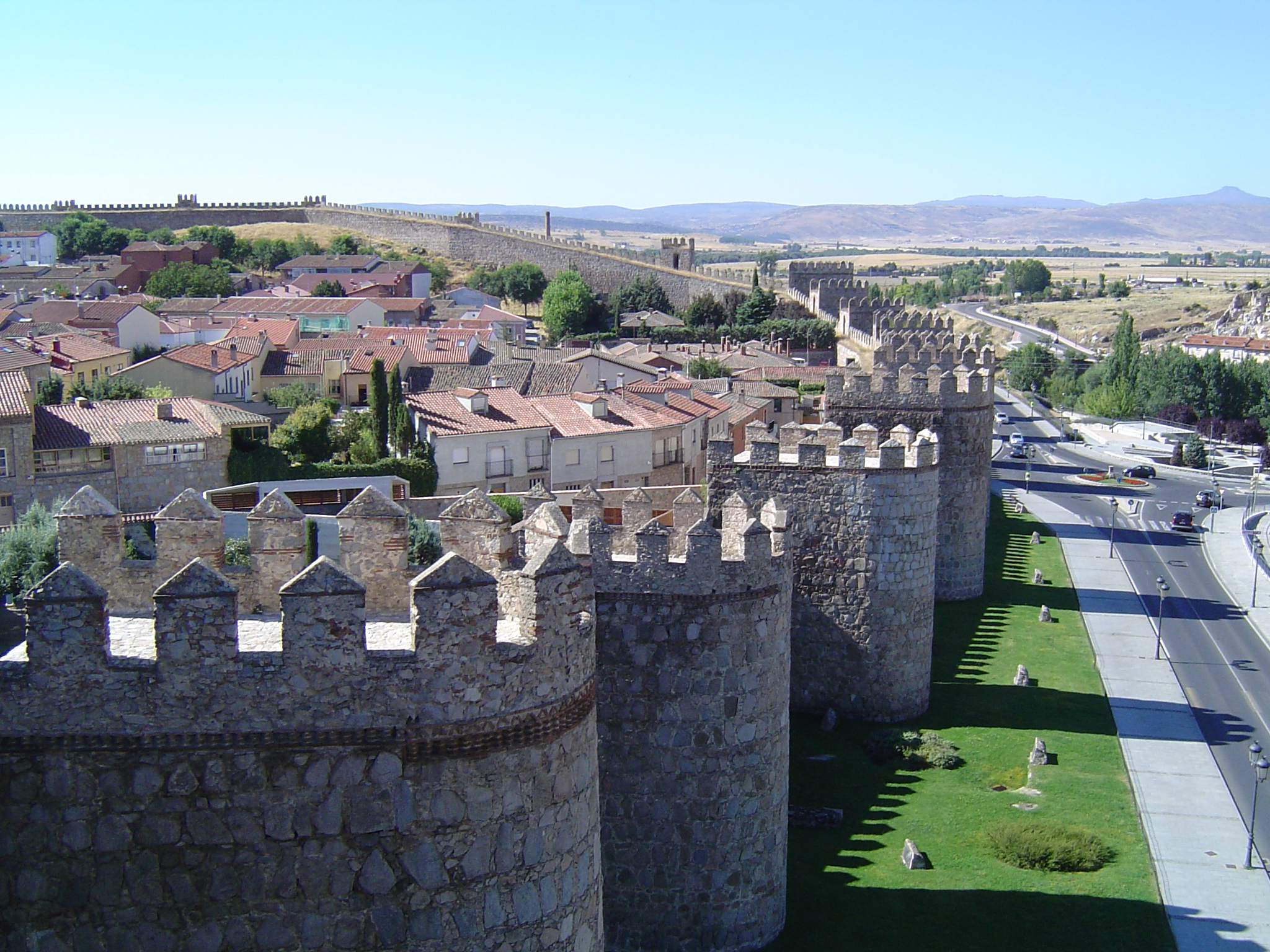
Walls of Ávila.

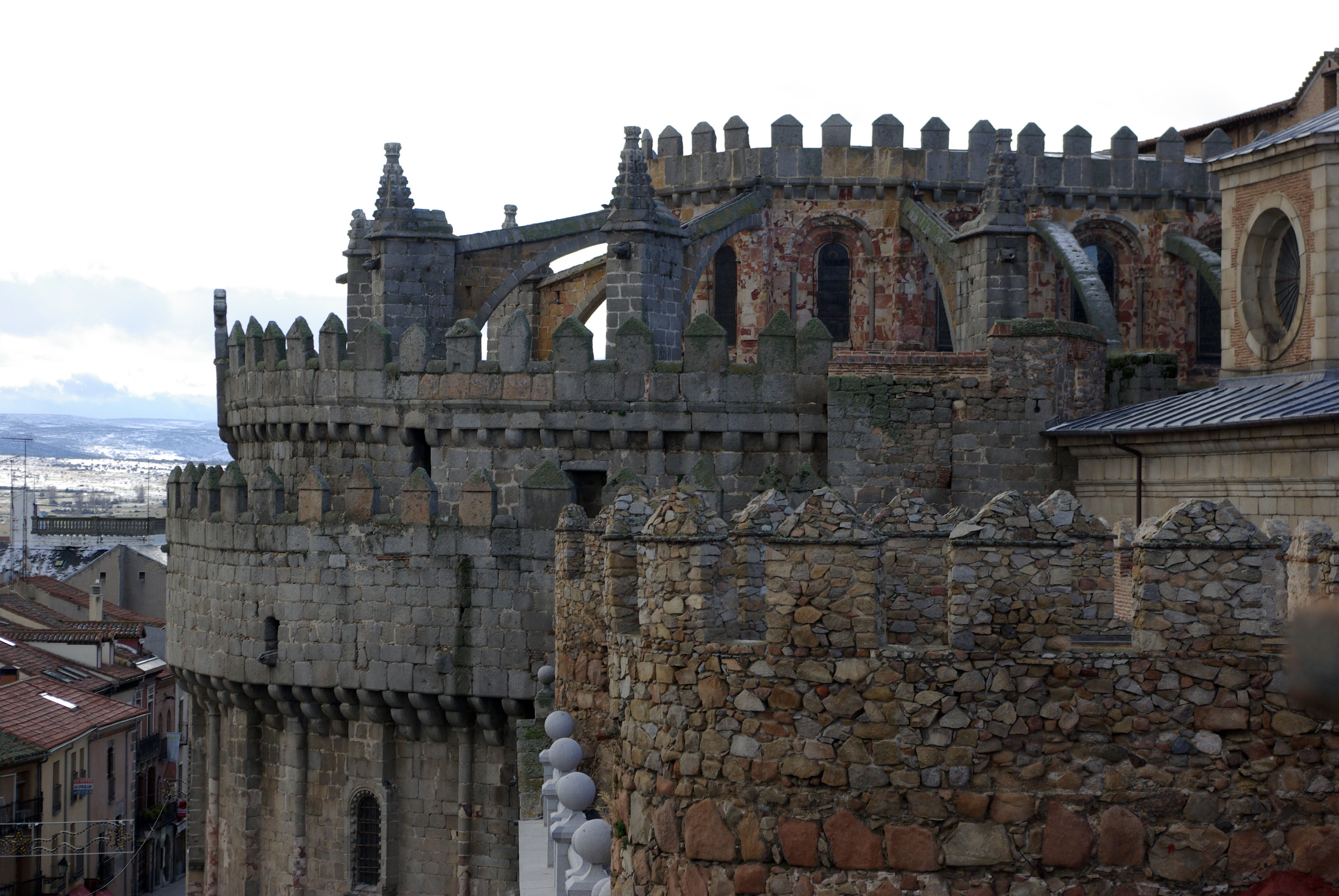
View of the apse from the east face of the walls.

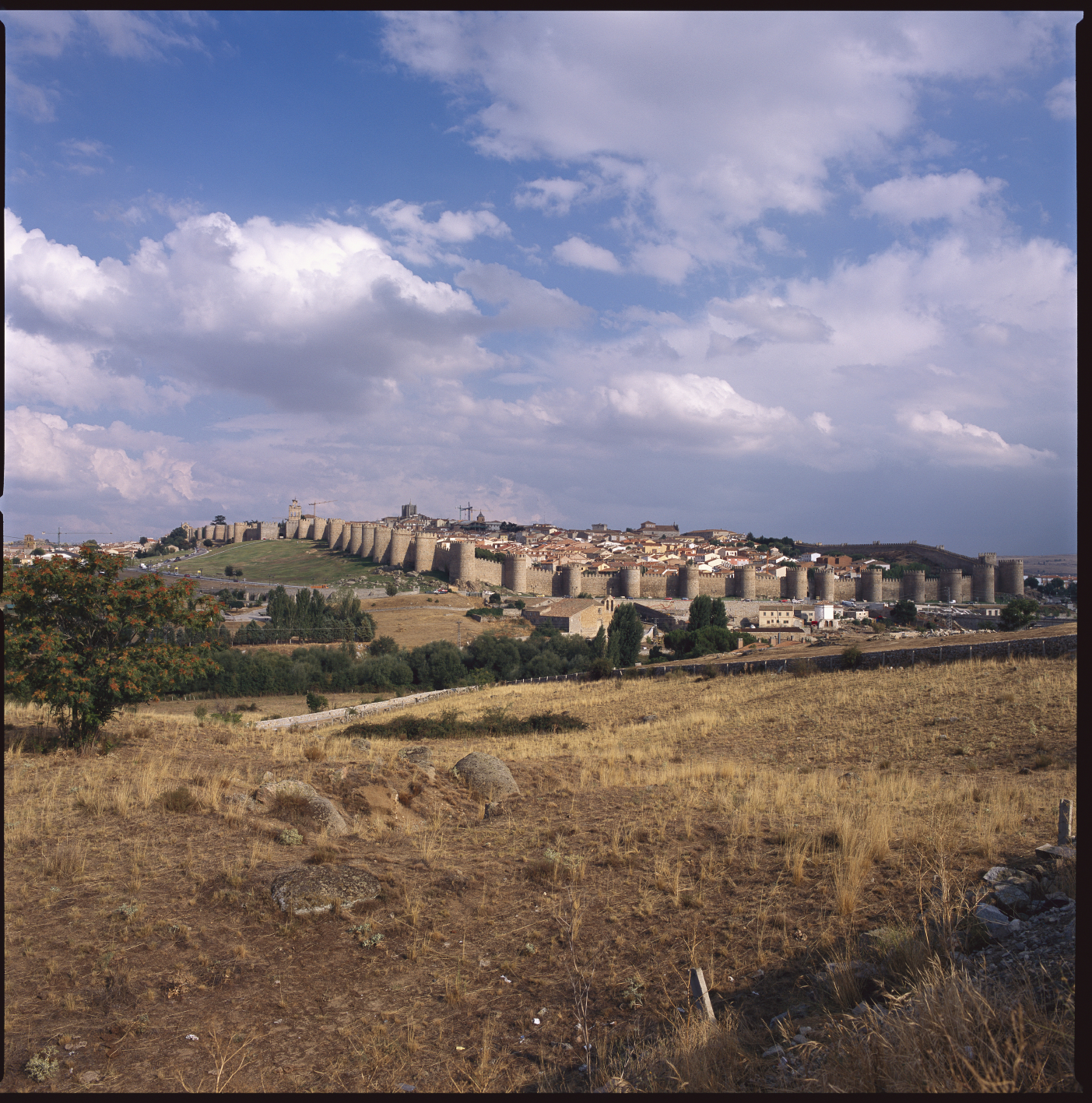
View of Walls of Ávila
