= Iglesia-convento de Santa Teresa =

- Iglesia-convento de Santa Teresa (Spanish)
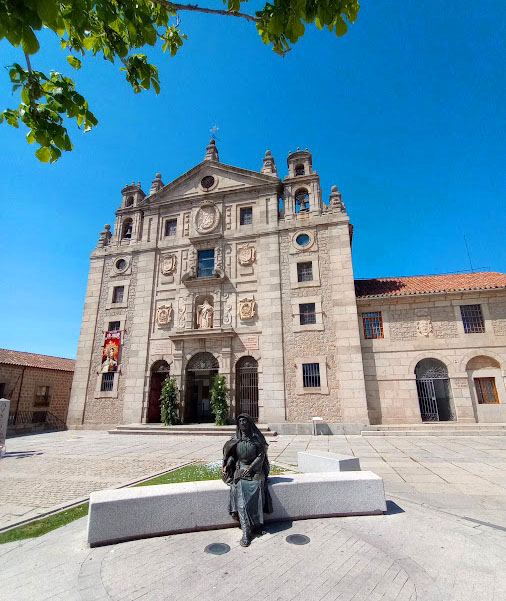

- Location within Spain
- 40.655419°N 4.702712°W
- Location: Ávila, Spain

Spanish Cultural Heritage
- Official name: Iglesia-convento de Santa Teresa
- Type: Non-movable
- Criteria: Monument
- Designated: 1886
- Reference no.: RI-51-0000051

The Iglesia-convento de Santa Teresa is a church and convent located in Ávila, Spain.

== Exterior ==
It was built by the Order of Discalced Carmelites, as outlined by friar Alonso de San José, in the Carmelite style in the first third of the 17th century, supposedly on the site where Saint Teresa of Ávila was born.

The central rectangle is divided in four bodies with a triangular pediment with a circle in the middle. The lowest part contains a statue of Saint Teresa. The part below the pediment shows a large coat-of-arms. The entrance consists of three rounded arches, the middle one flanked by pilasters.

== Interior ==
The interior of the church was built in the style of the Valladolid classicism. It consists of a nave and two lateral aisles, with a transept and a cupola above the crossing. The Chapel of Birth, alongside the presbytery, coincides with place where Teresa was born.

== Conservation ==
It is designated a Bien de Interés Cultural and has been protected since 1886.

== See also ==
- List of Bienes de Interés Cultural in the Province of Ávila
