= Regionalist Unity of Castile and León =

Regionalist Unity of Castile and León Unidad Regionalista de Castilla y León
- President: Ignacio Moratinos
- Founded: 1992
- Merger of: Democracia Regionalista de Castilla y León; Unidad Palentina; Acción Popular Burgalesa; Agrupación Independiente de Benavente; Partido Regionalista de Castilla y León de Salamanca sectors from CDS sectors from the Partido Nacionalista de Castilla y León and sectors from Unidad Comunera Castellana
- Headquarters: Valladolid
- Ideology: Progressivism; Castilian-Leonese regionalism

Website
- www.unidadregionalista.es

The Regionalist Unity of Castile and León (Spanish: Unidad Regionalista de Castilla y León, URCL) is a "regionalist, democratic, modern and innovative political party that, focusing on the principles of freedom, justice and solidarity, assumes the uncompromising defense of the legitimate interests of Castile and León."

It grew out of the union of several parties from Salamanca, Palencia, Burgos, Zamora and Valladolid, such as the Democracia Regionalista (Regionalist Democracy) of Castile and León or the Unidad Palentina (Palentine Unit). The first local and regional elections in which it took part was in 1995, participating, since then, in all municipal, regional and national elections held, except in 2004.

== Castile and Leon regionalism ==
The URCL defines itself as a centrist, "regionalist, democratic, modern and innovative" constitutional political party that is founded on the principles of freedom, justice and solidarity. Its interest is in the protection of the legitimate interests that affect Castile and León.

The party rejects federalism and independence, but demands autonomous status with the same powers as the so-called historical communities, and decentralization of these powers to county councils and regions.

== Political involvement ==
Since its founding in 1992, the URCL goes to Villalar de los Comuneros annually on April 23 to celebrate Castile and León Day. It has also participated in other events, rallies and conferences. It was in favor of the Salamanca - Madrid Highway. It participated in the First Debate Forum on "The Future of Castilianism", held in Burgos in October 2003. It was in favor of the Civil War Archive unit in Salamanca. URCL was in favor of the Duero Highway, and the Toro de la Vega. The party opposed the placement of nuclear waste (ATC) in Castile and León, and drafted a shared program of urgent action in certain matters affecting Valladolid and surrounding municipalities, convened meetings convened for influential parties in the Government of Valladolid and Alfoz.

== Election results ==
=== Autonomous elections ===
- 2011 Castile and León autonomous elections: 1,428 votes (0.10%) with three candidatures presented by the Palencia province (0.34%), Valladolid (0.24%) and Salamanca (0.18%).
- 2007 Castile and León autonomous elections: 914 votes (0.06%); Only attending and presenting candidature in Valladolid (0.30%).
- 2003 Castile and León autonomous elections: 5,387 votes (0.35%);
- 1999 Castile and León autonomous elections: 10,985 votes (0.76%);
- 1995 Castile and León autonomous elections: 6,308 votes (0.41%).

=== Municipal elections ===
- 2011 Municipal elections: 1,655 votes (0.11%), with 12 councilors, governing in Cevico de la Torre and Castromonte, in the final pact with the PSOE ruling for two years; representation in Bernuy de Zapardiel, Aldeamayor de San Martín, Brahojos de Medina, Membrillar and Ataquines.
- 2007 Municipal elections: 1,772 votes (0.12%), with 18 councilors. As a result of the elections, they held the mayoralties of Membrillar in Palencia, Bernuy-Zapardiel in Ávila and from September 2009 the mayoralty of Aldeamayor de San Martín in Valladolid. The deputies were spread throughout the provinces of Ávila, Palencia, Salamanca and Valladolid.
- 2003 Municipal elections: 7,452 votes (0.48%), 55 councilors and the mayoralties of Alcazarén, Aldeamayor de San Martín and Bustillo de Chaves in Valladolid, Villota del Páramo in Palencia and Horcajo Medianero, Palaciosrubios and San Pelayo de Guareña in Salamanca. The rest of the deputies were spread throughout the provinces of Salamanca, Valladolid, Palencia and Ávila: Santa Marta de Tormes, Cigales, Guijuelo, Mayorga, Ituero de Azaba, Fuente el Sol, Brahojos de Medina, Villarino de los Aires, Bernuy de Zapardiel, Santibáñez de Béjar... As a summary of the 2003 municipal elections, the party obtained a deputy in the province of Ávila, two in Palencia, 41 in Salamanca and 17 in Valladolid.
- 1999 Municipal elections: 13,041 votes (0.90%) and 124 councilors.
- 1995 Municipal elections: 10,004 votes (0.65%) and 98 councilors.

=== Congress of Deputies elections ===
- 2011: 709 votes with candidacies for Valladolid and Palencia.
- 2008: 423 votes with only one candidacy for Valladolid.
- 2004: The candidacies were withdrawn at the last minute because of the March 11 terrorist attacks.
- 2000: 5,537 votes (0.02%).
- 1996: 4,061 votes (0.02%).
- 1993: 2,715 votes (0.01%).

=== Senate elections ===
- 2011: 3,612 votes with candidacies in Palencia and Valladolid.
- 2008: 2,563 votes with candidacies in Salamanca, Palencia and Valladolid.
- 2004: The candidacies were withdrawn at the last minute because of the March 11 terrorist attacks.
- 2000: 14,362 votes with candidacies in Ávila, Burgos, Palencia, Salamanca, Segovia, Soria, Valladolid and Zamora.

== Bibliography ==
- "Regionalismo y autonomía en Castilla y León". Junta de Castilla y León (2004). J.A. Blanco Rguez. (Coord.).
- "Castilla y León en democracia. Partidos, elecciones y personal político 1977-2007". Junta de Castilla y León (2007). M. González, J.V. Pelaz y P. Pérez.
