= Sub-national opinion polling for the 2016 Spanish general election =

In the run up to the 2016 Spanish general election, various organisations carried out opinion polling to gauge voting intention in autonomous communities and constituencies in Spain during the term of the 11th Cortes Generales. Results of such polls are displayed in this article. The date range for these opinion polls is from the previous general election, held on 20 December 2015, to the day the next election was held, on 26 June 2016.

Voting intention estimates refer mainly to a hypothetical Congress of Deputies election. Polls are listed in reverse chronological order, showing the most recent first and using the dates when the survey fieldwork was done, as opposed to the date of publication. Where the fieldwork dates are unknown, the date of publication is given instead. The highest percentage figure in each polling survey is displayed with its background shaded in the leading party's colour. If a tie ensues, this is applied to the figures with the highest percentages. The "Lead" columns on the right shows the percentage-point difference between the parties with the highest percentages in a given poll.

Refusals are generally excluded from the party vote percentages, while question wording and the treatment of "don't know" responses and those not intending to vote may vary between polling organisations. When available, seat projections are displayed below the percentages in a smaller font.

== Autonomous communities ==
=== Andalusia ===
Color key:

Exit poll

Polling firm/Commissioner	Fieldwork date	Sample size	Turnout	PSOE	PP	Podemos	C's	IULV	Unidos Podemos	Lead
2016 general election	26 Jun 2016	—N/a	66.1	31.2; 20	33.5; 23	(Note: Within Unidos Podemos.)	13.6; 7		18.6; 11	2.3
Sigma Dos/RTVE–FORTA	26 Jun 2016	?	?	32.1; 21/22	28.6; 19/21		12.0; 4/6		22.6; 14/15	3.5
GIPEyOP	6–20 Jun 2016	696	?	30.2; 20	30.4; 21		14.5; 7		22.6; 13	0.2
Sigma Dos/El Mundo	9–16 Jun 2016	?	?	28.0; 18/19	33.0; 21/23		13.0; 7/8		23.0; 12/14	5.0
DYM/El Confidencial	14–15 Jun 2016	?	?	? 19/20	? 19		? 8		? 14/15	?
NC Report/La Razón	31 May–9 Jun 2016	2,300	67.4	30.4; 21	30.0; 21		14.4; 7		21.7; 12	0.4
CADPEA/UGR	18 Jan–9 Feb 2016	1,200	74.8	29.4	31.0	16.9	15.2	5.3	–	1.6
CIS	4–22 May 2016	2,858	?	? 20	? 20		? 8		? 13	Tie
2015 general election	20 Dec 2015	—N/a	69.1	31.5; 22	29.1; 21	16.9; 10	13.8; 8	5.8; 0	–	2.4

=== Aragon ===
Color key:

Exit poll

Polling firm/Commissioner	Fieldwork date	Sample size	Turnout	PP	PSOE	Podemos	C's	IU–UPeC	PAR	CHA	Unidos Podemos	Lead
2016 general election	26 Jun 2016	—N/a	69.9	35.8; 6	24.8; 4		16.2; 1		(Note: Within PP.)	–	19.7; 2	11.0
Sigma Dos/RTVE–FORTA	26 Jun 2016	?	?	33.5; 5/6	23.4; 3/4		14.2; 1			–	23.3; 3	10.1
GIPEyOP	6–20 Jun 2016	188	?	31.8; 4	22.0; 4		18.0; 1			–	25.5; 4	6.3
Sigma Dos/El Mundo	9–16 Jun 2016	?	?	34.0; 4/5	21.0; 3/4		17.0; 1			–	24.0; 4	10.0
DYM/El Confidencial	14–15 Jun 2016	?	?	? 4/5	? 4		? 1			–	? 3/4	?
A+M/Heraldo de Aragón	13–15 Jun 2016	1,600	64.7	32.7; 4/6	25.6; 4		17.3; 1/3			–	21.5; 2/4	7.1
NC Report/La Razón	6–15 Jun 2016	800	72.3	33.6; 4/6	22.9; 3/4		15.2; 1			–	24.3; 3/4	9.3
CIS	4–22 May 2016	840	?	? 4	? 3/4		? 2			–	? 3/4	?
2015 general election	20 Dec 2015	—N/a	72.6	31.3; 6	23.0; 4	18.6; 2	17.2; 1	6.2; 0		(Note: Within UPeC.)	–	8.3

=== Asturias ===
Polling firm/Commissioner	Fieldwork date	Sample size	Turnout	PP	PSOE	Podemos	C's	IU–UPeC	FAC	Unidos Podemos	Lead
2016 general election	26 Jun 2016	—N/a	61.1	35.3; 3	24.9; 2		12.6; 1			23.9; 2	10.4
GIPEyOP	6–20 Jun 2016	97	?	29.5; 3	25.2; 2		16.4; 1			26.6; 2	2.9
NC Report/La Razón	18 Jun 2016	?	?	31.5; 3	22.9; 2		13.0; 1			28.6; 2	2.9
Sigma Dos/El Mundo	9–16 Jun 2016	?	?	34.0; 3	23.0; 2		15.0; 1			25.0; 2	9.0
DYM/El Confidencial	14–15 Jun 2016	?	?	? 2/3	? 2		? 1			? 2/3	Tie
Asturbarómetro/La Nueva España	20 May–12 Jun 2016	405	?	30.6; 3	23.8; 2		12.2; 1			28.2; 2	2.4
Metroscopia/El País	6 Jun 2016	600	69	32.6; 3	20.9; 2		14.5; 1			28.8; 2	3.8
CIS	4–22 May 2016	410	?	? 3	? 2		? 1			? 2	?
2015 general election	20 Dec 2015	—N/a	63.8	30.1; 3	23.3; 2	21.3; 2	13.6; 1	8.4; 0		–	6.8

=== Balearic Islands ===
Color key:

Exit poll

Polling firm/Commissioner	Fieldwork date	Sample size	Turnout	PP	Podemos	PSOE	C's	Més	El Pi	IU–UPeC	Units Podem Més	Lead
2016 general election	26 Jun 2016	—N/a	60.7	35.1; 3	(Note: Within UPM.)	20.1; 2	14.6; 1		–		25.4; 2	9.7
Sigma Dos/RTVE–FORTA	26 Jun 2016	?	?	30.7; 2/3		21.1; 2	11.8; 1		–		28.9; 2/3	1.8
GIPEyOP	6–20 Jun 2016	65	?	31.6; 3		20.8; 2	15.9; 1		–		29.0; 2	2.6
GADeso	19 Jun 2016	900	?	29.0– 30.0; 3		17.0– 18.0; 1	13.0– 14.0; 1		–		28.0– 29.0; 3	1.0
IBES/Última Hora	6–17 Jun 2016	1,000	?	32.0; 3		20.0; 1/2	13.0; 1		–		29.0; 2/3	3.0
Sigma Dos/El Mundo	9–16 Jun 2016	?	?	30.0; 2/3		17.0; 1/2	17.0; 1		–		32.0; 3	2.0
DYM/El Confidencial	14–15 Jun 2016	?	?	? 3		? 1	? 1		–		? 3	Tie
IBES/Última Hora	6–10 Jun 2016	500	?	30.4; 3		19.2; 1	15.9; 1		–		29.4; 3	1.0
Metroscopia/El País	3–6 Jun 2016	600	63	27.4; 2/3		17.8; 1/2	16.6; 1		–		33.0; 3	5.6
NC Report/La Razón	31 May–6 Jun 2016	400	59.7	30.9; 3		19.2; 1	15.7; 1		–		30.9; 3	Tie
IBES/Última Hora	30 May–3 Jun 2016	500	?	30.6; 3		20.0; 1/2	14.7; 1		–		28.6; 2/3	2.0
IBES/Última Hora	23–26 May 2016	500	?	31.1; 3		20.3; 1/2	13.0; 1		–		29.2; 2/3	1.9
CIS	4–22 May 2016	369	?	? 3		? 1	? 1		–		? 3	Tie
IBES/Última Hora	16–19 May 2016	500	?	29.6; 3		20.0; 1/2	14.8; 1		–		27.8; 2/3	1.8
IBES/Última Hora	11–13 May 2016	500	?	29.0; 3		20.4; 1/2	15.5; 1		–		27.0; 2/3	2.0
IBES/Última Hora	4–6 May 2016	500	?	28.8; 3		19.5; 2	15.0; 1		–		27.5; 2	1.3
IBES/Última Hora	7–17 Mar 2016	900	?	27.0; 2	20.0; 2	23.0; 2	18.0; 2	6.0; 0	4.0; 0	2.0; 0	–	4.0
2015 general election	20 Dec 2015	—N/a	63.3	29.1; 3	23.1; 2	18.3; 2	14.8; 1	7.0; 0	2.7; 0	2.4; 0	–	6.0

=== Basque Country ===
Color key:

Exit poll

Polling firm/Commissioner	Fieldwork date	Sample size	Turnout	Podemos	PNV	EH Bildu	PSE–EE	PP	C's	IU–UPeC	Unidos Podemos	Lead
2016 general election	26 Jun 2016	—N/a	65.2		24.9; 5	13.3; 2	14.2; 3	12.9; 2	3.5; 0		29.1; 6	4.2
Sigma Dos/EITB	26 Jun 2016	?	?		25.8; 5/6	18.0; 3/4	11.2; 1/3	8.3; 1	3.5; 0		29.5; 6	3.7
GIPEyOP	6–20 Jun 2016	248	?		22.4; 4	15.9; 2	17.8; 4	12.5; 2	4.1; 0		26.2; 6	3.8
Sigma Dos/El Mundo	9–16 Jun 2016	?	?		24.0; 4/6	14.0; 2	12.0; 2	12.0; 2	4.0; 0		31.0; 6/8	7.0
DYM/El Confidencial	14–15 Jun 2016	?	?		? 5/6	? 2	? 2	? 2	? 0		? 6/7	?
Metroscopia/El País	9–10 Jun 2016	1,800	69		23.0; 5	13.3; 2	12.6; 2	11.9; 2	4.1; 0		31.7; 7	8.7
Gizaker/EITB	8–9 Jun 2016	1,200	?		25.4; 5/6	15.4; 2	13.4; 2	10.4; 1/2	4.1; 0		29.8; 7	4.4
NC Report/La Razón	30 May–3 Jun 2016	825	64.6		23.5; 4/6	14.7; 2	13.2; 2/3	11.5; 2	4.5; 0		29.2; 5/7	5.7
Ikertalde/GPS	23 May–2 Jun 2016	2,310	69.5		24.1; 5	15.2; 2	13.7; 2	11.7; 2	3.5; 0		29.6; 7	5.5
CIS	4–22 May 2016	1,230	?		? 5	? 3	? 1	? 2	? 0		? 7	?
SyM Consulting	5–20 May 2016	1,274	?		24.2; 5	14.6; 2	16.1; 2/3	11.2; 2/3	4.5; 0		27.5; 6	3.3
Gizaker/EITB	11–12 May 2016	1,200	?		25.4; 5/6	15.5; 2	13.1; 2	10.5; 2	4.5; 0		28.8; 6/7	3.4
Gizaker/EITB	13–14 Apr 2016	1,200	67.0	25.3; 5/6	26.9; 6	15.8; 2	12.4; 2/3	10.2; 2	3.7; 0	4.1; 0	–	1.6
2015 general election	20 Dec 2015	—N/a	69.0	26.0; 5	24.7; 6	15.1; 2	13.2; 3	11.6; 2	4.1; 0	2.9; 0	–	1.3

=== Canary Islands ===
Polling firm/Commissioner	Fieldwork date	Sample size	Turnout	PP	Podemos	PSOE	C's	CC	IU–UPeC	NCa	Unidos Podemos	Lead
2016 general election	26 Jun 2016	—N/a	59.1	34.1; 6		22.5; 3	12.0; 2	8.0; 1		(Note: Within PSOE.)	20.3; 3	11.6
GIPEyOP	6–20 Jun 2016	80	?	30.7; 4		22.0; 4	16.0; 2	? 0			27.6; 5	3.1
NC Report/La Razón	18 Jun 2016	?	?	29.2; 4/5		21.9; 4	11.1; 1	7.4; 1			26.0; 4/5	3.2
Hamalgama Métrica/La Provincia	8–17 Jun 2016	2,000	?	30.9; 4/5		21.5; 2/4	12.2; 1/2	6.4; 1			25.9; 4/5	5.0
Sigma Dos/El Mundo	9–16 Jun 2016	?	?	29.0; 4/6		23.0; 4	14.0; 1/3	7.0; 0/1			25.0; 4	4.0
DYM/El Confidencial	14–15 Jun 2016	?	?	? 4		? 3	? 2	? 1			? 5	?
Metroscopia/El País	2–3 Jun 2016	1,200	?	30.1; 4/6		21.6; 3/4	13.1; 2	5.7; 0/1			26.0; 4/5	4.1
CIS	4–22 May 2016	794	?	? 5		? 3	? 2	? 0			? 5	Tie
2015 general election	20 Dec 2015	—N/a	60.3	28.5; 5	23.3; 3	22.0; 4	11.4; 2	8.2; 1	3.1; 0		–	5.2

=== Cantabria ===
Polling firm/Commissioner	Fieldwork date	Sample size	Turnout	PP	PSOE	Podemos	C's	IU–UPeC	Unidos Podemos	Lead
2016 general election	26 Jun 2016	—N/a	68.5	41.5; 2	23.5; 1		14.4; 1		17.7; 1	18.0
GIPEyOP	6–20 Jun 2016	39	?	38.0; 2	21.6; 1		17.1; 1		21.7; 1	16.3
Sigma Dos/El Mundo	9–16 Jun 2016	?	?	39.0; 2	19.0; 1		19.0; 1		21.0; 1	18.0
DYM/El Confidencial	14–15 Jun 2016	?	?	? 2	? 1		? 1		? 1	?
NC Report/La Razón	30 May–5 Jun 2016	400	66.9	37.4; 2	23.1; 1		14.9; 1		21.3; 1	14.3
CIS	4–22 May 2016	320	?	? 2	? 1		? 1		? 1	?
2015 general election	20 Dec 2015	—N/a	71.0	36.9; 2	22.4; 1	17.9; 1	15.2; 1	4.4; 0	–	14.5

=== Castile and León ===
Polling firm/Commissioner	Fieldwork date	Sample size	Turnout	PP	PSOE	C's	Podemos	IU–UPeC	Unidos Podemos	Lead
2016 general election	26 Jun 2016	—N/a	68.8	44.3; 18	23.1; 9	14.2; 1			15.6; 3	21.2
GIPEyOP	6–20 Jun 2016	1,212	?	40.7; 17	20.9; 8	16.4; 1			20.6; 5	19.8
NC Report/La Razón	18 Jun 2016	?	?	40.4; 17	22.0; 9	14.2; 1/2			19.1; 3/4	18.4
Sigma Dos/El Mundo	9–16 Jun 2016	?	?	42.0; 17/18	19.0; 5/9	16.0; 1/2			20.0; 3/7	22.0
DYM/El Confidencial	14–15 Jun 2016	?	?	? 17	? 9	? 2			? 3	?
CIS	4–22 May 2016	2,161	?	? 16/17	? 7/8	? 1/2			? 5/6	?
2015 general election	20 Dec 2015	—N/a	71.2	39.1; 17	22.5; 9	15.4; 3	15.1; 3	4.6; 0	–	16.6

=== Castilla–La Mancha ===
Color key:

Exit poll

Polling firm/Commissioner	Fieldwork date	Sample size	Turnout	PP	PSOE	C's	Podemos	IU–UPeC	Unidos Podemos	Lead
2016 general election	26 Jun 2016	—N/a	71.8	42.7; 12	27.3; 7	13.0; 0			14.7; 2	15.4
Sigma Dos/RTVE–FORTA	26 Jun 2016	?	?	36.7; 8/10	28.0; 6/7	12.8; 1/2			18.4; 4	8.7
GIPEyOP	6–20 Jun 2016	278	?	41.1; 10	25.3; 6	13.2; 1			19.0; 4	15.8
Sigma Dos/El Mundo	9–16 Jun 2016	?	?	40.0; 11	24.0; 5	14.0; 1/2			19.0; 3/4	16.0
DYM/El Confidencial	14–15 Jun 2016	?	?	? 9	? 7	? 1			? 4	?
NC Report/La Razón	6–15 Jun 2016	1,350	72.8	39.3; 9/10	27.1; 6/7	13.6; 0/1			17.3; 4	12.2
CIS	4–22 May 2016	1,243	?	? 11	? 6	? 1			? 3	?
2015 general election	20 Dec 2015	—N/a	75.3	38.1; 10	28.4; 7	13.8; 3	13.7; 1	3.6; 0	–	9.7

=== Catalonia ===
Color key:

Exit poll

Polling firm/Commissioner	Fieldwork date	Sample size	Turnout	En Comú Podem	ERC–CatSí	PSC	DiL CDC	C's	PP	Lead
2016 general election	26 Jun 2016	—N/a	63.4	24.5; 12	18.2; 9	16.1; 7	13.9; 8	10.9; 5	13.4; 6	6.3
Sigma Dos/RTVE–FORTA	26 Jun 2016	?	?	28.5; 14/16	20.8; 11/12	14.4; 7	9.7; 5	10.5; 4	10.4; 4/5	7.7
GIPEyOP	6–20 Jun 2016	293	?	23.7; 11	17.7; 9	17.6; 8	13.3; 8	12.8; 5	12.5; 6	6.0
GESOP/El Periódico	14–18 Jun 2016	800	?	27.5; 12/14	19.5; 9/11	15.2; 7/8	11.5; 6/7	11.4; 5	11.5; 5	8.0
GAD3/La Vanguardia	13–16 Jun 2016	800	?	28.4; 13/14	15.7; 8/9	15.1; 7/8	12.1; 6/7	13.2; 5/6	11.8; 5/6	12.7
Sigma Dos/El Mundo	9–16 Jun 2016	?	?	27.0; 13/15	16.0; 8/9	15.0; 7	12.0; 5/6	13.0; 6	13.0; 6	11.0
DYM/El Confidencial	14–15 Jun 2016	?	?	? 12	? 9/10	? 7/8	? 8	? 6	? 4	?
A+M/20minutos	13–15 Jun 2016	800	70.3	30.3; 13/15	16.8; 8/9	16.5; 7/8	10.8; 6/7	12.1; 6/8	10.1; 3/5	13.5
GESOP/El Periódico	3–7 Jun 2016	800	?	27.0; 13	15.7; 8/9	16.0; 8	11.4; 5/6	14.7; 7	10.9; 4/5	11.0
NC Report/La Razón	30 May–3 Jun 2016	825	65.0	26.6; 12/13	15.9; 8/9	15.3; 8	12.7; 6/7	14.4; 6/7	11.5; 5	10.7
CDC	31 May 2016	?	67	? 14	? 8	? 7	? 9	? 6	? 3	?
ERC	26 May 2016	1,500	66	26.0; 12/13	19.0; 11/12	13.0; 5	13.0; 7	14.0; 6	11.0; 5/6	7.0
CIS	4–22 May 2016	2,057	?	? 14/15	? 8/9	? 8	? 6/7	? 5	? 4/5	?
Opinòmetre/CEO	22 Feb–8 Mar 2016	1,500	68	25.5; 12	19.2; 10/11	15.2; 7	12.4; 6/7	14.5; 7	10.0; 4	6.3
2015 general election	20 Dec 2015	—N/a	68.6	24.7; 12	16.0; 9	15.7; 8	15.1; 8	13.0; 5	11.1; 5	8.7

=== Extremadura ===
Polling firm/Commissioner	Fieldwork date	Sample size	Turnout	PSOE	PP	Podemos	C's	IU–UPeC	Unidos Podemos	Lead
2016 general election	26 Jun 2016	—N/a	68.6	34.5; 4	39.9; 5		10.5; 0		13.1; 1	5.4
GIPEyOP	6–20 Jun 2016	65	?	29.8; 3	36.7; 4		12.6; 1		18.7; 2	6.9
Sigma Dos/El Mundo	9–16 Jun 2016	?	?	31.0; 3	37.0; 4/5		12.0; 0/1		17.0; 2	6.0
DYM/El Confidencial	14–15 Jun 2016	?	?	? 3	? 4		? 1		? 2	?
NC Report/La Razón	31 May–6 Jun 2016	575	69.9	35.4; 4	34.6; 4		? 0		15.5; 2	0.8
CIS	4–22 May 2016	480	?	? 4	? 4		? 1		? 1	Tie
2015 general election	20 Dec 2015	—N/a	72.2	36.0; 5	34.8; 4	12.7; 1	11.4; 0	3.0; 0	–	1.2

=== Galicia ===
Color key:

Exit poll

Polling firm/Commissioner	Fieldwork date	Sample size	Turnout	PP	En Marea	PSdeG–PSOE	C's	BNG	Lead
2016 general election	26 Jun 2016	—N/a	58.8	41.5; 12	22.2; 5	22.2; 6	8.6; 0	2.9; 0	19.3
Sigma Dos/CRTVG	26 Jun 2016	10,000	?	36.9; 10	25.7; 6/7	22.1; 5/6	8.1; 1	3.6; 0	11.2
GIPEyOP	6–20 Jun 2016	123	?	37.8; 10	26.5; 6	20.2; 6	9.0; 1	4.7; 0	11.3
NC Report/La Razón	18 Jun 2016	?	?	38.9; 10	24.5; 6	20.9; 6	8.7; 1	? 0	14.4
Sigma Dos/El Mundo	9–16 Jun 2016	?	?	37.0; 10/11	25.0; 6	22.0; 5	10.0; 1/2	? 0	12.0
DYM/El Confidencial	14–15 Jun 2016	?	?	? 10	? 6	? 6	? 1	? 0	?
Sondaxe/La Voz de Galicia	6–14 Jun 2016	1,400	60	39.3; 11	26.8; 7	19.8; 5	8.1; 0	3.7; 0	12.5
Sondaxe/La Voz de Galicia	24–31 May 2016	500	60	37.0; 10	29.0; 8	17.3; 4	9.8; 1	3.3; 0	8.0
CIS	4–22 May 2016	1,256	?	? 10	? 7	? 5	? 1	? 0	?
Metroscopia/El País	19–22 Apr 2016	2,000	?	36.7; 10	26.2; 6	18.7; 5	11.6; 2	3.1; 0	10.5
GAD3/ABC	4–6 Apr 2016	807	?	38.3; 10	20.8; 5	20.5; 6	12.0; 2	4.5; 0	17.5
Sondaxe/La Voz de Galicia	5–9 Mar 2016	?	?	39.9; 10	23.2; 6	21.6; 6	8.9; 1	4.1; 0	16.7
2015 general election	20 Dec 2015	—N/a	61.5	37.1; 10	25.0; 6	21.3; 6	9.1; 1	4.3; 0	12.1

=== La Rioja ===
Polling firm/Commissioner	Fieldwork date	Sample size	Turnout	PP	PSOE	Podemos	C's	IU–UPeC	Unidos Podemos	Lead
2016 general election	26 Jun 2016	—N/a	70.6	42.6; 2	24.3; 1		14.0; 0		16.6; 1	18.3
GIPEyOP	6–20 Jun 2016	37	?	38.9; 2	22.0; 1		15.8; 0		21.0; 1	16.9
NC Report/La Razón	18 Jun 2016	?	?	39.9; 2	23.1; 1		14.4; 0		19.2; 1	16.8
Sigma Dos/El Mundo	9–16 Jun 2016	?	?	37.0; 2	25.0; 1		16.0; 0		19.0; 1	12.0
DYM/El Confidencial	14–15 Jun 2016	?	?	? 2	? 1		? 0		? 1	?
CIS	4–22 May 2016	256	?	? 2	? 1		? 0		? 1	?
2015 general election	20 Dec 2015	—N/a	72.4	38.3; 2	23.7; 1	15.8; 1	15.1; 0	4.2; 0	–	14.6

=== Madrid ===
Polling firm/Commissioner	Fieldwork date	Sample size	Turnout	PP	Podemos	C's	PSOE	IU–UPeC	Unidos Podemos	Lead
2016 general election	26 Jun 2016	—N/a	70.8	38.2; 15		17.8; 6	19.6; 7		21.3; 8	16.9
GIPEyOP	6–20 Jun 2016	918	?	31.2; 12		20.0; 7	19.4; 7		25.4; 10	6.8
Sigma Dos/El Mundo	9–16 Jun 2016	?	?	36.0; 13/14		20.0; 7/8	16.0; 6		25.0; 9	11.0
A+M/20minutos	15 Jun 2016	700	?	35.5; 13		18.7; 6/7	19.4; 7		26.7; 9/10	8.8
DYM/El Confidencial	14–15 Jun 2016	?	?	? 13		? 7	? 6		? 10	?
NC Report/La Razón	30 May–9 Jun 2016	600	70.4	34.8; 13		17.9; 7	17.5; 6		26.0; 10	8.8
JM&A/ctxt	8 Jun 2016	?	?	35.7; 13		17.1; 6	19.9; 8		24.2; 9	11.5
Metroscopia/El País	23 May 2016	800	72	35.0; 13/14		17.9; 6/7	17.6; 6/7		26.1; 10	8.9
CIS	4–22 May 2016	770	?	? 12		? 8	? 6		? 10	?
GAD3/ABC	14–29 Apr 2016	817	74	34.7; 13/14	18.8; 7	18.4; 7	17.9; 6/7	6.2; 2	–	15.9
Metroscopia/El País	15 Mar 2016	800	?	31.2; 12	17.2; 6	22.3; 8	18.6; 7	7.5; 3	–	8.9
2015 general election	20 Dec 2015	—N/a	74.1	33.4; 13	20.9; 8	18.8; 7	17.8; 6	5.3; 2	–	12.5

=== Murcia ===
Polling firm/Commissioner	Fieldwork date	Sample size	Turnout	PP	PSOE	C's	Podemos	IU–UPeC	Unidos Podemos	Lead
2016 general election	26 Jun 2016	—N/a	69.6	46.7; 5	20.3; 2	15.7; 2			14.5; 1	26.4
GIPEyOP	6–20 Jun 2016	155	?	40.2; 5	21.2; 2	16.0; 1			19.0; 2	19.0
Sigma Dos/El Mundo	9–16 Jun 2016	?	?	46.0; 5	17.0; 2	15.0; 1			20.0; 2	26.0
DYM/El Confidencial	14–15 Jun 2016	?	?	? 4	? 2	? 2			? 2	?
NC Report/La Razón	31 May–9 Jun 2016	400	69.7	42.1; 5	19.9; 2	16.8; 1			17.7; 2	22.2
CIS	4–22 May 2016	464	?	? 5	? 2	? 1			? 2	?
Metroscopia/El País	11 Apr 2016	600	73	39.0; 5	19.4; 2	20.0; 2	10.7; 1	6.5; 0	–	19.0
2015 general election	20 Dec 2015	—N/a	71.1	40.4; 5	20.3; 2	17.7; 2	15.2; 1	3.1; 0	–	20.1

=== Navarre ===
Color key:

Exit poll

Polling firm/Commissioner	Fieldwork date	Sample size	Turnout	PP	Podemos	PSOE	EH Bildu	GBai	C's	I–E	UPN	Unidos Podemos	Lead
2016 general election	26 Jun 2016	—N/a	67.4	31.9; 2		17.3; 1	9.4; 0	4.3; 0	6.1; 0			28.3; 2	3.6
Sigma Dos/EITB	26 Jun 2016	?	?	25.1; 2		14.1; 1	10.9; 0	4.8; 0	6.6; 0			34.4; 2	9.3
GIPEyOP	6–20 Jun 2016	38	?	31.5; 2		15.6; 1	7.0; 0	–	5.9; 0			32.5; 2	1.0
Sigma Dos/El Mundo	9–16 Jun 2016	?	?	31.0; 2		13.0; 1	12.0; 0	7.0; 0	6.0; 0			28.0; 2	3.0
DYM/El Confidencial	14–15 Jun 2016	?	?	? 2		? 1	? 0	? 0	? 0			? 2	Tie
CIES/Diario de Navarra	7–13 Jun 2016	800	71	27.5; 2		16.1; 1	9.3; 0	7.5; 0	8.9; 0			28.8; 2	1.3
NC Report/La Razón	6–11 Jun 2016	400	68.7	30.6; 2		15.4; 1	8.6; 0	8.1; 0	6.8; 0			26.5; 2	4.1
Metroscopia/El País	6 Jun 2016	600	71	28.8; 2		12.1; 0/1	8.2; 0	3.9; 0	8.1; 0			35.9; 2/3	7.1
SyM Consulting/Navarra.com	1–2 Jun 2016	522	?	33.3; 2		16.1; 1	10.5; 0	8.2; 0	? 0			28.6; 2	4.7
CIS	4–22 May 2016	334	?	? 2		? 1	? 0	? 0	? 0			? 2	Tie
2015 general election	20 Dec 2015	—N/a	70.9	28.9; 2	23.0; 2	15.5; 1	9.9; 0	8.7; 0	7.1; 0	4.1; 0		–	5.9

=== Valencian Community ===
Color key:

Exit poll

Polling firm/Commissioner	Fieldwork date	Sample size	Turnout	PP	ALV	PSOE	C's	IU–UPeC	Lead
2016 general election	26 Jun 2016	—N/a	72.4	35.4; 13	25.4; 9	20.8; 6	15.0; 5	(Note: Within ALV.)	10.0
Sigma Dos/RTVE–FORTA	26 Jun 2016	?	?	30.5; 11/12	31.6; 11/12	19.6; 6	12.9; 3/5		1.1
GIPEyOP	6–20 Jun 2016	5,701	?	33.8; 13	29.7; 9	19.1; 6	16.2; 5		4.1
Sigma Dos/El Mundo	9–16 Jun 2016	?	?	32.0; 11/12	31.0; 10/12	18.0; 6	15.0; 4/5		1.0
DYM/El Confidencial	14–15 Jun 2016	?	?	? 12	? 9	? 6	? 6		?
NC Report/La Razón	6–10 Jun 2016	925	74.0	32.3; 13	28.4; 9	19.0; 6	15.1; 5		3.9
Invest Group/Levante-EMV	31 May–7 Jun 2016	750	?	30.2; 10/11	31.3; 10/11	23.6; 8	11.8; 4		1.1
SyM Consulting/Valencia Plaza	2–5 Jun 2016	1,371	?	33.6; 10/12	28.0; 10	19.5; 6/8	15.2; 5		5.6
CIS	4–22 May 2016	1,306	?	? 11/12	? 9/10	? 7	? 5		?
2015 general election	20 Dec 2015	—N/a	74.8	31.3; 11	25.1; 9	19.8; 7	15.8; 5	4.2; 0	6.2

== Constituencies ==
=== A Coruña ===
Polling firm/Commissioner	Fieldwork date	Sample size	Turnout	PP	En Marea	PSdeG–PSOE	C's	BNG	Lead
2016 general election	26 Jun 2016	—N/a	59.9	40.1; 4	23.1; 2	21.8; 2	9.4; 0	3.0; 0	17.0
GIPEyOP	6–20 Jun 2016	63	?	36.2; 3	27.2; 2	19.5; 2	10.4; 1	5.3; 0	9.0
Sigma Dos/El Mundo	9–16 Jun 2016	?	?	34.0; 3	27.0; 2	22.0; 2	10.0; 1	? 0	7.0
DYM/El Confidencial	14–15 Jun 2016	?	?	? 3	? 2	? 2	? 1	? 0	?
Sondaxe/La Voz de Galicia	6–14 Jun 2016	400	?	39.2; 4	26.1; 2	20.0; 2	8.1; 0	4.1; 0	13.1
CIS	4–22 May 2016	400	?	? 3	? 2	? 2	? 1	? 0	?
Metroscopia/El País	19–20 Apr 2016	600	69	34.1; 3	26.9; 2	19.1; 2	11.5; 1	3.9; 0	7.2
GAD3/ABC	4–6 Apr 2016	?	?	? 3	? 2	? 2	? 1	? 0	?
Sondaxe/La Voz de Galicia	5–9 Mar 2016	?	?	38.8; 3	22.9; 2	22.9; 2	11.6; 1	? 0	15.9
2015 general election	20 Dec 2015	—N/a	62.7	35.5; 3	26.3; 2	20.4; 2	9.9; 1	4.5; 0	9.2

=== Álava ===
Color key:

Exit poll

Polling firm/Commissioner	Fieldwork date	Sample size	Turnout	Podemos	PP	PNV	PSE–EE	EH Bildu	C's	IU–UPeC	Unidos Podemos	Lead
2016 general election	26 Jun 2016	—N/a	66.5		20.4; 1	15.9; 1	15.7; 1	9.5; 0	5.0; 0		30.9; 1	10.5
Sigma Dos/EITB	26 Jun 2016	?	?		9.1; 0	16.9; 1	14.2; 0/1	14.5; 0/1	3.9; 0		38.3; 2	21.4
GIPEyOP	6–20 Jun 2016	33	?		19.1; 1	13.0; 0	18.2; 1	12.4; 0	6.3; 0		30.1; 2	11.0
Sigma Dos/El Mundo	9–16 Jun 2016	?	?		19.0; 1	17.0; 1	12.0; 0	10.0; 0	6.0; 0		32.0; 2	13.0
DYM/El Confidencial	14–15 Jun 2016	?	?		? 1	? 1	? 0	? 0	? 0		? 2	?
Metroscopia/El País	9–10 Jun 2016	600	?		19.4; 1	15.2; 1	12.8; 0	10.2; 0	5.6; 0		31.1; 2	11.7
Gizaker/EITB	8–9 Jun 2016	400	?		17.9; 1	16.1; 1	13.1; 0	12.0; 0	7.4; 0		32.2; 2	14.3
NC Report/La Razón	30 May–3 Jun 2016	?	?		18.8; 1	14.6; 0/1	14.0; 0/1	? 0	? 0		31.6; 1/2	12.8
Ikertalde/GPS	23 May–2 Jun 2016	476	70.5		19.4; 1	16.0; 1	14.9; 0	11.0; 0	5.0; 0		31.1; 2	11.7
CIS	4–22 May 2016	391	?		? 1	? 1	? 0	? 0	? 0		? 2	?
SyM Consulting	5–20 May 2016	469	?		17.3; 1	15.7; 1	13.7; 0	12.6; 0	4.1; 0		34.5; 2	17.2
Gizaker/EITB	11–12 May 2016	400	?		18.0; 1	16.5; 1	14.0; 0	11.8; 0	4.4; 0		32.0; 2	14.0
Gizaker/EITB	13–14 Apr 2016	400	?	? 1/2	? 1	? 1	? 0/1	? 0	? 0	? 0	–	8.2
2015 general election	20 Dec 2015	—N/a	71.1	27.0; 1	18.8; 1	15.8; 1	14.1; 1	11.8; 0	5.9; 0	3.8; 0	–	8.2

=== Albacete ===
Polling firm/Commissioner	Fieldwork date	Sample size	Turnout	PP	PSOE	C's	Podemos	IU–UPeC	Unidos Podemos	Lead
2016 general election	26 Jun 2016	—N/a	71.5	40.9; 2	27.2; 1	14.6; 0			15.3; 1	13.6
GIPEyOP	6–20 Jun 2016	93	?	40.2; 2	25.5; 1	15.1; 0			18.4; 1	14.7
Sigma Dos/El Mundo	9–16 Jun 2016	?	?	39.0; 2	24.0; 1	17.0; 0/1			18.0; 0/1	15.0
DYM/El Confidencial	14–15 Jun 2016	?	?	? 2	? 1	? 0			? 1	?
NC Report/La Razón	6–15 Jun 2016	?	?	36.0; 2	27.4; 1	14.8; 0			18.9; 1	8.6
CIS	4–22 May 2016	258	?	? 2	? 1	? 0			? 1	?
Metroscopia/El País	19 May 2016	400	72	34.2; 2	27.6; 1	15.6; 0			19.9; 1	6.6
2015 general election	20 Dec 2015	—N/a	75.3	36.8; 2	28.2; 1	14.6; 1	14.0; 0	4.0; 0	–	8.6

=== Alicante ===
Polling firm/Commissioner	Fieldwork date	Sample size	Turnout	PP	ALV	PSOE	C's	IU–UPeC	Lead
2016 general election	26 Jun 2016	—N/a	70.4	37.7; 5	22.1; 3	21.4; 2	15.8; 2		15.6
GIPEyOP	6–20 Jun 2016	492	?	35.3; 5	26.9; 3	19.6; 2	17.3; 2		8.4
Sigma Dos/El Mundo	9–16 Jun 2016	?	?	32.0; 4	30.0; 4	19.0; 2	15.0; 2		2.0
DYM/El Confidencial	14–15 Jun 2016	?	?	? 5	? 3	? 2	? 2		?
NC Report/La Razón	6–10 Jun 2016	?	?	33.8; 5	25.7; 3	20.2; 2	16.1; 2		8.1
JM&A/ctxt	8 Jun 2016	?	?	33.1; 4	26.2; 3	21.6; 3	16.4; 2		6.9
Invest Group/Levante-EMV	31 May–7 Jun 2016	230	?	? 4/5	? 3/4	? 3	? 1		?
SyM Consulting/Valencia Plaza	2–5 Jun 2016	451	?	35.8; 4/5	24.3; 3	18.5; 2/3	17.2; 2		11.5
CIS	4–22 May 2016	470	?	? 4	? 3	? 3	? 2		?
Metroscopia/El País	11–14 Mar 2016	600	?	30.3; 4	19.6; 3	19.4; 3	18.9; 2	6.2; 0	10.7
2015 general election	20 Dec 2015	—N/a	72.9	32.8; 4	22.3; 3	20.8; 3	17.1; 2	3.7; 0	10.5

=== Almería ===
Polling firm/Commissioner	Fieldwork date	Sample size	Turnout	PP	PSOE	C's	Podemos	IULV	Unidos Podemos	Lead
2016 general election	26 Jun 2016	—N/a	62.9	43.0; 3	27.7; 2	13.7; 1			13.2; 0	15.3
GIPEyOP	6–20 Jun 2016	53	?	38.3; 2	27.2; 2	14.6; 1			17.5; 1	11.1
Sigma Dos/El Mundo	9–16 Jun 2016	?	?	40.0; 3	23.0; 1	17.0; 1			16.0; 1	17.0
DYM/El Confidencial	14–15 Jun 2016	?	?	? 2	? 2	? 1			? 1	Tie
NC Report/La Razón	31 May–9 Jun 2016	?	?	38.7; 2	29.4; 2	13.0; 1			16.0; 1	9.3
CIS	4–22 May 2016	320	?	? 3	? 1	? 1			? 1	?
Metroscopia/El País	20 May 2016	400	65	39.2; 2	27.3; 2	15.7; 1			15.2; 1	11.9
2015 general election	20 Dec 2015	—N/a	63.7	38.0; 2	28.9; 2	14.4; 1	12.8; 1	3.5; 0	–	9.1

=== Badajoz ===
Polling firm/Commissioner	Fieldwork date	Sample size	Turnout	PSOE	PP	Podemos	C's	IU–UPeC	Unidos Podemos	Lead
2016 general election	26 Jun 2016	—N/a	68.6	35.3; 2	39.6; 3		10.7; 0		12.5; 1	4.3
GIPEyOP	6–20 Jun 2016	34	?	30.7; 2	36.3; 2		12.2; 1		18.3; 1	5.6
Sigma Dos/El Mundo	9–16 Jun 2016	?	?	31.0; 2	37.0; 2/3		12.0; 0/1		17.0; 1	6.0
DYM/El Confidencial	14–15 Jun 2016	?	?	? 2	? 2		? 1		? 1	Tie
NC Report/La Razón	31 May–6 Jun 2016	?	?	36.6; 3	34.5; 2		? 0		14.5; 1	2.1
CIS	4–22 May 2016	260	?	? 2	? 2		? 1		? 1	Tie
Metroscopia/El País	19–20 May 2016	400	68	35.2; 2	34.8; 2		12.6; 1		14.8; 1	0.4
Metroscopia/El País	14 Mar 2016	400	?	31.8; 2	37.1; 3	8.9; 0	14.6; 1	6.0; 0	–	5.3
2015 general election	20 Dec 2015	—N/a	72.3	37.2; 3	34.5; 2	11.9; 1	11.4; 0	3.1; 0	–	2.7

=== Barcelona ===
Color key:

Exit poll

Polling firm/Commissioner	Fieldwork date	Sample size	Turnout	En Comú Podem	PSC	ERC–CatSí	C's	DiL CDC	PP	Lead
2016 general election	26 Jun 2016	—N/a	64.3	26.3; 9	16.8; 5	16.6; 5	11.5; 4	12.2; 4	13.5; 4	9.5
Sigma Dos/RTVE–FORTA	26 Jun 2016	?	?	30.2; 10/11	14.8; 5	19.3; 6/7	11.4; 4	7.9; 2	10.6; 3	10.9
GIPEyOP	6–20 Jun 2016	237	?	25.6; 8	18.4; 6	16.6; 5	13.1; 4	11.5; 4	12.1; 4	7.2
GAD3/La Vanguardia	13–16 Jun 2016	?	?	? 10/11	? 5	? 4/5	? 4	? 3	? 4	?
Sigma Dos/El Mundo	9–16 Jun 2016	?	?	30.0; 10/11	15.0; 5	14.0; 4/5	13.0; 4	10.0; 3	13.0; 4	15.0
DYM/El Confidencial	14–15 Jun 2016	?	?	? 9	? 5	? 5	? 5	? 4	? 3	?
NC Report/La Razón	30 May–3 Jun 2016	?	?	28.8; 9/10	15.7; 5	14.4; 4/5	14.9; 5	11.1; 3	11.6; 4	13.1
JM&A/ctxt	1 Jun 2016	?	?	29.4; 10	14.8; 5	13.9; 4	13.6; 4	14.2; 5	10.4; 3	14.6
Metroscopia/El País	24 May 2016	800	68	34.1; 12	15.8; 5	13.8; 4	12.3; 4	9.5; 3	9.9; 3	18.3
CIS	4–22 May 2016	858	?	? 11	? 5	? 4/5	? 4	? 3	? 3/4	?
Metroscopia/El País	17 Mar 2016	800	?	27.6; 10	16.5; 5	15.1; 5	15.7; 5	10.0; 3	10.1; 3	11.1
2015 general election	20 Dec 2015	—N/a	69.6	26.9; 9	16.3; 5	14.5; 5	13.5; 4	13.2; 4	11.3; 4	10.6

=== Biscay ===
Color key:

Exit poll

Polling firm/Commissioner	Fieldwork date	Sample size	Turnout	PNV	Podemos	PSE–EE	EH Bildu	PP	C's	IU–UPeC	Unidos Podemos	Lead
2016 general election	26 Jun 2016	—N/a	66.0	28.2; 2		13.9; 1	10.9; 1	12.7; 1	3.3; 0		28.9; 3	0.7
Sigma Dos/EITB	26 Jun 2016	?	?	29.7; 3		10.2; 1	14.7; 1	10.7; 1	2.9; 0		28.4; 2	1.3
GIPEyOP	6–20 Jun 2016	163	?	25.0; 2		17.9; 2	13.3; 1	12.5; 1	4.0; 0		26.2; 2	1.2
Sigma Dos/El Mundo	9–16 Jun 2016	?	?	28.0; 2/3		12.0; 1	12.0; 1	12.0; 1	4.0; 0		31.0; 2/3	3.0
DYM/El Confidencial	14–15 Jun 2016	?	?	? 2/3		? 1	? 1	? 1	? 0		? 2/3	Tie
Metroscopia/El País	9–10 Jun 2016	600	?	25.1; 2		11.8; 1	12.3; 1	11.7; 1	4.2; 0		31.9; 3	6.8
Gizaker/EITB	8–9 Jun 2016	400	?	28.6; 2/3		13.3; 1	12.7; 1	9.7; 0/1	3.7; 0		30.1; 3	1.5
NC Report/La Razón	30 May–3 Jun 2016	?	?	26.7; 2/3		12.9; 1	12.1; 1	11.2; 1	? 0		28.8; 2/3	2.1
Ikertalde/GPS	23 May–2 Jun 2016	1,050	69.0	27.0; 2		13.6; 1	12.4; 1	11.6; 1	3.3; 0		29.9; 3	2.9
CIS	4–22 May 2016	430	?	? 3		? 0	? 1	? 1	? 0		? 3	Tie
SyM Consulting	5–20 May 2016	406	?	26.3; 2		19.7; 2	11.8; 1	9.9; 1	5.3; 0		25.3; 2	1.0
Gizaker/EITB	11–12 May 2016	400	?	28.9; 2/3		12.8; 1	12.8; 1	10.3; 1	4.9; 0		28.4; 2/3	0.5
Gizaker/EITB	13–14 Apr 2016	400	?	? 3	? 2	? 1	? 1	? 1	? 0	? 0	–	?
2015 general election	20 Dec 2015	—N/a	69.4	27.9; 3	26.1; 2	13.0; 1	12.5; 1	11.4; 1	3.8; 0	2.8; 0	–	1.8

=== Burgos ===
Polling firm/Commissioner	Fieldwork date	Sample size	Turnout	PP	PSOE	Podemos	C's	IU–UPeC	Unidos Podemos	Lead
2016 general election	26 Jun 2016	—N/a	69.7	42.9; 2	22.1; 1		14.7; 0		17.3; 1	20.8
GIPEyOP	6–20 Jun 2016	70	?	38.9; 2	20.3; 1		16.6; 0		22.0; 1	16.9
NC Report/La Razón	18 Jun 2016	?	?	? 2	? 1		? 0		? 1	?
Sigma Dos/El Mundo	9–16 Jun 2016	?	?	37.0; 2	22.0; 1		18.0; 0		21.0; 1	15.0
DYM/El Confidencial	14–15 Jun 2016	?	?	? 2	? 1		? 0		? 1	?
CIS	4–22 May 2016	260	?	? 2	? 1		? 0		? 1	?
Metroscopia/El País	10–11 Mar 2016	400	?	35.9; 2	18.6; 1	12.4; 0	22.1; 1	9.0; 0	–	13.8
2015 general election	20 Dec 2015	—N/a	72.4	38.0; 2	20.7; 1	17.1; 1	15.6; 0	4.7; 0	–	17.3

=== Cádiz ===
Polling firm/Commissioner	Fieldwork date	Sample size	Turnout	PSOE	PP	Podemos	C's	IULV	Unidos Podemos	Lead
2016 general election	26 Jun 2016	—N/a	62.6	28.5; 3	32.3; 3		14.3; 1		21.2; 2	3.8
GIPEyOP	6–20 Jun 2016	70	?	28.2; 3	27.2; 3		16.6; 1		25.3; 2	1.0
Sigma Dos/El Mundo	9–16 Jun 2016	?	?	29.0; 3	30.0; 3		13.0; 1		25.0; 2	1.0
DYM/El Confidencial	14–15 Jun 2016	?	?	? 2/3	? 3		? 1		? 2/3	?
NC Report/La Razón	31 May–9 Jun 2016	?	?	27.2; 3	27.3; 3		16.1; 1		25.8; 2	0.1
Metroscopia/El País	20–30 May 2016	600	64	26.8; 2/3	28.5; 3		15.5; 1		27.1; 2/3	1.4
CIS	4–22 May 2016	370	?	? 3	? 3		? 1		? 2	Tie
Metroscopia/El País	7 Apr 2016	600	67	25.9; 2	27.9; 3		18.1; 2		22.4; 2	2.0
Metroscopia/El País	7 Apr 2016	600	67	25.9; 3	27.9; 3	16.6; 1	18.1; 2	8.4; 0	–	2.0
2015 general election	20 Dec 2015	—N/a	65.7	28.0; 3	27.7; 3	20.2; 2	14.7; 1	6.0; 0	–	0.3

=== Castellón ===
Polling firm/Commissioner	Fieldwork date	Sample size	Turnout	PP	ALV	PSOE	C's	IU–UPeC	Lead
2016 general election	26 Jun 2016	—N/a	72.6	35.7; 2	24.2; 1	22.1; 1	14.7; 1		11.5
GIPEyOP	6–20 Jun 2016	323	?	34.0; 2	28.5; 1	20.0; 1	15.9; 1		5.5
Sigma Dos/El Mundo	9–16 Jun 2016	?	?	35.0; 2	29.0; 1/2	19.0; 1	13.0; 0/1		6.0
DYM/El Confidencial	14–15 Jun 2016	?	?	? 2	? 1	? 1	? 1		?
NC Report/La Razón	6–10 Jun 2016	?	?	32.5; 2	26.8; 1	20.6; 1	14.6; 1		5.7
SyM Consulting/Valencia Plaza	2–5 Jun 2016	410	?	30.2; 1	30.8; 2	20.6; 1	15.3; 1		0.6
CIS	4–22 May 2016	320	?	? 1/2	? 1/2	? 1	? 1		Tie
2015 general election	20 Dec 2015	—N/a	75.0	31.8; 2	24.1; 1	21.5; 1	15.6; 1	3.1; 0	7.7

=== Ceuta ===
Polling firm/Commissioner	Fieldwork date	Sample size	Turnout	PP	PSOE	Podemos	C's	IU–UPeC	Unidos Podemos	Lead
2016 general election	26 Jun 2016	—N/a	50.7	51.9; 1	22.6; 0		11.5; 0		10.8; 0	29.3
GIPEyOP	6–20 Jun 2016	6	?	41.0; 1	22.1; 0		13.0; 0		21.0; 0	18.9
NC Report/La Razón	18 Jun 2016	?	?	46.3; 1	22.4; 0		12.6; 0		14.8; 0	23.9
DYM/El Confidencial	14–15 Jun 2016	?	?	? 1	? 0		? 0		? 0	?
CIS	4–22 May 2016	170	?	? 1	? 0		? 0		? 0	?
2015 general election	20 Dec 2015	—N/a	54.4	44.9; 1	23.1; 0	14.1; 0	13.3; 0	1.3; 0	–	21.8

=== Ciudad Real ===
Polling firm/Commissioner	Fieldwork date	Sample size	Turnout	PP	PSOE	Podemos	C's	IU–UPeC	Unidos Podemos	Lead
2016 general election	26 Jun 2016	—N/a	70.6	43.5; 3	29.3; 2		11.9; 0		13.4; 0	14.2
GIPEyOP	6–20 Jun 2016	33	?	40.9; 2	28.4; 2		12.1; 0		17.4; 1	12.5
Sigma Dos/El Mundo	9–16 Jun 2016	?	?	42.0; 3	26.0; 1		10.0; 0		20.0; 1	16.0
DYM/El Confidencial	14–15 Jun 2016	?	?	? 2	? 2		? 0		? 1	Tie
NC Report/La Razón	6–15 Jun 2016	?	?	39.8; 2	28.7; 2		? 0		16.1; 1	11.1
CIS	4–22 May 2016	219	?	? 3	? 2		? 0		? 0	?
Metroscopia/El País	16 May 2016	400	70	39.5; 2	26.8; 1/2		13.4; 0/1		16.7; 1	12.7
2015 general election	20 Dec 2015	—N/a	74.4	38.4; 3	31.1; 2	12.5; 0	12.3; 0	3.3; 0	–	7.3

=== Gipuzkoa ===
Color key:

Exit poll

Polling firm/Commissioner	Fieldwork date	Sample size	Turnout	Podemos	PNV	EH Bildu	PSE–EE	PP	C's	IU–UPeC	Unidos Podemos	Lead
2016 general election	26 Jun 2016	—N/a	63.3		23.3; 2	19.1; 1	14.1; 1	9.7; 0	3.2; 0		28.6; 2	5.3
Sigma Dos/EITB	26 Jun 2016	?	?		23.5; 1/2	25.3; 2	11.6; 0/1	3.8; 0	4.4; 0		27.3; 2	2.0
GIPEyOP	6–20 Jun 2016	52	?		22.2; 2	21.9; 1	17.4; 1	9.6; 0	3.2; 0		24.6; 2	2.4
Sigma Dos/El Mundo	9–16 Jun 2016	?	?		22.0; 1/2	19.0; 1	13.0; 1	9.0; 0	3.0; 0		32.0; 2/3	10.0
DYM/El Confidencial	14–15 Jun 2016	?	?		? 2	? 1	? 1	? 0	? 0		? 2	Tie
Metroscopia/El País	9–10 Jun 2016	600	?		23.0; 2	16.2; 1	13.7; 1	9.0; 0	3.3; 0		31.7; 2	8.7
Gizaker/EITB	8–9 Jun 2016	400	?		24.0; 2	21.7; 1	13.7; 1	8.2; 0	3.3; 0		28.2; 2	4.2
Gizaker/Gipuzkoa Deputation	31 May–3 Jun 2016	1,500	68.5		24.1; 2	20.8; 1	13.9; 1	7.5; 0	3.7; 0		29.3; 2	5.2
NC Report/La Razón	30 May–3 Jun 2016	?	?		22.3; 2	20.7; 1	13.4; 1	? 0	? 0		28.6; 2	6.3
Ikertalde/GPS	23 May–2 Jun 2016	784	70.0		22.9; 2	21.5; 1	13.2; 1	8.5; 0	3.2; 0		28.6; 2	5.7
CIS	4–22 May 2016	409	?		? 1	? 2	? 1	? 0	? 0		? 2	Tie
SyM Consulting	5–20 May 2016	399	?		24.6; 2	20.2; 1	11.2; 0/1	10.5; 0/1	3.5; 0		28.1; 2	3.5
Gizaker/EITB	11–12 May 2016	400	?		23.9; 2	21.6; 1	13.2; 1	7.5; 0	3.8; 0		28.0; 2	4.1
Gizaker/EITB	13–14 Apr 2016	400	?	? 2	? 2	? 1	? 1	? 0	? 0	? 0	–	Tie
2015 general election	20 Dec 2015	—N/a	67.4	25.3; 2	23.5; 2	20.9; 1	13.3; 1	8.7; 0	3.8; 0	2.8; 0	–	1.8

=== Girona ===
Color key:

Exit poll

Polling firm/Commissioner	Fieldwork date	Sample size	Turnout	DiL CDC	ERC–CatSí	En Comú Podem	PSC	C's	PP	Lead
2016 general election	26 Jun 2016	—N/a	60.6	23.2; 2	26.3; 2	17.3; 1	12.5; 1	7.7; 0	10.1; 0	3.1
Sigma Dos/RTVE–FORTA	26 Jun 2016	?	?	18.5; 1	27.4; 2	21.3; 1/2	13.0; 1	6.3; 0	9.6; 0/1	6.1
GIPEyOP	6–20 Jun 2016	19	?	21.0; 1	23.7; 2	15.8; 1	14.8; 1	10.4; 0	12.6; 1	2.7
GAD3/La Vanguardia	13–16 Jun 2016	?	?	? 1/2	? 2	? 1	? 1	? 0/1	? 0	?
Sigma Dos/El Mundo	9–16 Jun 2016	?	?	20.0; 1	24.0; 2	18.0; 1	13.0; 1	12.0; 1	9.0; 0	4.0
DYM/El Confidencial	14–15 Jun 2016	?	?	? 2	? 2	? 1	? 1	? 0	? 0	Tie
NC Report/La Razón	30 May–3 Jun 2016	?	?	21.6; 1/2	23.9; 2	17.9; 1	12.9; 1	11.3; 0/1	? 0	2.3
CIS	4–22 May 2016	408	?	? 2	? 2	? 1	? 1	? 0	? 0	Tie
2015 general election	20 Dec 2015	—N/a	65.6	25.0; 2	23.5; 2	16.3; 1	12.7; 1	9.8; 0	8.5; 0	1.5

=== Granada ===
Polling firm/Commissioner	Fieldwork date	Sample size	Turnout	PP	PSOE	Podemos	C's	IULV	Unidos Podemos	Lead
2016 general election	26 Jun 2016	—N/a	66.0	35.3; 3	30.9; 2		13.5; 1		17.8; 1	4.4
GIPEyOP	6–20 Jun 2016	200	?	33.8; 3	28.9; 2		14.5; 1		21.3; 1	4.9
Sigma Dos/El Mundo	9–16 Jun 2016	?	?	35.0; 2/3	24.0; 2		13.0; 1		23.0; 1/2	11.0
DYM/El Confidencial	14–15 Jun 2016	?	?	? 2	? 2		? 1		? 2	Tie
NC Report/La Razón	31 May–9 Jun 2016	?	?	32.3; 3	29.7; 2		14.4; 1		20.7; 1	2.6
Metroscopia/El País	20–23 May 2016	600	68	31.9; 2/3	27.8; 2		15.9; 1		21.2; 1/2	4.1
CIS	4–22 May 2016	370	?	? 2	? 2		? 1		? 2	Tie
2015 general election	20 Dec 2015	—N/a	68.8	31.1; 3	31.0; 2	16.4; 1	13.9; 1	5.1; 0	–	0.1

=== Guadalajara ===
Polling firm/Commissioner	Fieldwork date	Sample size	Turnout	PP	PSOE	C's	Podemos	IU–UPeC	Unidos Podemos	Lead
2016 general election	26 Jun 2016	—N/a	72.9	39.6; 2	23.0; 1	16.4; 0			18.2; 0	16.6
GIPEyOP	6–20 Jun 2016	11	?	37.2; 1	20.4; 1	17.8; 0			22.7; 1	14.5
Sigma Dos/El Mundo	9–16 Jun 2016	?	?	35.0; 1	23.0; 1	17.0; 0			22.0; 1	12.0
DYM/El Confidencial	14–15 Jun 2016	?	?	? 1	? 1	? 0			? 1	Tie
NC Report/La Razón	6–15 Jun 2016	?	?	36.2; 1	20.8; 1	17.7; 0			22.3; 1	13.9
SyM Consulting/Guadalajara Diario	1–2 Jun 2016	505	74.9	38.7; 1	21.8; 1	13.6; 0			23.1; 1	15.6
CIS	4–22 May 2016	243	?	? 1	? 1	? 0			? 1	Tie
Metroscopia/El País	19 May 2016	400	72	37.1; 1	20.2; 1	17.1; 0			22.7; 1	14.4
2015 general election	20 Dec 2015	—N/a	75.6	34.8; 1	22.5; 1	18.1; 1	17.5; 0	4.1; 0	–	12.3

=== Huesca ===
Polling firm/Commissioner	Fieldwork date	Sample size	Turnout	PP	PSOE	Podemos	C's	IU–UPeC	PAR	CHA	Unidos Podemos	Lead
2016 general election	26 Jun 2016	—N/a	68.0	36.2; 1	25.6; 1		15.3; 0			–	19.2; 1	10.6
GIPEyOP	6–20 Jun 2016	21	?	35.2; 1	22.7; 1		16.1; 0			–	23.8; 1	11.4
Sigma Dos/El Mundo	9–16 Jun 2016	?	?	36.0; 1	22.0; 1		16.0; 0			–	23.0; 1	13.0
DYM/El Confidencial	14–15 Jun 2016	?	?	? 1	? 1		? 0			–	? 1	Tie
A+M/Heraldo de Aragón	13–15 Jun 2016	?	64.4	34.3; 1	25.7; 1		14.4; 0			–	24.0; 1	8.6
NC Report/La Razón	6–15 Jun 2016	?	?	35.3; 1	24.6; 1		? 0			–	22.2; 1	10.7
CIS	4–22 May 2016	245	?	? 1	? 1		? 0			–	? 1	Tie
2015 general election	20 Dec 2015	—N/a	70.8	32.5; 1	24.7; 1	18.0; 1	16.2; 0	5.3; 0			–	7.8

=== Las Palmas ===
Polling firm/Commissioner	Fieldwork date	Sample size	Turnout	PP	Podemos	PSOE	C's	CC	IU–UPeC	NCa	Unidos Podemos	Lead
2016 general election	26 Jun 2016	—N/a	60.4	33.9; 3		23.8; 2	13.0; 1	3.6; 0			22.5; 2	10.1
GIPEyOP	6–20 Jun 2016	45	?	28.9; 2		21.9; 2	16.7; 1	? 0			29.4; 3	0.5
Hamalgama Métrica/La Provincia	8–17 Jun 2016	1,000	?	30.9; 2/3		21.1; 1/2	13.1; 1	3.7; 0			28.5; 2/3	2.4
Sigma Dos/El Mundo	9–16 Jun 2016	?	?	27.0; 2/3		23.0; 2	18.0; 1/2	3.0; 0			26.0; 2	1.0
JM&A/ctxt	15 Jun 2016	?	?	28.0; 2		20.9; 2	13.2; 1	4.3; 0			30.7; 3	2.7
DYM/El Confidencial	14–15 Jun 2016	?	?	? 2		? 2	? 1	? 0			? 3	?
Metroscopia/El País	2–3 Jun 2016	600	?	29.4; 2/3		23.1; 2	13.1; 1	? 0			28.9; 2/3	0.5
CIS	4–22 May 2016	367	?	? 2		? 2	? 1	? 0			? 3	?
2015 general election	20 Dec 2015	—N/a	62.4	28.2; 3	26.5; 2	22.4; 2	12.3; 1	4.2; 0	3.0; 0		–	1.7

=== León ===
Polling firm/Commissioner	Fieldwork date	Sample size	Turnout	PP	PSOE	Podemos	C's	IU–UPeC	Unidos Podemos	UPL	Lead
2016 general election	26 Jun 2016	—N/a	64.5	40.1; 2	26.2; 1		12.8; 0		17.6; 1	0.7; 0	13.9
GIPEyOP	6–20 Jun 2016	40	?	37.7; 2	23.5; 1		14.1; 0		23.1; 1	–	14.2
NC Report/La Razón	18 Jun 2016	?	?	? 2	? 1		? 0		? 1	–	?
Sigma Dos/El Mundo	9–16 Jun 2016	?	?	37.0; 2	20.0; 1		15.0; 0		22.0; 1	–	15.0
DYM/El Confidencial	14–15 Jun 2016	?	?	? 2	? 1		? 0		? 1	–	?
SyM Consulting/La Nueva Crónica	1–3 Jun 2016	430	?	41.0; 2	23.7; 1		7.5; 0		24.8; 1	–	16.2
Celeste-Tel/Diario de León	23 May–2 Jun 2016	600	64.2	35.2; 2	24.0; 1		14.3; 0		21.5; 1	3.3; 0	11.2
CIS	4–22 May 2016	320	?	? 2	? 1		? 0		? 1	–	?
Metroscopia/El País	8 Apr 2016	600	72	31.5; 2	21.3; 1	14.1; 1	20.9; 1	8.3; 0	–	–	10.2
2015 general election	20 Dec 2015	—N/a	66.9	35.6; 2	25.4; 1	17.6; 1	13.0; 1	4.8; 0	–	–	10.2

=== Lleida ===
Color key:

Exit poll

Polling firm/Commissioner	Fieldwork date	Sample size	Turnout	DiL CDC	ERC–CatSí	En Comú Podem	PSC	PP	C's	Lead
2016 general election	26 Jun 2016	—N/a	58.4	22.6; 1	25.1; 1	16.7; 1	12.4; 0	13.5; 1	7.0; 0	2.5
Sigma Dos/RTVE–FORTA	26 Jun 2016	?	?	16.7; 1	30.5; 2	22.0; 1	10.1; 0	7.8; 0	7.6; 0	8.5
GIPEyOP	6–20 Jun 2016	18	?	27.7; 2	19.4; 1	16.2; 1	12.6; 0	13.7; 0	9.4; 0	8.3
GAD3/La Vanguardia	13–16 Jun 2016	?	?	? 1	? 1	? 1	? 0/1	? 0/1	? 0	Tie
Sigma Dos/El Mundo	9–16 Jun 2016	?	?	19.0; 1	23.0; 1	17.0; 1	11.0; 0	14.0; 1	12.0; 0	4.0
DYM/El Confidencial	14–15 Jun 2016	?	?	? 1	? 1/2	? 1	? 0/1	? 0	? 0	8.5
NC Report/La Razón	30 May–3 Jun 2016	?	?	21.0; 1	22.7; 1	17.1; 1	12.7; 1	? 0	? 0	1.7
CIS	4–22 May 2016	355	?	? 1	? 1	? 1	? 1	? 0	? 0	Tie
2015 general election	20 Dec 2015	—N/a	63.9	24.3; 1	22.3; 1	15.3; 1	12.4; 1	11.3; 0	9.0; 0	2.0

=== Lugo ===
Polling firm/Commissioner	Fieldwork date	Sample size	Turnout	PP	PSdeG–PSOE	En Marea	C's	BNG	Lead
2016 general election	26 Jun 2016	—N/a	56.3	47.4; 2	23.7; 1	17.0; 1	6.9; 0	2.6; 0	23.7
GIPEyOP	6–20 Jun 2016	15	?	43.3; 2	20.8; 1	22.1; 1	7.1; 0	5.5; 0	21.2
Sigma Dos/El Mundo	9–16 Jun 2016	?	?	38.0; 2	26.0; 1	22.0; 1	8.0; 0	? 0	12.0
DYM/El Confidencial	14–15 Jun 2016	?	?	? 2	? 1	? 1	? 0	? 0	?
Sondaxe/La Voz de Galicia	6–14 Jun 2016	300	?	45.1; 2	22.6; 1	21.5; 1	4.2; 0	3.4; 0	22.5
CIS	4–22 May 2016	260	?	? 2	? 1	? 1	? 0	? 0	?
Metroscopia/El País	21 Apr 2016	400	70	42.8; 2	19.5; 1	22.6; 1	9.7; 0	2.5; 0	20.2
GAD3/ABC	4–6 Apr 2016	?	?	? 2	? 1	? 1	? 0	? 0	?
Sondaxe/La Voz de Galicia	5–9 Mar 2016	?	?	42.9; 2	24.8; 1	17.2; 1	? 0	? 0	18.1
2015 general election	20 Dec 2015	—N/a	59.2	42.5; 2	24.0; 1	19.2; 1	7.6; 0	3.6; 0	18.5

=== Málaga ===
Polling firm/Commissioner	Fieldwork date	Sample size	Turnout	PP	PSOE	Podemos	C's	IULV	Unidos Podemos	Lead
2016 general election	26 Jun 2016	—N/a	64.6	34.4; 4	27.0; 3		16.3; 2		18.9; 2	7.4
GIPEyOP	6–20 Jun 2016	103	?	29.0; 3	27.0; 3		18.1; 2		23.5; 3	2.0
Sigma Dos/El Mundo	9–16 Jun 2016	?	?	33.0; 4	23.0; 2/3		17.0; 2		24.0; 2/3	9.0
JM&A/ctxt	15 Jun 2016	?	?	30.4; 4	26.5; 3		19.4; 2		21.0; 2	3.9
DYM/El Confidencial	14–15 Jun 2016	?	?	? 3	? 3		? 2		? 3	Tie
NC Report/La Razón	31 May–9 Jun 2016	?	?	31.3; 4	26.2; 3		16.8; 2		22.1; 2	5.1
Metroscopia/El País	25–26 May 2016	600	69	29.5; 3	24.9; 3		17.4; 2		23.6; 3	4.6
CIS	4–22 May 2016	499	?	? 4	? 4		? 1		? 2	Tie
Metroscopia/El País	4 Apr 2016	600	?	27.9; 4	25.0; 3	12.9; 1	19.5; 2	9.7; 1	–	2.9
2015 general election	20 Dec 2015	—N/a	67.5	28.9; 4	26.9; 3	17.1; 2	17.1; 2	6.8; 0	–	2.0

=== Melilla ===
Polling firm/Commissioner	Fieldwork date	Sample size	Turnout	PP	PSOE	C's	Podemos	IU–UPeC		Unidos Podemos	Lead
2016 general election	26 Jun 2016	—N/a	47.6	49.9; 1	25.1; 0	12.4; 0			–	9.8; 0	24.8
GIPEyOP	6–20 Jun 2016	5	?	38.6; 1	24.1; 0	13.7; 0			–	19.8; 0	14.5
NC Report/La Razón	18 Jun 2016	?	?	42.9; 1	22.9; 0	19.3; 0			–	12.9; 0	20.0
DYM/El Confidencial	14–15 Jun 2016	?	?	? 1	? 0	? 0			–	? 0	?
CIS	4–22 May 2016	170	?	? 1	? 0	? 0			–	? 0	?
SyM Consulting	4–5 May 2016	412	46.2	35.9; 1	18.9; 0	15.0; 0	13.2; 0	–	11.3; 0	–	17.0
2015 general election	20 Dec 2015	—N/a	49.4	43.9; 1	24.6; 0	15.5; 0	11.4; 0	1.3; 0	–	–	19.3

=== Ourense ===
Polling firm/Commissioner	Fieldwork date	Sample size	Turnout	PP	PSdeG–PSOE	En Marea	C's	BNG	Lead
2016 general election	26 Jun 2016	—N/a	51.7	49.7; 3	23.3; 1	15.6; 0	7.1; 0	2.2; 0	21.7
GIPEyOP	6–20 Jun 2016	6	?	43.8; 2	19.7; 1	21.0; 1	5.9; 0	7.4; 0	22.8
Sigma Dos/El Mundo	9–16 Jun 2016	?	?	43.0; 2	26.0; 1	15.0; 1	11.0; 0	? 0	17.0
DYM/El Confidencial	14–15 Jun 2016	?	?	? 2	? 1	? 1	? 0	? 0	?
Sondaxe/La Voz de Galicia	6–14 Jun 2016	300	?	48.3; 2	21.4; 1	20.5; 1	5.1; 0	2.7; 0	26.9
CIS	4–22 May 2016	256	?	? 2	? 1	? 1	? 0	? 0	?
Metroscopia/El País	21–22 Apr 2016	400	70	45.9; 2	18.6; 1	17.8; 1	12.0; 0	2.9; 0	27.3
GAD3/ABC	4–6 Apr 2016	?	?	? 2	? 1	? 1	? 0	? 0	?
Sondaxe/La Voz de Galicia	5–9 Mar 2016	?	?	42.2; 2	27.9; 1	14.7; 1	? 1	? 0	14.3
2015 general election	20 Dec 2015	—N/a	53.5	44.9; 2	23.2; 1	17.8; 1	7.9; 0	3.3; 0	21.7

=== Pontevedra ===
Polling firm/Commissioner	Fieldwork date	Sample size	Turnout	PP	En Marea	PSdeG–PSOE	C's	BNG	Lead
2016 general election	26 Jun 2016	—N/a	61.2	38.4; 3	25.2; 2	21.8; 2	8.9; 0	3.1; 0	13.2
GIPEyOP	6–20 Jun 2016	39	?	35.5; 3	29.3; 2	21.1; 2	9.3; 0	? 0	6.2
Sigma Dos/El Mundo	9–16 Jun 2016	?	?	37.0; 3/4	26.0; 2	18.0; 1	10.0; 0/1	? 0	11.0
JM&A/ctxt	15 Jun 2016	?	?	33.3; 3	31.5; 3	18.8; 1	9.4; 0	? 0	1.8
DYM/El Confidencial	14–15 Jun 2016	?	?	? 3	? 2	? 2	? 0	? 0	?
Sondaxe/La Voz de Galicia	6–14 Jun 2016	400	?	34.5; 3	31.7; 3	18.1; 1	10.5; 0	? 0	2.8
CIS	4–22 May 2016	340	?	? 3	? 3	? 1	? 0	? 0	Tie
Metroscopia/El País	20 Apr 2016	600	71	33.9; 3	30.1; 2	18.0; 1	12.3; 1	2.4; 0	3.8
GAD3/ABC	4–6 Apr 2016	?	?	? 3	? 1	? 2	? 1	? 0	?
Metroscopia/El País	10 Mar 2016	600	?	32.0; 3	27.6; 2	20.2; 1	14.4; 1	? 0	4.4
Sondaxe/La Voz de Galicia	5–9 Mar 2016	?	?	39.7; 3	28.3; 2	20.4; 2	? 0	3.9; 0	11.4
2015 general election	20 Dec 2015	—N/a	64.3	34.5; 3	27.9; 2	20.8; 2	9.0; 0	4.6; 0	6.6

=== Santa Cruz de Tenerife ===
Polling firm/Commissioner	Fieldwork date	Sample size	Turnout	PP	PSOE	Podemos	CC	C's	IU–UPeC	NCa	Unidos Podemos	Lead
2016 general election	26 Jun 2016	—N/a	57.8	34.2; 3	21.2; 1		12.6; 1	11.0; 1			17.9; 1	13.0
GIPEyOP	6–20 Jun 2016	35	?	32.4; 2	22.1; 2		? 0	15.3; 0			25.7; 2	6.7
Hamalgama Métrica/La Provincia	8–17 Jun 2016	1,000	?	30.9; 2	21.5; 1/2		11.8; 1	9.5; 0/1			23.2; 2	7.7
Sigma Dos/El Mundo	9–16 Jun 2016	?	?	32.0; 2/3	22.0; 2		11.0; 0/1	10.0; 0/1			23.0; 2	9.0
DYM/El Confidencial	14–15 Jun 2016	?	?	? 2	? 1		? 1	? 1			? 2	Tie
Metroscopia/El País	2–3 Jun 2016	600	?	30.9; 2/3	20.1; 1/2		9.1; 0/1	13.2; 1			23.0; 2/3	7.9
CIS	4–22 May 2016	427	?	? 3	? 1		? 1	? 0			? 2	?
2015 general election	20 Dec 2015	—N/a	58.2	28.9; 2	21.5; 2	19.9; 1	12.6; 1	10.5; 1	3.3; 0		–	7.4

=== Seville ===
Polling firm/Commissioner	Fieldwork date	Sample size	Turnout	PSOE	PP	Podemos	C's	IULV	Unidos Podemos	Lead
2016 general election	26 Jun 2016	—N/a	68.2	33.6; 4	29.0; 4		13.4; 1		20.8; 3	4.6
GIPEyOP	6–20 Jun 2016	155	?	32.7; 4	27.8; 4		12.9; 1		24.7; 3	4.9
Sigma Dos/El Mundo	9–16 Jun 2016	?	?	30.0; 4	30.0; 3/4		12.0; 1/2		25.0; 3	Tie
DYM/El Confidencial	14–15 Jun 2016	?	?	? 4	? 3		? 2		? 3	?
NC Report/La Razón	31 May–9 Jun 2016	?	?	33.3; 5	25.9; 3		13.2; 1		24.0; 3	7.4
JM&A/ctxt	1 Jun 2016	?	?	32.1; 4	26.3; 3		13.9; 2		23.4; 3	5.8
Metroscopia/El País	25–26 May 2016	600	73	33.7; 4/5	26.4; 3		13.4; 1/2		22.4; 3	7.3
CIS	4–22 May 2016	500	?	? 4	? 3		? 2		? 3	?
Metroscopia/El País	7–8 Mar 2016	600	?	27.9; 4	26.4; 3	17.1; 2	18.8; 2	7.5; 1	–	1.5
2015 general election	20 Dec 2015	—N/a	72.2	33.9; 5	25.2; 3	19.0; 2	13.0; 2	5.7; 0	–	8.7

=== Tarragona ===
Color key:

Exit poll

Polling firm/Commissioner	Fieldwork date	Sample size	Turnout	En Comú Podem	ERC–CatSí	PSC	DiL CDC	C's	PP	Lead
2016 general election	26 Jun 2016	—N/a	61.8	21.9; 1	19.7; 1	15.7; 1	13.7; 1	11.3; 1	14.9; 1	2.2
Sigma Dos/RTVE–FORTA	26 Jun 2016	?	?	25.4; 2	21.4; 1	15.1; 1	11.8; 1	9.7; 0	11.7; 1	4.0
GIPEyOP	6–20 Jun 2016	19	?	20.6; 1	19.2; 1	17.1; 1	11.6; 1	14.5; 1	15.4; 1	1.4
GAD3/La Vanguardia	13–16 Jun 2016	?	?	? 1	? 1	? 1	? 1	? 1	? 1	Tie
Sigma Dos/El Mundo	9–16 Jun 2016	?	?	23.0; 1/2	17.0; 1	16.0; 1	11.0; 0/1	16.0; 1	13.0; 1	6.0
DYM/El Confidencial	14–15 Jun 2016	?	?	? 1	? 1	? 1	? 1	? 1	? 1	Tie
NC Report/La Razón	30 May–3 Jun 2016	?	?	22.1; 1	17.5; 1	15.5; 1	12.6; 1	15.8; 1	12.6; 1	4.6
CIS	4–22 May 2016	436	?	? 1/2	? 1	? 1	? 0/1	? 1	? 1	?
2015 general election	20 Dec 2015	—N/a	66.9	20.6; 1	17.5; 1	15.8; 1	15.3; 1	14.2; 1	12.2; 1	3.1

=== Teruel ===
Polling firm/Commissioner	Fieldwork date	Sample size	Turnout	PP	PSOE	Podemos	C's	IU–UPeC	PAR	CHA	Unidos Podemos	Lead
2016 general election	26 Jun 2016	—N/a	69.4	41.3; 2	26.3; 1		13.2; 0			–	16.8; 0	15.0
GIPEyOP	6–20 Jun 2016	52	?	40.9; 1	23.2; 1		13.9; 0			–	21.4; 1	17.7
Sigma Dos/El Mundo	9–16 Jun 2016	?	?	35.0; 1	24.0; 1		16.0; 0			–	21.0; 1	11.0
DYM/El Confidencial	14–15 Jun 2016	?	?	? 1/2	? 1		? 0			–	? 0/1	?
A+M/Heraldo de Aragón	13–15 Jun 2016	?	64.9	37.7; 1/2	24.7; 1		16.8; 0/1			–	19.0; 0/1	13.0
NC Report/La Razón	6–15 Jun 2016	?	?	39.1; 1/2	25.3; 1		? 0			–	19.4; 0/1	13.8
Metroscopia/El País	13 Jun 2016	400	72	34.9; 2	21.6; 1		17.2; 0			–	20.7; 1	13.3
CIS	4–22 May 2016	205	?	? 1/2	? 1		? 0			–	? 0/1	?
Metroscopia/El País	11 Mar 2016	400	?	33.3; 1	24.0; 1	11.5; 0	19.0; 1	9.3; 0			–	9.3
2015 general election	20 Dec 2015	—N/a	71.6	36.4; 2	25.7; 1	15.3; 0	14.7; 0	5.0; 0			–	10.7

=== Toledo ===
Polling firm/Commissioner	Fieldwork date	Sample size	Turnout	PP	PSOE	C's	Podemos	IU–UPeC	Unidos Podemos	Lead
2016 general election	26 Jun 2016	—N/a	71.8	43.4; 3	26.6; 2	13.0; 0			14.7; 1	16.8
GIPEyOP	6–20 Jun 2016	127	?	42.0; 3	24.1; 1	12.4; 1			19.7; 1	17.9
Sigma Dos/El Mundo	9–16 Jun 2016	?	?	40.0; 3	22.0; 1	18.0; 1			18.0; 1	18.0
DYM/El Confidencial	14–15 Jun 2016	?	?	? 2	? 2	? 1			? 1	Tie
NC Report/La Razón	6–15 Jun 2016	?	?	40.5; 2/3	27.2; 1/2	13.2; 0/1			16.5; 1	13.3
CIS	4–22 May 2016	318	?	? 3	? 1	? 1			? 1	?
Metroscopia/El País	4 Apr 2016	600	73–74	37.4; 2	25.7; 2	15.7; 1	12.8; 1	5.3; 0	–	11.7
2015 general election	20 Dec 2015	—N/a	75.2	38.8; 2	27.8; 2	13.8; 1	13.6; 1	3.5; 0	–	11.0

=== Valencia ===
Polling firm/Commissioner	Fieldwork date	Sample size	Turnout	PP	ALV	PSOE	C's	IU–UPeC	Lead
2016 general election	26 Jun 2016	—N/a	73.6	34.0; 6	27.8; 5	20.1; 3	14.5; 2		6.2
GIPEyOP	6–20 Jun 2016	4,886	?	32.8; 6	31.8; 5	18.5; 3	15.6; 2		1.0
Sigma Dos/El Mundo	9–16 Jun 2016	?	?	32.0; 5/6	32.0; 5/6	17.0; 3	15.0; 2		Tie
DYM/El Confidencial	14–15 Jun 2016	?	?	? 5	? 5	? 3	? 3		Tie
NC Report/La Razón	6–10 Jun 2016	?	?	31.3; 6	30.4; 5	18.0; 3	14.6; 2		0.9
JM&A/ctxt	8 Jun 2016	?	?	30.6; 5	31.9; 6	19.6; 3	14.6; 2		1.3
Invest Group/Levante-EMV	31 May–7 Jun 2016	320	?	? 4	? 6	? 4	? 2		?
SyM Consulting/Valencia Plaza	2–5 Jun 2016	510	?	32.8; 5/6	29.7; 5	19.9; 3/4	13.9; 2		3.1
Metroscopia/El País	24–25 May 2016	600	73	27.1; 4	33.5; 6	18.4; 3	16.4; 3		6.4
CIS	4–22 May 2016	516	?	? 6	? 5	? 3	? 2		?
Metroscopia/El País	9–10 Mar 2016	600	?	24.8; 4	23.5; 4	18.9; 3	20.4; 3	7.2; 1	1.3
2015 general election	20 Dec 2015	—N/a	75.9	30.2; 5	27.1; 5	18.8; 3	15.1; 2	4.7; 0	3.1

=== Valladolid ===
Polling firm/Commissioner	Fieldwork date	Sample size	Turnout	PP	PSOE	C's	Podemos	IU–UPeC	Unidos Podemos	Lead
2016 general election	26 Jun 2016	—N/a	73.7	41.8; 2	22.7; 1	15.6; 1			16.4; 1	19.1
GIPEyOP	6–20 Jun 2016	760	?	38.2; 2	20.3; 1	19.3; 1			21.3; 1	16.9
NC Report/La Razón	18 Jun 2016	?	?	? 2	? 1	? 1			? 1	?
Sigma Dos/El Mundo	9–16 Jun 2016	?	?	44.0; 2	17.0; 1	18.0; 1			20.0; 1	24.0
DYM/El Confidencial	14–15 Jun 2016	?	?	? 2	? 1	? 1			? 1	?
CIS	4–22 May 2016	320	?	? 2	? 1	? 1			? 1	?
Metroscopia/El País	14 Mar 2016	400	?	38.0; 3	18.6; 1	21.4; 1	10.2; 0	8.8; 0	–	16.6
2015 general election	20 Dec 2015	—N/a	76.5	36.9; 2	21.6; 1	17.1; 1	15.3; 1	5.5; 0	–	15.3

=== Zaragoza ===
Polling firm/Commissioner	Fieldwork date	Sample size	Turnout	PP	PSOE	Podemos	C's	IU–UPeC	PAR	CHA	Unidos Podemos	Lead
2016 general election	26 Jun 2016	—N/a	70.4	34.9; 3	24.4; 2		16.8; 1			–	20.3; 1	10.5
GIPEyOP	6–20 Jun 2016	115	?	29.7; 2	21.7; 2		19.0; 1			–	26.5; 2	3.2
Sigma Dos/El Mundo	9–16 Jun 2016	?	?	34.0; 2/3	20.0; 1/2		18.0; 1			–	24.0; 2	10.0
DYM/El Confidencial	14–15 Jun 2016	?	?	? 2	? 2		? 1			–	? 2	Tie
A+M/Heraldo de Aragón	13–15 Jun 2016	?	64.8	31.0; 2/3	25.4; 2		20.3; 1/2			–	20.3; 1/2	5.6
NC Report/La Razón	6–15 Jun 2016	?	?	32.3; 2/3	22.1; 1/2		15.9; 1			–	25.5; 2	6.8
JM&A/ctxt	8 Jun 2016	?	?	31.6; 2	21.8; 2		20.1; 1			–	23.4; 2	8.2
Metroscopia/El País	27 May 2016	600	72	30.5; 2	22.0; 2		17.7; 1			–	23.2; 2	7.3
CIS	4–22 May 2016	390	?	? 2	? 2		? 1			–	? 2	Tie
Metroscopia/El País	11–13 Apr 2016	600	?	28.7; 2	23.4; 2	13.7; 1	21.6; 2	8.9; 0			–	5.3
2015 general election	20 Dec 2015	—N/a	73.1	30.3; 3	22.3; 2	19.2; 1	17.8; 1	6.5; 0			–	8.0

== See also ==
- Opinion polling for the 2016 Spanish general election
