= Valladolid (Congress of Deputies constituency) =

Electoral constituency in Spain

Coordinates: 41°35′N 4°40′W

- Congress of Deputies; Electoral constituency
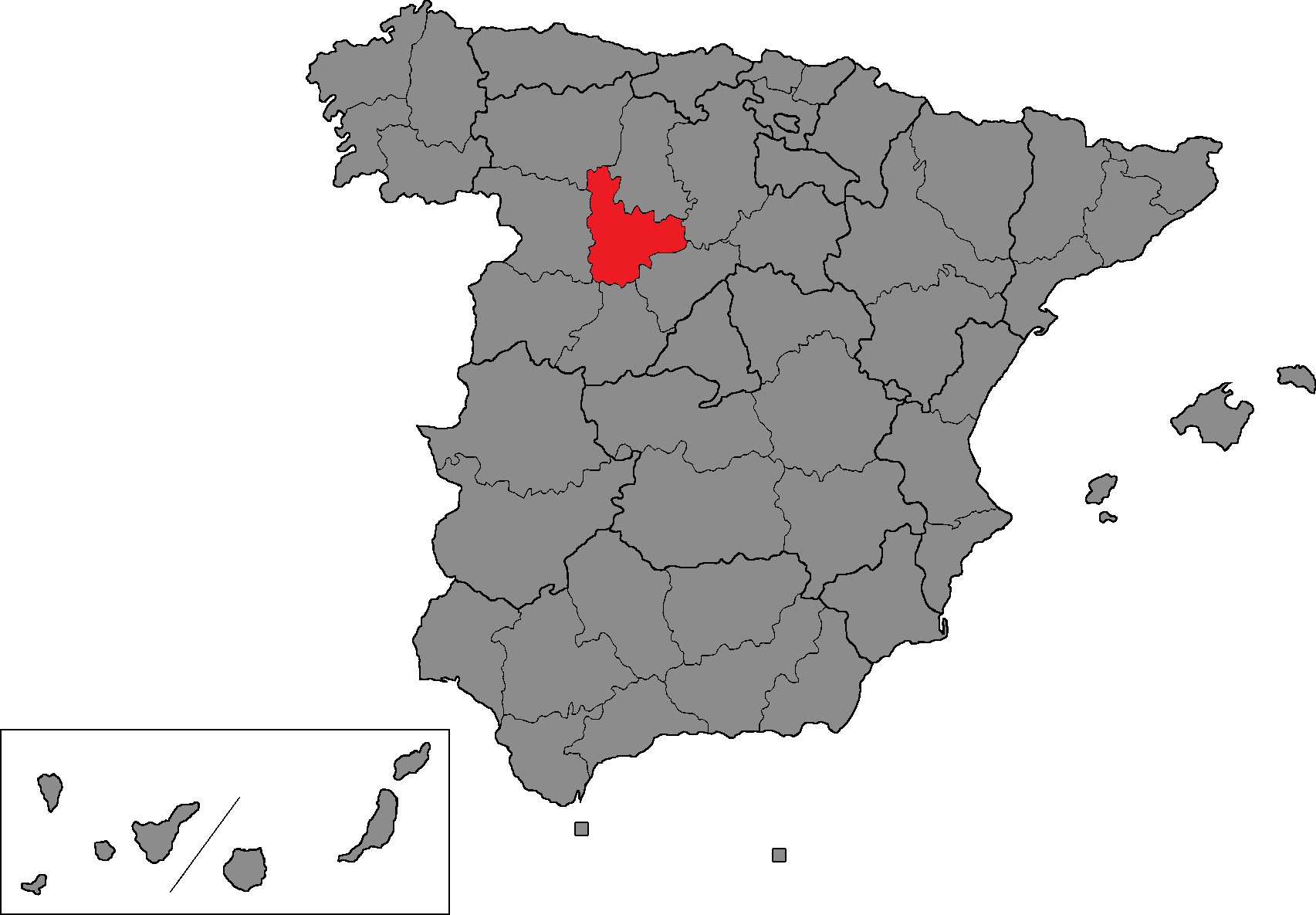
- Location of Valladolid within Spain
- Province: Valladolid
- Autonomous community: Castile and León
- Population: ▲525,398 (2024)
- Electorate: ▼431,381 (2023)
- Major settlements: Valladolid, Medina del Campo, Laguna de Duero

Current constituency
- Created: 1977
- Seats: 5
- Members: PP (2); PSOE (2); Vox (1)

Valladolid is one of the 52 constituencies represented in the Congress of Deputies, the lower chamber of the Spanish parliament, the Cortes Generales. The constituency (whose boundaries correspond to those of the homonymous province) currently elects four deputies. The electoral system uses the D'Hondt method and closed-list proportional voting, with a minimum threshold of three percent.

== Electoral system ==
The constituency was created as per the Political Reform Law and was first contested in the 1977 general election. The Law provided for the provinces of Spain to be established as multi-member districts in the Congress of Deputies, with this regulation being maintained under the Spanish Constitution of 1978. Additionally, the Constitution requires for any modification of the provincial limits to be approved under an organic law, needing an absolute majority in the Cortes Generales.

Voting is based on universal suffrage, comprising all Spanish nationals over 18 years of age with full political rights, provided that they have not been deprived of the right to vote by a final sentence. The only exception was in 1977, when this was limited to nationals over 21 years of age and in full enjoyment of their political and civil rights. Amendments in 2011 required non-resident citizens to apply for voting, a system known as "begged" voting (Spanish: Voto rogado). which was abolished in 2022. Further, amendments in 2018 granted the right to vote to those legally incapacitated. The Congress of Deputies has a minimum of 300 and a maximum of 400 seats, with electoral provisions fixing its size at 350. Of these, 348 are elected in 50 multi-member constituencies corresponding to the provinces of Spain—each of which is assigned an initial minimum of two seats and the remaining 248 distributed in proportion to population—using the D'Hondt method and closed-list proportional voting, with a three percent-threshold of valid votes (including blank ballots) in each constituency. The remaining two seats are allocated to Ceuta and Melilla as single-member districts elected by plurality voting. The use of this electoral method may result in a higher effective threshold depending on district magnitude and vote distribution. The law does not provide for by-elections to fill vacant seats; instead, any vacancies arising after the proclamation of candidates and during the legislative term are filled by the next candidates on the party lists or, when required, by designated substitutes.

The electoral law allows for parties and federations registered in the interior ministry, alliances and groupings of electors to present lists of candidates. Parties and federations intending to form an alliance are required to inform the relevant electoral commission within 10 days of the election call—15 before 1985—whereas groupings of electors need to secure the signature of at least one percent of the electorate in the constituencies for which they seek election—one permille of the electorate, with a compulsory minimum of 500 signatures, until 1985—disallowing electors from signing for more than one list. Also since 2011, parties, federations or alliances that have not obtained a mandate in either chamber of the Cortes at the preceding election are required to secure the signature of at least 0.1 percent of electors in the aforementioned constituencies. Amendments in 2007 required a balanced composition of men and women in the electoral lists, so that candidates of either sex made up at least 40 percent of the total composition; further amendments in 2024 required the use of a zipper system.

== Deputies ==
Deputies 1977–present
Key to parties U.Podemos Podemos PSOE CDS Cs UCD PP CP AP Vox
Legislature	Election	Distribution
Constituent	1977	2 / 3
1st	1979	2 / 3
2nd	1982	3 / 2
3rd	1986	2 / 1 / 2
4th	1989	2 / 3
5th	1993	2 / 3
6th	1996	2 / 3
7th	2000	2 / 3
8th	2004	2 / 3
9th	2008	2 / 3
10th	2011	2 / 3
11th	2015	1 / 1 / 1 / 2
12th	2016	1 / 1 / 1 / 2
13th	2019 (Apr)	2 / 1 / 1 / 1
14th	2019 (Nov)	2 / 2 / 1
15th	2023	2 / 2 / 1

== General elections ==
=== 2026 ===
Summary of the 29 November 2026 Congress of Deputies election results in Valladolid
Parties and alliances	Popular vote			Seats	
Parties and alliances	Votes	%	±pp	Total	+/−
People's Party (PP)					
Spanish Socialist Workers' Party (PSOE)					
Vox (Vox)					
Broad Front (FA)^{1}			n/a		
We Can (Podemos)^{1}			n/a		
Animalist Party with the Environment (PACMA)					
Workers' Front (FO)					
Blank Seats to Leave Empty Seats (EB)					
For a Fairer World (M+J)					
Communist Party of the Workers of Spain (PCTE)					
Spanish Phalanx of the CNSO (FE de las JONS)					
The Party is Over (SALF)			New		
Nationalist Party of Castile and León–Citizen Reformist Union (PANCAL–URCI)			New		
Blank ballots					
Total				5	±0
Valid votes					
Invalid votes					
Votes cast / turnout					
Abstentions					
Registered voters	440,219				
Sources
Footnotes: ^{1} Within the Unite alliance in the 2023 election.

=== 2023 ===
Summary of the 23 July 2023 Congress of Deputies election results in Valladolid
Parties and alliances	Popular vote			Seats	
Parties and alliances	Votes	%	±pp	Total	+/−
People's Party (PP)	129,170	40.84	+11.35	2	±0
Spanish Socialist Workers' Party (PSOE)	103,596	32.75	+2.45	2	±0
Vox (Vox)	47,948	15.16	–2.93	1	±0
Unite (Sumar)^{1}	28,049	8.87	–2.15	0	±0
Empty Spain (España Vaciada)	1,226	0.39	New	0	±0
Animalist Party with the Environment (PACMA)^{2}	1,105	0.35	–0.32	0	±0
Workers' Front (FO)	601	0.19	New	0	±0
Blank Seats to Leave Empty Seats (EB)	583	0.18	New	0	±0
Castilian Unity (UdCa)	463	0.15	New	0	±0
For a Fairer World (PUM+J)	376	0.12	–0.07	0	±0
Communist Party of the Workers of Spain (PCTE)	335	0.11	+0.02	0	±0
Spanish Phalanx of the CNSO (FE de las JONS)	164	0.05	±0.00	0	±0
Zero Cuts (Recortes Cero)	159	0.05	–0.14	0	±0
Civic Force (Fuerza Cívica)	115	0.04	New	0	±0
Blank ballots	2,419	0.76	–0.25		
Total	316,309			5	±0
Valid votes	316,309	99.06	+0.12		
Invalid votes	3,003	0.94	–0.12		
Votes cast / turnout	319,312	74.02	+1.26		
Abstentions	112,069	25.98	–1.26		
Registered voters	431,381				
Sources
Footnotes: ^{1} Unite results are compared to United We Can totals in the November 2019 election.; ^{2} Animalist Party with the Environment results are compared to Animalist Party Against Mistreatment of Animals totals in the November 2019 election.

=== November 2019 ===
Summary of the 10 November 2019 Congress of Deputies election results in Valladolid
Parties and alliances	Popular vote			Seats	
Parties and alliances	Votes	%	±pp	Total	+/−
Spanish Socialist Workers' Party (PSOE)	94,384	30.30	+1.41	2	±0
People's Party (PP)	91,857	29.49	+6.19	2	+1
Vox (Vox)	56,353	18.09	+4.43	1	±0
United We Can (Podemos–IU)	34,313	11.02	–0.66	0	±0
Citizens–Party of the Citizenry (Cs)	26,947	8.65	–11.49	0	–1
Animalist Party Against Mistreatment of Animals (PACMA)	2,088	0.67	–0.13	0	±0
Zero Cuts–Green Group–PCAS–TC (Recortes Cero–GV–PCAS–TC)	594	0.19	+0.03	0	±0
For a Fairer World (PUM+J)	586	0.19	+0.05	0	±0
Regionalist Union of Castile and León (Unión Regionalista)	530	0.17	+0.02	0	±0
Communist Party of the Workers of Spain (PCTE)	281	0.09	+0.01	0	±0
Communist Party of the Peoples of Spain (PCPE)	223	0.07	–0.02	0	±0
Spanish Phalanx of the CNSO (FE de las JONS)	151	0.05	–0.02	0	±0
Blank ballots	3,147	1.01	+0.18		
Total	311,454			5	±0
Valid votes	311,454	98.94	+0.04		
Invalid votes	3,333	1.06	–0.04		
Votes cast / turnout	314,787	72.76	–5.91		
Abstentions	117,868	27.24	+5.91		
Registered voters	432,655				

=== April 2019 ===
Summary of the 28 April 2019 Congress of Deputies election results in Valladolid
Parties and alliances	Popular vote			Seats	
Parties and alliances	Votes	%	±pp	Total	+/−
Spanish Socialist Workers' Party (PSOE)	97,244	28.89	+6.16	2	+1
People's Party (PP)	78,433	23.30	–18.51	1	–1
Citizens–Party of the Citizenry (Cs)	67,775	20.14	+4.53	1	±0
Vox (Vox)	45,965	13.66	+13.32	1	+1
United We Can (Podemos–IU–Equo)	39,305	11.68	–4.67	0	–1
Animalist Party Against Mistreatment of Animals (PACMA)	2,699	0.80	+0.10	0	±0
Zero Cuts–Green Group–PCAS–TC (Recortes Cero–GV–PCAS–TC)	545	0.16	–0.01	0	±0
Regionalist Union of Castile and León (Unión Regionalista)	490	0.15	New	0	±0
For a Fairer World (PUM+J)	473	0.14	New	0	±0
Communist Party of the Peoples of Spain (PCPE)	313	0.09	–0.01	0	±0
Communist Party of the Workers of Spain (PCTE)	282	0.08	New	0	±0
Spanish Phalanx of the CNSO (FE de las JONS)	229	0.07	–0.07	0	±0
Blank ballots	2,801	0.83	+0.12		
Total	336,554			5	±0
Valid votes	336,554	98.90	±0.00		
Invalid votes	3,732	1.10	±0.00		
Votes cast / turnout	340,286	78.67	+4.94		
Abstentions	92,277	21.33	–4.94		
Registered voters	432,563				

=== 2016 ===
Summary of the 26 June 2016 Congress of Deputies election results in Valladolid
Parties and alliances	Popular vote			Seats	
Parties and alliances	Votes	%	±pp	Total	+/−
People's Party (PP)	132,026	41.81	+4.91	2	±0
Spanish Socialist Workers' Party (PSOE)	71,780	22.73	+1.17	1	±0
United We Can (Podemos–IU–Equo–IzCa)^{1}	51,637	16.35	–4.38	1	±0
Citizens–Party of the Citizenry (C's)	49,283	15.61	–1.53	1	±0
Citizens of Democratic Centre–Independent Candidacy (CCD–CI)	2,672	0.85	+0.37	0	±0
Animalist Party Against Mistreatment of Animals (PACMA)	2,225	0.70	+0.17	0	±0
Vox (Vox)	1,078	0.34	–0.03	0	±0
Union, Progress and Democracy (UPyD)	1,068	0.34	–0.55	0	±0
Zero Cuts–Green Group (Recortes Cero–GV)	524	0.17	+0.02	0	±0
Spanish Phalanx of the CNSO (FE de las JONS)	454	0.14	+0.01	0	±0
Communist Party of the Peoples of Spain (PCPE)	316	0.10	–0.03	0	±0
Internationalist Solidarity and Self-Management (SAIn)	210	0.07	–0.01	0	±0
Libertarian Party (P–LIB)	146	0.05	New	0	±0
Alliance of the Democratic Centre (ALCD)	115	0.04	New	0	±0
Blank ballots	2,234	0.71	–0.11		
Total	315,768			5	±0
Valid votes	315,768	98.90	–0.23		
Invalid votes	3,512	1.10	+0.23		
Votes cast / turnout	319,280	73.73	–2.74		
Abstentions	113,776	26.27	+2.74		
Registered voters	433,056				
Sources
Footnotes: ^{1} United We Can results are compared to the combined totals of We Can and Popular Unity in Common–United Left–Castilian Left in the 2015 election.

=== 2015 ===
Summary of the 20 December 2015 Congress of Deputies election results in Valladolid
Parties and alliances	Popular vote			Seats	
Parties and alliances	Votes	%	±pp	Total	+/−
People's Party (PP)	121,323	36.90	–16.01	2	–1
Spanish Socialist Workers' Party (PSOE)	70,879	21.56	–7.40	1	–1
Citizens–Party of the Citizenry (C's)	56,347	17.14	New	1	+1
We Can (Podemos)	50,204	15.27	New	1	+1
Popular Unity in Common–United Left–Castilian Left (UPeC–IU–IzCa)	17,935	5.46	–1.96	0	±0
Union, Progress and Democracy (UPyD)	2,940	0.89	–6.32	0	±0
Animalist Party Against Mistreatment of Animals (PACMA)	1,735	0.53	+0.15	0	±0
Citizens of Democratic Centre (CCD)	1,579	0.48	+0.39	0	±0
Vox (Vox)	1,230	0.37	New	0	±0
Zero Cuts–Green Group (Recortes Cero–GV)	489	0.15	New	0	±0
Communist Party of the Peoples of Spain (PCPE)	429	0.13	+0.01	0	±0
Spanish Phalanx of the CNSO (FE de las JONS)	411	0.13	–0.03	0	±0
National Democracy (DN)	289	0.09	–0.04	0	±0
Internationalist Solidarity and Self-Management (SAIn)	272	0.08	–0.03	0	±0
Blank ballots	2,683	0.82	–0.63		
Total	328,745			5	±0
Valid votes	328,745	99.13	+0.24		
Invalid votes	2,886	0.87	–0.24		
Votes cast / turnout	331,631	76.47	+0.51		
Abstentions	102,036	23.53	–0.51		
Registered voters	433,667				

=== 2011 ===
Summary of the 20 November 2011 Congress of Deputies election results in Valladolid
Parties and alliances	Popular vote			Seats	
Parties and alliances	Votes	%	±pp	Total	+/−
People's Party (PP)	172,671	52.91	+3.63	3	±0
Spanish Socialist Workers' Party (PSOE)	94,521	28.96	–13.67	2	±0
United Left of Castile and León: Plural Left (IUCyL)	24,223	7.42	+4.25	0	±0
Union, Progress and Democracy (UPyD)	23,536	7.21	+5.25	0	±0
Equo (Equo)	2,161	0.66	New	0	±0
Animalist Party Against Mistreatment of Animals (PACMA)	1,244	0.38	+0.23	0	±0
For a Fairer World (PUM+J)	581	0.18	+0.08	0	±0
Regionalist Unity of Castile and León (URCL)	535	0.16	+0.04	0	±0
Spanish Phalanx of the CNSO (FE de las JONS)	522	0.16	+0.09	0	±0
National Democracy (DN)	426	0.13	+0.06	0	±0
Communist Party of the Peoples of Spain (PCPE)	380	0.12	+0.01	0	±0
Internationalist Solidarity and Self-Management (SAIn)	344	0.11	+0.05	0	±0
Citizens of Democratic Centre (CCD)	303	0.09	New	0	±0
Communist Unification of Spain (UCE)	167	0.05	New	0	±0
Blank ballots	4,719	1.45	+0.36		
Total	326,333			5	±0
Valid votes	326,333	98.89	–0.62		
Invalid votes	3,677	1.11	+0.62		
Votes cast / turnout	330,010	75.96	–5.05		
Abstentions	104,467	24.04	+5.05		
Registered voters	434,477				

=== 2008 ===
Summary of the 9 March 2008 Congress of Deputies election results in Valladolid
Parties and alliances	Popular vote			Seats	
Parties and alliances	Votes	%	±pp	Total	+/−
People's Party (PP)	172,085	49.28	+2.49	3	±0
Spanish Socialist Workers' Party (PSOE)	148,878	42.63	–1.97	2	±0
United Left–Alternative (IU)	11,065	3.17	–0.57	0	±0
Union, Progress and Democracy (UPyD)	6,858	1.96	New	0	±0
The Greens (Verdes)	892	0.26	New	0	±0
The Greens of Europe (LVdE)	788	0.23	New	0	±0
Commoners' Land (TC)	656	0.19	–0.20	0	±0
Social Democratic Party (PSD)	656	0.19	New	0	±0
Anti-Bullfighting Party Against Mistreatment of Animals (PACMA)	535	0.15	New	0	±0
Citizens–Party of the Citizenry (C's)	471	0.13	New	0	±0
Regionalist Unity of Castile and León (URCL)	423	0.12	New	0	±0
Communist Party of the Castilian People (PCPC–PCPE)	386	0.11	+0.04	0	±0
For a Fairer World (PUM+J)	334	0.10	New	0	±0
Citizens for Blank Votes (CenB)	283	0.08	–0.08	0	±0
Spanish Phalanx of the CNSO (FE de las JONS)	248	0.07	+0.01	0	±0
National Democracy (DN)	243	0.07	+0.03	0	±0
Internationalist Solidarity and Self-Management (SAIn)	198	0.06	New	0	±0
Humanist Party (PH)	138	0.04	–0.10	0	±0
Spanish Alternative (AES)	118	0.03	New	0	±0
National Alliance (AN)	89	0.03	New	0	±0
Authentic Phalanx (FA)	87	0.02	–0.01	0	±0
Blank ballots	3,795	1.09	–1.09		
Total	349,226			5	±0
Valid votes	349,226	99.51	+0.09		
Invalid votes	1,733	0.49	–0.09		
Votes cast / turnout	350,959	81.01	–0.15		
Abstentions	82,245	18.99	+0.15		
Registered voters	433,204				

=== 2004 ===
Summary of the 14 March 2004 Congress of Deputies election results in Valladolid
Parties and alliances	Popular vote			Seats	
Parties and alliances	Votes	%	±pp	Total	+/−
People's Party (PP)	163,009	46.79	–6.35	3	±0
Spanish Socialist Workers' Party (PSOE)	155,401	44.60	+9.47	2	±0
United Left (IU)	13,029	3.74	–2.32	0	±0
Independent Candidacy–The Party of Castile and León (CI–PCL)	2,421	0.69	–0.63	0	±0
Cannabis Party for Legalization and Normalization (PCLyN)	1,851	0.53	New	0	±0
Commoners' Land–Castilian Nationalist Party (TC–PNC)	1,364	0.39	–0.57	0	±0
Democratic and Social Centre (CDS)	1,015	0.29	+0.11	0	±0
Citizens for Blank Votes (CenB)	562	0.16	New	0	±0
Humanist Party (PH)	491	0.14	–0.03	0	±0
Family and Life Party (PFyV)	367	0.11	New	0	±0
Communist Party of the Castilian People (PCPC–PCPE)	236	0.07	–0.08	0	±0
Spanish Phalanx of the CNSO (FE de las JONS)^{1}	213	0.06	–0.01	0	±0
Republican Left (IR)	157	0.05	New	0	±0
Spanish Democratic Party (PADE)	152	0.04	–0.01	0	±0
The Phalanx (FE)	128	0.04	–0.02	0	±0
National Democracy (DN)	123	0.04	New	0	±0
Spain 2000 (E–2000)	119	0.03	–0.03	0	±0
Authentic Phalanx (FA)	109	0.03	New	0	±0
Republican Social Movement (MSR)	77	0.02	New	0	±0
Blank ballots	7,578	2.18	–0.06		
Total	348,402			5	±0
Valid votes	348,402	99.42	+0.10		
Invalid votes	2,042	0.58	–0.10		
Votes cast / turnout	350,444	81.16	+5.94		
Abstentions	81,330	18.84	–5.94		
Registered voters	431,774				
Sources
Footnotes: ^{1} Spanish Phalanx of the CNSO results are compared to Independent Spanish Phalanx–Phalanx 2000 totals in the 2000 election.

=== 2000 ===
Summary of the 12 March 2000 Congress of Deputies election results in Valladolid
Parties and alliances	Popular vote			Seats	
Parties and alliances	Votes	%	±pp	Total	+/−
People's Party (PP)	168,780	53.14	+4.29	3	±0
Spanish Socialist Workers' Party–Progressives (PSOE–p)	111,588	35.13	–0.71	2	±0
United Left (IU)	19,246	6.06	–6.57	0	±0
Independent Candidacy–The Party of Castile and León (CI–PCL)	4,184	1.32	New	0	±0
Commoners' Land–Castilian Nationalist Party (TC–PNC)	2,685	0.85	+0.58	0	±0
Regionalist Unity of Castile and León (URCL)	908	0.29	+0.03	0	±0
Natural Law Party (PLN)	641	0.20	New	0	±0
Centrist Union–Democratic and Social Centre (UC–CDS)	559	0.18	–0.10	0	±0
Humanist Party (PH)	529	0.17	+0.01	0	±0
Communist Party of the Peoples of Spain (PCPE)	491	0.15	+0.05	0	±0
Independent Spanish Phalanx–Phalanx 2000 (FEI–FE 2000)	238	0.07	New	0	±0
The Phalanx (FE)	197	0.06	New	0	±0
Spain 2000 Platform (ES2000)	183	0.06	New	0	±0
Spanish Democratic Party (PADE)	164	0.05	New	0	±0
Carlist Party (PC)	90	0.03	New	0	±0
Blank ballots	7,117	2.24	+0.80		
Total	317,600			5	±0
Valid votes	317,600	99.32	–0.15		
Invalid votes	2,160	0.68	+0.15		
Votes cast / turnout	319,760	75.22	–6.26		
Abstentions	105,363	24.78	+6.26		
Registered voters	425,123				

=== 1996 ===
Summary of the 3 March 1996 Congress of Deputies election results in Valladolid
Parties and alliances	Popular vote			Seats	
Parties and alliances	Votes	%	±pp	Total	+/−
People's Party (PP)	164,840	48.85	+3.49	3	±0
Spanish Socialist Workers' Party (PSOE)	120,941	35.84	–0.24	2	±0
United Left of Castile and León (IUCL)	42,622	12.63	+0.92	0	±0
Centrist Union (UC)	942	0.28	–3.28	0	±0
Commoners' Land–Castilian Nationalist Party (TC–PNC)	925	0.27	+0.13	0	±0
Regionalist Unity of Castile and León (URCL)	867	0.26	–0.02	0	±0
Humanist Party (PH)	543	0.16	+0.12	0	±0
Communist Party of the Peoples of Spain (PCPE)	350	0.10	New	0	±0
Authentic Spanish Phalanx (FEA)	301	0.09	New	0	±0
Workers' Revolutionary Party (PRT)	263	0.08	New	0	±0
Blank ballots	4,844	1.44	+0.19		
Total	337,438			5	±0
Valid votes	337,438	99.47	+0.20		
Invalid votes	1,786	0.53	–0.20		
Votes cast / turnout	339,224	81.48	+0.97		
Abstentions	77,116	18.52	–0.97		
Registered voters	416,340				

=== 1993 ===
Summary of the 6 June 1993 Congress of Deputies election results in Valladolid
Parties and alliances	Popular vote			Seats	
Parties and alliances	Votes	%	±pp	Total	+/−
People's Party (PP)	145,368	45.36	+7.25	3	±0
Spanish Socialist Workers' Party (PSOE)	115,617	36.08	+0.15	2	±0
United Left of Castile and León (IU)	37,532	11.71	+2.24	0	±0
Democratic and Social Centre (CDS)	11,408	3.56	–7.89	0	±0
The Greens (Verdes)	2,141	0.67	New	0	±0
The Ecologists (LE)	1,220	0.38	–0.79	0	±0
Regionalist Unity of Castile and León (URCL)	908	0.28	New	0	±0
Ruiz-Mateos Group (ARM)	573	0.18	–0.46	0	±0
Commoners' Land–Castilian Nationalist Party (TC–PNC)	441	0.14	New	0	±0
Spanish Phalanx of the CNSO (FE–JONS)	342	0.11	–0.08	0	±0
Castilianist Union (UC)	222	0.07	New	0	±0
Leonese People's Union (UPL)	149	0.05	New	0	±0
Natural Law Party (PLN)	132	0.04	New	0	±0
Humanist Party (PH)	132	0.04	–0.08	0	±0
Social Democratic Spanish Christian Monarchy (MCES)	107	0.03	New	0	±0
Coalition for a New Socialist Party (CNPS)	99	0.03	New	0	±0
Party of El Bierzo (PB)	86	0.03	New	0	±0
Communist Unification of Spain (UCE)	0	0.00	New	0	±0
Blank ballots	3,991	1.25	+0.20		
Total	320,468			5	±0
Valid votes	320,468	99.27	+0.11		
Invalid votes	2,357	0.73	–0.11		
Votes cast / turnout	322,825	80.51	+5.60		
Abstentions	78,143	19.49	–5.60		
Registered voters	400,968				

=== 1989 ===
Summary of the 29 October 1989 Congress of Deputies election results in Valladolid
Parties and alliances	Popular vote			Seats	
Parties and alliances	Votes	%	±pp	Total	+/−
People's Party (PP)^{1}	107,695	38.11	+6.18	3	+1
Spanish Socialist Workers' Party (PSOE)	101,532	35.93	–5.78	2	±0
Democratic and Social Centre (CDS)	32,342	11.45	–5.52	0	–1
United Left (IU)	26,753	9.47	+6.48	0	±0
The Ecologist Greens (LVE)	3,311	1.17	New	0	±0
Workers' Party of Spain–Communist Unity (PTE–UC)^{2}	2,264	0.80	–1.50	0	±0
Ruiz-Mateos Group (Ruiz-Mateos)	1,802	0.64	New	0	±0
Workers' Socialist Party (PST)	1,386	0.49	–0.01	0	±0
Nationalist Party of Castile and León (PANCAL)	947	0.34	–0.04	0	±0
Spanish Phalanx of the CNSO (FE–JONS)	541	0.19	–0.20	0	±0
Communist Party of the Peoples of Spain (PCPE)	493	0.17	New	0	±0
Humanist Party (PH)	347	0.12	New	0	±0
Centrist Unity–Democratic Spanish Party (PED)	175	0.06	New	0	±0
Communist Party of Spain (Marxist–Leninist) (PCE (m–l))^{3}	0	0.00	–0.19	0	±0
Blank ballots	2,967	1.05	+0.19		
Total	282,555			5	±0
Valid votes	282,555	99.16	+1.03		
Invalid votes	2,398	0.84	–1.03		
Votes cast / turnout	284,953	74.91	+1.23		
Abstentions	95,442	25.09	–1.23		
Registered voters	380,395				
Sources
Footnotes: ^{1} People's Party results are compared to People's Coalition totals in the 1986 election.; ^{2} Workers' Party of Spain–Communist Unity results are compared to Communists' Unity Board totals in the 1986 election.; ^{3} Communist Party of Spain (Marxist–Leninist) results are compared to Republican Popular Unity totals in the 1986 election.

=== 1986 ===
Summary of the 22 June 1986 Congress of Deputies election results in Valladolid
Parties and alliances	Popular vote			Seats	
Parties and alliances	Votes	%	±pp	Total	+/−
Spanish Socialist Workers' Party (PSOE)	115,617	41.71	–9.62	2	–1
People's Coalition (AP–PDP–PL)^{1}	88,500	31.93	+0.63	2	±0
Democratic and Social Centre (CDS)	47,042	16.97	+12.78	1	+1
United Left (IU)^{2}	8,280	2.99	–0.43	0	±0
Communists' Unity Board (MUC)	6,372	2.30	New	0	±0
Democratic Reformist Party (PRD)	3,404	1.23	New	0	±0
Workers' Socialist Party (PST)	1,376	0.50	–0.05	0	±0
Spanish Phalanx of the CNSO (FE–JONS)	1,080	0.39	+0.39	0	±0
Nationalist Party of Castile and León (PANCAL)	1,047	0.38	New	0	±0
Communist Unification of Spain (UCE)	726	0.26	+0.10	0	±0
Republican Popular Unity (UPR)^{3}	526	0.19	+0.06	0	±0
Internationalist Socialist Workers' Party (POSI)	514	0.19	New	0	±0
Party of the Communists of Catalonia (PCC)	287	0.10	New	0	±0
Blank ballots	2,395	0.86	+0.10		
Total	277,166			5	±0
Valid votes	277,166	98.13	+1.07		
Invalid votes	5,292	1.87	–1.07		
Votes cast / turnout	282,458	73.68	–10.78		
Abstentions	100,906	26.32	+10.78		
Registered voters	383,364				
Sources
Footnotes: ^{1} People's Coalition results are compared to People's Alliance–People's Democratic Party totals in the 1982 election.; ^{2} United Left results are compared to Communist Party of Spain totals in the 1982 election.; ^{3} Republican Popular Unity results are compared to Communist Party of Spain (Marxist–Leninist) totals in the 1982 election.

=== 1982 ===
Summary of the 28 October 1982 Congress of Deputies election results in Valladolid
Parties and alliances	Popular vote			Seats	
Parties and alliances	Votes	%	±pp	Total	+/−
Spanish Socialist Workers' Party (PSOE)	144,409	51.33	+22.23	3	+1
People's Alliance–People's Democratic Party (AP–PDP)^{1}	88,057	31.30	+23.25	2	+2
Union of the Democratic Centre (UCD)	20,704	7.36	–30.66	0	–3
Democratic and Social Centre (CDS)	11,786	4.19	New	0	±0
Communist Party of Spain (PCE)	9,622	3.42	–4.03	0	±0
New Force (FN)^{2}	2,229	0.79	–2.86	0	±0
Workers' Socialist Party (PST)	1,555	0.55	New	0	±0
Communist Unification of Spain (UCE)	453	0.16	New	0	±0
Communist Party of Spain (Marxist–Leninist) (PCE (m–l))	360	0.13	New	0	±0
Socialist Party (PS)^{3}	0	0.00	–1.14	0	±0
Revolutionary Communist League (LCR)	0	0.00	–0.26	0	±0
Communist League–Internationalist Socialist Workers' Coalition (LC (COSI))	0	0.00	±0.00	0	±0
Spanish Phalanx of the CNSO (FE–JONS)	0	0.00	New	0	±0
Communist Movement of Castile and León (MC–CL)	0	0.00	–0.72	0	±0
Blank ballots	2,150	0.76	+0.17		
Total	281,325			5	±0
Valid votes	281,325	97.06	–1.98		
Invalid votes	8,521	2.94	+1.98		
Votes cast / turnout	289,846	84.46	+10.55		
Abstentions	53,325	15.54	–10.55		
Registered voters	343,171				
Sources
Footnotes: ^{1} People's Alliance–People's Democratic Party results are compared to Democratic Coalition totals in the 1979 election.; ^{2} New Force results are compared to National Union totals in the 1979 election.; ^{3} Socialist Party results are compared to Spanish Socialist Workers' Party (historical) totals in the 1979 election.

=== 1979 ===
Summary of the 1 March 1979 Congress of Deputies election results in Valladolid
Parties and alliances	Popular vote			Seats	
Parties and alliances	Votes	%	±pp	Total	+/−
Union of the Democratic Centre (UCD)	93,062	38.02	–4.40	3	±0
Spanish Socialist Workers' Party (PSOE)^{1}	71,230	29.10	–4.58	2	±0
Democratic Coalition (CD)^{2}	19,706	8.05	–0.31	0	±0
Communist Party of Spain (PCE)	18,229	7.45	+1.02	0	±0
Nationalist Party of Castile and León (PANCAL)	13,380	5.47	New	0	±0
National Union (UN)^{3}	8,931	3.65	+1.63	0	±0
Spanish Ruralist Party (PRE)	3,528	1.44	New	0	±0
Party of Labour of Spain (PTE)^{4}	3,117	1.27	+0.22	0	±0
Spanish Socialist Workers' Party (historical) (PSOEh)	2,802	1.14	New	0	±0
Communist Movement–Organization of Communist Left (MC–OIC)^{5}	1,755	0.72	+0.11	0	±0
Workers' Revolutionary Organization (ORT)^{6}	1,570	0.64	+0.14	0	±0
Spanish Phalanx of the CNSO (Authentic) (FE–JONS(A))	1,164	0.48	–0.67	0	±0
Communist Organization of Spain (Red Flag) (OCE–BR)	1,045	0.43	New	0	±0
Workers' Communist Party (PCT)	1,032	0.42	New	0	±0
Liberal Party (PL)	745	0.30	New	0	±0
Republican Left (IR)	740	0.30	New	0	±0
Authentic Spanish Phalanx (FEA)	643	0.26	New	0	±0
Revolutionary Communist League (LCR)^{7}	627	0.26	–0.13	0	±0
Communist League (LC)	0	0.00	New	0	±0
Blank ballots	1,438	0.59	+0.18		
Total	244,744			5	±0
Valid votes	244,744	99.04	+0.53		
Invalid votes	2,373	0.96	–0.53		
Votes cast / turnout	247,117	73.91	–10.46		
Abstentions	87,246	26.09	+10.46		
Registered voters	334,363				
Sources
Footnotes: ^{1} Spanish Socialist Workers' Party results are compared to the combined totals of Spanish Socialist Workers' Party and People's Socialist Party–Socialist Unity in the 1977 election.; ^{2} Democratic Coalition results are compared to People's Alliance totals in the 1977 election.; ^{3} National Union results are compared to National Alliance July 18 totals in the 1977 election.; ^{4} Party of Labour of Spain results are compared to Democratic Left Front totals in the 1977 election.; ^{5} Communist Movement–Organization of Communist Left results are compared to Regionalist Left Unitary Candidacy totals in the 1977 election.; ^{6} Workers' Revolutionary Organization results are compared to Workers' Electoral Group totals in the 1977 election.; ^{7} Revolutionary Communist League results are compared to Front for Workers' Unity totals in the 1977 election.

=== 1977 ===
Summary of the 15 June 1977 Congress of Deputies election results in Valladolid
Parties and alliances	Popular vote			Seats	
Parties and alliances	Votes	%	±pp	Total	+/−
Union of the Democratic Centre (UCD)	104,145	42.42	n/a	3	n/a
Spanish Socialist Workers' Party (PSOE)	76,308	31.08	n/a	2	n/a
People's Alliance (AP)	20,521	8.36	n/a	0	n/a
Communist Party of Spain (PCE)	15,798	6.43	n/a	0	n/a
Federation of Christian Democracy (FPD–ID)	6,792	2.77	n/a	0	n/a
People's Socialist Party–Socialist Unity (PSP–US)	6,372	2.60	n/a	0	n/a
National Alliance July 18 (AN18)	4,952	2.02	n/a	0	n/a
Spanish Phalanx of the CNSO (Authentic) (FE–JONS(A))	2,813	1.15	n/a	0	n/a
Democratic Left Front (FDI)	2,575	1.05	n/a	0	n/a
Regionalist Left Unitary Candidacy (CUIR)	1,504	0.61	n/a	0	n/a
Workers' Electoral Group (AET)	1,228	0.50	n/a	0	n/a
Front for Workers' Unity (FUT)	964	0.39	n/a	0	n/a
Group of Carlist Electors (ADC)	542	0.22	n/a	0	n/a
Blank ballots	1,004	0.41	n/a		
Total	245,518			5	n/a
Valid votes	245,518	98.51	n/a		
Invalid votes	3,705	1.49	n/a		
Votes cast / turnout	249,223	84.37	n/a		
Abstentions	46,187	15.63	n/a		
Registered voters	295,410				

== Bibliography ==
- Ley 1/1977, de 4 de enero, para la Reforma Política (Fundamental Law 1/1977). Official State Gazette (in Spanish). 4 January 1977. BOE-A-1977-165.
- Real Decreto-ley 20/1977, de 18 de marzo, sobre Normas Electorales (Royal Decree-Law 20/1977). Official State Gazette (in Spanish). 18 March 1977. BOE-A-1977-7445.
- Constitución Española (Constitution). Official State Gazette (in Spanish). 27 December 1978. BOE-A-1978-31229.
- Ley Orgánica 5/1985, de 19 de junio, del Régimen Electoral General (Organic Law 5/1985). Official State Gazette (in Spanish). 19 June 1985. BOE-A-1985-11672.
- Carreras de Odriozola, Albert; Tafunell Sambola, Xavier (2005) [1989]. Estadísticas históricas de España, siglos XIX-XX (PDF) (in Spanish). Vol. 1 (II ed.). Bilbao: Fundación BBVA. pp. 1072–1097. ISBN 84-96515-00-1. Archived from the original (PDF) on 24 September 2015.
