= Ataquines =

Coordinates: 41°11′N 4°48′W

Ataquines, Spain
- Flag Coat of arms

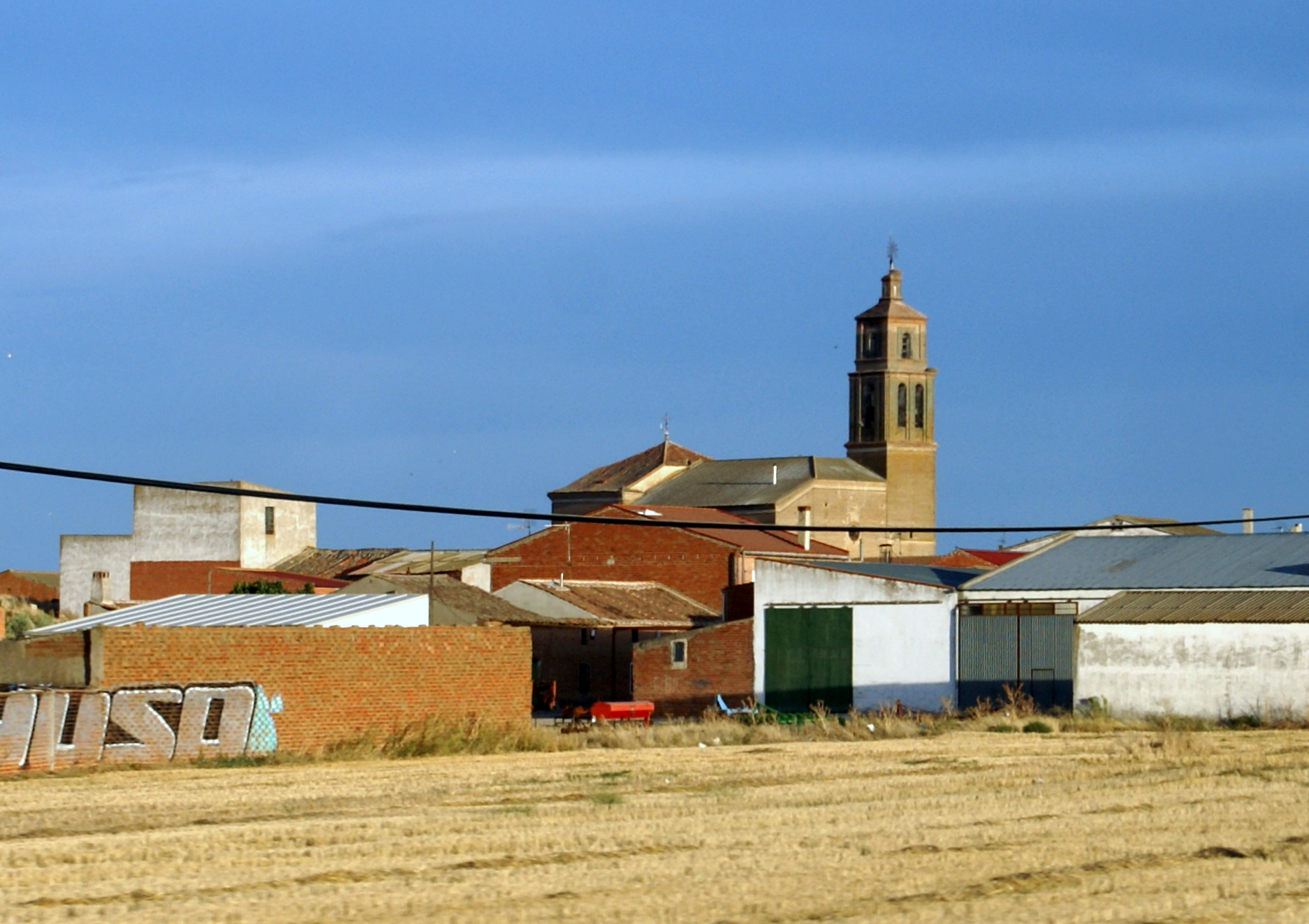
- Country: Spain
- Autonomous community: Castile and León
- Province: Valladolid
- Municipality: Ataquines

Area
  - Total: 42.6 km^{2} (16.4 sq mi)
- Elevation: 800 m (2,600 ft)

Population (2025-01-01)
  - Total: 580
  - Density: 14/km^{2} (35/sq mi)
- Time zone: UTC+1 (CET)
  - Summer (DST): UTC+2 (CEST)

Ataquines is a municipality located in the province of Valladolid, Castile and León, Spain. According to the 2004 census (INE), the municipality had a population of 816 inhabitants.
