= Aldeamayor de San Martín =

Coordinates: 41°31′N 4°38′W

Aldeamayor de San Martín, Spain
- Coat of arms

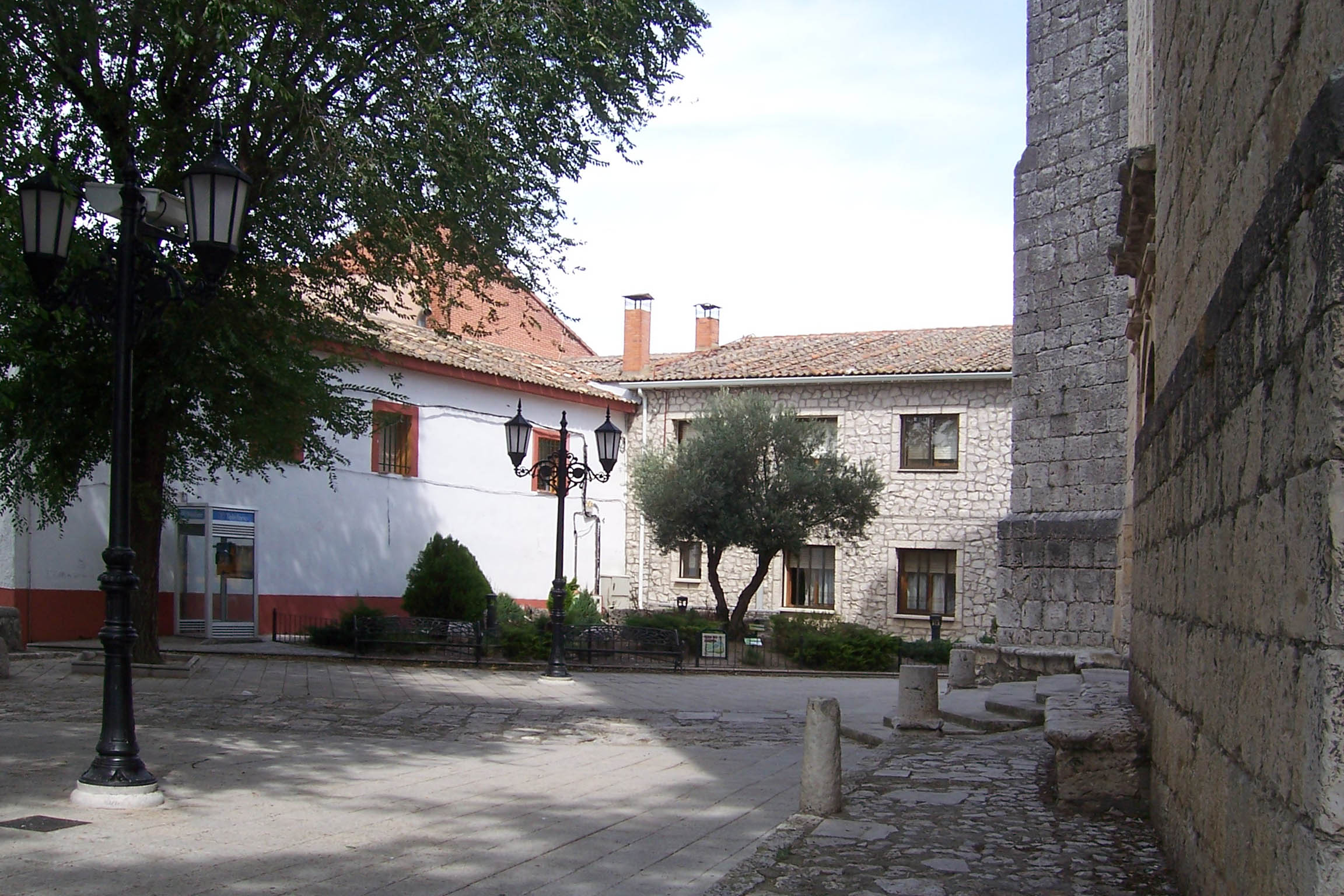
- main square
- Country: Spain
- Autonomous community: Castile and León
- Province: Valladolid
- Municipality: Aldeamayor de San Martín

Area
  - Total: 53.56 km^{2} (20.68 sq mi)
- Elevation: 705 m (2,313 ft)

Population (2025-01-01)
  - Total: 6,290
  - Density: 117/km^{2} (304/sq mi)
- Time zone: UTC+1 (CET)
  - Summer (DST): UTC+2 (CEST)

Aldeamayor de San Martín is a municipality located in the province of Valladolid, Castile and León, Spain. According to the 2014 census (INE), the municipality has a population of 5,060 inhabitants.

It is located in the region of Tierra de Pine, 17 km south of the capital of the province. The village is located in the area known as "Satin Portillo", covering in the Middle Ages a vast territory, dominated from Portillo, belonging to the Counts of Benavente. Since 1986, it belongs to the Community of Villa y Tierra de Portillo, whose expertise is asset management, and the Commonwealth "Pine Land, collection and disposal of solid waste, and social services.

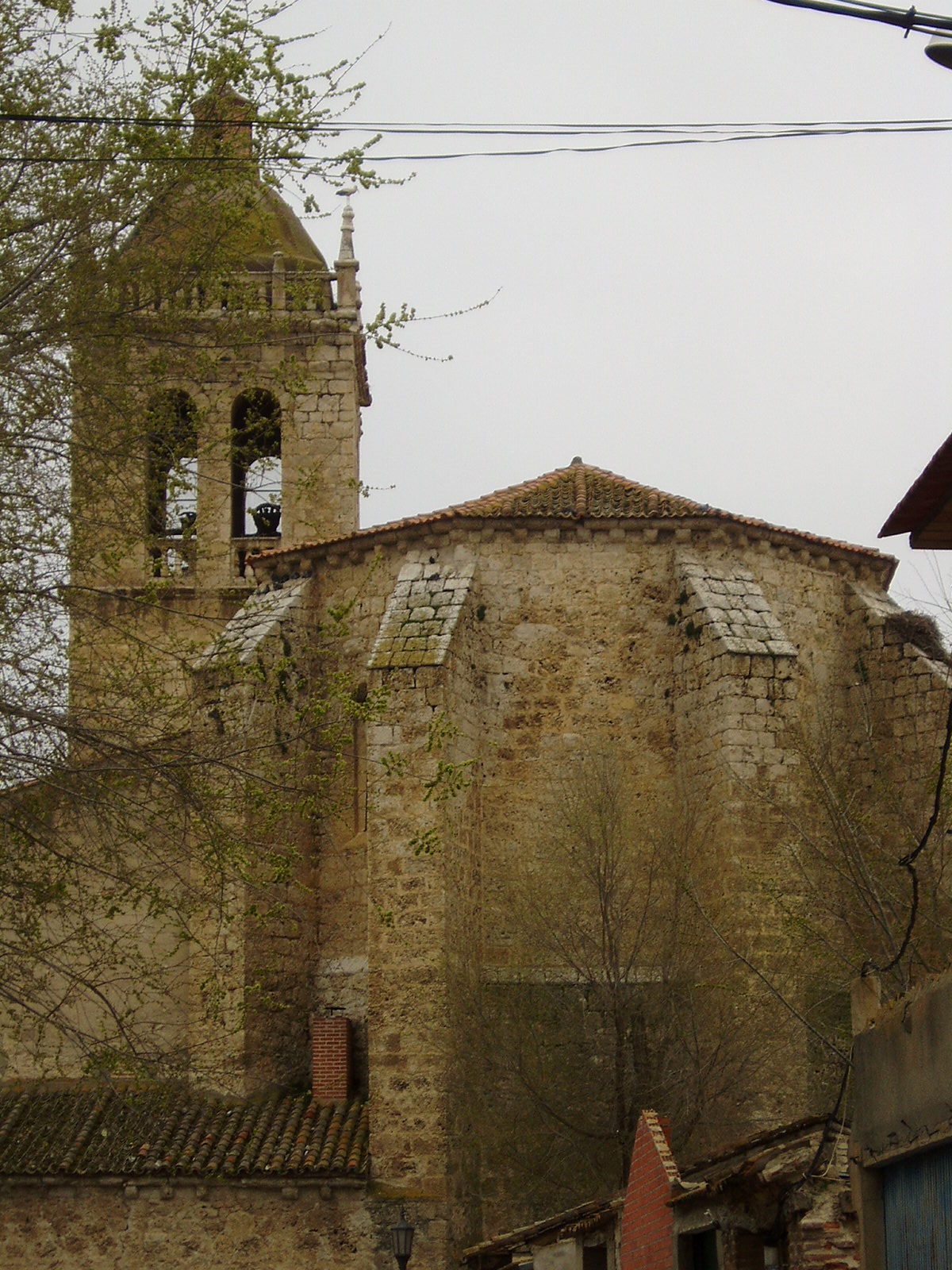
Church of San Martín de Tours, built in the 15th century.

== See also ==
- Cuisine of the province of Valladolid
