= Bernuy-Zapardiel =

- municipality
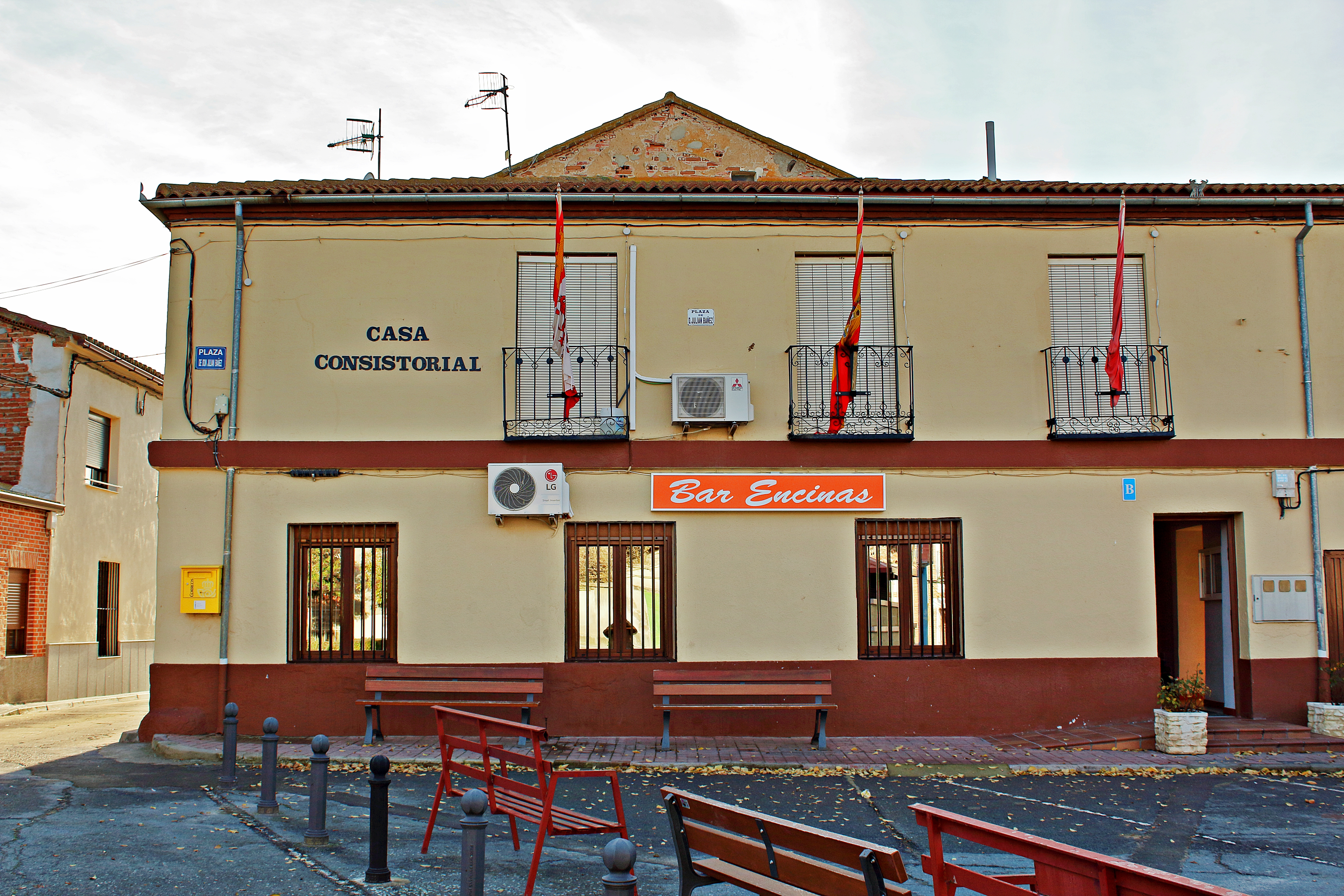
- Town hall of Bernuy-Zapardiel

- Flag Coat of arms

- Extension of the municipal term within the province of Ávila

- Location in Spain. Bernuy-Zapardiel (Spain)
- Coordinates: 40°58′34″N 4°56′38″W
- Country: Spain
- Autonomous community: Castile and León
- Province: Ávila
- Municipality: Bernuy-Zapardiel

Area
  - Total: 19.78 km^{2} (7.64 sq mi)
- Elevation: 855 m (2,805 ft)

Population (2025-01-01)
  - Total: 79
  - Density: 4.0/km^{2} (10/sq mi)
- Time zone: UTC+1 (CET)
  - Summer (DST): UTC+2 (CEST)
- Website: Official website

Bernuy-Zapardiel is a municipality in the province of Ávila, Castile and León, Spain. According to the 2025 census (INE), the municipality had a population of 79 inhabitants.

== Population ==
Historical population
Year	Pop.	±% p.a.
2023	88	—
2024	84	−4.55%
2025	79	−5.95%
Source: INE
