= Villota del Páramo =

Coordinates: 42°33′N 4°51′W

- municipality
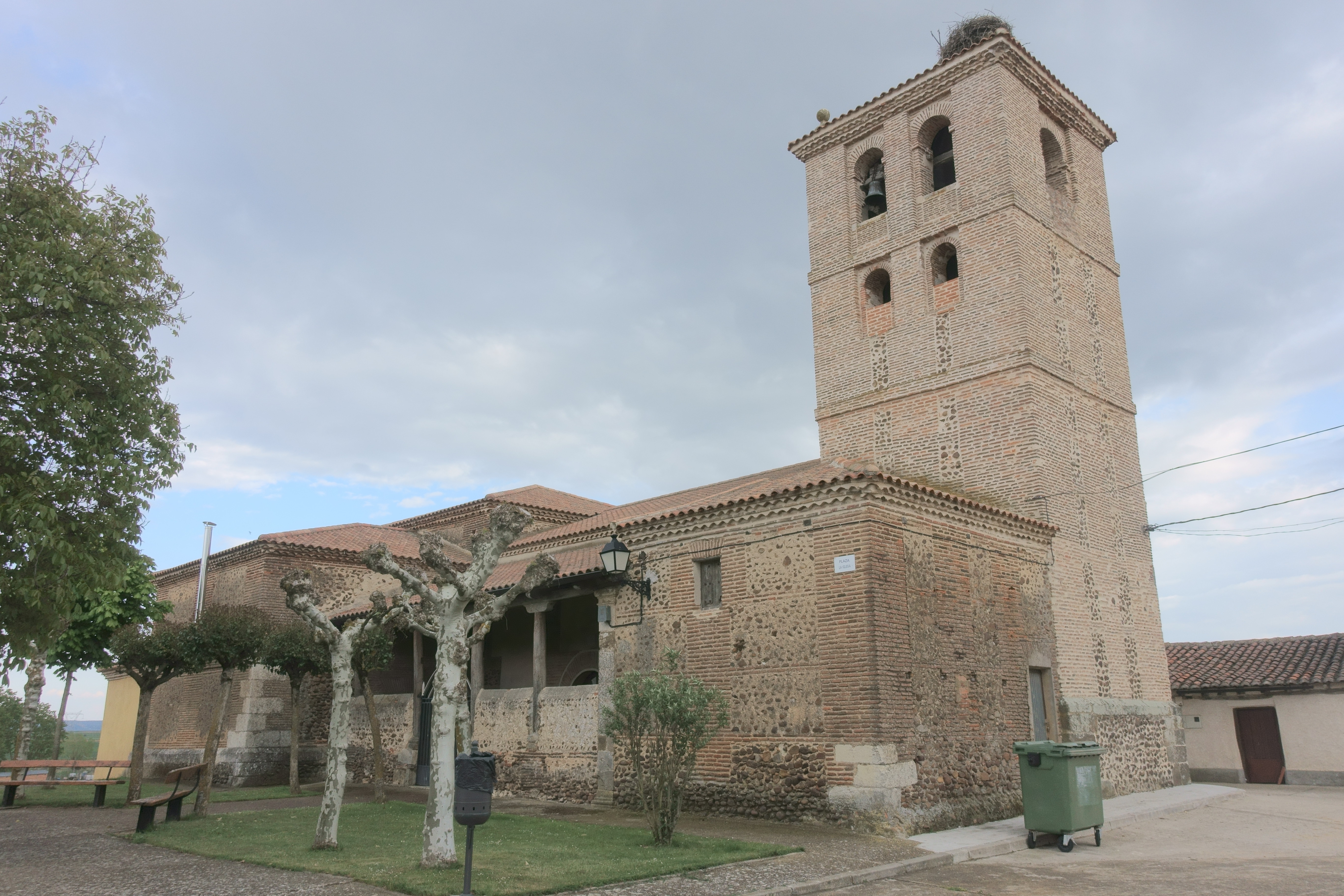

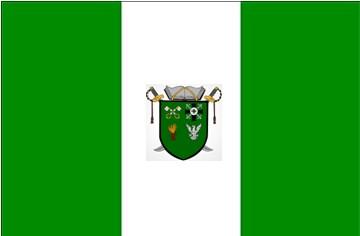
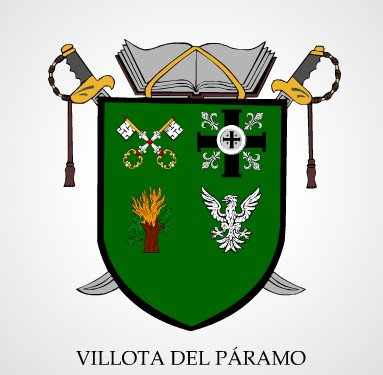
- Flag Coat of arms
- Interactive map of Villota del Páramo
- Country: Spain
- Autonomous community: Castile and León
- Province: Palencia
- Municipality: Villota del Páramo

Area
  - Total: 77.96 km^{2} (30.10 sq mi)
- Elevation: 969 m (3,179 ft)

Population (2025-01-01)
  - Total: 295
  - Density: 3.78/km^{2} (9.80/sq mi)
- Time zone: UTC+1 (CET)
  - Summer (DST): UTC+2 (CEST)
- Website: Official website

Villota del Páramo is a municipality located in the province of Palencia, Castile and León, Spain. According to the 2022 census (INE), the municipality has a population of 307 inhabitants.
