= Brahojos de Medina =

Coordinates: 41°14′N 5°02′W

Brahojos de Medina, Spain
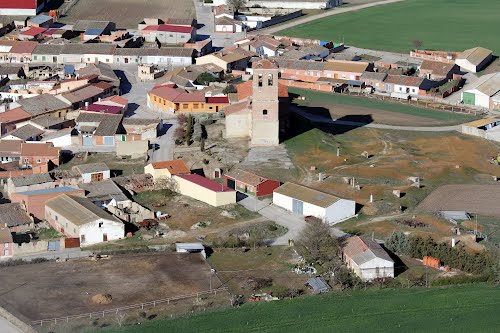
- Aerial view of Brahojos de Medina
- Interactive map of Brahojos de Medina, Spain
- Country: Spain
- Autonomous community: Castile and León
- Province: Valladolid
- Municipality: Brahojos de Medina

Area
  - Total: 27 km^{2} (10 sq mi)

Population (2025-01-01)
  - Total: 96
  - Density: 3.6/km^{2} (9.2/sq mi)
- Time zone: UTC+1 (CET)
  - Summer (DST): UTC+2 (CEST)

Brahojos de Medina is a municipality located in the province of Valladolid, Castile and León, Spain. According to the 2004 census (INE), the municipality has a population of 166 inhabitants.
