= León (Cortes of Castile and León constituency) =

Coordinates: 42°40′N 6°00′W

- Cortes of Castile and León; Electoral constituency
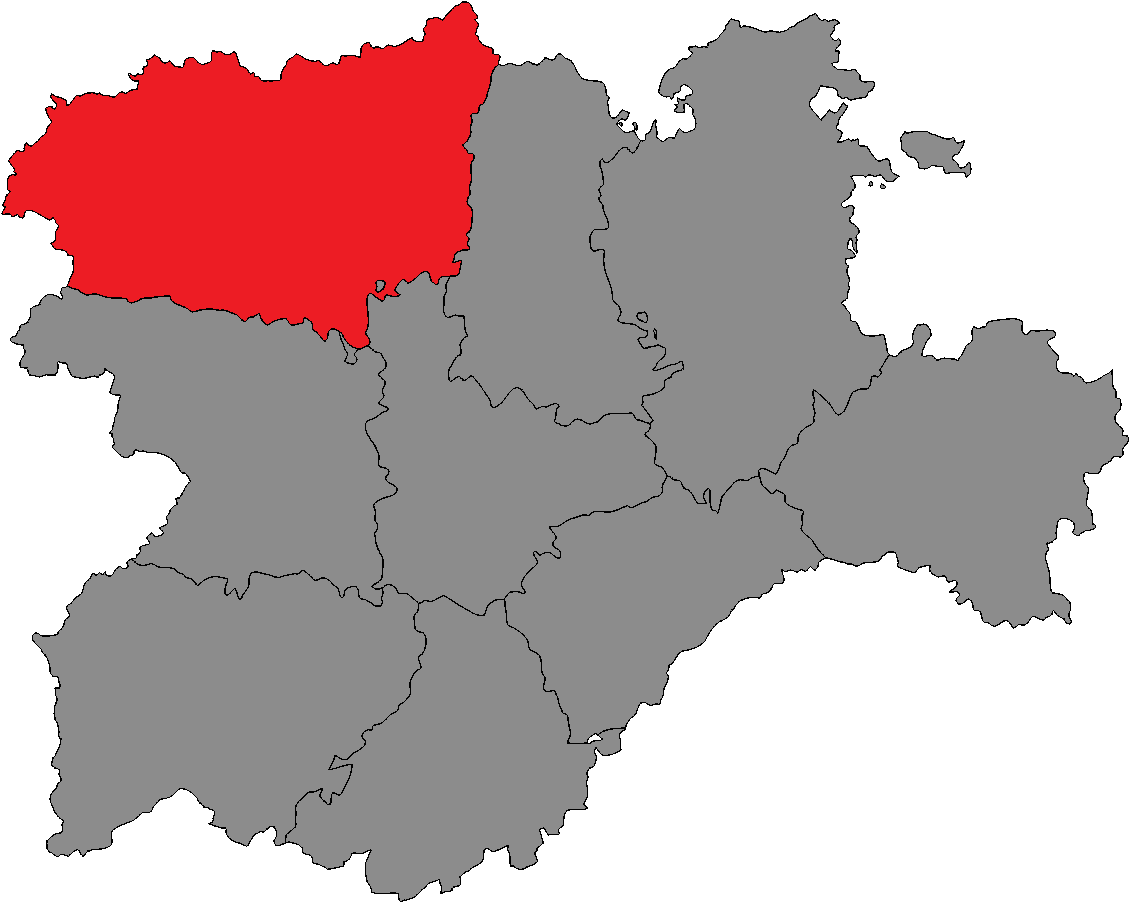
- Location of León within Castile and León
- Province: León
- Autonomous community: Castile and León
- Population: ▲446,771 (2025)
- Electorate: ▼424,287 (2026)
- Major settlements: León, Ponferrada

Current constituency
- Created: 1983
- Seats: 15 (1983–1999); 14 (1999–2019); 13 (2019–present)
- Members: PSOE (4); PP (4); UPL (3); Vox (2)

León is one of the nine constituencies (Spanish: circunscripciones) represented in the Cortes of Castile and León, the regional legislature of the Autonomous Community of Castile and León. The constituency currently elects 14 deputies. Its boundaries correspond to those of the Spanish province of León. The electoral system uses the D'Hondt method and closed-list proportional representation, with a minimum threshold of three percent.

== Electoral system ==
The constituency was created as per the Statute of Autonomy of Castile and León of 1983 and was first contested in the 1983 regional election. The Statute provided for the nine provinces in Castile and León—Ávila, Burgos, León, Palencia, Salamanca, Segovia, Soria, Valladolid and Zamora—to be established as multi-member districts in the Cortes of Castile and León, with this regulation being maintained under the 1987 regional electoral law. Each constituency is entitled to an initial minimum of three seats, with one additional member per each 45,000 inhabitants or fraction greater than 22,500.

Voting is on the basis of universal suffrage, which comprises all nationals over eighteen, registered in Castile and León and in full enjoyment of their political rights. Amendments to the electoral law in 2011 required for Castilian-Leonese people abroad to apply for voting before being permitted to vote, a system known as "begged" or expat vote (Spanish: Voto rogado) which was abolished in 2022. Seats are elected using the D'Hondt method and a closed list proportional representation, with an electoral threshold of three percent of valid votes—which includes blank ballots—being applied in each constituency. The use of the D'Hondt method might result in a higher effective threshold, depending on the district magnitude.

The electoral law allows for parties and federations registered in the interior ministry, coalitions and groupings of electors to present lists of candidates. Parties and federations intending to form a coalition ahead of an election are required to inform the relevant Electoral Commission within ten days of the election call—fifteen before 1985—whereas groupings of electors need to secure the signature of at least one percent of the electorate in the constituencies for which they seek election—one-thousandth of the electorate, with a compulsory minimum of 500 signatures, until 1985—disallowing electors from signing for more than one list of candidates.

== Procurators ==
Procurators 1983–present
Key to parties IU Podemos PSOE UPL CDS Cs PP CP AP Vox
Cortes	Election	Distribution
1st	1983	9 / 6
2nd	1987	7 / 2 / 6
3rd	1991	7 / 1 / 7
4th	1995	1 / 5 / 2 / 7
5th	1999	5 / 3 / 6
6th	2003	6 / 2 / 6
7th	2007	6 / 2 / 6
8th	2011	5 / 1 / 8
9th	2015	2 / 5 / 1 / 1 / 5
10th	2019	1 / 6 / 1 / 1 / 4
11th	2022	4 / 3 / 4 / 2
12th	2026	4 / 3 / 4 / 2

== Regional elections ==
=== 2026 ===
Summary of the 15 March 2026 Cortes of Castile and León election results in León
Parties and alliances	Popular vote			Seats	
Parties and alliances	Votes	%	±pp	Total	+/−
Spanish Socialist Workers' Party (PSOE)	66,742	28.37	–0.09	4	±0
People's Party (PP)	65,991	28.05	+3.08	4	±0
Leonese People's Union (UPL)	48,931	20.80	–0.50	3	±0
Vox (Vox)	38,785	16.49	+1.10	2	±0
United Left, Unite Movement, Greens Equo: In Common (IU–MS–VQ)^{1}	3,057	1.30	n/a	0	±0
The Party is Over (SALF)	2,650	1.13	New	0	±0
Coalition for El Bierzo (CBierzo)	1,992	0.85	–0.27	0	±0
We Can–Green Alliance CyL 2026 (Podemos–AV)^{1}	1,702	0.72	n/a	0	±0
Animalist Party with the Environment (PACMA)^{2}	805	0.34	–0.13	0	±0
Blank Seats to Leave Empty Seats (EB)	520	0.22	New	0	±0
Communist Party of the Workers of Spain (PCTE)	410	0.17	+0.04	0	±0
Forward Proyect (PAlantre)	391	0.17	New	0	±0
Citizens–Party of the Citizenry (Cs)	319	0.14	–2.06	0	±0
Regionalist Party of the Leonese Country (PREPAL)	254	0.11	–0.05	0	±0
Nine Castile and León (NueveCyL)	233	0.10	New	0	±0
Castilian Party–Commoners' Land (PCAS–TC)	48	0.02	–0.03	0	±0
Blank ballots	2,432	1.03	+0.29		
Total	235,262			13	±0
Valid votes	235,262	99.01	–0.16		
Invalid votes	2,363	0.99	+0.16		
Votes cast / turnout	237,625	56.01	+2.51		
Abstentions	186,666	43.99	–2.51		
Registered voters	424,291				
Sources
Footnotes: ^{1} Within the United We Can Castile and León alliance in the 2022 election.; ^{2} Animalist Party with the Environment results are compared to Animalist Party Against Mistreatment of Animals totals in the 2022 election.

=== 2022 ===
Summary of the 13 February 2022 Cortes of Castile and León election results in León
Parties and alliances	Popular vote			Seats	
Parties and alliances	Votes	%	±pp	Total	+/−
Spanish Socialist Workers' Party (PSOE)	64,342	28.46	–6.79	4	–2
People's Party (PP)	56,462	24.97	–2.38	4	±0
Leonese People's Union (UPL)	48,144	21.30	+11.10	3	+2
Vox (Vox)	34,789	15.39	+11.17	2	+2
United We Can Castile and León (Podemos–IU–AV)^{1}	11,329	5.01	–2.17	0	–1
Citizens–Party of the Citizenry (Cs)	4,973	2.20	–8.78	0	–1
Coalition for El Bierzo–El Bierzo Exists (CBierzo–BEX)	2,521	1.12	–0.30	0	±0
Animalist Party Against Mistreatment of Animals (PACMA)	1,063	0.47	–0.12	0	±0
Regionalist Party of the Leonese Country (PREPAL)	373	0.16	–0.05	0	±0
Communist Party of the Workers of Spain (PCTE)	298	0.13	+0.02	0	±0
Castilian Party–Commoners' Land–Zero Cuts (PCAS–TC–RC)	110	0.05	New	0	±0
Blank ballots	1,675	0.74	–0.34		
Total	226,079			13	±0
Valid votes	226,079	99.17	+0.13		
Invalid votes	1,884	0.83	–0.13		
Votes cast / turnout	227,963	53.50	–7.52		
Abstentions	198,145	46.50	+7.52		
Registered voters	426,108				
Sources
Footnotes: ^{1} United We Can Castile and León results are compared to the combined totals of We Can–Equo and United Left–Anticapitalists in the 2019 election.

=== 2019 ===
Summary of the 26 May 2019 Cortes of Castile and León election results in León
Parties and alliances	Popular vote			Seats	
Parties and alliances	Votes	%	±pp	Total	+/−
Spanish Socialist Workers' Party (PSOE)	92,282	35.25	+7.91	6	+1
People's Party (PP)	71,607	27.35	–4.79	4	–1
Citizens–Party of the Citizenry (Cs)	28,755	10.98	+2.08	1	±0
Leonese People's Union (UPL)^{1}	26,705	10.20	+2.47	1	±0
We Can–Equo (Podemos–Equo)	14,469	5.53	–7.08	1	–1
Vox (Vox)	11,052	4.22	+4.82	0	±0
United Left–Anticapitalists (IU–Anticapitalistas–PCAS/TC–ALTER)^{2}	4,320	1.65	–1.80	0	±0
Coalition for El Bierzo (CB)	3,725	1.42	–0.49	0	±0
Regionalist Party of El Bierzo (PRB)	1,602	0.61	+0.33	0	±0
Animalist Party Against Mistreatment of Animals (PACMA)	1,543	0.59	–0.08	0	±0
Social Unity of Bierzo Electors (USE Bierzo)	1,259	0.48	New	0	±0
Regionalist Party of the Leonese Country (PREPAL)	549	0.21	+0.03	0	±0
Grouped Rural Citizens (CRA)	472	0.18	–0.46	0	±0
Communist Party of the Workers of Spain (PCTE)	291	0.11	New	0	±0
With You, We Are Democracy (Contigo)	149	0.06	New	0	±0
Regionalist Union of Castile and León (Unión Regionalista)^{3}	141	0.05	+0.01	0	±0
Democratic Centre Coalition (CCD)	65	0.02	New	0	±0
Blank ballots	2,828	1.08	–1.48		
Total	261,814			13	–1
Valid votes	261,814	99.04	+1.11		
Invalid votes	2,547	0.96	–1.11		
Votes cast / turnout	264,361	61.02	+0.38		
Abstentions	168,889	38.98	–0.38		
Registered voters	433,250				
Sources
Footnotes: ^{1} Leonese People's Union results are compared to the combined totals of Leonese People's Union and Leonese Autonomist Party–Leonesist Unity in the 2015 election.; ^{2} United Left–Anticapitalists results are compared to the combined totals of United Left–Equo: Convergence for Castile and León and Castilian Party–Commoners' Land: Pact in the 2015 election.; ^{3} Regionalist Union of Castile and León results are compared to Regionalist Democracy of Castile and León totals in the 2015 election.

=== 2015 ===
Summary of the 24 May 2015 Cortes of Castile and León election results in León
Parties and alliances	Popular vote			Seats	
Parties and alliances	Votes	%	±pp	Total	+/−
People's Party (PP)	84,752	32.14	–12.57	5	–3
Spanish Socialist Workers' Party (PSOE)	72,110	27.34	–4.48	5	±0
We Can (Podemos)	33,254	12.61	New	2	+2
Citizens–Party of the Citizenry (C's)	23,461	8.90	New	1	+1
Leonese People's Union (UPL)	18,431	6.99	–0.45	1	±0
United Left–Equo: Convergence for Castile and León (IU–Equo)	9,027	3.42	–0.38	0	±0
Coalition for El Bierzo (CB)^{1}	5,032	1.91	+1.06	0	±0
Leonese Autonomist Party–Leonesist Unity (PAL–UL)	1,963	0.74	–0.65	0	±0
Union, Progress and Democracy (UPyD)	1,899	0.72	–0.95	0	±0
Animalist Party Against Mistreatment of Animals (PACMA)	1,772	0.67	+0.31	0	±0
Grouped Rural Citizens (CRA)	1,698	0.64	New	0	±0
Vox (Vox)	1,205	0.46	New	0	±0
Regionalist Party of El Bierzo (PRB)	732	0.28	+0.05	0	±0
Communist Party of the Peoples of Spain (PCPE)	535	0.20	+0.04	0	±0
Regionalist Party of the Leonese Country (PREPAL)	471	0.18	–0.11	0	±0
National Democracy (DN)	450	0.17	New	0	±0
Regionalist Democracy of Castile and León (DRCyL)	97	0.04	New	0	±0
Castilian Party–Commoners' Land: Pact (PCAS–TC–Pacto)	78	0.03	–0.02	0	±0
Blank ballots	6,762	2.56	–0.67		
Total	263,729			14	±0
Valid votes	263,729	97.93	–0.08		
Invalid votes	5,563	2.07	+0.08		
Votes cast / turnout	269,292	60.64	–3.88		
Abstentions	174,797	39.36	+3.88		
Registered voters	444,089				
Sources
Footnotes: ^{1} Coalition for El Bierzo results are compared to Party of El Bierzo totals in the 2011 election.

=== 2011 ===
Summary of the 22 May 2011 Cortes of Castile and León election results in León
Parties and alliances	Popular vote			Seats	
Parties and alliances	Votes	%	±pp	Total	+/−
People's Party (PP)	126,483	44.71	+5.12	8	+2
Spanish Socialist Workers' Party (PSOE)	90,014	31.82	–7.85	5	–1
Leonese People's Union (UPL)	25,212	8.91	–4.46	1	–1
United Left of Castile and León (IUCyL)	10,754	3.80	+1.70	0	±0
Social Alternative Movement (MASS)	4,777	1.69	New	0	±0
Union, Progress and Democracy (UPyD)	4,719	1.67	New	0	±0
Leonese Autonomist Party–Leonesist Unity (PAL–UL)	3,925	1.39	–0.24	0	±0
Party of El Bierzo (PB)	2,401	0.85	+0.38	0	±0
Civiqus (Civiqus)	1,527	0.54	New	0	±0
Anti-Bullfighting Party Against Mistreatment of Animals (PACMA)	1,018	0.36	New	0	±0
Independents for San Andrés (IxSA)	859	0.30	New	0	±0
Regionalist Party of the Leonese Country (PREPAL)	812	0.29	+0.13	0	±0
Regionalist Party of El Bierzo (PRB)	657	0.23	–0.11	0	±0
Communist Party of the Castilian People (PCPC)	460	0.16	New	0	±0
Party of Castile and León (PCAL)	150	0.05	New	0	±0
Blank ballots	9,147	3.23	+1.51		
Total	282,915			14	±0
Valid votes	282,915	98.01	–1.31		
Invalid votes	5,755	1.99	+1.31		
Votes cast / turnout	288,670	64.52	–4.00		
Abstentions	158,734	35.48	+4.00		
Registered voters	447,404				

=== 2007 ===
Summary of the 27 May 2007 Cortes of Castile and León election results in León
Parties and alliances	Popular vote			Seats	
Parties and alliances	Votes	%	±pp	Total	+/−
Spanish Socialist Workers' Party (PSOE)	120,988	39.67	+3.69	6	±0
People's Party (PP)	120,749	39.59	+0.73	6	±0
Leonese People's Union (UPL)	40,781	13.37	–4.44	2	±0
United Left–The Greens–Commitment for Castile and León (IU–LV–CyL)	6,395	2.10	–0.98	0	±0
Leonese Autonomist Party–Leonesist Unity (PAL–UL)	4,972	1.63	New	0	±0
The Greens of Europe (LVE)	1,861	0.61	New	0	±0
Party of El Bierzo–Alternative for Castile and León (PB–ACAL)	1,427	0.47	–0.25	0	±0
Regionalist Party of El Bierzo (PRB)	1,028	0.34	+0.01	0	±0
Republican Left (IR)	485	0.16	+0.04	0	±0
Regionalist Party of the Leonese Country (PREPAL)	473	0.16	+0.04	0	±0
The Phalanx (FE)	294	0.10	±0.00	0	±0
Spanish Phalanx of the CNSO (FE de las JONS)	271	0.09	New	0	±0
Blank ballots	5,237	1.72	+0.12		
Total	304,961			14	±0
Valid votes	304,961	99.32	–0.07		
Invalid votes	2,095	0.68	+0.07		
Votes cast / turnout	307,056	68.52	–2.36		
Abstentions	141,055	31.48	+2.36		
Registered voters	448,111				

=== 2003 ===
Summary of the 25 May 2003 Cortes of Castile and León election results in León
Parties and alliances	Popular vote			Seats	
Parties and alliances	Votes	%	±pp	Total	+/−
People's Party (PP)	123,043	38.86	–3.66	6	±0
Spanish Socialist Workers' Party (PSOE)	113,906	35.98	+4.98	6	+1
Leonese People's Union (UPL)	56,389	17.81	–0.63	2	–1
United Left of Castile and León (IUCyL)	9,767	3.08	–0.90	0	±0
Party of El Bierzo (PB)	2,286	0.72	–0.59	0	±0
Leonese United Independent Citizens (CiuLe)	2,051	0.65	New	0	±0
The Greens (LV)	1,835	0.58	New	0	±0
Regionalist Party of El Bierzo (PRB)	1,041	0.33	New	0	±0
Leonese People for León–PREPAL (PREPAL)	394	0.12	–0.07	0	±0
Republican Left (IR)	386	0.12	New	0	±0
The Phalanx (FE)	321	0.10	New	0	±0
Commoners' Land–Castilian Nationalist Party (TC–PNC)	122	0.04	–0.01	0	±0
Blank ballots	5,064	1.60	–0.36		
Total	316,605			14	±0
Valid votes	316,605	99.39	+0.13		
Invalid votes	1,928	0.61	–0.13		
Votes cast / turnout	318,533	70.88	+5.13		
Abstentions	130,865	29.12	–5.13		
Registered voters	449,398				

=== 1999 ===
Summary of the 13 June 1999 Cortes of Castile and León election results in León
Parties and alliances	Popular vote			Seats	
Parties and alliances	Votes	%	±pp	Total	+/−
People's Party (PP)	124,877	42.52	–2.58	6	–1
Spanish Socialist Workers' Party (PSOE)	91,058	31.00	+0.60	5	±0
Leonese People's Union (UPL)	54,158	18.44	+5.72	3	+1
United Left of Castile and León (IUCyL)	11,693	3.98	–2.75	0	–1
Party of El Bierzo (PB)	3,851	1.31	–0.18	0	±0
Centrist Union–Democratic and Social Centre (UC–CDS)	836	0.28	New	0	±0
Salamanca–Zamora–León–PREPAL (PREPAL)	558	0.19	+0.03	0	±0
Spanish Democratic Party (PADE)	432	0.15	New	0	±0
Spanish Phalanx of the CNSO (FE–JONS)	331	0.11	New	0	±0
Commoners' Land–Castilian Nationalist Party (TC–PNC)	157	0.05	–0.02	0	±0
Blank ballots	5,770	1.96	+0.43		
Total	293,721			14	–1
Valid votes	293,721	99.26	–0.01		
Invalid votes	2,191	0.74	+0.01		
Votes cast / turnout	295,912	65.75	–6.72		
Abstentions	154,134	34.25	+6.72		
Registered voters	450,046				

=== 1995 ===
Summary of the 28 May 1995 Cortes of Castile and León election results in León
Parties and alliances	Popular vote			Seats	
Parties and alliances	Votes	%	±pp	Total	+/−
People's Party (PP)	139,810	45.10	+5.27	7	±0
Spanish Socialist Workers' Party (PSOE)	94,238	30.40	–8.46	5	–2
Leonese People's Union (UPL)	39,425	12.72	+8.54	2	+2
United Left of Castile and León (IU)	20,864	6.73	+1.84	1	+1
Party of El Bierzo (PB)	4,617	1.49	–0.14	0	±0
Independents for León (IPL)	3,290	1.06	New	0	±0
The Alternative Greens (LVA)	1,374	0.44	New	0	±0
Provincialist Party of El Bierzo (PPB)	909	0.29	New	0	±0
Leonese People for León–PREPAL (PREPAL)	484	0.16	New	0	±0
Commoners' Land–Castilian Nationalist Party (TC–PNC)	209	0.07	New	0	±0
Democratic and Social Centre (CDS)	n/a	n/a	–5.46	0	–1
Blank ballots	4,747	1.53	–0.39		
Total	309,967			15	±0
Valid votes	309,967	99.27	+0.20		
Invalid votes	2,281	0.73	–0.20		
Votes cast / turnout	312,248	72.47	+7.24		
Abstentions	118,642	27.53	–7.24		
Registered voters	430,980				

=== 1991 ===
Summary of the 26 May 1991 Cortes of Castile and León election results in León
Parties and alliances	Popular vote			Seats	
Parties and alliances	Votes	%	±pp	Total	+/−
People's Party (PP)^{1}	108,883	39.83	+3.59	7	+1
Spanish Socialist Workers' Party (PSOE)	106,225	38.86	+0.67	7	±0
Democratic and Social Centre (CDS)	14,915	5.46	–8.29	1	–1
United Left (IU)	13,369	4.89	+0.99	0	±0
Leonese People's Union (UPL)	11,432	4.18	+1.54	0	±0
Party of El Bierzo (PB)	4,465	1.63	–0.28	0	±0
Bercian Left (IB)	3,407	1.25	New	0	±0
The Greens (LV)	3,303	1.21	New	0	±0
Independent Progressive Union (UPI)	2,127	0.78	New	0	±0
Blank ballots	5,257	1.92	+0.22		
Total	273,383			15	±0
Valid votes	273,383	99.07	+0.51		
Invalid votes	2,554	0.93	–0.51		
Votes cast / turnout	275,937	65.23	–4.38		
Abstentions	147,085	34.77	+4.38		
Registered voters	423,022				
Sources
Footnotes: ^{1} People's Party results are compared to the combined totals of People's Alliance, People's Democratic Party and Liberal Party in the 1987 election.

=== 1987 ===
Summary of the 10 June 1987 Cortes of Castile and León election results in León
Parties and alliances	Popular vote			Seats	
Parties and alliances	Votes	%	±pp	Total	+/−
Spanish Socialist Workers' Party (PSOE)	107,791	38.19	–9.54	7	–2
People's Alliance (AP)^{1}	95,351	33.79	n/a	6	+1
Democratic and Social Centre (CDS)	38,794	13.75	+11.39	2	+2
United Left (IU)^{2}	11,009	3.90	+0.54	0	±0
Leonesist Union (UNLE)	7,443	2.64	New	0	±0
Party of El Bierzo (PB)	5,387	1.91	+0.26	0	±0
People's Democratic Party (PDP)^{1}	4,725	1.67	n/a	0	–1
Liberal Party (PL)^{1}	2,213	0.78	n/a	0	±0
Regionalist Party of the Leonese Country (PREPAL)	2,078	0.74	–3.49	0	±0
Workers' Party of Spain–Communist Unity (PTE–UC)	1,475	0.52	New	0	±0
Humanist Platform (PH)	640	0.23	New	0	±0
Spanish Phalanx of the CNSO (FE–JONS)	510	0.18	New	0	±0
Blank ballots	4,799	1.70	+0.52		
Total	282,215			15	±0
Valid votes	282,215	98.56	–0.15		
Invalid votes	4,109	1.44	+0.15		
Votes cast / turnout	286,324	69.61	+4.88		
Abstentions	125,028	30.39	–4.88		
Registered voters	411,352				
Sources
Footnotes: ^{1} Within the People's Coalition alliance in the 1983 election.; ^{2} United Left results are compared to Communist Party of Spain totals in the 1983 election.

=== 1983 ===
Summary of the 8 May 1983 Cortes of Castile and León election results in León
Parties and alliances	Popular vote			Seats	
Parties and alliances	Votes	%	±pp	Total	+/−
Spanish Socialist Workers' Party (PSOE)	124,750	47.73	n/a	9	n/a
People's Coalition (AP–PDP–UL)	91,990	35.20	n/a	6	n/a
Liberal Democratic Party (PDL)	11,219	4.29	n/a	0	n/a
Agrarian Bloc–Regionalist Party of the Leonese Country (BAR–PREPAL)	11,048	4.23	n/a	0	n/a
Communist Party of Castile and León (PCCL–PCE)	8,777	3.36	n/a	0	n/a
Democratic and Social Centre (CDS)	6,177	2.36	n/a	0	n/a
Party of El Bierzo (PB)	4,301	1.65	n/a	0	n/a
Blank ballots	3,095	1.18	n/a		
Total	261,357			15	n/a
Valid votes	261,357	98.71	n/a		
Invalid votes	3,424	1.29	n/a		
Votes cast / turnout	264,781	64.73	n/a		
Abstentions	144,243	35.27	n/a		
Registered voters	409,024				
