= Segovia (Cortes of Castile and León constituency) =

Coordinates: 41°10′N 4°00′W

- Cortes of Castile and León; Electoral constituency
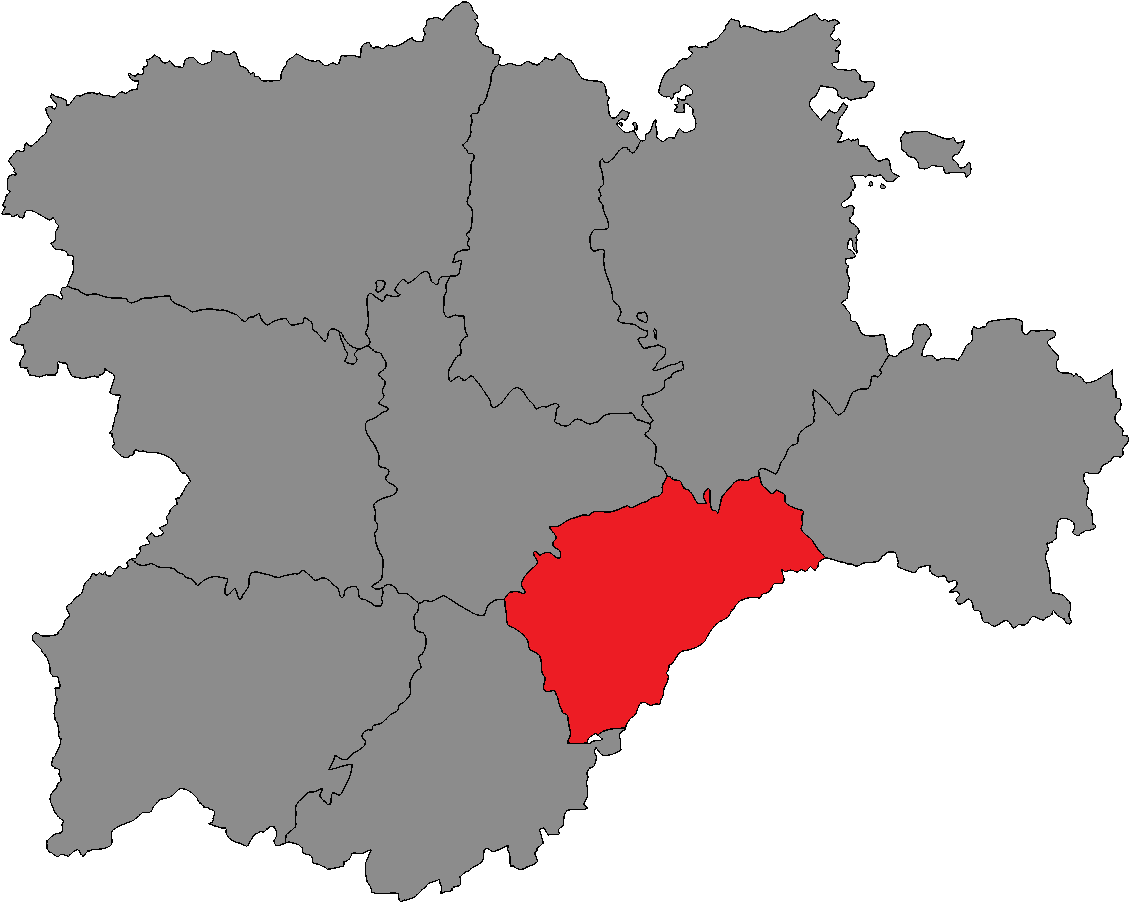
- Location of Segovia within Castile and León
- Province: Segovia
- Autonomous community: Castile and León
- Population: ▲158,470 (2025)
- Electorate: ▲120,825 (2026)
- Major settlements: Segovia

Current constituency
- Created: 1983
- Seats: 6 (1983–2011); 7 (2011–2019); 6 (2019–2026); 7 (2026–present)
- Members: PP (3); PSOE (3); Vox (1)

Segovia is one of the nine constituencies (Spanish: circunscripciones) represented in the Cortes of Castile and León, the regional legislature of the Autonomous Community of Castile and León. The constituency currently elects seven deputies. Its boundaries correspond to those of the Spanish province of Segovia. The electoral system uses the D'Hondt method and closed-list proportional representation, with a minimum threshold of three percent.

== Electoral system ==
The constituency was created as per the Statute of Autonomy of Castile and León of 1983 and was first contested in the 1983 regional election. The Statute provided for the nine provinces in Castile and León—Ávila, Burgos, León, Palencia, Salamanca, Segovia, Soria, Valladolid and Zamora—to be established as multi-member districts in the Cortes of Castile and León, with this regulation being maintained under the 1987 regional electoral law. Each constituency is entitled to an initial minimum of three seats, with one additional member per each 45,000 inhabitants or fraction greater than 22,500.

Voting is on the basis of universal suffrage, which comprises all nationals over eighteen, registered in Castile and León and in full enjoyment of their political rights. Amendments to the electoral law in 2011 required for Castilian-Leonese people abroad to apply for voting before being permitted to vote, a system known as "begged" or expat vote (Spanish: Voto rogado) which was abolished in 2022. Seats are elected using the D'Hondt method and a closed list proportional representation, with an electoral threshold of three percent of valid votes—which includes blank ballots—being applied in each constituency. The use of the D'Hondt method might result in a higher effective threshold, depending on the district magnitude.

The electoral law allows for parties and federations registered in the interior ministry, coalitions and groupings of electors to present lists of candidates. Parties and federations intending to form a coalition ahead of an election are required to inform the relevant Electoral Commission within ten days of the election call—fifteen before 1985—whereas groupings of electors need to secure the signature of at least one percent of the electorate in the constituencies for which they seek election—one-thousandth of the electorate, with a compulsory minimum of 500 signatures, until 1985—disallowing electors from signing for more than one list of candidates.

== Procurators ==
Procurators 1983–present
Key to parties Podemos PSOE CDS Cs PDP PP CP AP Vox
Cortes	Election	Distribution
1st	1983	3 / 3
2nd	1987	2 / 2 / 1 / 1
3rd	1991	2 / 4
4th	1995	2 / 4
5th	1999	2 / 4
6th	2003	2 / 4
7th	2007	2 / 4
8th	2011	2 / 5
9th	2015	1 / 2 / 4
10th	2019	3 / 1 / 2
11th	2022	2 / 3 / 1
12th	2026	3 / 3 / 1

== Regional elections ==
=== 2026 ===
Summary of the 15 March 2026 Cortes of Castile and León election results in Segovia
Parties and alliances	Popular vote			Seats	
Parties and alliances	Votes	%	±pp	Total	+/−
People's Party (PP)	29,856	39.16	+4.47	3	±0
Spanish Socialist Workers' Party (PSOE)	23,849	31.28	–0.15	3	+1
Vox (Vox)	14,781	19.39	–0.06	1	±0
United Left, Unite Movement, Greens Equo: In Common (IU–MS–VQ)^{1}	2,233	2.93	n/a	0	±0
The Party is Over (SALF)	1,191	1.56	New	0	±0
Nine Castile and León (NueveCyL)	845	1.11	New	0	±0
We Can–Green Alliance CyL 2026 (Podemos–AV)^{1}	681	0.89	n/a	0	±0
Castilian Party–Commoners' Land (PCAS–TC)	462	0.61	–0.23	0	±0
Blank Seats to Leave Empty Seats (EB)	455	0.60	New	0	±0
Animalist Party with the Environment (PACMA)^{2}	370	0.49	–0.21	0	±0
For a Fairer World (M+J)	201	0.26	New	0	±0
Blank ballots	1,323	1.74	+0.43		
Total	76,247			7	+1
Valid votes	76,247	98.22	–0.05		
Invalid votes	1,380	1.78	+0.05		
Votes cast / turnout	77,627	64.25	+1.10		
Abstentions	43,201	35.75	–1.10		
Registered voters	120,828				
Sources
Footnotes: ^{1} Within the United We Can Castile and León alliance in the 2022 election.; ^{2} Animalist Party with the Environment results are compared to Animalist Party Against Mistreatment of Animals totals in the 2022 election.

=== 2022 ===
Summary of the 13 February 2022 Cortes of Castile and León election results in Segovia
Parties and alliances	Popular vote			Seats	
Parties and alliances	Votes	%	±pp	Total	+/−
People's Party (PP)	25,779	34.69	+1.18	3	+1
Spanish Socialist Workers' Party (PSOE)	23,362	31.43	–2.36	2	–1
Vox (Vox)	14,456	19.45	+13.88	1	+1
United We Can Castile and León (Podemos–IU–AV)^{1}	4,479	6.03	–1.62	0	±0
Citizens–Party of the Citizenry (Cs)	3,616	4.87	–11.49	0	–1
Castilian Party–Commoners' Land–Zero Cuts (PCAS–TC–RC)	628	0.84	New	0	±0
Animalist Party Against Mistreatment of Animals (PACMA)	517	0.70	+0.01	0	±0
Centered (centrados)	511	0.69	–0.38	0	±0
Blank ballots	974	1.31	+0.23		
Total	74,322			6	±0
Valid votes	74,322	98.27	–0.51		
Invalid votes	1,309	1.73	+0.51		
Votes cast / turnout	75,631	63.15	–9.55		
Abstentions	44,131	36.85	+9.55		
Registered voters	119,762				
Sources
Footnotes: ^{1} United We Can Castile and León results are compared to the combined totals of We Can–Equo and United Left–Anticapitalists in the 2019 election.

=== 2019 ===
Summary of the 26 May 2019 Cortes of Castile and León election results in Segovia
Parties and alliances	Popular vote			Seats	
Parties and alliances	Votes	%	±pp	Total	+/−
Spanish Socialist Workers' Party (PSOE)	29,056	33.79	+6.31	3	+1
People's Party (PP)	28,822	33.51	–6.50	2	–2
Citizens–Party of the Citizenry (Cs)	14,068	16.36	+7.29	1	+1
Vox (Vox)	4,790	5.57	+4.85	0	±0
We Can–Equo (Podemos–Equo)	4,564	5.31	–5.95	0	–1
United Left–Anticapitalists (IU–Anticapitalistas–PCAS/TC–ALTER)^{1}	2,011	2.34	–1.96	0	±0
Centered (centrados)	920	1.07	New	0	±0
Animalist Party Against Mistreatment of Animals (PACMA)	596	0.69	–0.07	0	±0
For a Fairer World (PUM+J)	148	0.17	New	0	±0
Spanish Phalanx of the CNSO (FE de las JONS)	94	0.11	–0.23	0	±0
Blank ballots	929	1.08	–1.29		
Total	85,998			6	–1
Valid votes	85,998	98.78	+1.30		
Invalid votes	1,060	1.22	–1.30		
Votes cast / turnout	87,058	72.70	+1.99		
Abstentions	32,699	27.30	–1.99		
Registered voters	119,757				
Sources
Footnotes: ^{1} United Left–Anticapitalists results are compared to the combined totals of United Left–Equo: Convergence for Castile and León and Castilian Party–Commoners' Land: Pact in the 2015 election.

=== 2015 ===
Summary of the 24 May 2015 Cortes of Castile and León election results in Segovia
Parties and alliances	Popular vote			Seats	
Parties and alliances	Votes	%	±pp	Total	+/−
People's Party (PP)	33,632	40.01	–14.25	4	–1
Spanish Socialist Workers' Party (PSOE)	23,097	27.48	–4.07	2	±0
We Can (Podemos)	9,467	11.26	New	1	+1
Citizens–Party of the Citizenry (C's)	7,626	9.07	New	0	±0
United Left–Equo: Convergence for Castile and León (IU–Equo)	3,005	3.58	–0.75	0	±0
Union, Progress and Democracy (UPyD)	2,220	2.64	–1.09	0	±0
Spanish Democratic Segovian Party (PSeDE)	874	1.04	New	0	±0
Animalist Party Against Mistreatment of Animals (PACMA)	637	0.76	+0.25	0	±0
Castilian Party–Commoners' Land: Pact (PCAS–TC–Pacto)	606	0.72	New	0	±0
Vox (Vox)	606	0.72	New	0	±0
Spanish Phalanx of the CNSO (FE de las JONS)	288	0.34	New	0	±0
Blank ballots	1,995	2.37	–0.68		
Total	84,053			7	±0
Valid votes	84,053	97.48	–0.38		
Invalid votes	2,177	2.52	+0.38		
Votes cast / turnout	86,230	70.71	–3.84		
Abstentions	35,725	29.29	+3.84		
Registered voters	121,955				

=== 2011 ===
Summary of the 22 May 2011 Cortes of Castile and León election results in Segovia
Parties and alliances	Popular vote			Seats	
Parties and alliances	Votes	%	±pp	Total	+/−
People's Party (PP)	48,886	54.26	+1.32	5	+1
Spanish Socialist Workers' Party (PSOE)	28,425	31.55	–5.93	2	±0
United Left of Castile and León (IUCyL)	3,899	4.33	+1.21	0	±0
Union, Progress and Democracy (UPyD)	3,361	3.73	New	0	±0
Greens and Castilians (LV–PCAL)^{1}	1,553	1.72	–0.97	0	±0
Left Segovia (SdI)	760	0.84	New	0	±0
Anti-Bullfighting Party Against Mistreatment of Animals (PACMA)	463	0.51	New	0	±0
Blank ballots	2,752	3.05	+0.94		
Total	90,099			7	+1
Valid votes	90,099	97.86	–1.09		
Invalid votes	1,971	2.14	+1.09		
Votes cast / turnout	92,070	74.55	–1.46		
Abstentions	31,436	25.45	+1.46		
Registered voters	123,506				
Sources
Footnotes: ^{1} Greens and Castilians results are compared to the combined totals of The Greens and Commoners' Land–Alternative for Castile and León in the 2007 election.

=== 2007 ===
Summary of the 27 May 2007 Cortes of Castile and León election results in Segovia
Parties and alliances	Popular vote			Seats	
Parties and alliances	Votes	%	±pp	Total	+/−
People's Party (PP)	49,525	52.94	+2.17	4	±0
Spanish Socialist Workers' Party (PSOE)	35,067	37.48	+1.07	2	±0
United Left–The Greens–Commitment for Castile and León (IU–LV–CyL)	2,923	3.12	–0.72	0	±0
The Greens (LV)	1,524	1.63	New	0	±0
Independent Segovian Alternative (ASí)	1,214	1.30	–0.10	0	±0
Commoners' Land–Alternative for Castile and León (TC–ACAL)	992	1.06	–0.01	0	±0
Republican Left (IR)	331	0.35	+0.17	0	±0
Blank ballots	1,975	2.11	–0.32		
Total	93,551			6	±0
Valid votes	93,551	98.95	+0.08		
Invalid votes	997	1.05	–0.08		
Votes cast / turnout	94,548	76.01	–0.23		
Abstentions	29,842	23.99	+0.23		
Registered voters	124,390				

=== 2003 ===
Summary of the 25 May 2003 Cortes of Castile and León election results in Segovia
Parties and alliances	Popular vote			Seats	
Parties and alliances	Votes	%	±pp	Total	+/−
People's Party (PP)	47,636	50.77	–2.95	4	±0
Spanish Socialist Workers' Party (PSOE)	34,157	36.41	+4.33	2	±0
United Left of Castile and León (IUCyL)	3,601	3.84	–1.92	0	±0
The Greens–Green Group (LV–GV)	2,196	2.34	+0.77	0	±0
Independent Segovian Alternative (ASí)	1,314	1.40	New	0	±0
Democratic and Social Centre (CDS)	1,034	1.10	–0.44	0	±0
Commoners' Land–Castilian Nationalist Party (TC–PNC)	1,001	1.07	+0.50	0	±0
Castilian Left (IzCa)	304	0.32	New	0	±0
Republican Left (IR)	170	0.18	New	0	±0
Humanist Party (PH)	125	0.13	New	0	±0
Blank ballots	2,281	2.43	–0.87		
Total	93,819			6	±0
Valid votes	93,819	98.87	+0.02		
Invalid votes	1,070	1.13	–0.02		
Votes cast / turnout	94,889	76.24	+5.68		
Abstentions	29,568	23.76	–5.68		
Registered voters	124,457				

=== 1999 ===
Summary of the 13 June 1999 Cortes of Castile and León election results in Segovia
Parties and alliances	Popular vote			Seats	
Parties and alliances	Votes	%	±pp	Total	+/−
People's Party (PP)	47,391	53.72	–2.99	4	±0
Spanish Socialist Workers' Party (PSOE)	28,302	32.08	+5.61	2	±0
United Left of Castile and León (IUCyL)	5,082	5.76	–4.79	0	±0
The Greens–Green Group (LV–GV)	1,383	1.57	+0.01	0	±0
Centrist Union–Democratic and Social Centre (UC–CDS)	1,356	1.54	New	0	±0
Spanish Democratic Party (PADE)	576	0.65	New	0	±0
Commoners' Land–Castilian Nationalist Party (TC–PNC)	503	0.57	+0.04	0	±0
Nationalist Party of Castile and León (PANCAL)	276	0.31	New	0	±0
Regionalist Unity of Castile and León (URCL)	230	0.26	New	0	±0
Spanish Phalanx of the CNSO (FE–JONS)	203	0.23	–0.02	0	±0
Blank ballots	2,913	3.30	+1.10		
Total	88,215			6	±0
Valid votes	88,215	98.85	–0.06		
Invalid votes	1,030	1.15	+0.06		
Votes cast / turnout	89,245	70.56	–4.72		
Abstentions	37,240	29.44	+4.72		
Registered voters	126,485				

=== 1995 ===
Summary of the 28 May 1995 Cortes of Castile and León election results in Segovia
Parties and alliances	Popular vote			Seats	
Parties and alliances	Votes	%	±pp	Total	+/−
People's Party (PP)	51,842	56.71	+10.66	4	±0
Spanish Socialist Workers' Party (PSOE)	24,195	26.47	–5.93	2	±0
United Left of Castile and León (IU)	9,644	10.55	+4.73	0	±0
Platform of Independents of Spain (PIE)	1,430	1.56	New	0	±0
The Greens–Green Group (LV–GV)	1,423	1.56	New	0	±0
Commoners' Land–Castilian Nationalist Party (TC–PNC)	482	0.53	New	0	±0
Spanish Phalanx of the CNSO (FE–JONS)	230	0.25	New	0	±0
Party of El Bierzo (PB)	161	0.18	New	0	±0
Blank ballots	2,014	2.20	+0.23		
Total	91,421			6	±0
Valid votes	91,421	98.91	+0.11		
Invalid votes	1,010	1.09	–0.11		
Votes cast / turnout	92,431	75.28	+4.87		
Abstentions	30,352	24.72	–4.87		
Registered voters	122,783				

=== 1991 ===
Summary of the 26 May 1991 Cortes of Castile and León election results in Segovia
Parties and alliances	Popular vote			Seats	
Parties and alliances	Votes	%	±pp	Total	+/−
People's Party (PP)^{1}	38,663	46.05	+5.90	4	+2
Spanish Socialist Workers' Party (PSOE)	27,199	32.40	+5.62	2	±0
Democratic and Social Centre (CDS)	9,204	10.96	–11.62	0	–2
United Left (IU)	4,888	5.82	–1.24	0	±0
The Greens (LV)	1,457	1.74	New	0	±0
Castilian Regionalist Party (PREC)	679	0.81	New	0	±0
Castilianist Union (UC)	211	0.25	New	0	±0
Blank ballots	1,657	1.97	–0.17		
Total	83,958			6	±0
Valid votes	83,958	98.80	+0.27		
Invalid votes	1,023	1.20	–0.27		
Votes cast / turnout	84,981	70.41	–4.41		
Abstentions	35,714	29.59	+4.41		
Registered voters	120,695				
Sources
Footnotes: ^{1} People's Party results are compared to the combined totals of People's Alliance and People's Democratic Party in the 1987 election.

=== 1987 ===
Summary of the 10 June 1987 Cortes of Castile and León election results in Segovia
Parties and alliances	Popular vote			Seats	
Parties and alliances	Votes	%	±pp	Total	+/−
Spanish Socialist Workers' Party (PSOE)	23,165	26.78	–12.98	2	–1
Democratic and Social Centre (CDS)	19,532	22.58	+16.86	2	+2
People's Alliance (AP)^{1}	19,418	22.45	n/a	1	–1
People's Democratic Party (PDP)^{1}	15,310	17.70	n/a	1	±0
United Left (IU)^{2}	6,104	7.06	+4.60	0	±0
Workers' Party of Spain–Communist Unity (PTE–UC)	402	0.46	New	0	±0
Nationalist Party of Castile and León (PNCL–PANCAL)^{1}	326	0.38	n/a	0	±0
Humanist Platform (PH)	259	0.30	New	0	±0
Leonesist Union (UNLE)	134	0.15	New	0	±0
Blank ballots	1,852	2.14	+0.59		
Total	86,502			6	±0
Valid votes	86,502	98.53	+0.20		
Invalid votes	1,287	1.47	–0.20		
Votes cast / turnout	87,789	74.82	–0.23		
Abstentions	29,549	25.18	+0.23		
Registered voters	117,338				
Sources
Footnotes: ^{1} Within the People's Coalition alliance in the 1983 election.; ^{2} United Left results are compared to Communist Party of Spain totals in the 1983 election.

=== 1983 ===
Summary of the 8 May 1983 Cortes of Castile and León election results in Segovia
Parties and alliances	Popular vote			Seats	
Parties and alliances	Votes	%	±pp	Total	+/−
People's Coalition (AP–PDP–UL)	38,893	45.79	n/a	3	n/a
Spanish Socialist Workers' Party (PSOE)	33,772	39.76	n/a	3	n/a
Democratic and Social Centre (CDS)	4,862	5.72	n/a	0	n/a
Liberal Democratic Party (PDL)	4,019	4.73	n/a	0	n/a
Communist Party of Castile and León (PCCL–PCE)	2,087	2.46	n/a	0	n/a
Blank ballots	1,314	1.55	n/a		
Total	84,947			6	n/a
Valid votes	84,947	98.33	n/a		
Invalid votes	1,447	1.67	n/a		
Votes cast / turnout	86,394	75.05	n/a		
Abstentions	28,728	24.95	n/a		
Registered voters	115,122				
