= Palencia (Cortes of Castile and León constituency) =

Coordinates: 42°25′N 4°30′W

- Cortes of Castile and León; Electoral constituency
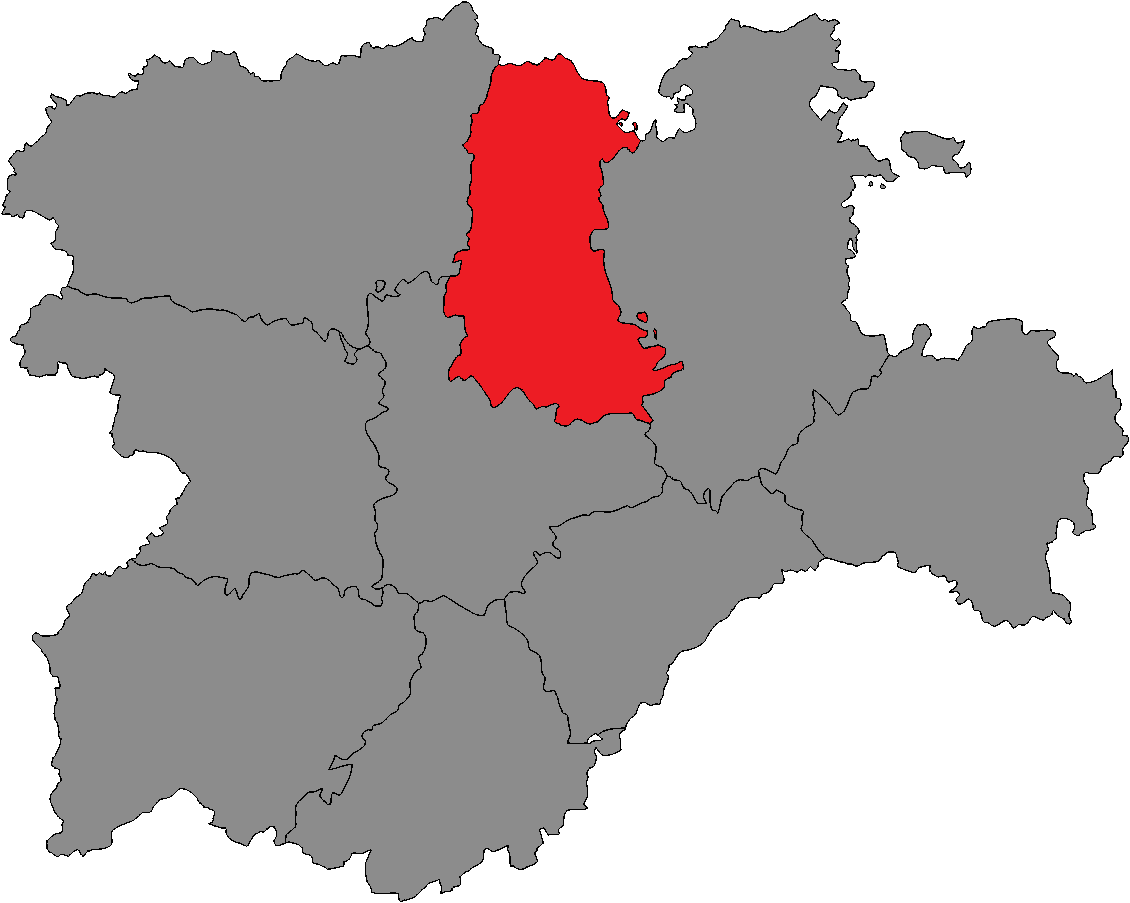
- Location of Palencia within Castile and León
- Province: Palencia
- Autonomous community: Castile and León
- Population: ▲158,687 (2025)
- Electorate: ▼137,353 (2026)
- Major settlements: Palencia

Current constituency
- Created: 1983
- Seats: 7
- Members: PP (3); PSOE (3); Vox (1)

Palencia is one of the nine constituencies (Spanish: circunscripciones) represented in the Cortes of Castile and León, the regional legislature of the Autonomous Community of Castile and León. The constituency currently elects seven deputies. Its boundaries correspond to those of the Spanish province of Palencia. The electoral system uses the D'Hondt method and closed-list proportional representation, with a minimum threshold of three percent.

== Electoral system ==
The constituency was created as per the Statute of Autonomy of Castile and León of 1983 and was first contested in the 1983 regional election. The Statute provided for the nine provinces in Castile and León—Ávila, Burgos, León, Palencia, Salamanca, Segovia, Soria, Valladolid and Zamora—to be established as multi-member districts in the Cortes of Castile and León, with this regulation being maintained under the 1987 regional electoral law. Each constituency is entitled to an initial minimum of three seats, with one additional member per each 45,000 inhabitants or fraction greater than 22,500.

Voting is on the basis of universal suffrage, which comprises all nationals over eighteen, registered in Castile and León and in full enjoyment of their political rights. Amendments to the electoral law in 2011 required for Castilian-Leonese people abroad to apply for voting before being permitted to vote, a system known as "begged" or expat vote (Spanish: Voto rogado) which was abolished in 2022. Seats are elected using the D'Hondt method and a closed list proportional representation, with an electoral threshold of three percent of valid votes—which includes blank ballots—being applied in each constituency. The use of the D'Hondt method might result in a higher effective threshold, depending on the district magnitude.

The electoral law allows for parties and federations registered in the interior ministry, coalitions and groupings of electors to present lists of candidates. Parties and federations intending to form a coalition ahead of an election are required to inform the relevant Electoral Commission within ten days of the election call—fifteen before 1985—whereas groupings of electors need to secure the signature of at least one percent of the electorate in the constituencies for which they seek election—one-thousandth of the electorate, with a compulsory minimum of 500 signatures, until 1985—disallowing electors from signing for more than one list of candidates.

== Procurators ==
Procurators 1983–present
Key to parties Podemos PSOE CDS Cs PP CP AP Vox
Cortes	Election	Distribution
1st	1983	3 / 4
2nd	1987	2 / 1 / 4
3rd	1991	3 / 4
4th	1995	3 / 4
5th	1999	3 / 4
6th	2003	3 / 4
7th	2007	3 / 4
8th	2011	3 / 4
9th	2015	1 / 2 / 4
10th	2019	3 / 1 / 3
11th	2022	3 / 3 / 1
12th	2026	3 / 3 / 1

== Regional elections ==
=== 2026 ===
Summary of the 15 March 2026 Cortes of Castile and León election results in Palencia
Parties and alliances	Popular vote			Seats	
Parties and alliances	Votes	%	±pp	Total	+/−
People's Party (PP)	30,608	35.58	+2.64	3	±0
Spanish Socialist Workers' Party (PSOE)	29,437	34.22	+0.31	3	±0
Vox (Vox)	17,542	20.39	+2.36	1	±0
United Left, Unite Movement, Greens Equo: In Common (IU–MS–VQ)^{1}	1,708	1.99	n/a	0	±0
Let's Go Palencia (VP)	1,668	1.94	New	0	±0
The Party is Over (SALF)	1,390	1.62	New	0	±0
We Can–Green Alliance CyL 2026 (Podemos–AV)^{1}	510	0.59	n/a	0	±0
Empty Spain (EV)	460	0.53	–2.26	0	±0
Blank Seats to Leave Empty Seats (EB)	337	0.39	New	0	±0
Animalist Party with the Environment (PACMA)^{2}	321	0.37	–0.15	0	±0
Castilian Party–Commoners' Land (PCAS–TC)	198	0.23	–0.03	0	±0
Spanish Phalanx of the CNSO (FE de las JONS)	121	0.14	+0.07	0	±0
Communist Party of the Workers of Spain (PCTE)	114	0.13	+0.01	0	±0
For a Fairer World (M+J)	108	0.13	–0.11	0	±0
Nationalist Party of Castile and León–Citizen Reformist Union (PANCAL–URCI)	67	0.08	New	0	±0
Blank ballots	1,429	1.66	+0.63		
Total	86,018			7	±0
Valid votes	86,018	98.35	–0.44		
Invalid votes	1,442	1.65	+0.44		
Votes cast / turnout	87,460	63.67	+2.07		
Abstentions	49,895	36.33	–2.07		
Registered voters	137,355				
Sources
Footnotes: ^{1} Within the United We Can Castile and León alliance in the 2022 election.; ^{2} Animalist Party with the Environment results are compared to Animalist Party Against Mistreatment of Animals totals in the 2022 election.

=== 2022 ===
Summary of the 13 February 2022 Cortes of Castile and León election results in Palencia
Parties and alliances	Popular vote			Seats	
Parties and alliances	Votes	%	±pp	Total	+/−
Spanish Socialist Workers' Party (PSOE)	28,709	33.91	–1.99	3	±0
People's Party (PP)	27,887	32.94	–1.55	3	±0
Vox (Vox)	15,260	18.03	+12.34	1	+1
Citizens–Party of the Citizenry (Cs)	4,639	5.48	–9.61	0	–1
United We Can Castile and León (Podemos–IU–AV)^{1}	3,669	4.33	–2.35	0	±0
Empty Spain (España Vaciada)	2,363	2.79	New	0	±0
Animalist Party Against Mistreatment of Animals (PACMA)	443	0.52	–0.15	0	±0
Castilian Party–Commoners' Land–Zero Cuts (PCAS–TC–RC)	224	0.26	New	0	±0
For a Fairer World (PUM+J)	200	0.24	New	0	±0
State of Spain Unionist Party (PUEDE)	114	0.14	New	0	±0
Wake Up (Despierta)	113	0.13	New	0	±0
Communist Party of the Workers of Spain (PCTE)	101	0.12	New	0	±0
Spanish Phalanx of the CNSO (FE de las JONS)	61	0.07	–0.09	0	±0
Blank ballots	874	1.03	–0.04		
Total	84,657			7	±0
Valid votes	84,657	98.79	–0.17		
Invalid votes	1,037	1.21	+0.17		
Votes cast / turnout	85,694	61.60	–7.77		
Abstentions	53,416	38.40	+7.77		
Registered voters	139,110				
Sources
Footnotes: ^{1} United We Can Castile and León results are compared to the combined totals of We Can–Equo and United Left–Anticapitalists in the 2019 election.

=== 2019 ===
Summary of the 26 May 2019 Cortes of Castile and León election results in Palencia
Parties and alliances	Popular vote			Seats	
Parties and alliances	Votes	%	±pp	Total	+/−
Spanish Socialist Workers' Party (PSOE)	34,898	35.90	+6.88	3	+1
People's Party (PP)	33,532	34.49	–6.50	3	–1
Citizens–Party of the Citizenry (Cs)	14,669	15.09	+5.17	1	+1
Vox (Vox)	5,531	5.69	New	0	±0
We Can–Equo (Podemos–Equo)	4,456	4.58	–6.26	0	–1
United Left–Anticapitalists (IU–Anticapitalistas–PCAS/TC–ALTER)^{1}	2,040	2.10	–2.43	0	±0
Animalist Party Against Mistreatment of Animals (PACMA)	648	0.67	New	0	±0
Regionalist Union of Castile and León (Unión Regionalista)^{2}	246	0.25	–0.04	0	±0
Spanish Phalanx of the CNSO (FE de las JONS)	153	0.16	–0.23	0	±0
Blank ballots	1,038	1.07	–1.44		
Total	97,211			7	±0
Valid votes	97,211	98.96	+1.13		
Invalid votes	1,025	1.04	–1.13		
Votes cast / turnout	98,236	69.37	+1.72		
Abstentions	43,377	30.63	–1.72		
Registered voters	141,613				
Sources
Footnotes: ^{1} United Left–Anticapitalists results are compared to the combined totals of United Left–Equo: Convergence for Castile and León and Castilian Party–Commoners' Land: Pact in the 2015 election.; ^{2} Regionalist Union of Castile and León results are compared to Regionalist Democracy of Castile and León totals in the 2015 election.

=== 2015 ===
Summary of the 24 May 2015 Cortes of Castile and León election results in Palencia
Parties and alliances	Popular vote			Seats	
Parties and alliances	Votes	%	±pp	Total	+/−
People's Party (PP)	39,387	40.99	–12.05	4	±0
Spanish Socialist Workers' Party (PSOE)	27,881	29.02	–3.76	2	–1
We Can (Podemos)	10,411	10.84	New	1	+1
Citizens–Party of the Citizenry (C's)	9,534	9.92	New	0	±0
United Left–Equo: Convergence for Castile and León (IU–Equo)	3,703	3.85	–0.56	0	±0
Union, Progress and Democracy (UPyD)	1,107	1.15	–1.25	0	±0
Castilian Party–Commoners' Land: Pact (PCAS–TC–Pacto)	650	0.68	–1.95	0	±0
Spanish Phalanx of the CNSO (FE de las JONS)	373	0.39	+0.05	0	±0
Blank Seats (EB)	348	0.36	New	0	±0
Regionalist Democracy of Castile and León (DRCyL)^{1}	276	0.29	–0.05	0	±0
Blank ballots	2,410	2.51	–0.81		
Total	96,080			7	±0
Valid votes	96,080	97.83	–0.20		
Invalid votes	2,127	2.17	+0.20		
Votes cast / turnout	98,207	67.65	–2.48		
Abstentions	46,962	32.35	+2.48		
Registered voters	145,169				
Sources
Footnotes: ^{1} Regionalist Democracy of Castile and León results are compared to Regionalist Unity of Castile and León totals in the 2011 election.

=== 2011 ===
Summary of the 22 May 2011 Cortes of Castile and León election results in Palencia
Parties and alliances	Popular vote			Seats	
Parties and alliances	Votes	%	±pp	Total	+/−
People's Party (PP)	53,939	53.04	+3.80	4	±0
Spanish Socialist Workers' Party (PSOE)	33,336	32.78	–7.46	3	±0
United Left of Castile and León (IUCyL)	4,490	4.41	+1.91	0	±0
Party of Castile and León (PCAL)^{1}	2,675	2.63	+1.02	0	±0
Union, Progress and Democracy (UPyD)	2,436	2.40	New	0	±0
Anti-Bullfighting Party Against Mistreatment of Animals (PACMA)	422	0.41	New	0	±0
Regionalist Unity of Castile and León (URCL)	343	0.34	New	0	±0
Spanish Phalanx of the CNSO (FE de las JONS)	341	0.34	+0.07	0	±0
Communist Party of the Castilian People (PCPC)	206	0.20	–0.01	0	±0
Internationalist Solidarity and Self-Management (SAIn)	142	0.14	New	0	±0
Blank ballots	3,372	3.32	+1.22		
Total	101,702			7	±0
Valid votes	101,702	98.03	–1.09		
Invalid votes	2,047	1.97	+1.09		
Votes cast / turnout	103,749	70.13	–2.85		
Abstentions	44,191	29.87	+2.85		
Registered voters	147,940				
Sources
Footnotes: ^{1} Party of Castile and León results are compared to Commoners' Land–Alternative for Castile and León totals in the 2007 election.

=== 2007 ===
Summary of the 27 May 2007 Cortes of Castile and León election results in Palencia
Parties and alliances	Popular vote			Seats	
Parties and alliances	Votes	%	±pp	Total	+/−
People's Party (PP)	53,672	49.24	+0.61	4	±0
Spanish Socialist Workers' Party (PSOE)	43,864	40.24	–1.32	3	±0
Independent Candidacy–The Party of Castile and León (CI–PCL)	3,065	2.81	New	0	±0
United Left–The Greens–Commitment for Castile and León (IU–LV–CyL)	2,729	2.50	–0.73	0	±0
Commoners' Land–Alternative for Castile and León (TC–ACAL)	1,755	1.61	–0.54	0	±0
The Greens (LV)^{1}	793	0.73	–0.56	0	±0
Spanish Phalanx of the CNSO (FE de las JONS)	292	0.27	New	0	±0
Communist Party of the Castilian People (PCPC)	225	0.21	New	0	±0
Republican Left (IR)	193	0.18	±0.00	0	±0
Humanist Party (PH)	134	0.12	–0.11	0	±0
Blank ballots	2,288	2.10	–0.41		
Total	109,010			7	±0
Valid votes	109,010	99.12	+0.16		
Invalid votes	966	0.88	–0.16		
Votes cast / turnout	109,976	72.98	–2.03		
Abstentions	40,725	27.02	+2.03		
Registered voters	150,701				
Sources
Footnotes: ^{1} The Greens results are compared to The Greens–Cives totals in the 2003 election.

=== 2003 ===
Summary of the 25 May 2003 Cortes of Castile and León election results in Palencia
Parties and alliances	Popular vote			Seats	
Parties and alliances	Votes	%	±pp	Total	+/−
People's Party (PP)	55,214	48.63	–2.39	4	±0
Spanish Socialist Workers' Party (PSOE)	47,188	41.56	+3.82	3	±0
United Left of Castile and León (IUCyL)	3,672	3.23	–2.59	0	±0
Commoners' Land–Castilian Nationalist Party (TC–PNC)	2,439	2.15	+1.23	0	±0
The Greens–Cives (LV–Cives)	1,459	1.29	New	0	±0
Castilian Left (IzCa)	257	0.23	New	0	±0
Humanist Party (PH)	257	0.23	–0.08	0	±0
Republican Left (IR)	208	0.18	New	0	±0
Blank ballots	2,845	2.51	–0.37		
Total	113,539			7	±0
Valid votes	113,539	98.96	+0.28		
Invalid votes	1,192	1.04	–0.28		
Votes cast / turnout	114,731	75.01	+3.81		
Abstentions	38,233	24.99	–3.81		
Registered voters	152,964				

=== 1999 ===
Summary of the 13 June 1999 Cortes of Castile and León election results in Palencia
Parties and alliances	Popular vote			Seats	
Parties and alliances	Votes	%	±pp	Total	+/−
People's Party (PP)	55,451	51.02	–1.27	4	±0
Spanish Socialist Workers' Party (PSOE)	41,022	37.74	+5.82	3	±0
United Left of Castile and León (IUCyL)	6,323	5.82	–2.61	0	±0
Regionalist Unity of Castile and León (URCL)	1,419	1.31	+0.16	0	±0
Commoners' Land–Castilian Nationalist Party (TC–PNC)	996	0.92	+0.39	0	±0
Humanist Party (PH)	338	0.31	New	0	±0
Blank ballots	3,134	2.88	+1.10		
Total	108,683			7	±0
Valid votes	108,683	98.68	–0.39		
Invalid votes	1,458	1.32	+0.39		
Votes cast / turnout	110,141	71.20	–5.24		
Abstentions	44,560	28.80	+5.24		
Registered voters	154,701				

=== 1995 ===
Summary of the 28 May 1995 Cortes of Castile and León election results in Palencia
Parties and alliances	Popular vote			Seats	
Parties and alliances	Votes	%	±pp	Total	+/−
People's Party (PP)	60,111	52.29	+7.03	4	±0
Spanish Socialist Workers' Party (PSOE)	36,688	31.92	–5.24	3	±0
United Left of Castile and León (IU)	9,692	8.43	+3.10	0	±0
People's Palentine Group (APP)	4,071	3.54	New	0	±0
Regionalist Unity of Castile and León (URCL)^{1}	1,321	1.15	–0.66	0	±0
Commoners' Land–Castilian Nationalist Party (TC–PNC)	609	0.53	New	0	±0
Communist Party of the Peoples of Spain (PCPE)	236	0.21	–0.12	0	±0
Party of El Bierzo (PB)	183	0.16	New	0	±0
Blank ballots	2,041	1.78	+0.11		
Total	114,952			7	±0
Valid votes	114,952	99.07	+0.14		
Invalid votes	1,083	0.93	–0.14		
Votes cast / turnout	116,035	76.44	+5.27		
Abstentions	35,763	23.56	–5.27		
Registered voters	151,798				
Sources
Footnotes: ^{1} Regionalist Unity of Castile and León results are compared to the combined totals of Palentine Unity and Regionalist Democracy of Castile and León in the 1991 election.

=== 1991 ===
Summary of the 26 May 1991 Cortes of Castile and León election results in Palencia
Parties and alliances	Popular vote			Seats	
Parties and alliances	Votes	%	±pp	Total	+/−
People's Party (PP)^{1}	47,767	45.26	+0.22	4	±0
Spanish Socialist Workers' Party (PSOE)	39,211	37.16	+3.78	3	+1
Democratic and Social Centre (CDS)	7,088	6.72	–6.97	0	–1
United Left (IU)	5,629	5.33	+1.04	0	±0
Palentine Unity (UP)	1,558	1.48	New	0	±0
The Greens (LV)	1,522	1.44	New	0	±0
Communist Party of the Peoples of Spain (PCPE)	353	0.33	New	0	±0
Regionalist Democracy of Castile and León (DRCL)	344	0.33	New	0	±0
Castilianist Union (UC)	298	0.28	New	0	±0
Blank ballots	1,759	1.67	+0.23		
Total	105,529			7	±0
Valid votes	105,529	98.93	+0.33		
Invalid votes	1,142	1.07	–0.33		
Votes cast / turnout	106,671	71.17	–6.81		
Abstentions	43,215	28.83	+6.81		
Registered voters	149,886				
Sources
Footnotes: ^{1} People's Party results are compared to People's Alliance totals in the 1987 election.

=== 1987 ===
Summary of the 10 June 1987 Cortes of Castile and León election results in Palencia
Parties and alliances	Popular vote			Seats	
Parties and alliances	Votes	%	±pp	Total	+/−
People's Alliance (AP)^{1}	49,144	45.04	n/a	4	+1
Spanish Socialist Workers' Party (PSOE)	36,420	33.38	–7.65	2	–1
Democratic and Social Centre (CDS)	14,940	13.69	+8.81	1	+1
United Left (IU)^{2}	4,679	4.29	–0.24	0	±0
Nationalist Party of Castile and León (PNCL–PANCAL)^{1}	1,102	1.01	New	0	±0
Workers' Party of Spain–Communist Unity (PTE–UC)	777	0.71	New	0	±0
Humanist Platform (PH)	296	0.27	New	0	±0
Leonesist Union (UNLE)	184	0.17	New	0	±0
People's Democratic Party (PDP)^{1}	n/a	n/a	n/a	0	–1
Blank ballots	1,574	1.44	+0.63		
Total	109,116			7	±0
Valid votes	109,116	98.60	–0.17		
Invalid votes	1,549	1.40	+0.17		
Votes cast / turnout	110,665	77.98	+4.35		
Abstentions	31,255	22.02	–4.35		
Registered voters	141,920				
Sources
Footnotes: ^{1} Within the People's Coalition alliance in the 1983 election.; ^{2} United Left results are compared to Communist Party of Spain totals in the 1983 election.

=== 1983 ===
Summary of the 8 May 1983 Cortes of Castile and León election results in Palencia
Parties and alliances	Popular vote			Seats	
Parties and alliances	Votes	%	±pp	Total	+/−
People's Coalition (AP–PDP–UL)	48,753	46.88	n/a	4	n/a
Spanish Socialist Workers' Party (PSOE)	42,665	41.03	n/a	3	n/a
Democratic and Social Centre (CDS)	5,072	4.88	n/a	0	n/a
Communist Party of Castile and León (PCCL–PCE)	4,707	4.53	n/a	0	n/a
Castilian Communal Unity (UCC)	1,958	1.88	n/a	0	n/a
Blank ballots	839	0.81	n/a		
Total	103,994			7	n/a
Valid votes	103,994	98.77	n/a		
Invalid votes	1,296	1.23	n/a		
Votes cast / turnout	105,290	73.63	n/a		
Abstentions	37,702	26.37	n/a		
Registered voters	142,992				
