= 2007 Castilian-Leonese regional election =

Election in the Spanish region of Castile and León

- 27 May 2007

All 83 seats in the Cortes of Castile and León 42 seats needed for a majority
- Opinion polls
- Registered: 2,171,192 ▼0.3%
- Turnout: 1,535,096 (70.7%) ▼2.0 pp
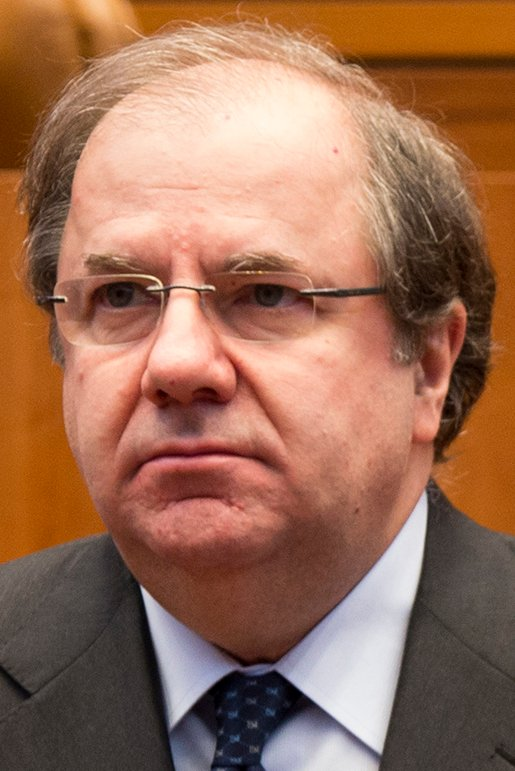

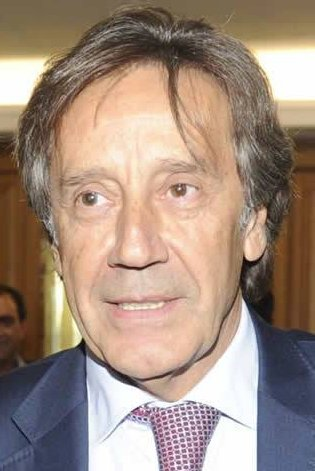

	First party	Second party	Third party
Leader	Juan Vicente Herrera	Ángel Villalba	Joaquín Otero
Party	PP	PSOE	UPL–ZU
Leader since	16 March 2001	22 October 2000	13 September 1997
Leader's seat	Burgos	León	León
Last election	48 seats, 48.5%	32 seats, 36.8%	2 seats, 4.0% (Note: Results for UPL (3.8%, 2 seats) and ZU (0.2%, 0 seats) in the 2003 election.)
Seats won	48	33	2
Seat change	0	▲1	0
Popular vote	748,746	574,596	41,519
Percentage	49.2%	37.7%	2.7%
Swing	▲0.7 pp	▲0.9 pp	▼1.3 pp
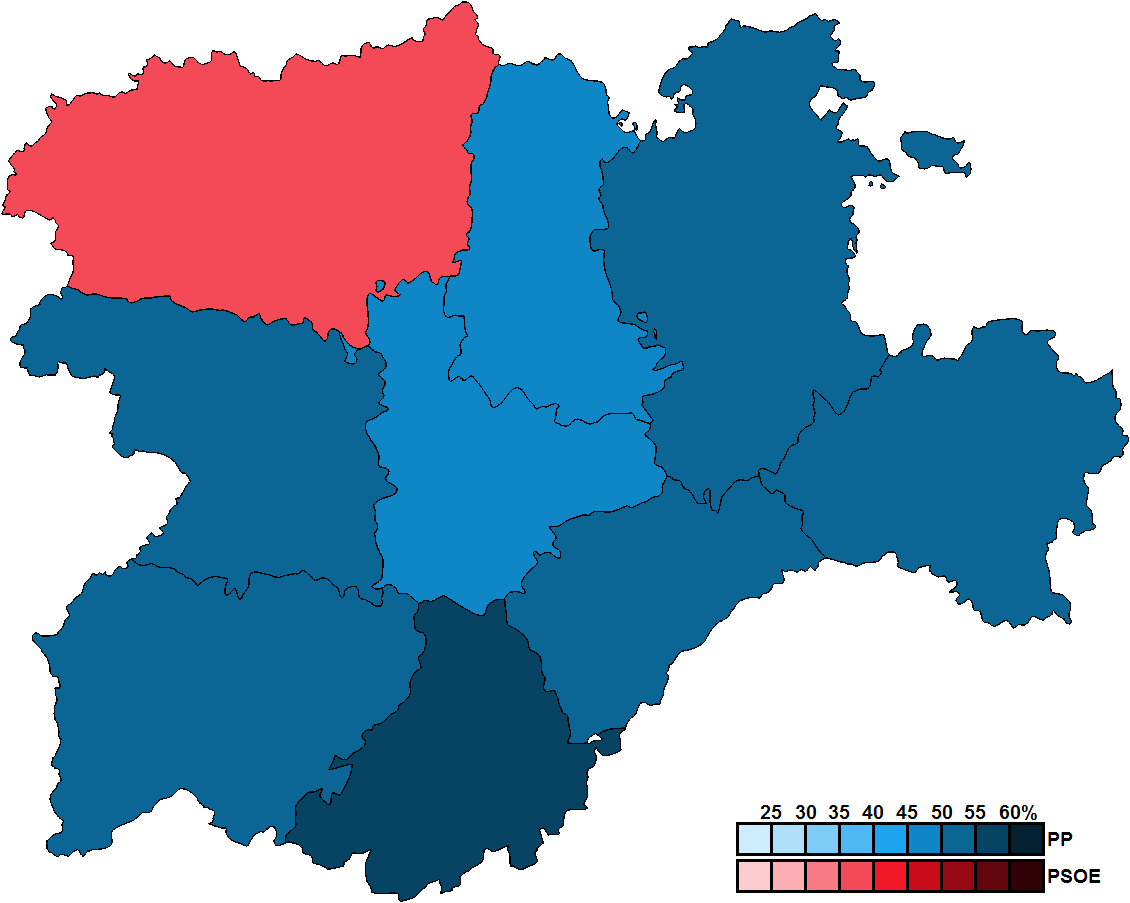
- Constituency results map for the Cortes of Castile and León
President before election
Juan Vicente Herrera
PP
President after election
Juan Vicente Herrera
PP

A regional election was held in Castile and León on 27 May 2007 to elect the 7th Cortes of the autonomous community. All 83 seats in the Cortes were up for election. It was held concurrently with regional elections in twelve other autonomous communities and local elections all throughout Spain.

== Overview ==
Under the 1999 Statute of Autonomy, the Cortes of Castile and León was the unicameral legislature of the homonymous autonomous community, having legislative power in devolved matters, as well as the ability to grant or withdraw confidence from a regional president. The electoral and procedural rules were supplemented by national law provisions.

=== Date ===
The term of the Cortes of Castile and León expired four years after the date of its previous ordinary election, with election day being fixed for the fourth Sunday of May every four years. The election decree was required to be issued no later than 25 days before the scheduled expiration date of parliament and published on the following day in the Official Gazette of Castile and León (BOCYL). The previous election was held on 25 May 2003, setting the date for election day on the fourth Sunday of May four years later, which was 27 May 2007.

The regional president had the prerogative to dissolve the Cortes of Castile and León at any given time and call a snap election, provided that no motion of no confidence was in process, no nationwide election had been called and that dissolution did not occur either during the first legislative session or during the last year of parliament before its planned expiration, nor before one year after a previous one. In the event of an investiture process failing to elect a regional president within a two-month period from the first ballot, the Cortes were to be automatically dissolved and a fresh election called, except if it happened in the final year before the expiry of the legislative term. Any snap election held as a result of these circumstances would not alter the period to the next ordinary election, with elected lawmakers serving the remainder of its original four-year term.

The election to the Cortes of Castile and León was officially called on 3 April 2007 with the publication of the corresponding decree in the BOCYL, setting election day for 27 May and scheduling for the chamber to reconvene on 19 June.

=== Electoral system ===
Voting for the Cortes was based on universal suffrage, comprising all Spanish nationals over 18 years of age, registered in Castile and León and with full political rights, provided that they had not been deprived of the right to vote by a final sentence, nor were legally incapacitated.

The Cortes of Castile and León had three seats per each multi-member constituency—corresponding to the provinces of Ávila, Burgos, León, Palencia, Salamanca, Segovia, Soria, Valladolid and Zamora—plus one additional seat per 45,000 inhabitants or fraction above 22,500. All were elected using the D'Hondt method and closed-list proportional voting, with a three percent-threshold of valid votes (including blank ballots) in each constituency. The use of this electoral method resulted in a higher effective threshold depending on district magnitude and vote distribution.

As a result of the aforementioned allocation, each Cortes constituency was entitled the following seats:

Seats	Constituencies
15	Valladolid^{(+1)}
14	León
11	Burgos, Salamanca
7	Ávila, Palencia, Zamora
6	Segovia
5	Soria

The law did not provide for by-elections to fill vacant seats; instead, any vacancies arising after the proclamation of candidates and during the legislative term were filled by the next candidates on the party lists or, when required, by designated substitutes.

=== Outgoing parliament ===
The table below shows the composition of the parliamentary groups in the chamber at the time of the election call.

Parliamentary composition in April 2007
Groups	Parties	Legislators	
Groups	Parties	Seats	Total
People's Parliamentary Group	PP	48	48
Socialist Parliamentary Group	PSOE	32	32
Mixed Parliamentary Group	UPL	2	2

== Parties and candidates ==
The electoral law allowed for parties and federations registered in the interior ministry, alliances and groupings of electors to present lists of candidates. Parties and federations intending to form an alliance were required to inform the relevant electoral commission within 10 days of the election call, whereas groupings of electors needed to secure the signature of at least one percent of the electorate in the constituencies for which they sought election, disallowing electors from signing for more than one list. Amendments earlier in 2007 required a balanced composition of men and women in the electoral lists, so that candidates of either sex made up at least 40 percent of the total composition.

Below is a list of the main parties and alliances which contested the election:

Candidacy	Parties and alliances	Leading candidate	Ideology	Previous result		Gov.	Ref.
Candidacy	Parties and alliances	Leading candidate	Ideology	Vote %	Seats	Gov.	Ref.
PP	List: People's Party (PP)	Juan Vicente Herrera	Conservatism; Christian democracy	48.5%	48	Yes	
PSOE	List: Spanish Socialist Workers' Party (PSOE)	Ángel Villalba	Social democracy	36.8%	32	No	
UPL–ZU	List: Leonese People's Union (UPL); United Zamora (ZU)	Joaquín Otero	Leonesism; Regionalism; Autonomism	4.0%	2	No	
IU–LV–CyL	List: United Left of Castile and León (IUCyL) – Communist Party of Castile and León (PCCyL) – Revolutionary Workers' Party (POR)	José María González	Socialism; Communism	3.4%	0	No	

== Opinion polls ==
The tables below list opinion polling results in reverse chronological order, showing the most recent first and using the dates when the survey fieldwork was done, as opposed to the date of publication. Where the fieldwork dates are unknown, the date of publication is given instead. The highest percentage figure in each polling survey is displayed with its background shaded in the leading party's colour. If a tie ensues, this is applied to the figures with the highest percentages. The "Lead" column on the right shows the percentage-point difference between the parties with the highest percentages in a poll.

=== Voting intention estimates ===
The table below lists weighted voting intention estimates. Refusals are generally excluded from the party vote percentages, while question wording and the treatment of "don't know" responses and those not intending to vote may vary between polling organisations. When available, seat projections determined by the polling organisations are displayed below (or in place of) the percentages in a smaller font; 42 seats were required for an absolute majority in the Cortes of Castile and León.

Color key:

Exit poll

Polling firm/Commissioner	Fieldwork date	Sample size	Turnout	PP	PSOE	UPL	IUCyL	CI	Lead
2007 regional election	27 May 2007	—N/a	70.7	49.2; 48	37.7; 33	2.7; 2	3.1; 0	1.1; 0	11.5
Ipsos/RTVE–FORTA	27 May 2007	?	?	? 44/47	? 34/37	? 1/2	? 0/1	? 0/1	?
Celeste-Tel/Terra	9–15 May 2007	?	?	47.8; 47/48	36.8; 32/33	4.1; 2/3	4.0; 1	–	11.0
Telecyl/El Norte de Castilla	7–11 May 2007	1,800	70.4	48.8; 47/50	36.9; 32/35	2.1; 1	3.9; 1	–	11.9
Sigma Dos/El Mundo	27 Apr–8 May 2007	1,600	?	49.0; 43/48	40.4; 34/38	1.7; 1	3.8; 0/1	–	8.6
CIS	9 Apr–6 May 2007	2,991	?	48.1; 47	36.5; 32	3.9; 3	3.9; 1	–	11.6
Sigma Dos/El Mundo	16–24 Nov 2006	?	?	49.1; 43/45	40.6; 35/37	3.2; 2	4.2; 0	–	8.5
Telecyl/El Norte de Castilla (Note: Undecided and/or abstentionists excluded.)	23–30 Oct 2006	874	70.4	47.9	34.8	3.7	3.3	–	13.1
Telecyl/El Norte de Castilla	11–20 May 2006	820	74.0	45.7	35.9	1.1	3.1	–	9.8
2004 EP election	13 Jun 2004	—N/a	52.3	53.1 (49)	41.6 (33)	–	2.4 (0)	–	11.5
2004 general election	14 Mar 2004	—N/a	77.8	50.3 (45)	41.9 (37)	0.8 (0)	2.8 (0)	0.1 (0)	8.4
2003 regional election	25 May 2003	—N/a	72.7	48.5; 48	36.8; 32	3.8; 2	3.4; 0	0.7; 0	11.7

=== Voting preferences ===
The table below lists raw, unweighted voting preferences.

Polling firm/Commissioner	Fieldwork date	Sample size	PP	PSOE	UPL	IUCyL	Question	X mark	Lead
2007 regional election (Note: Does not include non-resident citizens.)	27 May 2007	—N/a	35.6	27.0	2.0	2.2	—N/a	28.6	8.6
CIS	9 Apr–6 May 2007	2,991	31.1	23.2	1.2	2.3	31.6	6.5	7.9
2004 EP election	13 Jun 2004	—N/a	28.5	22.0	–	1.3	—N/a	46.5	6.5
2004 general election	14 Mar 2004	—N/a	40.0	33.3	0.7	2.2	—N/a	20.0	6.7
2003 regional election	25 May 2003	—N/a	36.0	27.2	2.9	2.5	—N/a	25.3	8.8

=== Victory preferences ===
The table below lists opinion polling on the victory preferences for each party in the event of a regional election taking place.

Polling firm/Commissioner	Fieldwork date	Sample size	PP	PSOE	UPL	IUCyL	Other/ None	Question	Lead
CIS	9 Apr–6 May 2007	2,991	37.2	29.9	1.4	2.7	8.1	20.6	7.3

=== Victory likelihood ===
The table below lists opinion polling on the perceived likelihood of victory for each party in the event of a regional election taking place.

Polling firm/Commissioner	Fieldwork date	Sample size	PP	PSOE	UPL	IUCyL	Other/ None	Question	Lead
CIS	9 Apr–6 May 2007	2,991	63.2	9.8	0.0	0.2	0.8	25.9	53.4

=== Preferred President ===
The table below lists opinion polling on leader preferences to become president of the Regional Government of Castile and León.

Polling firm/Commissioner	Fieldwork date	Sample size				Other/ None/ Not care	Question	Lead
Polling firm/Commissioner	Fieldwork date	Sample size	Herrera PP	Villalba PSOE	González IUCyL	Other/ None/ Not care	Question	Lead
CIS	9 Apr–6 May 2007	2,991	37.4	21.6	1.9	2.6	36.5	15.8

== Results ==
=== Overall ===
← Summary of the 27 May 2007 Cortes of Castile and León election results →
Parties and alliances	Popular vote			Seats	
Parties and alliances	Votes	%	±pp	Total	+/−
People's Party (PP)	748,746	49.17	+0.68	48	±0
Spanish Socialist Workers' Party (PSOE)	574,596	37.73	+0.96	33	+1
United Left–The Greens–Commitment for Castile and León (IU–LV–CyL)	46,878	3.08	−0.37	0	±0
Leonese People's Union–United Zamora (UPL–ZU)^{1}	41,519	2.73	−1.28	2	±0
Alternative for Castile and León (ACAL)	17,496	1.15	−0.19	0	±0
Commoners' Land–Alternative for Castile and León (TC–ACAL)	16,069	1.06	−0.13	0	±0
Party of El Bierzo–Alternative for Castile and León (PB–ACAL)	1,427	0.09	−0.06	0	±0
Independent Candidacy–The Party of Castile and León (CI–PCL)	16,435	1.08	+0.37	0	±0
Union of the Salamancan People (UPSa)	7,965	0.52	+0.10	0	±0
The Greens (LV)	5,562	0.37	−0.10	0	±0
The Greens of Europe (LVE)	5,481	0.36	New	0	±0
Leonese Autonomist Party–Leonesist Unity (PAL–UL)	4,972	0.33	New	0	±0
Initiative for the Development of Soria (IDES)	3,760	0.25	+0.13	0	±0
Zamoran Independent Electors–Zamoran People's Union (ADEIZA–UPZ)	3,241	0.21	+0.08	0	±0
Republican Left (IR)	2,941	0.19	+0.04	0	±0
Regionalist Party of the Leonese Country (PREPAL)	1,713	0.11	−0.01	0	±0
National Democracy (DN)	1,522	0.10	New	0	±0
Independent Segovian Alternative (ASí)	1,214	0.08	±0.00	0	±0
Citizens of Burgos (CiBu)	1,148	0.08	New	0	±0
Spanish Phalanx of the CNSO (FE de las JONS)^{2}	1,147	0.08	+0.04	0	±0
Communist Party of the Castilian People (PCPC)	1,121	0.07	New	0	±0
Regionalist Party of El Bierzo (PRB)	1,028	0.07	±0.00	0	±0
Regionalist Unity of Castile and León (URCL)	914	0.06	−0.28	0	±0
Democratic and Social Centre (CDS)	713	0.05	−0.14	0	±0
The Phalanx (FE)	559	0.04	−0.04	0	±0
Citizens' Group (AGRUCI)	523	0.03	New	0	±0
Humanist Party (PH)	462	0.03	−0.10	0	±0
Liberal Democratic Centre (CDL)	330	0.02	New	0	±0
Liberal Centrist Union (UCL)	315	0.02	−0.02	0	±0
Authentic Phalanx (FA)	290	0.02	±0.00	0	±0
Blank ballots	30,200	1.98	−0.32		
Total	1,522,791			83	+1
Valid votes	1,522,791	99.20	+0.06		
Invalid votes	12,305	0.80	−0.06		
Votes cast / turnout	1,535,096	70.70	−1.96		
Abstentions	636,096	29.30	+1.96		
Registered voters	2,171,192				
Sources
Footnotes: ^{1} Leonese People's Union–United Zamora results are compared to the combined totals of Leonese People's Union and United Zamora in the 2003 election.; ^{2} Spanish Phalanx of the CNSO results are compared to Independent Spanish Phalanx–Phalanx 2000 totals in the 2003 election.

Popular vote
PP	49.17%
PSOE	37.73%
IU–LV–CyL	3.08%
UPL	2.73%
ACAL	1.15%
CI–PCL	1.08%
Others	3.08%
Blank ballots	1.98%

Seats
PP	57.83%
PSOE	39.76%
UPL	2.41%

=== Distribution by constituency ===
Constituency	PP		PSOE		UPL	
Constituency	%	S	%	S	%	S
Ávila	58.9	5	32.3	2		
Burgos	51.6	7	35.3	4		
León	39.6	6	39.7	6	13.4	2
Palencia	49.2	4	40.2	3		
Salamanca	53.0	7	37.6	4		
Segovia	52.9	4	37.5	2		
Soria	50.4	3	36.7	2		
Valladolid	48.8	8	38.9	7		
Zamora	51.2	4	37.3	3	0.6	−
Total	49.2	48	37.7	33	2.7	2

== Aftermath ==
=== Government formation ===
Investiture; Nomination of Juan Vicente Herrera (PP)
Ballot →	27 June 2007
Required majority →	42 out of 83
Yes: • PP (48)	48 / 83
No: • PSOE (33); • UPL (2)	35 / 83
Abstentions	0 / 83
Absentees	0 / 83

== Bibliography ==
- Ley Orgánica 4/1983, de 25 de febrero, de Estatuto de Autonomía de Castilla-León (Organic Law 4/1983). Official State Gazette (in Spanish). 25 February 1983. BOE-A-1983-6483.
- Ley Orgánica 5/1985, de 19 de junio, del Régimen Electoral General (Organic Law 5/1985). Official State Gazette (in Spanish). 19 June 1985 [version as of 20 April 2007]. BOE-A-1985-11672.
- Ley 3/1987, de 30 de marzo, Electoral de Castilla y León (Law 3/1987). Official State Gazette (in Spanish). 30 March 1987 [version as of 30 December 1998]. BOE-A-1987-9475.
- Ley Orgánica 4/1999, de 8 de enero, de reforma de la Ley Orgánica 4/1983, de Estatuto de Autonomía de Castilla y León (Organic Law 4/1999). Official State Gazette (in Spanish). 8 January 1999. BOE-A-1999-459.
- Ley 3/2001, de 3 de julio, del Gobierno y de la Administración de la Comunidad de Castilla y León (Law 3/2001). Official State Gazette (in Spanish). 3 July 2001 [version as of 30 October 2006]. BOE-A-2001-14243.
- Decreto 1/2007, de 2 de abril, del Presidente de la Junta de Castilla y León, por el que se convocan elecciones a las Cortes de Castilla y León (PDF) (Decree 1/2007). Official Gazette of Castile and León (in Spanish). 2 April 2007. BOCYL-D-03042007-1.
