= 1999 Castilian-Leonese regional election =

Election in the Spanish region of Castile and León

- 13 June 1999

All 83 seats in the Cortes of Castile and León 42 seats needed for a majority
- Opinion polls
- Registered: 2,185,507 ▲3.1%
- Turnout: 1,476,858 (67.6%) ▼5.9 pp
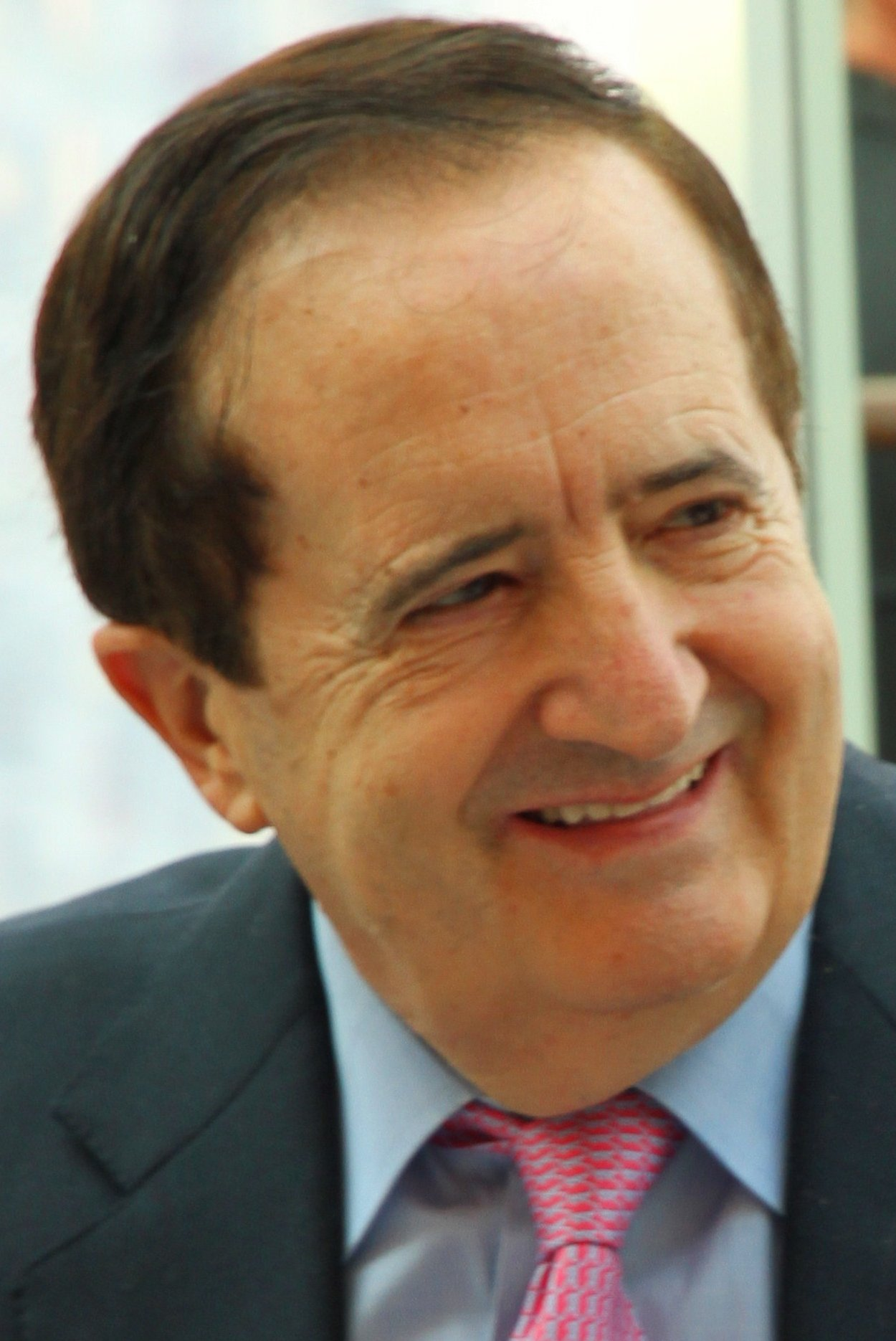

	First party	Second party	Third party
Leader	Juan José Lucas	Jaime González	Antonio Herreros
Party	PP	PSOE	IUCyL
Leader since	14 January 1991	18 October 1997	1991
Leader's seat	Valladolid	León	Valladolid
Last election	50 seats, 52.2%	27 seats, 29.7%	5 seats, 9.6%
Seats won	48	30	1
Seat change	▼2	▲3	▼4
Popular vote	737,982	483,675	79,390
Percentage	50.4%	33.1%	5.4%
Swing	▼1.8 pp	▲3.4 pp	▼4.2 pp
	Fourth party	Fifth party
Leader	Joaquín Otero	Carlos Rad
Party	UPL	TC–PNC
Leader since	13 September 1997	1999
Leader's seat	León	Burgos
Last election	2 seats, 2.6%	0 seats, 0.6%
Seats won	3	1
Seat change	▲1	▲1
Popular vote	54,158	20,274
Percentage	3.7%	1.4%
Swing	▲1.1 pp	▲0.8 pp
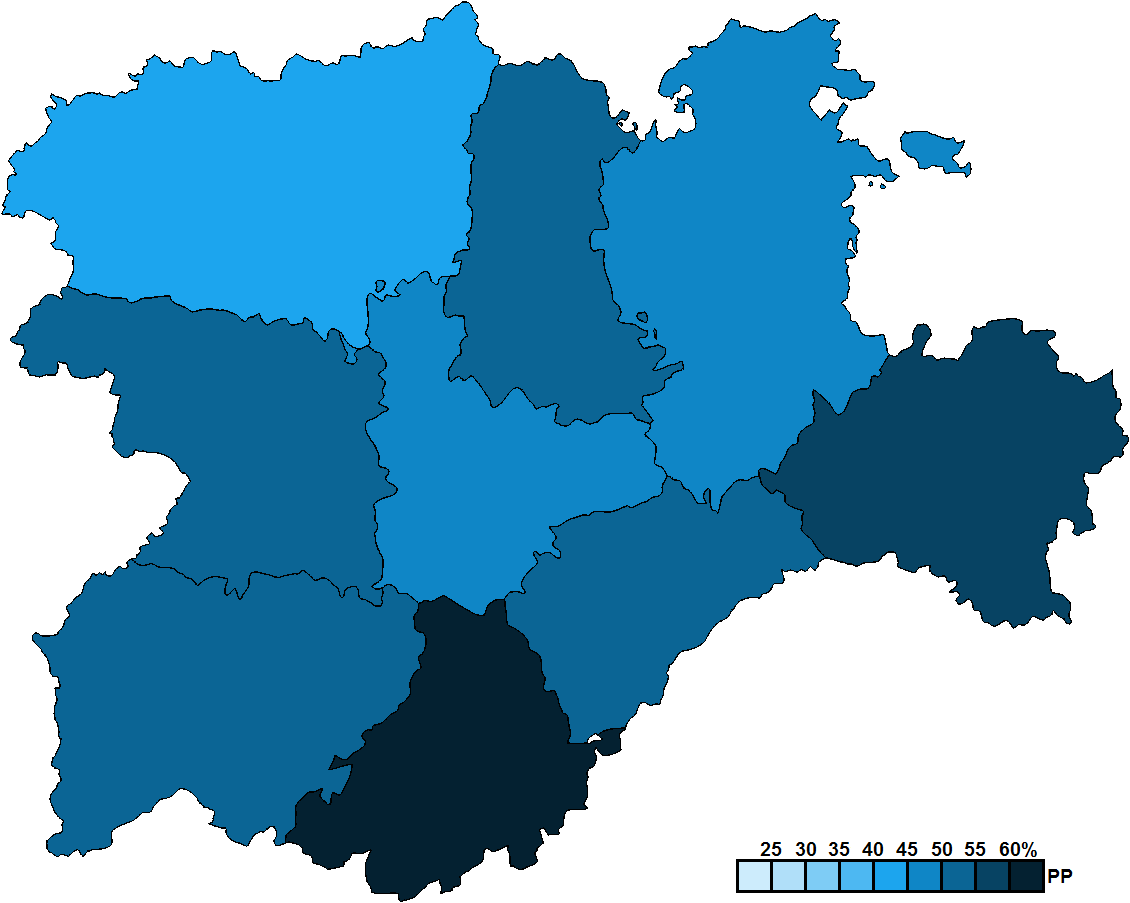
- Constituency results map for the Cortes of Castile and León
President before election
Juan José Lucas
PP
President after election
Juan José Lucas
PP

A regional election was held in Castile and León on 13 June 1999 to elect the 5th Cortes of the autonomous community. All 83 seats in the Cortes were up for election. It was held concurrently with regional elections in twelve other autonomous communities and local elections all across Spain, as well as the 1999 European Parliament election.

== Overview ==
Under the 1999 Statute of Autonomy, the Cortes of Castile and León was the unicameral legislature of the homonymous autonomous community, having legislative power in devolved matters, as well as the ability to grant or withdraw confidence from a regional president. The electoral and procedural rules were supplemented by national law provisions.

=== Date ===
The term of the Cortes of Castile and León expired four years after the date of its previous ordinary election, with election day being fixed for the fourth Sunday of May every four years, but a 1998 amendment allowed for regional elections held in May 1995 to be held concurrently with European Parliament elections, provided that they were scheduled for within a four month-timespan. The election decree was required to be issued no later than 25 days before the scheduled expiration date of parliament and published on the following day in the Official Gazette of Castile and León (BOCYL). The previous election was held on 28 May 1995, setting the date for election day concurrently with that year's European Parliament election on 13 June 1999.

Amendments earlier in 1999 granted the regional president the prerogative to dissolve the Cortes of Castile and León at any given time and call a snap election, provided that no motion of no confidence was in process, no nationwide election had been called and that dissolution did not occur either during the first legislative session or during the last year of parliament before its planned expiration, nor before one year after a previous one. In the event of an investiture process failing to elect a regional president within a two-month period from the first ballot, the Cortes were to be automatically dissolved and a fresh election called, except if it happened in the final year before the expiry of the legislative term. Any snap election held as a result of these circumstances would not alter the period to the next ordinary election, with elected lawmakers serving the remainder of its original four-year term.

The election to the Cortes of Castile and León was officially called on 20 April 1999 with the publication of the corresponding decree in the BOCYL, setting election day for 13 June and scheduling for the chamber to reconvene on 5 July.

=== Electoral system ===
Voting for the Cortes was based on universal suffrage, comprising all Spanish nationals over 18 years of age, registered in Castile and León and with full political rights, provided that they had not been deprived of the right to vote by a final sentence, nor were legally incapacitated.

The Cortes of Castile and León had three seats per each multi-member constituency—corresponding to the provinces of Ávila, Burgos, León, Palencia, Salamanca, Segovia, Soria, Valladolid and Zamora—plus one additional seat per 45,000 inhabitants or fraction above 22,500. All were elected using the D'Hondt method and closed-list proportional voting, with a three percent-threshold of valid votes (including blank ballots) in each constituency. The use of this electoral method resulted in a higher effective threshold depending on district magnitude and vote distribution.

As a result of the aforementioned allocation, each Cortes constituency was entitled the following seats:

Seats	Constituencies
14	León^{(−1)}, Valladolid
11	Burgos, Salamanca
8	Zamora
7	Ávila, Palencia
6	Segovia
5	Soria

The law did not provide for by-elections to fill vacant seats; instead, any vacancies arising after the proclamation of candidates and during the legislative term were filled by the next candidates on the party lists or, when required, by designated substitutes.

=== Outgoing parliament ===
The table below shows the composition of the parliamentary groups in the chamber at the time of the election call.

Parliamentary composition in April 1999
Groups	Parties	Legislators	
Groups	Parties	Seats	Total
People's Parliamentary Group	PP	50	50
Socialist Parliamentary Group	PSOE	27	27
United Left–Left of Castile and León's Parliamentary Group	IUCyL	4	4
Mixed Parliamentary Group	UPL	1	3
Mixed Parliamentary Group	INDEP	2 (Note: Conchi Farto, former UPL legislator; and Elena Pérez, former IUCyL legislator.)	3

== Parties and candidates ==
The electoral law allowed for parties and federations registered in the interior ministry, alliances and groupings of electors to present lists of candidates. Parties and federations intending to form an alliance were required to inform the relevant electoral commission within 10 days of the election call, whereas groupings of electors needed to secure the signature of at least one percent of the electorate in the constituencies for which they sought election, disallowing electors from signing for more than one list.

Below is a list of the main parties and alliances which contested the election:

Candidacy	Parties and alliances	Leading candidate	Ideology	Previous result		Gov.	Ref.
Candidacy	Parties and alliances	Leading candidate	Ideology	Vote %	Seats	Gov.	Ref.
PP	List: People's Party (PP)	Juan José Lucas	Conservatism; Christian democracy	52.2%	50	Yes	
PSOE	List: Spanish Socialist Workers' Party (PSOE)	Jaime González	Social democracy	29.7%	27	No	
IUCyL	List: United Left of Castile and León (IUCyL) – Communist Party of Castile and León (PCCyL) – Socialist Action Party (PASOC) – Republican Left (IR) – Revolutionary Workers' Party (POR) – Workers' Revolutionary Party (PRT)	Antonio Herreros	Socialism; Communism	9.6%	5	No	
UPL	List: Leonese People's Union (UPL)	Joaquín Otero	Leonesism; Regionalism; Autonomism	2.6%	2	No	
TC–PNC	List: Commoners' Land–Castilian Nationalist Party (TC–PNC)	Carlos Rad	Castilian nationalism Progressivism	0.6%	0	No	

== Opinion polls ==
The tables below list opinion polling results in reverse chronological order, showing the most recent first and using the dates when the survey fieldwork was done, as opposed to the date of publication. Where the fieldwork dates are unknown, the date of publication is given instead. The highest percentage figure in each polling survey is displayed with its background shaded in the leading party's colour. If a tie ensues, this is applied to the figures with the highest percentages. The "Lead" column on the right shows the percentage-point difference between the parties with the highest percentages in a poll.

=== Voting intention estimates ===
The table below lists weighted voting intention estimates. Refusals are generally excluded from the party vote percentages, while question wording and the treatment of "don't know" responses and those not intending to vote may vary between polling organisations. When available, seat projections determined by the polling organisations are displayed below (or in place of) the percentages in a smaller font; 42 seats were required for an absolute majority in the Cortes of Castile and León (43 in the 1995 election).

Polling firm/Commissioner	Fieldwork date	Sample size	Turnout	PP	PSOE	IU	UPL	TC	Lead
1999 regional election	13 Jun 1999	—N/a	67.6	50.4; 48	33.1; 30	5.4; 1	3.7; 3	1.4; 1	17.3
Eco Consulting/ABC	24 May–2 Jun 1999	?	?	51.6; 49/51	28.6; 24/26	10.1; 6	3.2; 2	–	23.0
Demoscopia/El País	26 May–1 Jun 1999	?	71	56.3; 52/53	32.4; 26/28	6.1; 3	1.6; 1/2	–	23.9
Sigma Dos/El Mundo	24–31 May 1999	1,750	?	53.1; 47/51	32.7; 27/31	7.7; 2/4	2.9; 2	–	20.4
CIS	3–21 May 1999	2,990	73.3	52.9; 51	30.6; 27/28	8.3; 3	2.5; 1/2	–	22.3
1996 general election	3 Mar 1996	—N/a	79.0	52.2 (49)	35.0 (30)	9.1 (5)	0.7 (0)	0.3 (0)	17.2
1995 regional election	28 May 1995	—N/a	73.5	52.2; 50	29.7; 27	9.6; 5	2.6; 2	0.6; 0	22.5

=== Voting preferences ===
The table below lists raw, unweighted voting preferences.

Polling firm/Commissioner	Fieldwork date	Sample size	PP	PSOE	IU	UPL	TC	Question	X mark	Lead
1999 regional election (Note: Does not include non-resident citizens.)	13 Jun 1999	—N/a	34.7	22.6	3.7	2.5	1.0	—N/a	30.7	12.1
CIS	3–21 May 1999	2,990	36.6	19.5	4.0	1.6	–	29.0	5.3	17.1
1996 general election	3 Mar 1996	—N/a	41.6	27.7	7.3	0.6	0.2	—N/a	20.1	13.9
1995 regional election	28 May 1995	—N/a	37.9	21.4	7.0	1.9	0.4	—N/a	25.6	16.5

=== Victory preferences ===
The table below lists opinion polling on the victory preferences for each party in the event of a regional election taking place.

Polling firm/Commissioner	Fieldwork date	Sample size	PP	PSOE	IU	UPL	Other/ None	Question	Lead
CIS	3–21 May 1999	2,990	40.0	21.0	4.4	2.0	1.5	31.1	19.0

=== Victory likelihood ===
The table below lists opinion polling on the perceived likelihood of victory for each party in the event of a regional election taking place.

Polling firm/Commissioner	Fieldwork date	Sample size	PP	PSOE	IU	UPL	Other/ None	Question	Lead
CIS	3–21 May 1999	2,990	72.9	3.6	0.2	0.1	0.0	23.2	69.3

=== Preferred President ===
The table below lists opinion polling on leader preferences to become president of the Regional Government of Castile and León.

Polling firm/Commissioner	Fieldwork date	Sample size				Other/ None/ Not care	Question	Lead
Polling firm/Commissioner	Fieldwork date	Sample size	Lucas PP	González PSOE	Herreros IUCyL	Other/ None/ Not care	Question	Lead
CIS	3–21 May 1999	2,990	37.9	10.7	4.5	2.2	44.7	27.2

== Results ==
=== Overall ===
← Summary of the 13 June 1999 Cortes of Castile and León election results →
Parties and alliances	Popular vote			Seats	
Parties and alliances	Votes	%	±pp	Total	+/−
People's Party (PP)	737,982	50.45	−1.75	48	−2
Spanish Socialist Workers' Party (PSOE)	483,675	33.06	+3.35	30	+3
United Left of Castile and León (IUCyL)	79,390	5.43	−4.15	1	−4
Leonese People's Union (UPL)	54,158	3.70	+1.15	3	+1
Commoners' Land–Castilian Nationalist Party (TC–PNC)	20,274	1.39	+0.77	1	+1
Regionalist Unity of Castile and León (URCL)	11,195	0.77	+0.36	0	±0
Centrist Union–Democratic and Social Centre (UC–CDS)	10,422	0.71	New	0	±0
Independent Candidacy of Valladolid (CIV)	6,784	0.46	+0.32	0	±0
Party of El Bierzo (PB)	3,851	0.26	−0.17	0	±0
Spanish Democratic Party (PADE)	3,237	0.22	New	0	±0
Salamanca–Zamora–León–PREPAL (PREPAL)	3,043	0.21	−0.03	0	±0
Humanist Party (PH)	2,333	0.16	New	0	±0
Independent Salamancan Union (USI)	1,851	0.13	New	0	±0
Zamoran People's Union (UPZ)	1,556	0.11	New	0	±0
The Greens–Green Group (LV–GV)	1,383	0.09	±0.00	0	±0
Spanish Phalanx of the CNSO (FE–JONS)	1,012	0.07	±0.00	0	±0
Confederation of the Greens (LV)	791	0.05	New	0	±0
Party of Self-employed of Spain and Spanish Independent Groups (PAE–I)	565	0.04	New	0	±0
Nationalist Party of Castile and León (PANCAL)	276	0.02	New	0	±0
Blank ballots	39,036	2.67	+0.84		
Total	1,462,814			83	−1
Valid votes	1,462,814	99.05	−0.06		
Invalid votes	14,044	0.95	+0.06		
Votes cast / turnout	1,476,858	67.58	−6.01		
Abstentions	711,396	32.42	+6.01		
Registered voters	2,185,507				

Popular vote
PP	50.45%
PSOE	33.06%
IUCyL	5.43%
UPL	3.70%
TC–PNC	1.39%
Others	3.30%
Blank ballots	2.67%

Seats
PP	57.83%
PSOE	36.14%
UPL	3.61%
IUCyL	1.20%
TC–PNC	1.20%

=== Distribution by constituency ===
Constituency	PP		PSOE		IUCyL		UPL		TC–PNC	
Constituency	%	S	%	S	%	S	%	S	%	S
Ávila	62.4	5	26.9	2	6.4	−			0.4	−
Burgos	48.7	6	31.6	4	6.8	−			7.4	1
León	42.5	6	31.0	5	4.0	−	18.4	3	0.1	−
Palencia	51.0	4	37.7	3	5.8	−			0.9	−
Salamanca	54.9	7	34.1	4	3.9	−			0.3	−
Segovia	53.7	4	32.1	2	5.8	−			0.6	−
Soria	56.7	3	32.1	2	5.8	−			0.8	−
Valladolid	48.7	8	36.1	5	7.5	1			0.8	−
Zamora	53.0	5	33.9	3	2.9	−			0.2	−
Total	50.4	48	33.1	30	5.4	1	3.7	3	1.4	1

== Aftermath ==
=== Government formation ===
Investiture; Nomination of Juan José Lucas (PP)
Ballot →	13 July 1999
Required majority →	42 out of 83
Yes: • PP (48)	48 / 83
No: • PSOE (30); • UPL (3); • IUCyL (1); • TC–PNC (1)	35 / 83
Abstentions	0 / 83
Absentees	0 / 83

=== 2001 investiture ===
Investiture; Nomination of Juan Vicente Herrera (PP)
Ballot →	15 March 2001
Required majority →	42 out of 83
Yes: • PP (48)	48 / 83
No: • PSOE (30); • UPL (3); • IUCyL (1)	34 / 83
Abstentions: • TC–PNC (1)	1 / 83
Absentees	0 / 83

== Bibliography ==
- Ley Orgánica 4/1983, de 25 de febrero, de Estatuto de Autonomía de Castilla-León (Organic Law 4/1983). Official State Gazette (in Spanish). 25 February 1983. BOE-A-1983-6483.
- Ley Orgánica 5/1985, de 19 de junio, del Régimen Electoral General (Organic Law 5/1985). Official State Gazette (in Spanish). 19 June 1985 [version as of 22 April 1999]. BOE-A-1985-11672.
- Ley 3/1987, de 30 de marzo, Electoral de Castilla y León (Law 3/1987). Official State Gazette (in Spanish). 30 March 1987 [version as of 30 December 1998]. BOE-A-1987-9475.
- Ley Orgánica 4/1999, de 8 de enero, de reforma de la Ley Orgánica 4/1983, de Estatuto de Autonomía de Castilla y León (Organic Law 4/1999). Official State Gazette (in Spanish). 8 January 1999. BOE-A-1999-459.
- Decreto 66/1999, de 19 de abril, por el que se convocan elecciones a las Cortes de Castilla y León (PDF) (Decree 66/1999). Official Gazette of Castile and León (in Spanish). 19 April 1999. BOCYL-D-20041999-1.
