= Leonese Autonomist Party–Leonesist Unity =

Leonese Autonomist Party–Leonesist Unity Partido Autonomista Leonés–Unidad Leonesista
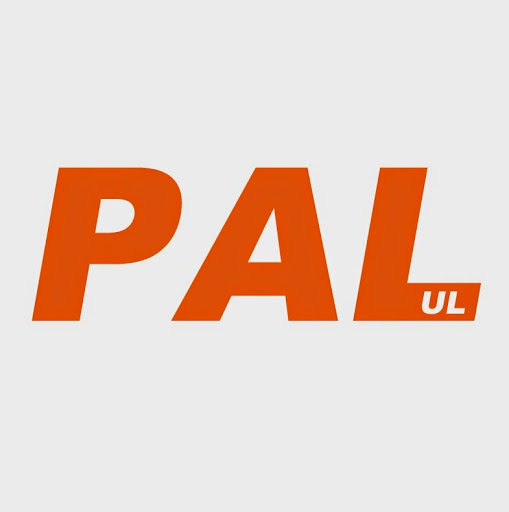
- President: Pablo Peyuca González González
- Founder: José María Rodríguez de Francisco
- Founded: 2005
- Ideology: Leonesism
- Local government (Province of León): 7 / 1,661

Website
- Official website

Leonese Autonomist Party–Leonesist Unity (PAL–UL, Spanish: Partido Autonomista Leonés–Unidad Leonesista) is a Leonese regionalist political party founded in 2005 by ex-members of the Leonese People's Union (UPL), led by José María Rodríguez de Francisco.

The party won 10 local seats in the 2011 local elections and 7 in the 2015 ones.
