= Conceyu Xoven =

Spanish political youth organization

Conceyu Xoven Flag

Conceyu Xoven ("Young Council" in Leonese) was a Spanish political youth organization that demanded the self-determination of the proposed Leonese Country. It was affiliated with the Leonese People's Union as its youth wing until April 2010, when they were replaced by the Leonesist Youth.

Conceyu Xoven claimed to have had more than 1,500 members and to have been the most important organization in the Leonese Country, having won the University of León elections for students. The organization defended the self-government of the Spanish provinces of León, Zamora, Salamanca and a so-called "reunification" referendum in territories from other provinces, autonomous communities and countries, as the "Carrión Strip" (Palencia), the Valderaduey valley (Valladolid), El Barco de Ávila-Piedrahita area (Ávila), Valdeorras & Viana (Galicia) and the Portuguese Bragança District. From the beginning until the end of the organization's activity the General Secretary of Conceyu Xoven was Abel Pardo Fernández.

== Participation in elections ==
Members of the organization participated in several municipal elections in the Spanish provinces of León and Zamora within regionalist UPL, and its General Secretary became the councillor for Education, New Technologies and Leonese Culture in León. Some members of the organization also participated in the lists of the Salamancan People's Union in the province of Salamanca, where they got two town councillors elected.

== Flag ==
The flag of the organization was a red field with a thin golden circle and a golden sun symbol within. The colors were those of the Leonese flag and the sun symbol represented the South Astur people, origin of Leonese region, according to Conceyu Xoven.

== Language ==
Conceyu Xoven used to make use of Leonese language as the official language of the organization, and developed some initiatives for its recognition, like a campaign for the officiality of Leonese language in the reform of the Castile and León Autonomy Statute.

== See also ==
- Leonese People's Union
- Leonese language
- Kingdom of León
