= Commoners' Land =

Commoners' Land Tierra Comunera
- President: Lorenzo Amaro Peces
- Secretary-General: Luis Marcos Naveira
- Founded: 7 November 1988
- Dissolved: 19 January 2009
- Merged into: Castilian Party–Commoners' Land
- Headquarters: C/ Valdemoro 1, Burgos
- Newspaper: Informaciones Comuneras
- Youth wing: Juventudes Comuneras Castellanas
- Ideology: Castilian nationalism Federalism; Progressivism; Republicanism; Ecologism; Environmentalism
- Political position: Centre-left
- Colours: Purple, yellow, red, and white

Website
- www.tierracomunera.org

Tierra Comunera (English: Commoners' Land, TC) was a Castilian nationalist political party in the Spanish historical region of Castile. It was modelled after the Basque and Catalan nationalist parties but did not advocate full independence for Castile, instead favoring cooperation or unification among what they called the five Castilian regions within Spain (Castile and León, Castile-La Mancha, Madrid, Cantabria and La Rioja). It considered itself a left-of-centre, social democratic and environmentalist party.

== Election results ==
=== Cortes of Castile and León ===
Date	Votes			Seats		Status	Size
Date	#	%	±pp	#	±	Status	Size
1991	1,900	0.13%	–	0 / 84	–	N/A	15th
1995	With TC–PNC	0.60%	+0.47	0 / 84	0	N/A	5th
1999	With TC–PNC	1.39%	+0.79	1 / 83	1	Opposition	5th
2003	With TC–PNC	1.19%	–0.20	0 / 82	0	N/A	5th
2007	With TC–ACAL	1.06	–0.13	0 / 83	0	N/A	6th

=== Cortes of Castilla–La Mancha ===
Date	Votes			Seats		Status	Size
Date	#	%	±pp	#	±	Status	Size
1991	918	0.10%	–	0 / 47	–	N/A	10th
1995	With TC–PNC	0.13%	+0.03	0 / 47	0	N/A	8th
1999	With TC–PNC	0.17%	+0.04	0 / 47	0	N/A	6th
2003	With TC–PNC	0.20%	+0.03	0 / 47	0	N/A	4th
2007	2,525	0.23%	+0.03	0 / 47	0	N/A	5th

=== Assembly of Madrid ===
Date	Votes			Seats		Status	Size
Date	#	%	±pp	#	±	Status	Size
1999	With TC–PNC	0.06%	–	0 / 102	–	N/A	15th
May 2003	With TC–PNC	0.06%	+0.00	0 / 111	0	N/A	18th
Oct 2003	With TC–PNC	0.04%	–0.02	0 / 111	0	N/A	18th
