= People's Party of Castile and León =

People's Party of Castile and León Partido Popular de Castilla y León
- President: Alfonso Fernández Mañueco
- Secretary-General: Francisco Vázquez Requero
- Founded: 1989
- Headquarters: C/ María de Molina, nº 7-1º Plta. ED. Las Francesas; Valladolid, Castile and León
- Ideology: Conservatism; Christian democracy Regionalism; Localism; Conservative liberalism
- Political position: Centre-right to right-wing
- National affiliation: People's Party
- Cortes of Castile and León: 33 / 82
- Congress of Deputies (Castilian-Leonese seats): 18 / 31
- Senate (Castilian-Leonese seats): 19 / 39

Website
- ppcyl.es/web/

The People's Party of Castile and León (Spanish: Partido Popular de Castilla y León, PP) is the regional section of the People's Party of Spain (PP) in Castile and León. It was formed in 1989 from the re-foundation of the People's Alliance.

Its president is Alfonso Fernández Mañueco, current president of the Junta de Castilla y León. He succeeded Juan Vicente Herrera, former president of the Junta de Castilla y León, who had been in office for fourteen years.

== Electoral performance ==
=== Cortes of Castile and León ===
Cortes of Castile and León
Election	Leading candidate	Votes	%	Seats	Gov.
1991	Juan José Lucas	602,773	43.5 (#1)	43 / 84	Yes
1995	Juan José Lucas	805,553	52.2 (#1)	50 / 84	Yes
1999	Juan José Lucas	737,982	50.4 (#1)	48 / 84	Yes
2003	Juan Vicente Herrera	760,510	48.5 (#1)	48 / 84	Yes
2007	Juan Vicente Herrera	748,746	49.2 (#1)	48 / 84	Yes
2011	Juan Vicente Herrera	739,502	51.6 (#1)	53 / 84	Yes
2015	Juan Vicente Herrera	514,301	37.7 (#1)	42 / 84	Yes
2019	Alfonso Fernández Mañueco	433,905	31.5 (#2)	29 / 81	Yes
2022	Alfonso Fernández Mañueco	382,157	31.4 (#1)	31 / 81	Yes
2026	Alfonso Fernández Mañueco	444,296	35.4 (#1)	33 / 82	Yes
