= Leonese People's Union =

Leonese People's Union Unión del Pueblo Leonés
- President: Carlos Javier Salgado
- Secretary-General: Alicia Gallego
- Founded: 1986
- Headquarters: Avda. República Argentina, 13 bis-1º, 24004 León
- Youth wing: Leonist Youth
- Membership (2014): 2,300
- Ideology: Leonesism; Regionalism; Autonomism; Ruralism
- Political position: Centre
- Colours: Dark magenta Black
- Cortes of Castile and León: 3 / 83
- Provincial deputations (Note: Provincial Deputations in the Leonese Country, formed by the provinces of León, Zamora and Salamanca.): 3 / 75
- Mayors (Note: Mayors in the Leonese Country, formed by the provinces of León, Zamora and Salamanca.): 19 / 821
- Local Government (2023-2027) (Note: Town councillors in the Leonese Country, formed by the provinces of León, Zamora and Salamanca.): 234 / 5,194

Party flag

Website
- www.upl.es

The Leonese People's Union (Spanish: Unión del Pueblo Leonés, Leonese: Unión del Pueblu Llionés, UPL) is a regional political party in Castilla y León, Spain. UPL strives to establish a separate autonomous community (Comunidad Autónoma de León or Autonomous Community of León) for the provinces of León, Zamora and Salamanca (center of the old Kingdom of León), now in the Autonomous Community of Castilla y León. Such a movement is known as Leonesism.

== History ==
UPL was founded in 1986 by a group of people coming from different León regionalist movements and various statewide parties (Popular Alliance, Union of the Democratic Centre, Spanish Socialist Workers' Party). Initially it was known as Leonesist Union (Unión Leonesista, UNLE). It adopted its current name in 1991, when José María Rodríguez de Francisco took over the leadership of the party. In the municipality of León the party obtained three seats in the municipal council. It also won one seat in the provincial council.

In the municipal elections in 2007, UPL obtained 10.88% and three seats in the municipal council of León. In the Castile and León autonomous elections the same year, it obtained 2.69% of the votes and two seats over 83.

Its youth branch was Conceyu Xoven, an organization that promotes official status for the Leonese language and the unity and self-determination for the Leonese Country. Conceyu Xoven was expelled from the party due to its radical positions, with the Leonist Youth being designated the new youth wing of UPL.

== Electoral performance ==
=== Cortes of Castile and León ===
Date	Votes			Seats		Status	Size
Date	#	%	±pp	#	±	Status	Size
1987	8,960	0.6%	–	0 / 84	–	N/A	8th
1991	11,432	0.8%	+0.2	0 / 84	0	N/A	6th
1995	39,425	2.5%	+1.7	2 / 84	2	Opposition	4th
1999	54,158	3.7%	+1.2	3 / 84	1	Opposition	3rd
2003	60,331	3.9%	+0.2	2 / 82	1	Opposition	3rd
2007	41,519	2.7%	–1.2	2 / 83	0	Opposition	3rd
2011	26,660	1.9%	–0.8	1 / 84	1	Opposition	4th
2015	19,176	1.4%	–0.5	1 / 84	0	Opposition	6th
2019	27,888	2.0%	+0.6	1 / 84	0	Opposition	7th
2022	52,098	4.3%	+2.3	3 / 81	2	Opposition	6th
2026	53,805	4.4%	+0.1	3 / 82	0	TBD	4th

== See also ==
- Region of León
- Kingdom of León
- Leonese language
