= Leonesism =

Leonese regionalist movement in Spain

Map of the Region of León, proposed to conform a new autonomous community within Spain. The Region of León is composed by the provinces of León, Zamora and Salamanca.

Flag commonly used by supporters of Leonesism

Leonesism (Leonese: Llionesismu; Spanish: Leonesismo) is a social and political regionalist movement in the geographical Region of León, composed by the provinces of León, Zamora and Salamanca, with the aim of giving greater relevance to the Region of León within Spain and to protect the historic identity of the region. One of the main objectives of Leonesism is to establish an autonomous community of its own for the Region of León and to separate it from the region of Old Castile (Castilla la Vieja) with which it forms the already existing autonomous community of Castile and León.

Leonesism enjoys strong support from the inhabitants of the Region of León. According to a 2020 poll, 81.0% of the inhabitants of the Province of León, 59.0% of those of the Province of Zamora and 55.7% of those of the Province of Salamanca would support the initiative. In the rest of Castile and León, the movement is largely unpopular; only 17.7% of people there would support the separation of the Region of León. The aforementioned poll was also conducted at a national level, and it turned out that 54.9% of Spaniards supported establishing a new autonomous community for the Region of León while 45.1% rejected this. Furthermore, as of 2021, up to 50 municipalities of Castile and León have approved a motion advocating for the splitting of the autonomous community. Although this motion was proposed by the Leonese People's Union, members of various parties in Spain, such as the People's Party, the Spanish Socialist Workers' Party, Podemos, Citizens and Vox, have also expressed their support for this.

== See also ==
- National and regional identity in Spain
