= 1987 Spanish local elections in Castile and León =

This article presents the results breakdown of the local elections held in Castile and León on 10 June 1987. The following tables show detailed results in the autonomous community's most populous municipalities, sorted alphabetically.

== City control ==
The following table lists party control in the most populous municipalities, including provincial capitals (highlighted in bold). Gains for a party are highlighted in that party's colour.

| Municipality | Population | Previous control | New control |
|---|---|---|---|
| **Ávila** | 43,603 | People's Alliance (AP) | Democratic and Social Centre (CDS) |
| **Burgos** | 158,331 | Independent Solution (SI) | Independent Solution (SI) (PP in 1990) |
| **León** | 134,641 | Independents of León (IL) | People's Alliance (AP) |
| **Palencia** | 75,403 | People's Alliance (AP) | People's Alliance (AP) |
| Ponferrada | 59,258 | Spanish Socialist Workers' Party (PSOE) | Spanish Socialist Workers' Party (PSOE) |
| **Salamanca** | 152,833 | Spanish Socialist Workers' Party (PSOE) | People's Alliance (AP) |
| **Segovia** | 53,397 | People's Democratic Party (PDP) | Democratic and Social Centre (CDS) |
| **Soria** | 31,144 | Liberal Party (PL) | People's Alliance (AP) |
| **Valladolid** | 327,452 | Spanish Socialist Workers' Party (PSOE) | Spanish Socialist Workers' Party (PSOE) |
| **Zamora** | 60,364 | Spanish Socialist Workers' Party (PSOE) | People's Alliance (AP) |

== Municipalities ==
=== Ávila ===
Population: 43,603

← Summary of the 10 June 1987 City Council of Ávila election results →
| Parties and alliances | Popular vote | | | Seats | |
| Parties and alliances | Votes | % | ±pp | Total | +/− |
|---|---|---|---|---|---|
| Democratic and Social Centre (CDS) | 10,988 | 47.67 | +25.06 | 11 | +6 |
| People's Alliance (AP)^{1} | 5,617 | 24.37 | −15.78 | 6 | −3 |
| Spanish Socialist Workers' Party (PSOE) | 3,592 | 15.58 | −16.72 | 3 | −4 |
| United Left (IU)^{2} | 1,250 | 5.42 | +1.74 | 1 | +1 |
| People's Democratic Party (PDP) | 606 | 2.63 | New | 0 | ±0 |
| Liberal Party (PL) | 537 | 2.33 | New | 0 | ±0 |
| Humanist Platform (PH) | 51 | 0.22 | New | 0 | ±0 |
| Blank ballots | 407 | 1.77 | +1.77 | | |
| Total | 23,048 | | | 21 | ±0 |
| Valid votes | 23,048 | 98.26 | −1.74 | | |
| Invalid votes | 408 | 1.74 | +1.74 | | |
| Votes cast / turnout | 23,456 | 72.96 | +7.98 | | |
| Abstentions | 8,693 | 27.04 | −7.98 | | |
| Registered voters | 32,149 | | | | |
Sources
Footnotes: ^{1} People's Alliance results are compared to People's Coalition totals in the 1983 election.; ^{2} United Left results are compared to Communist Party of Spain totals in the 1983 election.

=== Burgos ===
Population: 158,331

← Summary of the 10 June 1987 City Council of Burgos election results →
| Parties and alliances | Popular vote | | | Seats | |
| Parties and alliances | Votes | % | ±pp | Total | +/− |
|---|---|---|---|---|---|
| Independent Solution (SI) | 44,438 | 53.62 | New | 17 | +17 |
| Spanish Socialist Workers' Party (PSOE) | 23,097 | 27.87 | −2.49 | 8 | −1 |
| Democratic and Social Centre (CDS) | 7,780 | 9.39 | +6.95 | 2 | +2 |
| United Left (IU)^{1} | 4,053 | 4.89 | +1.89 | 0 | ±0 |
| People's Democratic Party (PDP) | 1,065 | 1.28 | New | 0 | ±0 |
| Workers' Party of Spain–Communist Unity (PTE–UC) | 485 | 0.59 | New | 0 | ±0 |
| Humanist Platform (PH) | 334 | 0.40 | New | 0 | ±0 |
| People's Coalition (AP–PDP–UL) | n/a | n/a | −59.28 | 0 | −18 |
| Blank ballots | 1,629 | 1.97 | +1.97 | | |
| Total | 82,881 | | | 27 | ±0 |
| Valid votes | 82,881 | 98.44 | −1.56 | | |
| Invalid votes | 1,313 | 1.56 | +1.56 | | |
| Votes cast / turnout | 84,194 | 71.86 | +7.11 | | |
| Abstentions | 32,966 | 28.14 | −7.11 | | |
| Registered voters | 117,160 | | | | |
Sources
Footnotes: ^{1} United Left results are compared to Communist Party of Spain totals in the 1983 election.

=== León ===
Population: 134,641

← Summary of the 10 June 1987 City Council of León election results →
| Parties and alliances | Popular vote | | | Seats | |
| Parties and alliances | Votes | % | ±pp | Total | +/− |
|---|---|---|---|---|---|
| Independents of León (IL) | 26,108 | 37.99 | +0.62 | 12 | +1 |
| Spanish Socialist Workers' Party (PSOE) | 20,553 | 29.91 | −7.96 | 9 | −2 |
| People's Alliance (AP)^{1} | 10,210 | 14.86 | −4.66 | 4 | −1 |
| Democratic and Social Centre (CDS) | 5,466 | 7.95 | +6.93 | 2 | +2 |
| United Left (IU)^{2} | 2,206 | 3.21 | +0.54 | 0 | ±0 |
| Leonesist Union (UNLE) | 1,362 | 1.98 | New | 0 | ±0 |
| People's Democratic Party (PDP) | 1,055 | 1.54 | New | 0 | ±0 |
| Liberal Party (PL) | 428 | 0.62 | New | 0 | ±0 |
| Workers' Party of Spain–Communist Unity (PTE–UC) | 266 | 0.39 | New | 0 | ±0 |
| Humanist Platform (PH) | 145 | 0.21 | New | 0 | ±0 |
| Blank ballots | 924 | 1.34 | +1.34 | | |
| Total | 68,723 | | | 27 | ±0 |
| Valid votes | 68,723 | 98.58 | −1.42 | | |
| Invalid votes | 993 | 1.42 | +1.42 | | |
| Votes cast / turnout | 69,716 | 70.47 | +4.31 | | |
| Abstentions | 29,218 | 29.53 | −4.31 | | |
| Registered voters | 98,934 | | | | |
Sources
Footnotes: ^{1} People's Alliance results are compared to People's Coalition totals in the 1983 election.; ^{2} United Left results are compared to Communist Party of Spain totals in the 1983 election.

=== Palencia ===
Population: 75,403

← Summary of the 10 June 1987 City Council of Palencia election results →
| Parties and alliances | Popular vote | | | Seats | |
| Parties and alliances | Votes | % | ±pp | Total | +/− |
|---|---|---|---|---|---|
| People's Alliance (AP)^{1} | 16,034 | 41.35 | −9.20 | 11 | −3 |
| Spanish Socialist Workers' Party (PSOE) | 13,466 | 34.72 | −4.88 | 9 | −1 |
| Democratic and Social Centre (CDS) | 5,385 | 13.89 | +10.89 | 3 | +3 |
| United Left (IU)^{2} | 3,469 | 8.95 | +2.10 | 2 | +1 |
| Workers' Party of Spain–Communist Unity (PTE–UC) | 302 | 0.78 | New | 0 | ±0 |
| Humanist Platform (PH) | 123 | 0.32 | New | 0 | ±0 |
| Blank ballots | 0 | 0.00 | ±0.00 | | |
| Total | 38,779 | | | 25 | ±0 |
| Valid votes | 38,779 | 98.19 | −1.81 | | |
| Invalid votes | 713 | 1.81 | +1.81 | | |
| Votes cast / turnout | 39,492 | 71.44 | +0.26 | | |
| Abstentions | 15,791 | 28.56 | −0.26 | | |
| Registered voters | 55,283 | | | | |
Sources
Footnotes: ^{1} People's Alliance results are compared to People's Coalition totals in the 1983 election.; ^{2} United Left results are compared to Communist Party of Spain totals in the 1983 election.

=== Ponferrada ===
Population: 59,258

← Summary of the 10 June 1987 City Council of Ponferrada election results →
| Parties and alliances | Popular vote | | | Seats | |
| Parties and alliances | Votes | % | ±pp | Total | +/− |
|---|---|---|---|---|---|
| Spanish Socialist Workers' Party (PSOE) | 12,514 | 44.88 | −22.53 | 13 | −7 |
| People's Alliance (AP)^{1} | 6,268 | 22.48 | +3.50 | 6 | +1 |
| Party of El Bierzo (PB) | 3,493 | 12.53 | +8.23 | 3 | +3 |
| Democratic and Social Centre (CDS) | 2,836 | 10.17 | +8.81 | 3 | +3 |
| People's Democratic Party (PDP) | 1,269 | 4.55 | New | 0 | ±0 |
| United Left (IU)^{2} | 1,209 | 4.34 | +0.60 | 0 | ±0 |
| Blank ballots | 292 | 1.05 | +1.05 | | |
| Total | 27,881 | | | 25 | ±0 |
| Valid votes | 27,881 | 98.43 | −1.57 | | |
| Invalid votes | 444 | 1.57 | +1.57 | | |
| Votes cast / turnout | 28,325 | 64.21 | +3.75 | | |
| Abstentions | 15,789 | 35.79 | −3.75 | | |
| Registered voters | 44,114 | | | | |
Sources
Footnotes: ^{1} People's Alliance results are compared to People's Coalition totals in the 1983 election.; ^{2} United Left results are compared to Communist Party of Spain totals in the 1983 election.

=== Salamanca ===
Population: 152,833

← Summary of the 10 June 1987 City Council of Salamanca election results →
| Parties and alliances | Popular vote | | | Seats | |
| Parties and alliances | Votes | % | ±pp | Total | +/− |
|---|---|---|---|---|---|
| People's Alliance (AP)^{1} | 28,950 | 33.89 | −0.27 | 10 | ±0 |
| Spanish Socialist Workers' Party (PSOE) | 28,599 | 33.48 | −23.19 | 10 | −7 |
| Democratic and Social Centre (CDS) | 19,170 | 22.44 | +17.90 | 7 | +7 |
| United Left (IU)^{2} | 3,254 | 3.81 | +1.06 | 0 | ±0 |
| The Greens (LV) | 1,081 | 1.27 | New | 0 | ±0 |
| Liberal Party (PL) | 970 | 1.14 | New | 0 | ±0 |
| People's Democratic Party (PDP) | 925 | 1.08 | New | 0 | ±0 |
| Workers' Party of Spain–Communist Unity (PTE–UC) | 471 | 0.55 | New | 0 | ±0 |
| Humanist Platform (PH) | 290 | 0.34 | New | 0 | ±0 |
| Regionalist Party of the Leonese Country (PREPAL) | 262 | 0.31 | New | 0 | ±0 |
| Spanish Phalanx of the CNSO (FE–JONS) | 210 | 0.25 | New | 0 | ±0 |
| Blank ballots | 1,243 | 1.46 | +1.46 | | |
| Total | 85,425 | | | 27 | ±0 |
| Valid votes | 85,425 | 98.35 | −1.65 | | |
| Invalid votes | 1,429 | 1.65 | +1.65 | | |
| Votes cast / turnout | 86,854 | 74.19 | +3.47 | | |
| Abstentions | 30,223 | 25.81 | −3.47 | | |
| Registered voters | 117,077 | | | | |
Sources
Footnotes: ^{1} People's Alliance results are compared to People's Coalition totals in the 1983 election.; ^{2} United Left results are compared to Communist Party of Spain totals in the 1983 election.

=== Segovia ===
Population: 53,397

← Summary of the 10 June 1987 City Council of Segovia election results →
| Parties and alliances | Popular vote | | | Seats | |
| Parties and alliances | Votes | % | ±pp | Total | +/− |
|---|---|---|---|---|---|
| Spanish Socialist Workers' Party (PSOE) | 8,164 | 29.15 | −8.30 | 8 | −2 |
| Democratic and Social Centre (CDS) | 7,144 | 25.51 | +16.68 | 7 | +5 |
| People's Alliance (AP)^{1} | 6,274 | 22.40 | −13.13 | 6 | −4 |
| People's Democratic Party (PDP) | 2,951 | 10.54 | New | 2 | +2 |
| United Left (IU)^{2} | 2,756 | 9.84 | +5.75 | 2 | +2 |
| Humanist Platform (PH) | 122 | 0.44 | New | 0 | ±0 |
| Independents (INDEP) | n/a | n/a | −8.45 | 0 | −2 |
| Liberal Democratic Party (PDL) | n/a | n/a | −5.63 | 0 | −1 |
| Blank ballots | 597 | 2.13 | +2.13 | | |
| Total | 28,008 | | | 25 | ±0 |
| Valid votes | 28,008 | 98.35 | −1.65 | | |
| Invalid votes | 470 | 1.65 | +1.65 | | |
| Votes cast / turnout | 28,478 | 70.81 | +3.99 | | |
| Abstentions | 11,737 | 29.19 | −3.99 | | |
| Registered voters | 40,215 | | | | |
Sources
Footnotes: ^{1} People's Alliance results are compared to People's Coalition totals in the 1983 election.; ^{2} United Left results are compared to Communist Party of Spain totals in the 1983 election.

=== Soria ===
Population: 31,144

← Summary of the 10 June 1987 City Council of Soria election results →
| Parties and alliances | Popular vote | | | Seats | |
| Parties and alliances | Votes | % | ±pp | Total | +/− |
|---|---|---|---|---|---|
| People's Alliance (AP)^{1} | 6,201 | 40.15 | −14.42 | 10 | −2 |
| Spanish Socialist Workers' Party (PSOE) | 4,774 | 30.91 | −14.52 | 8 | −1 |
| Democratic and Social Centre (CDS) | 1,786 | 11.56 | New | 3 | +3 |
| Democratic Group of Independent Sorians (ADIS) | 653 | 4.23 | New | 0 | ±0 |
| United Left (IU) | 599 | 3.88 | New | 0 | ±0 |
| People's Democratic Party (PDP) | 549 | 3.55 | New | 0 | ±0 |
| Independent (in Soria Capital) (INDEP) | 395 | 2.56 | New | 0 | ±0 |
| Spanish Phalanx of the CNSO (FE–JONS) | 75 | 0.49 | New | 0 | ±0 |
| Nationalist Party of Castile and León (PANCAL) | 60 | 0.39 | New | 0 | ±0 |
| Blank ballots | 354 | 2.29 | +2.29 | | |
| Total | 15,446 | | | 21 | ±0 |
| Valid votes | 15,446 | 96.19 | −3.81 | | |
| Invalid votes | 612 | 3.81 | +3.81 | | |
| Votes cast / turnout | 16,058 | 67.93 | +12.77 | | |
| Abstentions | 7,582 | 32.07 | −12.77 | | |
| Registered voters | 23,640 | | | | |
Sources
Footnotes: ^{1} People's Alliance results are compared to People's Coalition totals in the 1983 election.

=== Valladolid ===
Population: 327,452

← Summary of the 10 June 1987 City Council of Valladolid election results →
| Parties and alliances | Popular vote | | | Seats | |
| Parties and alliances | Votes | % | ±pp | Total | +/− |
|---|---|---|---|---|---|
| Spanish Socialist Workers' Party (PSOE) | 59,945 | 35.47 | −23.14 | 12 | −7 |
| People's Alliance (AP)^{1} | 47,663 | 28.20 | −2.44 | 9 | ±0 |
| Democratic and Social Centre (CDS) | 39,606 | 23.43 | +19.21 | 7 | +7 |
| United Left (IU)^{2} | 9,587 | 5.67 | +0.18 | 1 | ±0 |
| Workers' Party of Spain–Communist Unity (PTE–UC) | 5,551 | 3.28 | New | 0 | ±0 |
| People's Democratic Party (PDP) | 2,022 | 1.20 | New | 0 | ±0 |
| Nationalist Party of Castile and León (PANCAL) | 634 | 0.38 | New | 0 | ±0 |
| Humanist Platform (PH) | 607 | 0.36 | New | 0 | ±0 |
| Spanish Phalanx of the CNSO (FE–JONS) | 511 | 0.30 | New | 0 | ±0 |
| Spanish Ruralist Party (BAR–PRE) | 492 | 0.29 | −0.24 | 0 | ±0 |
| Blank ballots | 2,387 | 1.41 | +1.41 | | |
| Total | 169,005 | | | 29 | ±0 |
| Valid votes | 169,005 | 98.33 | −1.67 | | |
| Invalid votes | 2,872 | 1.67 | +1.67 | | |
| Votes cast / turnout | 171,877 | 71.41 | +6.86 | | |
| Abstentions | 68,813 | 28.59 | −6.86 | | |
| Registered voters | 240,690 | | | | |
Sources
Footnotes: ^{1} People's Alliance results are compared to People's Coalition totals in the 1983 election.; ^{2} United Left results are compared to Communist Party of Spain totals in the 1983 election.

=== Zamora ===
Population: 60,364

← Summary of the 10 June 1987 City Council of Zamora election results →
| Parties and alliances | Popular vote | | | Seats | |
| Parties and alliances | Votes | % | ±pp | Total | +/− |
|---|---|---|---|---|---|
| People's Alliance (AP)^{1} | 11,328 | 37.57 | −1.43 | 11 | ±0 |
| Spanish Socialist Workers' Party (PSOE) | 11,089 | 36.78 | −10.31 | 10 | −3 |
| Democratic and Social Centre (CDS) | 4,392 | 14.57 | +8.70 | 4 | +3 |
| United Left (IU)^{2} | 1,435 | 4.76 | +2.06 | 0 | ±0 |
| People's Democratic Party (PDP) | 656 | 2.18 | New | 0 | ±0 |
| Independent Solution (SI) | 317 | 1.05 | New | 0 | ±0 |
| Regionalist Party of the Leonese Country (PREPAL) | 287 | 0.95 | −1.47 | 0 | ±0 |
| Leonesist Union (UNLE) | 132 | 0.44 | New | 0 | ±0 |
| Humanist Platform (PH) | 73 | 0.24 | New | 0 | ±0 |
| Blank ballots | 444 | 1.47 | +1.47 | | |
| Total | 30,153 | | | 25 | ±0 |
| Valid votes | 30,153 | 96.91 | −3.09 | | |
| Invalid votes | 962 | 3.09 | +3.09 | | |
| Votes cast / turnout | 31,115 | 68.13 | +7.60 | | |
| Abstentions | 14,557 | 31.87 | −7.60 | | |
| Registered voters | 45,672 | | | | |
Sources
Footnotes: ^{1} People's Alliance results are compared to People's Coalition totals in the 1983 election.; ^{2} United Left results are compared to Communist Party of Spain totals in the 1983 election.

== See also ==
- 1987 Castilian-Leonese regional election
