= 2003 Spanish local elections in Castile and León =

This article presents the results breakdown of the local elections held in Castile and León on 25 May 2003. The following tables show detailed results in the autonomous community's most populous municipalities, sorted alphabetically.

== City control ==
The following table lists party control in the most populous municipalities, including provincial capitals (highlighted in bold). Gains for a party are highlighted in that party's colour.

Municipality	Population	Previous control	New control
**Ávila**	50,241	People's Party (PP)	People's Party (PP)
**Burgos**	167,962	Spanish Socialist Workers' Party (PSOE)	People's Party (PP)
**León**	135,794	People's Party (PP)	Spanish Socialist Workers' Party (PSOE) (PP in 2004)
**Palencia**	80,801	Spanish Socialist Workers' Party (PSOE)	Spanish Socialist Workers' Party (PSOE)
Ponferrada	64,010	People's Party (PP)	People's Party (PP)
**Salamanca**	156,006	People's Party (PP)	People's Party (PP)
**Segovia**	54,945	Democratic and Social Centre (CDS)	Spanish Socialist Workers' Party (PSOE)
**Soria**	35,112	Spanish Socialist Workers' Party (PSOE)	People's Party (PP)
**Valladolid**	318,576	People's Party (PP)	People's Party (PP)
**Zamora**	65,575	People's Party (PP)	People's Party (PP)

== Municipalities ==
=== Ávila ===
Population: 50,241

← Summary of the 25 May 2003 City Council of Ávila election results →
Parties and alliances	Popular vote			Seats	
Parties and alliances	Votes	%	±pp	Total	+/−
People's Party (PP)	16,355	56.97	+0.37	15	+2
Spanish Socialist Workers' Party (PSOE)	7,322	25.50	+2.37	7	+2
United Left of Castile and León (IUCyL)	3,213	11.19	−1.09	3	±0
Commoners' Land–Castilian Nationalist Party (TC–PNC)	430	1.50	New	0	±0
Republican Left (IR)	168	0.59	New	0	±0
The Phalanx (FE)	124	0.43	−0.81	0	±0
Humanist Party (PH)	123	0.43	New	0	±0
Independent Spanish Phalanx–Phalanx 2000 (FEI–FE 2000)	52	0.18	New	0	±0
Blank ballots	922	3.21	−1.64		
Total	28,709			25	+4
Valid votes	28,709	98.90	+0.42		
Invalid votes	318	1.10	−0.42		
Votes cast / turnout	29,027	69.79	+7.55		
Abstentions	12,567	30.21	−7.55		
Registered voters	41,594				

=== Burgos ===
Population: 167,962

← Summary of the 25 May 2003 City Council of Burgos election results →
Parties and alliances	Popular vote			Seats	
Parties and alliances	Votes	%	±pp	Total	+/−
People's Party (PP)	43,466	44.14	+9.24	14	+4
Spanish Socialist Workers' Party (PSOE)	33,605	34.13	+3.79	10	+1
Independent Solution (SI)	8,692	8.83	New	2	+2
United Left of Castile and León (IUCyL)	5,013	5.09	−2.59	1	−1
Commoners' Land–Castilian Nationalist Party (TC–PNC)	2,826	2.87	−7.03	0	−3
Independent Burgalese Popular Action (APBI)	1,004	1.02	−10.16	0	−3
Castilian Left (IzCa)	308	0.31	New	0	±0
Democratic and Social Centre (CDS)	186	0.19	New	0	±0
Spanish Democratic Party (PADE)	185	0.19	−1.74	0	±0
Blank ballots	3,191	3.24	−0.48		
Total	98,476			27	±0
Valid votes	98,476	99.32	+0.20		
Invalid votes	674	0.68	−0.20		
Votes cast / turnout	99,150	70.75	+5.95		
Abstentions	40,997	29.25	−5.95		
Registered voters	140,147				

=== León ===
Population: 135,794

← Summary of the 25 May 2003 City Council of León election results →
Parties and alliances	Popular vote			Seats	
Parties and alliances	Votes	%	±pp	Total	+/−
People's Party (PP)	29,788	38.50	−6.11	12	−1
Spanish Socialist Workers' Party (PSOE)	26,493	34.24	+9.57	10	+3
Leonese People's Union (UPL)	14,889	19.24	−3.93	5	−2
United Left of Castile and León (IUCyL)	2,006	2.59	−1.06	0	±0
Leonese United Independent Citizens (CiuLe)	1,296	1.67	New	0	±0
The Greens (LV)	700	0.90	New	0	±0
Republican Left (IR)	167	0.22	New	0	±0
The Phalanx (FE)	90	0.12	−0.03	0	±0
Leonese People for León–PREPAL (PREPAL)	80	0.10	New	0	±0
Independent Spanish Phalanx–Phalanx 2000 (FEI–FE 2000)	43	0.06	New	0	±0
Blank ballots	1,822	2.35	−0.34		
Total	77,374			27	±0
Valid votes	77,374	99.35	+0.18		
Invalid votes	503	0.65	−0.18		
Votes cast / turnout	77,877	65.32	+9.15		
Abstentions	41,344	34.68	−9.15		
Registered voters	119,221				

=== Palencia ===
Population: 80,801

← Summary of the 25 May 2003 City Council of Palencia election results →
Parties and alliances	Popular vote			Seats	
Parties and alliances	Votes	%	±pp	Total	+/−
Spanish Socialist Workers' Party (PSOE)	23,296	49.35	+1.28	13	±0
People's Party (PP)	18,497	39.19	−0.59	11	±0
United Left of Castile and León (IUCyL)	2,432	5.15	−0.20	1	±0
Federation of Associations for Urban Social Respect (FARSU)	863	1.83	+0.16	0	±0
Commoners' Land–Castilian Nationalist Party (TC–PNC)	832	1.76	+1.00	0	±0
Independent Spanish Phalanx–Phalanx 2000 (FEI–FE 2000)	89	0.19	New	0	±0
Blank ballots	1,192	2.53	−0.44		
Total	47,201			25	±0
Valid votes	47,201	99.26	+0.21		
Invalid votes	350	0.74	−0.21		
Votes cast / turnout	47,551	68.98	+4.80		
Abstentions	21,387	31.02	−4.80		
Registered voters	68,938				

=== Ponferrada ===
Population: 64,010

← Summary of the 25 May 2003 City Council of Ponferrada election results →
Parties and alliances	Popular vote			Seats	
Parties and alliances	Votes	%	±pp	Total	+/−
People's Party (PP)	17,747	48.50	−8.84	15	−1
Spanish Socialist Workers' Party (PSOE)	12,058	32.95	+1.97	10	+2
Party of El Bierzo (PB)	1,713	4.68	−0.62	0	−1
Leonese People's Union (UPL)	1,504	4.11	New	0	±0
United Left of Castile and León (IUCyL)	1,477	4.04	−0.56	0	±0
Regionalist Party of El Bierzo (PRB)	900	2.46	New	0	±0
Democratic Regional Alternative (ACD)	547	1.49	New	0	±0
Republican Left (IR)	68	0.19	New	0	±0
Blank ballots	578	1.58	−0.21		
Total	36,592			25	±0
Valid votes	36,592	99.45	+0.23		
Invalid votes	202	0.55	−0.23		
Votes cast / turnout	36,794	68.08	+8.24		
Abstentions	17,251	31.92	−8.24		
Registered voters	54,045				

=== Salamanca ===
Population: 156,006

← Summary of the 25 May 2003 City Council of Salamanca election results →
Parties and alliances	Popular vote			Seats	
Parties and alliances	Votes	%	±pp	Total	+/−
People's Party (PP)	42,110	48.49	−5.42	15	−2
Spanish Socialist Workers' Party (PSOE)	32,880	37.86	+5.65	12	+2
The Greens–Left Forum (LV–FI)	2,945	3.39	New	0	±0
United Left of Castile and León (IUCyL)	2,312	2.66	−1.98	0	±0
Union of the Salamancan People (UPSa)	2,312	2.66	New	0	±0
Regionalist Unity of Castile and León (URCL)	1,928	2.22	−0.14	0	±0
The Phalanx (FE)	181	0.21	±0.00	0	±0
Independent Spanish Phalanx–Phalanx 2000 (FEI–FE 2000)	46	0.05	New	0	±0
Blank ballots	2,122	2.44	−1.45		
Total	86,836			27	±0
Valid votes	86,836	99.35	+0.20		
Invalid votes	566	0.65	−0.20		
Votes cast / turnout	87,402	64.41	+7.00		
Abstentions	48,287	35.59	−7.00		
Registered voters	135,689				

=== Segovia ===
Population: 54,945

← Summary of the 25 May 2003 City Council of Segovia election results →
Parties and alliances	Popular vote			Seats	
Parties and alliances	Votes	%	±pp	Total	+/−
People's Party (PP)	12,160	39.75	−1.44	12	±0
Spanish Socialist Workers' Party (PSOE)	11,156	36.47	+10.07	11	+4
United Left of Castile and León (IUCyL)	2,308	7.54	−6.45	2	−2
Independent Segovian Alternative (ASí)	1,526	4.99	New	0	±0
The Greens–Green Group (LV–GV)	1,130	3.69	+1.39	0	±0
Democratic and Social Centre (CDS)	862	2.82	−4.51	0	−2
Commoners' Land–Castilian Nationalist Party (TC–PNC)	359	1.17	+0.29	0	±0
Spanish Democratic Party (PADE)	184	0.60	−2.91	0	±0
Humanist Party (PH)	54	0.18	−0.03	0	±0
Independent Spanish Phalanx–Phalanx 2000 (FEI–FE 2000)	42	0.14	New	0	±0
Blank ballots	811	2.65	−1.54		
Total	30,592			25	±0
Valid votes	30,592	99.17	+0.56		
Invalid votes	255	0.83	−0.56		
Votes cast / turnout	30,847	69.89	+8.55		
Abstentions	13,287	30.11	−8.55		
Registered voters	44,134				

=== Soria ===
Population: 35,112

← Summary of the 25 May 2003 City Council of Soria election results →
Parties and alliances	Popular vote			Seats	
Parties and alliances	Votes	%	±pp	Total	+/−
People's Party (PP)	7,578	41.29	−0.58	10	±0
Spanish Socialist Workers' Party (PSOE)	6,384	34.78	+7.39	8	+2
Initiative for the Development of Soria (IDES)	1,684	9.18	New	2	+2
Independent Sorian Alternative (ALSI)	1,143	6.23	−12.00	1	−3
United Left of Castile and León (IUCyL)	640	3.49	−4.60	0	−1
Social Expression of Sorian Electors (ESO.ES)	298	1.62	New	0	±0
Blank ballots	627	3.42	−1.00		
Total	18,354			21	±0
Valid votes	18,354	98.83	+0.76		
Invalid votes	218	1.17	−0.76		
Votes cast / turnout	18,572	65.90	+12.46		
Abstentions	9,609	34.10	−12.46		
Registered voters	28,181				

=== Valladolid ===
Population: 318,576

← Summary of the 25 May 2003 City Council of Valladolid election results →
Parties and alliances	Popular vote			Seats	
Parties and alliances	Votes	%	±pp	Total	+/−
People's Party (PP)	85,877	44.59	−1.24	15	±0
Spanish Socialist Workers' Party (PSOE)	76,662	39.81	+2.76	13	+1
United Left of Castile and León (IUCyL)	10,264	5.33	−2.37	1	−1
Independent Candidacy–The Party of Castile and León (CI–PCL)	7,040	3.66	−0.15	0	±0
Citizen Participation Coordinator (CPC)	3,377	1.75	New	0	±0
Commoners' Land–Castilian Nationalist Party (TC–PNC)	1,325	0.69	+0.23	0	±0
Castilian Left (IzCa)	1,242	0.64	New	0	±0
Democratic and Social Centre (CDS)	624	0.32	−0.24	0	±0
Humanist Party (PH)	466	0.24	+0.03	0	±0
Independent Spanish Phalanx–Phalanx 2000 (FEI–FE 2000)	306	0.16	−0.05	0	±0
Regionalist Unity of Castile and León (URCL)	306	0.16	−0.20	0	±0
Republican Left (IR)	222	0.12	New	0	±0
Liberal Centrist Union (UCL)	0	0.00	New	0	±0
Blank ballots	4,880	2.53	−0.20		
Total	192,591			29	±0
Valid votes	192,591	99.50	+0.19		
Invalid votes	971	0.50	−0.19		
Votes cast / turnout	193,562	70.73	+7.27		
Abstentions	80,111	29.27	−7.27		
Registered voters	273,673				

=== Zamora ===
Population: 65,575

← Summary of the 25 May 2003 City Council of Zamora election results →
Parties and alliances	Popular vote			Seats	
Parties and alliances	Votes	%	±pp	Total	+/−
People's Party (PP)	15,548	45.00	−5.12	13	−2
Spanish Socialist Workers' Party (PSOE)^{1}	10,076	29.16	−1.89	8	±0
United Left of Castile and León (IUCyL)	3,570	10.33	+5.15	2	+1
Zamoran Independent Electors (ADEIZA)	2,646	7.66	+5.00	2	+2
United Zamora (ZU)	930	2.69	New	0	±0
Leonese People's Union (UPL)	818	2.37	New	0	±0
Zamoran People for Zamora–PREPAL (PREPAL)	330	0.96	−0.71	0	±0
Centrist Union–Democratic and Social Centre (UC–CDS)	n/a	n/a	−5.85	0	−1
Blank ballots	633	1.83	−1.24		
Total	34,551			25	±0
Valid votes	34,551	99.21	+0.50		
Invalid votes	275	0.79	−0.50		
Votes cast / turnout	34,826	61.70	+4.54		
Abstentions	21,614	38.30	−4.54		
Registered voters	56,440				
Sources
Footnotes: ^{1} Spanish Socialist Workers' Party results are compared to the combined totals of Spanish Socialist Workers' Party and Democratic Party of the New Left in the 1999 election.

== See also ==
- 2003 Castilian-Leonese regional election
