= 1995 Spanish local elections in Castile and León =

This article presents the results breakdown of the local elections held in Castile and León on 28 May 1995. The following tables show detailed results in the autonomous community's most populous municipalities, sorted alphabetically.

== City control ==
The following table lists party control in the most populous municipalities, including provincial capitals (highlighted in bold). Gains for a party are highlighted in that party's colour.

Municipality	Population	Previous control	New control
**Ávila**	49,639	People's Party (PP)	People's Party (PP)
**Burgos**	166,251	People's Party (PP)	People's Party (PP)
**León**	147,311	People's Party (PP)	People's Party (PP)
**Palencia**	79,561	Spanish Socialist Workers' Party (PSOE)	People's Party (PP)
Ponferrada	61,505	Spanish Socialist Workers' Party (PSOE)	People's Party (PP)
**Salamanca**	167,382	Spanish Socialist Workers' Party (PSOE)	People's Party (PP)
**Segovia**	55,372	People's Party (PP)	People's Party (PP)
**Soria**	33,317	People's Party (PP)	People's Party (PP)
**Valladolid**	336,917	Spanish Socialist Workers' Party (PSOE)	People's Party (PP)
**Zamora**	65,885	Spanish Socialist Workers' Party (PSOE)	People's Party (PP)

== Municipalities ==
=== Ávila ===
Population: 49,639

← Summary of the 28 May 1995 City Council of Ávila election results →
Parties and alliances	Popular vote			Seats	
Parties and alliances	Votes	%	±pp	Total	+/−
People's Party (PP)	16,344	63.79	+17.12	14	+3
Spanish Socialist Workers' Party (PSOE)	3,689	14.40	−3.88	3	−1
United Left of Castile and León (IU)	3,612	14.10	+6.56	3	+2
Independent Group of Ávila (AIAV)	1,411	5.51	New	1	+1
Democratic and Social Centre (CDS)	n/a	n/a	−20.83	0	−5
Blank ballots	564	2.20	+0.27		
Total	25,620			21	±0
Valid votes	25,620	98.83	−0.33		
Invalid votes	302	1.17	+0.33		
Votes cast / turnout	25,922	68.79	+8.07		
Abstentions	11,760	31.21	−8.07		
Registered voters	37,682				

=== Burgos ===
Population: 166,251

← Summary of the 28 May 1995 City Council of Burgos election results →
Parties and alliances	Popular vote			Seats	
Parties and alliances	Votes	%	±pp	Total	+/−
People's Party (PP)	46,133	51.19	+8.86	16	+2
Spanish Socialist Workers' Party (PSOE)	15,680	17.40	−14.93	5	−6
United Left of Castile and León (IU)	14,126	15.67	+8.12	5	+3
Progress, Union and Freedom (PUL)	5,523	6.13	New	1	+1
Independent Solution (SI)	3,131	3.47	New	0	±0
Commoners' Land–Castilian Nationalist Party (TC–PNC)	1,933	2.14	+1.53	0	±0
Unity for Burgos (UPB)	748	0.83	New	0	±0
Burgalese Reality (RB)	561	0.62	New	0	±0
Blank ballots	2,285	2.54	+0.70		
Total	90,120			27	±0
Valid votes	90,120	99.09	−0.11		
Invalid votes	830	0.91	+0.11		
Votes cast / turnout	90,950	68.13	+4.57		
Abstentions	42,543	31.87	−4.57		
Registered voters	133,493				

=== León ===
Population: 147,311

← Summary of the 28 May 1995 City Council of León election results →
Parties and alliances	Popular vote			Seats	
Parties and alliances	Votes	%	±pp	Total	+/−
People's Party (PP)	35,712	45.77	+5.16	14	+1
Spanish Socialist Workers' Party (PSOE)	17,130	21.95	−8.75	6	−4
Leonese People's Union (UPL)	16,888	21.64	+11.49	6	+3
United Left of Castile and León (IU)	5,051	6.47	+1.31	1	±0
Independents for León (IPL)	1,360	1.74	New	0	±0
Leonese People for León (PREPAL)	223	0.29	New	0	±0
Humanist Platform (PH)	98	0.13	New	0	±0
Party of El Bierzo (PB)	49	0.06	New	0	±0
Blank ballots	1,517	1.94	−0.72		
Total	78,028			27	±0
Valid votes	78,028	99.36	+0.35		
Invalid votes	505	0.64	−0.35		
Votes cast / turnout	78,533	67.51	+9.00		
Abstentions	37,800	32.49	−9.00		
Registered voters	116,333				

=== Palencia ===
Population: 79,561

← Summary of the 28 May 1995 City Council of Palencia election results →
Parties and alliances	Popular vote			Seats	
Parties and alliances	Votes	%	±pp	Total	+/−
People's Party (PP)	20,240	45.56	+10.70	13	+3
Spanish Socialist Workers' Party (PSOE)	16,919	38.09	−1.15	10	−1
United Left of Castile and León (IU)	3,890	8.76	+1.81	2	+1
People's Palentine Group (APP)	1,593	3.59	−5.75	0	−2
Democratic and Social Centre (CDS)	424	0.95	−4.28	0	−1
Regionalist Unity of Castile and León (URCL)^{1}	274	0.62	−1.85	0	±0
Commoners' Land–Castilian Nationalist Party (TC–PNC)	238	0.54	New	0	±0
Blank ballots	845	1.90	+0.01		
Total	44,423			25	±0
Valid votes	44,423	99.17	+0.07		
Invalid votes	371	0.83	−0.07		
Votes cast / turnout	44,794	71.09	+8.81		
Abstentions	18,215	28.91	−8.81		
Registered voters	63,009				
Sources
Footnotes: ^{1} Regionalist Unity of Castile and León results are compared to Palentine Unity totals in the 1991 election.

=== Ponferrada ===
Population: 61,505

← Summary of the 28 May 1995 City Council of Ponferrada election results →
Parties and alliances	Popular vote			Seats	
Parties and alliances	Votes	%	±pp	Total	+/−
People's Party (PP)	13,934	44.20	+11.80	12	+3
Spanish Socialist Workers' Party (PSOE)	11,226	35.61	−4.91	9	−2
Party of El Bierzo (PB)	2,741	8.70	−0.49	2	±0
United Left of Castile and León (IU)	2,398	7.61	+2.53	2	+1
Provincialist Party of El Bierzo (PPB)	427	1.35	New	0	±0
Leonese People's Union (UPL)	212	0.67	New	0	±0
Democratic and Social Centre (CDS)	n/a	n/a	−6.84	0	−2
Blank ballots	584	1.85	+0.70		
Total	31,522			25	±0
Valid votes	31,522	99.01	−0.34		
Invalid votes	314	0.99	+0.34		
Votes cast / turnout	31,836	64.88	+8.06		
Abstentions	17,232	35.12	−8.06		
Registered voters	49,068				

=== Salamanca ===
Population: 167,382

← Summary of the 28 May 1995 City Council of Salamanca election results →
Parties and alliances	Popular vote			Seats	
Parties and alliances	Votes	%	±pp	Total	+/−
People's Party (PP)	51,212	54.07	+10.37	16	+3
Spanish Socialist Workers' Party (PSOE)	31,431	33.19	−6.76	9	−3
United Left of Castile and León (IU)	8,170	8.63	+3.44	2	+1
Platform of Independents of Spain (PIE)	914	0.97	New	0	±0
Regionalist Unity of Castile and León (URCL)^{1}	888	0.94	+0.56	0	±0
Salamancan People for Salamanca (PREPAL)	378	0.40	±0.00	0	±0
Democratic and Social Centre (CDS)	n/a	n/a	−5.91	0	−1
Blank ballots	1,714	1.81	+0.07		
Total	94,707			27	±0
Valid votes	94,707	99.38	+0.09		
Invalid votes	588	0.62	−0.09		
Votes cast / turnout	95,295	69.91	+7.81		
Abstentions	41,018	30.09	−7.81		
Registered voters	136,313				
Sources
Footnotes: ^{1} Regionalist Unity of Castile and León results are compared to Regionalist Democracy of Castile and León totals in the 1991 election.

=== Segovia ===
Population: 55,372

← Summary of the 28 May 1995 City Council of Segovia election results →
Parties and alliances	Popular vote			Seats	
Parties and alliances	Votes	%	±pp	Total	+/−
People's Party (PP)	15,815	52.74	+11.83	15	+4
Spanish Socialist Workers' Party (PSOE)	6,717	22.40	−9.13	6	−3
United Left of Castile and León (IU)	4,687	15.63	+5.16	4	+2
Platform of Independents of Spain (PIE)	872	2.91	New	0	±0
The Greens–Green Group (LV–GV)	602	2.01	New	0	±0
Castilian Regionalist Party (PREC)	399	1.33	−0.51	0	±0
Spanish Phalanx of the CNSO (FE–JONS)	101	0.34	New	0	±0
Democratic and Social Centre (CDS)	n/a	n/a	−10.75	0	−3
Blank ballots	792	2.64	+0.18		
Total	29,985			25	±0
Valid votes	29,985	98.97	+0.25		
Invalid votes	312	1.03	−0.25		
Votes cast / turnout	30,297	69.17	+9.32		
Abstentions	13,503	30.83	−9.32		
Registered voters	43,800				

=== Soria ===
Population: 33,317

← Summary of the 28 May 1995 City Council of Soria election results →
Parties and alliances	Popular vote			Seats	
Parties and alliances	Votes	%	±pp	Total	+/−
People's Party (PP)	7,283	45.13	−3.61	11	−1
Spanish Socialist Workers' Party (PSOE)	3,458	21.43	−11.35	5	−3
Independent Sorian Alternative (ALSI)	1,715	10.63	New	2	+2
United Left of Castile and León (IU)	1,549	9.60	+6.68	2	+2
Sorian Neighbourhood Group (AVS)	1,110	6.88	New	1	+1
Centrist Union (UC)	307	1.90	−4.88	0	−1
Sorian Progressive Union (US)	241	1.49	New	0	±0
Blank ballots	475	2.94	+0.08		
Total	16,138			21	±0
Valid votes	16,138	99.09	−0.12		
Invalid votes	149	0.91	+0.12		
Votes cast / turnout	16,287	60.96	+8.06		
Abstentions	10,429	39.04	−8.06		
Registered voters	26,716				

=== Valladolid ===
Population: 336,917

← Summary of the 28 May 1995 City Council of Valladolid election results →
Parties and alliances	Popular vote			Seats	
Parties and alliances	Votes	%	±pp	Total	+/−
People's Party (PP)	91,876	47.33	+6.59	15	+2
Spanish Socialist Workers' Party (PSOE)	65,622	33.80	−4.18	10	−2
United Left of Castile and León (IU)	26,788	13.80	+3.23	4	+1
Independent Candidacy of Valladolid (CIV)	2,132	1.10	New	0	±0
Independent Alliance (AI)	1,719	0.89	New	0	±0
Commoners' Land–Castilian Nationalist Party (TC–PNC)	587	0.30	New	0	±0
Platform of Independents of Spain (PIE)	529	0.27	New	0	±0
Regionalist Unity of Castile and León (URCL)^{1}	496	0.26	−0.64	0	±0
Communist Party of the Peoples of Spain (PCPE)	341	0.18	New	0	±0
Spanish Phalanx of the CNSO (FE–JONS)	318	0.16	−0.11	0	±0
Democratic and Social Centre (CDS)	n/a	n/a	−5.29	0	−1
Blank ballots	3,716	1.91	+0.04		
Total	194,124			29	±0
Valid votes	194,124	99.22	+0.10		
Invalid votes	1,519	0.78	−0.10		
Votes cast / turnout	195,643	71.72	+11.61		
Abstentions	77,149	28.28	−11.61		
Registered voters	272,792				
Sources
Footnotes: ^{1} Regionalist Unity of Castile and León results are compared to Regionalist Democracy of Castile and León totals in the 1991 election.

=== Zamora ===
Population: 65,885

← Summary of the 28 May 1995 City Council of Zamora election results →
Parties and alliances	Popular vote			Seats	
Parties and alliances	Votes	%	±pp	Total	+/−
People's Party (PP)	17,654	52.52	+10.93	14	+3
Spanish Socialist Workers' Party (PSOE)	11,131	33.11	−8.98	9	−3
United Left of Castile and León (IU)	3,062	9.11	+2.85	2	+1
Zamoran People for Zamora (PREPAL)	798	2.37	+1.11	0	±0
Inter-Zamoran Party (PIZ)	335	1.00	New	0	±0
Democratic and Social Centre (CDS)	n/a	n/a	−6.53	0	−1
Blank ballots	637	1.89	−0.38		
Total	33,617			25	±0
Valid votes	33,617	98.44	−0.29		
Invalid votes	533	1.56	+0.29		
Votes cast / turnout	34,150	65.76	+9.36		
Abstentions	17,780	34.24	−9.36		
Registered voters	51,930				

== See also ==
- 1995 Castilian-Leonese regional election
