= 2011 Castilian-Leonese regional election =

Election in the Spanish region of Castile and León

- 22 May 2011

All 84 seats in the Cortes of Castile and León 43 seats needed for a majority
- Opinion polls
- Registered: 2,166,385 ▼0.2%
- Turnout: 1,462,397 (67.5%) ▼3.2 pp
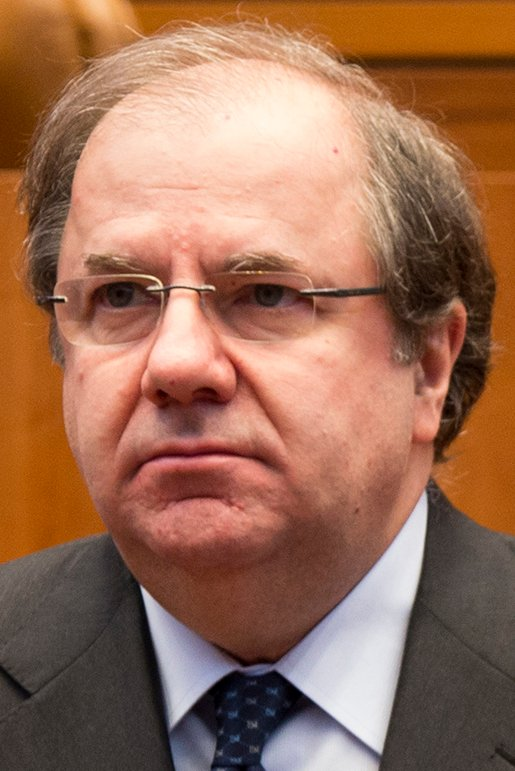

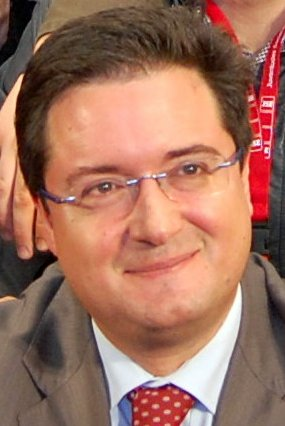

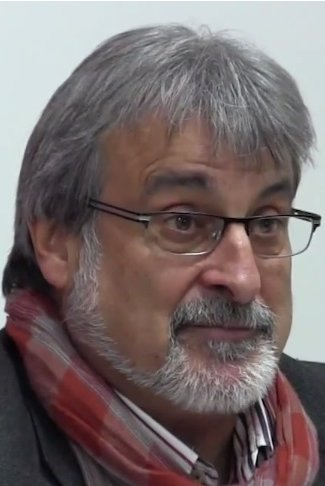

	First party	Second party	Third party
Leader	Juan Vicente Herrera	Óscar López	José María González
Party	PP	PSOE	IUCyL
Leader since	16 March 2001	20 September 2008	21 May 2006
Leader's seat	Burgos	Segovia	Valladolid
Last election	48 seats, 49.2%	33 seats, 37.7%	0 seats, 3.1%
Seats won	53	29	1
Seat change	▲5	▼4	▲1
Popular vote	739,502	425,777	69,872
Percentage	51.6%	29.7%	4.9%
Swing	▲2.4 pp	▼8.0 pp	▲1.8 pp
	Fourth party
Leader	Alejandro Valderas
Party	UPL
Leader since	27 January 2011
Leader's seat	León
Last election	2 seats, 2.7%
Seats won	1
Seat change	▼1
Popular vote	26,660
Percentage	1.9%
Swing	▼0.8 pp
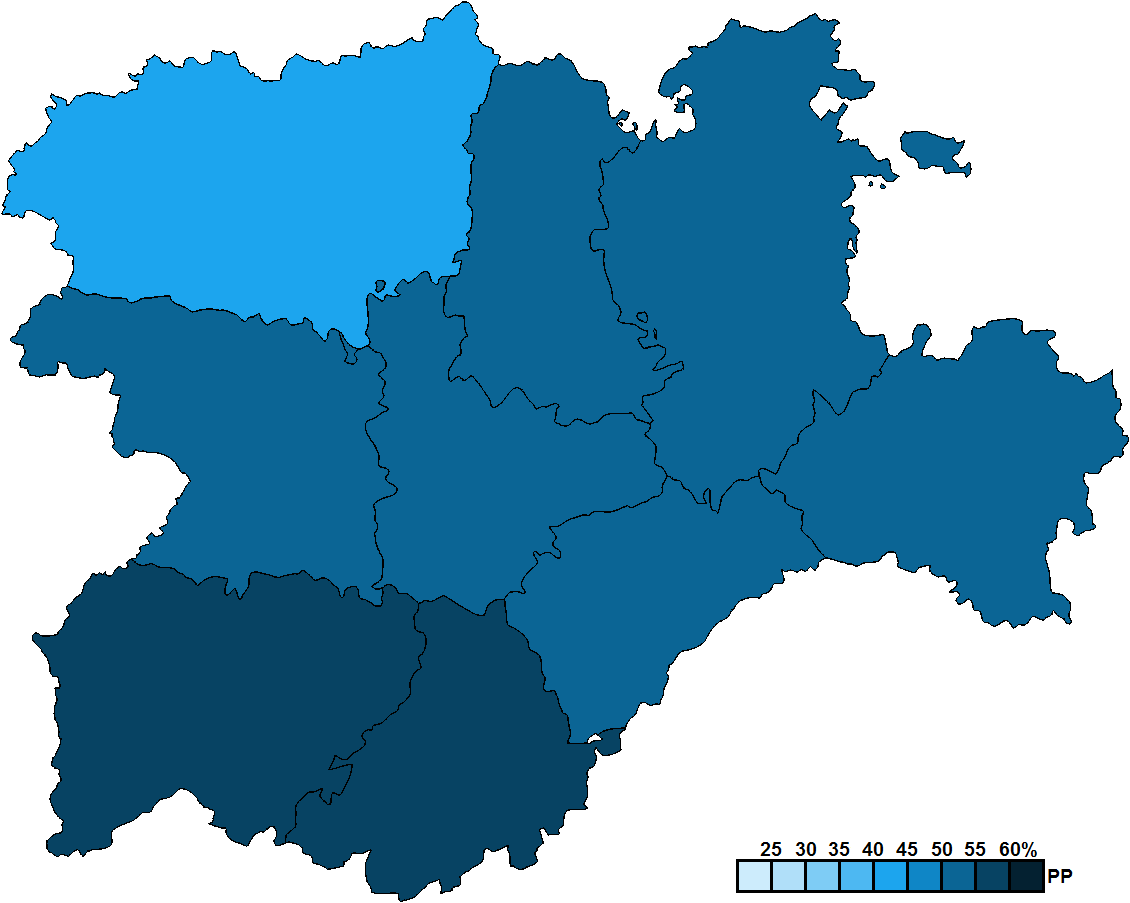
President before election
Juan Vicente Herrera
PP
President after election
Juan Vicente Herrera
PP

A regional election was held in Castile and León on 22 May 2011 to elect the 8th Cortes of the autonomous community. All 84 seats in the Cortes were up for election. It was held concurrently with regional elections in twelve other autonomous communities and local elections all across Spain.

The election saw the People's Party (PP), which had formed the government of the region since the second democratic election in 1987, winning its largest majority to date with over 63% of the seats at stake (53 out of 84 seats), with incumbent president Juan Vicente Herrera being subsequently re-elected for a fourth term in office. The opposition Spanish Socialist Workers' Party (PSOE) and Leonese People's Union (UPL) both lost ground, with the former securing its worst result since 1995, whereas United Left (IU) re-entered parliament for the first time since the 1999 election. The new Union, Progress and Democracy (UPyD) party, while achieving a remarkable result for a first-time national party with 3.3% of the share (and scoring in third place in the Ávila and Burgos constituencies), failed to obtain any seats.

== Overview ==
Under the 2007 Statute of Autonomy, the Cortes of Castile and León was the unicameral legislature of the homonymous autonomous community, having legislative power in devolved matters, as well as the ability to grant or withdraw confidence from a regional president. The electoral and procedural rules were supplemented by national law provisions.

=== Date ===
The term of the Cortes of Castile and León expired four years after the date of their previous election. Amendments in 2007 abolished fixed-term elections, instead allowing the term of the Cortes to expire after an early dissolution. The election decree was required to be issued no later than 25 days before the scheduled expiration date of parliament and published on the following day in the Official Gazette of Castile and León (BOCYL), with election day taking place 54 days after the decree's publication. The previous election was held on 27 May 2007, which meant that the chamber's term would have expired on 27 May 2011. The election decree was required to be published no later than 3 May 2011, setting the latest possible date for election day on 26 June 2011.

The regional president had the prerogative to dissolve the Cortes of Castile and León at any given time and call a snap election, provided that no motion of no confidence was in process and that dissolution did not occur either during the first legislative session or before one year after a previous one. In the event of an investiture process failing to elect a regional president within a two-month period from the first ballot, the Cortes were to be automatically dissolved and a fresh election called.

The election to the Cortes of Castile and León was officially called on 29 March 2011 with the publication of the corresponding decree in the BOCYL, setting election day for 22 May and scheduling for the chamber to reconvene on 14 June.

=== Electoral system ===
Voting for the Cortes was based on universal suffrage, comprising all Spanish nationals over 18 years of age, registered in Castile and León and with full political rights, provided that they had not been deprived of the right to vote by a final sentence, nor were legally incapacitated. Amendments earlier in 2011 required non-resident citizens to apply for voting, a system known as "begged" voting (Spanish: Voto rogado).

The Cortes of Castile and León had three seats per each multi-member constituency—corresponding to the provinces of Ávila, Burgos, León, Palencia, Salamanca, Segovia, Soria, Valladolid and Zamora—plus one additional seat per 45,000 inhabitants or fraction above 22,500. All were elected using the D'Hondt method and closed-list proportional voting, with a three percent-threshold of valid votes (including blank ballots) in each constituency. The use of this electoral method resulted in a higher effective threshold depending on district magnitude and vote distribution.

As a result of the aforementioned allocation, each Cortes constituency was entitled the following seats:

Seats	Constituencies
15	Valladolid
14	León
11	Burgos, Salamanca
7	Ávila, Palencia, Segovia^{(+1)}, Zamora
5	Soria

The law did not provide for by-elections to fill vacant seats; instead, any vacancies arising after the proclamation of candidates and during the legislative term were filled by the next candidates on the party lists or, when required, by designated substitutes.

=== Outgoing parliament ===
The table below shows the composition of the parliamentary groups in the chamber at the time of the election call.

Parliamentary composition in March 2011
Groups	Parties	Legislators	
Groups	Parties	Seats	Total
People's Parliamentary Group	PP	48	48
Socialist Parliamentary Group	PSOE	33	33
Mixed Parliamentary Group	UPL	2	2

== Parties and candidates ==
The electoral law allowed for parties and federations registered in the interior ministry, alliances and groupings of electors to present lists of candidates. Parties and federations intending to form an alliance were required to inform the relevant electoral commission within 10 days of the election call, whereas groupings of electors needed to secure the signature of at least one percent of the electorate in the constituencies for which they sought election, disallowing electors from signing for more than one list. Additionally, a balanced composition of men and women was required in the electoral lists, so that candidates of either sex made up at least 40 percent of the total composition.

Below is a list of the main parties and alliances which contested the election:

Candidacy	Parties and alliances	Leading candidate	Ideology	Previous result		Gov.	Ref.
Candidacy	Parties and alliances	Leading candidate	Ideology	Vote %	Seats	Gov.	Ref.
PP	List: People's Party (PP)	Juan Vicente Herrera	Conservatism; Christian democracy	49.2%	48	Yes	
PSOE	List: Spanish Socialist Workers' Party (PSOE)	Óscar López	Social democracy	37.7%	33	No	
UPL	List: Leonese People's Union (UPL)	Alejandro Valderas	Leonesism; Regionalism; Autonomism	2.7%	2	No	
IUCyL	List: United Left of Castile and León (IUCyL) – Communist Party of Castile and León (PCCyL) – Revolutionary Workers' Party (POR) – Republican Left (IR)	José María González	Socialism; Communism	3.1%	0	No	

== Opinion polls ==
The tables below list opinion polling results in reverse chronological order, showing the most recent first and using the dates when the survey fieldwork was done, as opposed to the date of publication. Where the fieldwork dates are unknown, the date of publication is given instead. The highest percentage figure in each polling survey is displayed with its background shaded in the leading party's colour. If a tie ensues, this is applied to the figures with the highest percentages. The "Lead" column on the right shows the percentage-point difference between the parties with the highest percentages in a poll.

=== Voting intention estimates ===
The table below lists weighted voting intention estimates. Refusals are generally excluded from the party vote percentages, while question wording and the treatment of "don't know" responses and those not intending to vote may vary between polling organisations. When available, seat projections determined by the polling organisations are displayed below (or in place of) the percentages in a smaller font; 43 seats were required for an absolute majority in the Cortes of Castile and León (42 in the 2007 election).

Polling firm/Commissioner	Fieldwork date	Sample size	Turnout	PP	PSOE	IUCyL	UPL	UPyD	Lead
2011 regional election	22 May 2011	—N/a	67.5	51.6; 53	29.7; 29	4.9; 1	1.9; 1	3.3; 0	21.9
TNS Demoscopia/Antena 3	6–10 May 2011	2,000	?	51.8; 50/53	31.9; 29/31	4.8; 0/2	2.4; 1/2	–	19.9
NC Report/La Razón (Note: "El PP blinda sus feudos". La Razón (in Spanish). 16 May 2011. Archived from the original on 16 September 2011.)	3–10 May 2011	?	?	52.8; 49/51	34.6; 30/32	? 0/1	2.3; 1/2	–	18.2
TNS Demoscopia/RTVCyL	26 Apr–3 May 2011	4,600	?	52.4; 51/53	32.4; 30/31	4.6; 0/1	2.1; 1	2.6; 0	20.0
NC Report/La Razón	25 Apr 2011	?	?	53.4; 50/52	35.5; 29/31	3.6; 0/1	2.4; 1/2	–	17.9
Celeste-Tel/Terra	13–20 Apr 2011	900	?	52.9; 51	31.1; 30	5.4; 2	3.3; 1	–	21.8
Ikerfel/Vocento	13–17 Apr 2011	3,200	?	51.5; 51	34.0; 31	4.2; 0	3.4; 2	2.8; 0	17.5
CIS	17 Mar–17 Apr 2011	2,974	?	51.5; 50	32.8; 32	4.3; 1	2.0; 1	2.1; 0	18.7
Sigma Dos/El Mundo	7–12 Apr 2011	1,600	?	53.8; 49/54	33.4; 28/31	3.9; 0/1	2.6; 1/2	–	20.4
TNS Demoscopia/Ical (Note: "IU volvería al Parlamento de Castilla y León (TNS Demoscopia)". Electómetro (in Spanish). 17 April 2011.)	10–28 Mar 2011	5,850	?	54.2; 53/54	31.2; 28/29	5.2; 1	1.7; 1	2.4; 0	23.0
Sigma Dos/El Mundo	20–23 Dec 2010	1,600	?	53.6; 48/54	34.4; 27/33	3.0; 0/1	2.4; 1/2	–	19.2
Sigma Dos/El Mundo	20–24 May 2010	1,600	?	55.1; 52/54	31.4; 28/30	3.9; 0	1.8; 1	3.6; 0	23.7
TNS Demoscopia/Ical	8–20 Apr 2010	2,500	?	49.8; 48/49	34.5; 31/33	5.4; 1/2	2.4; 1/2	1.8; 0	15.3
Obradoiro de Socioloxía/Público	1–6 Mar 2010	800	?	48.9; 49	33.4; 33	6.0; 1	2.0; 0	5.4; 1	15.5
2009 EP election	7 Jun 2009	—N/a	51.4	51.7 (49)	38.2 (34)	2.3 (0)	–	3.7 (0)	13.5
2008 general election	9 Mar 2008	—N/a	77.7	50.0 (46)	42.8 (37)	2.5 (0)	0.3 (0)	1.5 (0)	7.2
2007 regional election	27 May 2007	—N/a	70.7	49.2; 48	37.7; 33	3.1; 0	2.7; 2	–	11.5

=== Voting preferences ===
The table below lists raw, unweighted voting preferences.

Polling firm/Commissioner	Fieldwork date	Sample size	PP	PSOE	IUCyL	UPL	UPyD	Question	X mark	Lead
2011 regional election (Note: Does not include non-resident citizens (electors residing abroad (CERA) and citizens temporarily absent from Spain).)	22 May 2011	—N/a	36.0	20.6	3.4	1.3	2.3	—N/a	28.9	15.4
CIS	17 Mar–17 Apr 2011	2,974	34.4	15.0	2.6	0.8	1.3	32.7	7.7	19.4
Obradoiro de Socioloxía/Público	1–6 Mar 2010	800	36.3	21.2	2.4	0.7	2.7	–	–	15.1
2009 EP election	7 Jun 2009	—N/a	27.3	19.9	1.2	–	1.9	—N/a	47.1	7.4
2008 general election	9 Mar 2008	—N/a	39.9	33.5	2.0	0.2	1.2	—N/a	20.4	6.4
2007 regional election	27 May 2007	—N/a	35.6	27.0	2.2	2.0	–	—N/a	28.6	8.6

=== Victory preferences ===
The table below lists opinion polling on the victory preferences for each party in the event of a regional election taking place.

Polling firm/Commissioner	Fieldwork date	Sample size	PP	PSOE	IUCyL	UPL	UPyD	Other/ None	Question	Lead
CIS	17 Mar–17 Apr 2011	2,974	39.5	19.0	3.3	1.0	1.4	11.4	24.4	20.5

=== Victory likelihood ===
The table below lists opinion polling on the perceived likelihood of victory for each party in the event of a regional election taking place.

Polling firm/Commissioner	Fieldwork date	Sample size	PP	PSOE	IUCyL	UPL	UPyD	Other/ None	Question	Lead
CIS	17 Mar–17 Apr 2011	2,974	73.9	4.1	0.1	0.0	0.0	0.3	21.6	69.8

=== Preferred President ===
The table below lists opinion polling on leader preferences to become president of the Regional Government of Castile and León.

All candidates

Polling firm/Commissioner	Fieldwork date	Sample size						Other/ None/ Not care	Question	Lead
Polling firm/Commissioner	Fieldwork date	Sample size	Herrera PP	López PSOE	González IUCyL	Valderas UPL	Sánchez UPyD	Other/ None/ Not care	Question	Lead
CIS	17 Mar–17 Apr 2011	2,974	35.8	11.1	1.8	0.4	0.8	9.4	40.7	24.7

Herrera vs. López

Polling firm/Commissioner	Fieldwork date	Sample size			Other/ None/ Not care	Question	Lead
Polling firm/Commissioner	Fieldwork date	Sample size	Herrera PP	López PSOE	Other/ None/ Not care	Question	Lead
Obradoiro de Socioloxía/Público	1–6 Mar 2010	800	38.4	17.0	44.6		21.4

== Results ==
=== Overall ===
← Summary of the 22 May 2011 Cortes of Castile and León election results →
Parties and alliances	Popular vote			Seats	
Parties and alliances	Votes	%	±pp	Total	+/−
People's Party (PP)	739,502	51.55	+2.38	53	+5
Spanish Socialist Workers' Party (PSOE)	425,777	29.68	−8.05	29	−4
United Left of Castile and León (IUCyL)	69,872	4.87	+1.79	1	+1
Union, Progress and Democracy (UPyD)	47,040	3.28	New	0	±0
Leonese People's Union (UPL)	26,660	1.86	−0.87	1	−1
Party of Castile and León (PCAL)^{1} ^{2}	13,537	0.94	−0.06	0	±0
The Party of Castile and León–Independent Candidacy (PCL–CI)	10,796	0.75	−0.33	0	±0
Anti-Bullfighting Party Against Mistreatment of Animals (PACMA)	5,368	0.37	New	0	±0
Social Alternative Movement (MASS)	4,777	0.33	New	0	±0
Leonese Autonomist Party–Leonesist Unity (PAL–UL)	3,925	0.27	−0.06	0	±0
Yes for Salamanca (UPSa–C's)^{3}	3,718	0.26	−0.26	0	±0
Citizens for Blank Votes (CenB)	3,545	0.25	New	0	±0
Zamoran Independent Electors–Zamoran People's Union (ADEIZA–UPZ)	3,322	0.23	+0.02	0	±0
Greens of Salamanca (LV)^{2}	2,822	0.20	−0.07	0	±0
Initiative for the Development of Soria (IDES)	2,680	0.19	−0.06	0	±0
The Greens–Green Group (LV–GV)	2,619	0.18	New	0	±0
Party of El Bierzo (PB)	2,401	0.17	+0.08	0	±0
National Democracy (DN)	2,102	0.15	+0.05	0	±0
Citizens of Burgos for Old Castile (CiBu)	2,001	0.14	+0.06	0	±0
Regionalist Party of the Leonese Country (PREPAL)	1,965	0.14	+0.03	0	±0
Greens and Castilians (LV–PCAL)^{4}	1,553	0.11	−0.06	0	±0
Civiqus (Civiqus)	1,527	0.11	New	0	±0
Spanish Phalanx of the CNSO (FE de las JONS)	1,522	0.11	+0.03	0	±0
Regionalist Unity of Castile and León (URCL)	1,428	0.10	+0.04	0	±0
Internationalist Solidarity and Self-Management (SAIn)	1,302	0.09	New	0	±0
Communist Party of the Castilian People (PCPC)	1,254	0.09	+0.02	0	±0
Independents for San Andrés (IxSA)	859	0.06	New	0	±0
Merindades of Castile Initiative (IMC)	854	0.06	New	0	±0
Left Segovia (SdI)	760	0.05	New	0	±0
Regionalist Party of El Bierzo (PRB)	657	0.05	−0.02	0	±0
Humanist Party (PH)	529	0.04	+0.01	0	±0
Communist Unification of Spain (UCE)	492	0.03	New	0	±0
Family and Life Party (PFyV)	238	0.02	New	0	±0
Blank ballots	47,008	3.28	+1.30		
Total	1,434,412			84	+1
Valid votes	1,434,412	98.09	−1.11		
Invalid votes	27,985	1.91	+1.11		
Votes cast / turnout	1,462,397	67.50	−3.20		
Abstentions	703,988	32.50	+3.20		
Registered voters	2,166,385				
Sources
Footnotes: ^{1} Party of Castile and León results are compared to Commoners' Land–Alternative for Castile and León totals in the 2007 election.; ^{2} Party of Castile and León and Greens of Salamanca do not include results in Segovia.; ^{3} Yes for Salamanca results are compared to Union of the Salamancan People totals in the 2007 election.; ^{4} Greens and Castilians results are compared to the combined totals of The Greens and Commoners' Land–Alternative for Castile and León in Segovia in the 2007 election.

Popular vote
PP	51.55%
PSOE	29.68%
IUCyL	4.87%
UPyD	3.28%
UPL	1.86%
Others	5.48%
Blank ballots	3.28%

Seats
PP	63.10%
PSOE	34.52%
IUCyL	1.19%
UPL	1.19%

=== Distribution by constituency ===
Constituency	PP		PSOE		IUCyL		UPL	
Constituency	%	S	%	S	%	S	%	S
Ávila	59.1	5	23.7	2	5.3	−		
Burgos	50.7	7	27.2	4	4.5	−		
León	44.7	8	31.8	5	3.8	−	8.9	1
Palencia	53.0	4	32.8	3	4.4	−		
Salamanca	56.7	7	29.2	4	3.2	−		
Segovia	54.3	5	31.5	2	4.3	−		
Soria	52.0	3	32.9	2	3.1	−		
Valladolid	50.2	9	29.1	5	7.8	1		
Zamora	54.0	5	30.7	2	4.6	−	1.2	−
Total	51.6	53	29.7	29	4.9	1	1.9	1

== Aftermath ==
=== Government formation ===
Investiture; Nomination of Juan Vicente Herrera (PP)
Ballot →	23 June 2011
Required majority →	43 out of 84
Yes: • PP (53)	53 / 84
No: • PSOE (29); • IU (1); • UPL (1)	31 / 84
Abstentions	0 / 84
Absentees	0 / 84

== Bibliography ==
- Ley Orgánica 5/1985, de 19 de junio, del Régimen Electoral General (Organic Law 5/1985). Official State Gazette (in Spanish). 19 June 1985 [version as of 30 April 2011]. BOE-A-1985-11672.
- Ley 3/1987, de 30 de marzo, Electoral de Castilla y León (Law 3/1987). Official State Gazette (in Spanish). 30 March 1987 [version as of 30 December 1998]. BOE-A-1987-9475.
- Ley 3/2001, de 3 de julio, del Gobierno y de la Administración de la Comunidad de Castilla y León (Law 3/2001). Official State Gazette (in Spanish). 3 July 2001 [version as of 11 March 2011]. BOE-A-2001-14243.
- Ley Orgánica 14/2007, de 30 de noviembre, de reforma del Estatuto de Autonomía de Castilla y León (Organic Law 14/2007). Official State Gazette (in Spanish). 30 November 2007 [version as of 11 April 2011]. BOE-A-2007-20635.
- Decreto 1/2011, de 28 de marzo, del Presidente de la Junta de Castilla y León, por el que se convocan elecciones a las Cortes de Castilla y León (PDF) (Decree 1/2011). Official Gazette of Castile and León (in Spanish). 28 March 2011. BOCYL-D-29032011-1.
