= 1991 Spanish local elections in Castile and León =

This article presents the results breakdown of the local elections held in Castile and León on 26 May 1991. The following tables show detailed results in the autonomous community's most populous municipalities, sorted alphabetically.

== City control ==
The following table lists party control in the most populous municipalities, including provincial capitals (highlighted in bold). Gains for a party are highlighted in that party's colour.

Municipality	Population	Previous control	New control
**Ávila**	46,992	Democratic and Social Centre (CDS)	People's Party (PP)
**Burgos**	163,507	People's Party (PP)	People's Party (PP)
**León**	137,758	People's Party (PP)	People's Party (PP)
**Palencia**	77,464	People's Party (PP)	Spanish Socialist Workers' Party (PSOE)
Ponferrada	60,401	Spanish Socialist Workers' Party (PSOE)	Spanish Socialist Workers' Party (PSOE)
**Salamanca**	162,037	People's Party (PP)	Spanish Socialist Workers' Party (PSOE)
**Segovia**	55,188	Democratic and Social Centre (CDS)	People's Party (PP)
**Soria**	32,609	People's Party (PP)	People's Party (PP)
**Valladolid**	333,680	Spanish Socialist Workers' Party (PSOE)	Spanish Socialist Workers' Party (PSOE)
**Zamora**	63,436	People's Party (PP)	Spanish Socialist Workers' Party (PSOE)

== Municipalities ==
=== Ávila ===
Population: 46,992

← Summary of the 26 May 1991 City Council of Ávila election results →
Parties and alliances	Popular vote			Seats	
Parties and alliances	Votes	%	±pp	Total	+/−
People's Party (PP)^{1}	9,763	46.67	+17.34	11	+5
Democratic and Social Centre (CDS)	4,358	20.83	−26.84	5	−6
Spanish Socialist Workers' Party (PSOE)	3,823	18.28	+2.70	4	+1
United Left (IU)	1,577	7.54	+2.12	1	±0
The Greens (LV)	995	4.76	New	0	±0
Blank ballots	403	1.93	+0.16		
Total	20,919			21	±0
Valid votes	20,919	99.16	+0.90		
Invalid votes	177	0.84	−0.90		
Votes cast / turnout	21,096	60.72	−12.14		
Abstentions	13,646	39.28	+12.14		
Registered voters	34,742				
Sources
Footnotes: ^{1} People's Party results are compared to the combined totals of People's Alliance, People's Democratic Party and Liberal Party in the 1987 election.

=== Burgos ===
Population: 163,507

← Summary of the 26 May 1991 City Council of Burgos election results →
Parties and alliances	Popular vote			Seats	
Parties and alliances	Votes	%	±pp	Total	+/−
People's Party (PP)^{1}	33,438	42.33	−12.57	14	−3
Spanish Socialist Workers' Party (PSOE)	25,541	32.33	+4.46	11	+3
United Left (IU)	5,966	7.55	+2.66	2	+2
Democratic and Social Centre (CDS)	3,397	4.30	−5.09	0	−2
Burgalese Popular Action (APB)	3,289	4.16	New	0	±0
Independent Burgalese University Students (UBI)	3,193	4.04	New	0	±0
Castilian Regionalist Party (PREC)	1,167	1.48	New	0	±0
The Greens (LV)	1,066	1.35	New	0	±0
Commoners' Land (TC)	485	0.61	New	0	±0
Blank ballots	1,450	1.84	−0.13		
Total	78,992			27	±0
Valid votes	78,992	99.20	+0.76		
Invalid votes	638	0.80	−0.76		
Votes cast / turnout	79,630	63.56	−8.30		
Abstentions	45,658	36.44	+8.30		
Registered voters	125,288				
Sources
Footnotes: ^{1} People's Party results are compared to the combined totals of Independent Solution and People's Democratic Party in the 1987 election.

=== León ===
Population: 137,758

← Summary of the 26 May 1991 City Council of León election results →
Parties and alliances	Popular vote			Seats	
Parties and alliances	Votes	%	±pp	Total	+/−
People's Party (PP)^{1}	24,944	40.61	−14.40	13	−3
Spanish Socialist Workers' Party (PSOE)	18,857	30.70	+0.79	10	+1
Leonese People's Union (UPL)	6,236	10.15	+8.17	3	+3
United Left (IU)	3,168	5.16	+1.95	1	+1
Democratic and Social Centre (CDS)	2,799	4.56	−3.39	0	−2
Independent Progressive Union (UPI)	2,540	4.13	New	0	±0
The Greens (LV)	1,024	1.67	New	0	±0
Falangist Movement of Spain (MFE)	228	0.37	New	0	±0
Blank ballots	1,631	2.66	+1.32		
Total	61,427			27	±0
Valid votes	61,427	99.01	+0.43		
Invalid votes	616	0.99	−0.43		
Votes cast / turnout	62,043	58.51	−11.96		
Abstentions	43,999	41.49	+11.96		
Registered voters	106,042				
Sources
Footnotes: ^{1} People's Party results are compared to the combined totals of Independents of León, People's Alliance, People's Democratic Party and Liberal Party in the 1987 election.

=== Palencia ===
Population: 77,464

← Summary of the 26 May 1991 City Council of Palencia election results →
Parties and alliances	Popular vote			Seats	
Parties and alliances	Votes	%	±pp	Total	+/−
Spanish Socialist Workers' Party (PSOE)	14,145	39.24	+4.52	11	+2
People's Party (PP)^{1}	12,567	34.86	−6.49	10	−1
People's Palentine Group (APP)	3,368	9.34	New	2	+2
United Left (IU)	2,506	6.95	−2.00	1	−1
Democratic and Social Centre (CDS)	1,885	5.23	−8.66	1	−2
Palentine Unity (UP)	891	2.47	New	0	±0
Blank ballots	683	1.89	+1.89		
Total	36,045			25	±0
Valid votes	36,045	99.10	+0.91		
Invalid votes	328	0.90	−0.91		
Votes cast / turnout	36,373	62.28	−9.16		
Abstentions	22,026	37.72	+9.16		
Registered voters	58,399				
Sources
Footnotes: ^{1} People's Party results are compared to People's Alliance totals in the 1987 election.

=== Ponferrada ===
Population: 60,401

← Summary of the 26 May 1991 City Council of Ponferrada election results →
Parties and alliances	Popular vote			Seats	
Parties and alliances	Votes	%	±pp	Total	+/−
Spanish Socialist Workers' Party (PSOE)	10,542	40.52	−4.36	11	−2
People's Party (PP)^{1}	8,429	32.40	+5.37	9	+3
Party of El Bierzo (PB)	2,390	9.19	−3.34	2	−1
Democratic and Social Centre (CDS)	1,779	6.84	−3.33	2	−1
United Left (IU)	1,321	5.08	+0.74	1	+1
Bercian Left (IB)	809	3.11	New	0	±0
The Greens (LV)	260	1.00	New	0	±0
Independent Progressive Union (UPI)	186	0.71	New	0	±0
Blank ballots	298	1.15	+0.10		
Total	26,014			25	±0
Valid votes	26,014	99.35	+0.92		
Invalid votes	171	0.65	−0.92		
Votes cast / turnout	26,185	56.82	−7.39		
Abstentions	19,903	43.18	+7.39		
Registered voters	46,088				
Sources
Footnotes: ^{1} People's Party results are compared to the combined totals of People's Alliance and People's Democratic Party in the 1987 election.

=== Salamanca ===
Population: 162,037

← Summary of the 26 May 1991 City Council of Salamanca election results →
Parties and alliances	Popular vote			Seats	
Parties and alliances	Votes	%	±pp	Total	+/−
People's Party (PP)^{1}	34,375	43.70	+7.59	13	+3
Spanish Socialist Workers' Party (PSOE)	31,426	39.95	+6.47	12	+2
Democratic and Social Centre (CDS)	4,650	5.91	−16.53	1	−6
United Left (IU)	4,081	5.19	+1.38	1	+1
The Greens (LV)	2,154	2.74	+1.47	0	±0
Regionalist Party of the Leonese Country (PREPAL)	315	0.40	+0.09	0	±0
Regionalist Democracy of Castile and León (DRCL)	300	0.38	New	0	±0
Blank ballots	1,365	1.74	+0.28		
Total	78,666			27	±0
Valid votes	78,666	99.29	+0.94		
Invalid votes	562	0.71	−0.94		
Votes cast / turnout	79,228	62.10	−12.09		
Abstentions	48,352	37.90	+12.09		
Registered voters	127,580				
Sources
Footnotes: ^{1} People's Party results are compared to the combined totals of People's Alliance, Liberal Party and People's Democratic Party in the 1987 election.

=== Segovia ===
Population: 55,188

← Summary of the 26 May 1991 City Council of Segovia election results →
Parties and alliances	Popular vote			Seats	
Parties and alliances	Votes	%	±pp	Total	+/−
People's Party (PP)^{1}	10,163	40.91	+7.97	11	+3
Spanish Socialist Workers' Party (PSOE)	7,834	31.53	+2.38	9	+1
Democratic and Social Centre (CDS)	2,671	10.75	−14.76	3	−4
United Left (IU)	2,600	10.47	+0.63	2	±0
The Greens (LV)	506	2.04	New	0	±0
Castilian Regionalist Party (PREC)	457	1.84	New	0	±0
Blank ballots	612	2.46	+0.33		
Total	24,843			25	±0
Valid votes	24,843	98.72	+0.37		
Invalid votes	323	1.28	−0.37		
Votes cast / turnout	25,166	59.85	−10.96		
Abstentions	16,879	40.15	+10.96		
Registered voters	42,045				
Sources
Footnotes: ^{1} People's Party results are compared to the combined totals of People's Alliance and People's Democratic Party in the 1987 election.

=== Soria ===
Population: 32,609

← Summary of the 26 May 1991 City Council of Soria election results →
Parties and alliances	Popular vote			Seats	
Parties and alliances	Votes	%	±pp	Total	+/−
People's Party (PP)^{1}	6,485	48.74	+5.04	12	+2
Spanish Socialist Workers' Party (PSOE)	4,361	32.78	+1.87	8	±0
Democratic and Social Centre (CDS)	902	6.78	−4.78	1	−2
Castilianist Union (UC)	503	3.78	New	0	±0
United Left (IU)	389	2.92	−0.96	0	±0
Nationalist Party of Castile and León (PANCAL)	195	1.47	+1.08	0	±0
Commoners' Land (TC)	90	0.68	New	0	±0
Blank ballots	380	2.86	+0.57		
Total	13,305			21	±0
Valid votes	13,305	99.21	+3.02		
Invalid votes	106	0.79	−3.02		
Votes cast / turnout	13,411	52.90	−15.03		
Abstentions	11,941	47.10	+15.03		
Registered voters	25,352				
Sources
Footnotes: ^{1} People's Party results are compared to the combined totals of People's Alliance and People's Democratic Party in the 1987 election.

=== Valladolid ===
Population: 333,680

← Summary of the 26 May 1991 City Council of Valladolid election results →
Parties and alliances	Popular vote			Seats	
Parties and alliances	Votes	%	±pp	Total	+/−
People's Party (PP)^{1}	62,432	40.74	+11.34	13	+4
Spanish Socialist Workers' Party (PSOE)	58,204	37.98	+2.51	12	±0
United Left (IU)	16,192	10.57	+4.90	3	+2
Democratic and Social Centre (CDS)	8,108	5.29	−18.14	1	−6
The Greens (LV)	2,263	1.48	New	0	±0
Regionalist Democracy of Castile and León (DRCL)	1,374	0.90	New	0	±0
The Greens Ecologist–Humanist List (LVLE–H)^{2}	1,125	0.73	+0.37	0	±0
Spanish Phalanx of the CNSO (FE–JONS)	408	0.27	−0.03	0	±0
Left Unitary Platform (PCE (m–l)–CRPE)	273	0.18	New	0	±0
Blank ballots	2,870	1.87	+0.46		
Total	153,249			29	±0
Valid votes	153,249	99.12	+0.79		
Invalid votes	1,353	0.88	−0.79		
Votes cast / turnout	154,602	60.11	−11.30		
Abstentions	102,591	39.89	+11.30		
Registered voters	257,193				
Sources
Footnotes: ^{1} People's Party results are compared to the combined totals of People's Alliance and People's Democratic Party in the 1987 election.; ^{2} The Greens Ecologist–Humanist List results are compared to Humanist Platform totals in the 1987 election.

=== Zamora ===
Population: 63,436

← Summary of the 26 May 1991 City Council of Zamora election results →
Parties and alliances	Popular vote			Seats	
Parties and alliances	Votes	%	±pp	Total	+/−
Spanish Socialist Workers' Party (PSOE)	11,534	42.09	+5.31	12	+2
People's Party (PP)^{1}	11,397	41.59	+0.79	11	±0
Democratic and Social Centre (CDS)	1,790	6.53	−8.04	1	−3
United Left (IU)	1,714	6.26	+1.50	1	+1
Regionalist Party of the Leonese Country (PREPAL)	344	1.26	+0.31	0	±0
Blank ballots	622	2.27	+0.80		
Total	27,401			25	±0
Valid votes	27,401	98.73	+1.82		
Invalid votes	352	1.27	−1.82		
Votes cast / turnout	27,753	56.40	−11.73		
Abstentions	21,452	43.60	+11.73		
Registered voters	49,205				
Sources
Footnotes: ^{1} People's Party results are compared to the combined totals of People's Alliance, People's Democratic Party and Independent Solution in the 1987 election.

== See also ==
- 1991 Castilian-Leonese regional election
