= 1983 Spanish local elections in Castile and León =

This article presents the results breakdown of the local elections held in Castile and León on 8 May 1983. The following tables show detailed results in the autonomous community's most populous municipalities, sorted alphabetically.

== City control ==
The following table lists party control in the most populous municipalities, including provincial capitals (highlighted in bold). Gains for a party are highlighted in that party's colour.

Municipality	Population	Previous control	New control
**Ávila**	40,173	Union of the Democratic Centre (UCD)	People's Coalition (AP–PDP–UL)
**Burgos**	152,545	Union of the Democratic Centre (UCD)	People's Coalition (AP–PDP–UL) (SI in 1987)
**León**	127,095	Union of the Democratic Centre (UCD)	Independents of León (IL)
**Palencia**	71,716	Union of the Democratic Centre (UCD)	People's Coalition (AP–PDP–UL)
Ponferrada	53,763	Spanish Socialist Workers' Party (PSOE)	Spanish Socialist Workers' Party (PSOE)
**Salamanca**	153,981	Spanish Socialist Workers' Party (PSOE)	Spanish Socialist Workers' Party (PSOE)
**Segovia**	50,759	Union of the Democratic Centre (UCD)	Spanish Socialist Workers' Party (PSOE) (PDP in 1986)
**Soria**	30,326	Union of the Democratic Centre (UCD)	People's Coalition (AP–PDP–UL)
**Valladolid**	320,293	Spanish Socialist Workers' Party (PSOE)	Spanish Socialist Workers' Party (PSOE)
**Zamora**	58,560	Union of the Democratic Centre (UCD)	Spanish Socialist Workers' Party (PSOE)

== Municipalities ==
=== Ávila ===
Population: 40,173

← Summary of the 8 May 1983 City Council of Ávila election results →
Parties and alliances	Popular vote			Seats	
Parties and alliances	Votes	%	±pp	Total	+/−
People's Coalition (AP–PDP–UL)	7,845	40.15	New	9	+9
Spanish Socialist Workers' Party (PSOE)	6,312	32.30	+9.24	7	+2
Democratic and Social Centre (CDS)	4,417	22.61	New	5	+5
Communist Party of Spain (PCE)	719	3.68	−2.31	0	−1
Independent Group (AI)	246	1.26	New	0	±0
Union of the Democratic Centre (UCD)	n/a	n/a	−67.95	0	−15
Blank ballots	0	0.00	−1.22		
Total	19,539			21	±0
Valid votes	19,539	100.00	+1.46		
Invalid votes	0	0.00	−1.46		
Votes cast / turnout	19,539	64.98	+2.22		
Abstentions	10,529	35.02	−2.22		
Registered voters	30,068				

=== Burgos ===
Population: 152,545

← Summary of the 8 May 1983 City Council of Burgos election results →
Parties and alliances	Popular vote			Seats	
Parties and alliances	Votes	%	±pp	Total	+/−
People's Coalition (AP–PDP–UL)^{1}	43,407	59.28	+49.44	18	+15
Spanish Socialist Workers' Party (PSOE)	22,228	30.36	+4.92	9	+1
Communist Party of Spain (PCE)	2,200	3.00	−4.27	0	−2
Everyone United Electoral Grouping (Todos Unidos)^{2}	2,115	2.89	+1.28	0	±0
Democratic and Social Centre (CDS)	1,789	2.44	New	0	±0
Liberal Democratic Party (PDL)	1,485	2.03	New	0	±0
Union of the Democratic Centre (UCD)	n/a	n/a	−38.82	0	−12
Democratic Independent Candidacy (CID)	n/a	n/a	−7.10	0	−12
Blank ballots	0	0.00	±0.00		
Total	73,224			27	±0
Valid votes	73,224	100.00	+7.68		
Invalid votes	0	0.00	−7.68		
Votes cast / turnout	73,224	64.75	+1.04		
Abstentions	39,868	35.25	−1.04		
Registered voters	113,092				
Sources
Footnotes: ^{1} People's Coalition results are compared to Democratic Coalition totals in the 1979 election.; ^{2} Everyone United Electoral Grouping results are compared to Communist Movement–Organization of Communist Left totals in the 1979 election.

=== León ===
Population: 127,095

← Summary of the 8 May 1983 City Council of León election results →
Parties and alliances	Popular vote			Seats	
Parties and alliances	Votes	%	±pp	Total	+/−
Spanish Socialist Workers' Party (PSOE)	23,912	37.87	+4.67	11	+1
Independents of León (IL)	23,596	37.37	New	11	+11
People's Coalition (AP–PDP–UL)^{1}	12,324	19.52	+6.28	5	+2
Communist Party of Spain (PCE)	1,686	2.67	−11.05	0	−4
Regionalist Party of the Leonese Country (PREPAL)	987	1.56	New	0	±0
Democratic and Social Centre (CDS)	645	1.02	New	0	±0
Union of the Democratic Centre (UCD)	n/a	n/a	−34.57	0	−10
Blank ballots	0	0.00	±0.00		
Total	63,150			27	±0
Valid votes	63,150	100.00	+1.90		
Invalid votes	0	0.00	−1.90		
Votes cast / turnout	63,150	66.16	+7.59		
Abstentions	32,296	33.84	−7.59		
Registered voters	95,446				
Sources
Footnotes: ^{1} People's Coalition results are compared to Democratic Coalition totals in the 1979 election.

=== Palencia ===
Population: 71,716

← Summary of the 8 May 1983 City Council of Palencia election results →
Parties and alliances	Popular vote			Seats	
Parties and alliances	Votes	%	±pp	Total	+/−
People's Coalition (AP–PDP–UL)^{1}	18,617	50.55	+41.78	14	+12
Spanish Socialist Workers' Party (PSOE)	14,584	39.60	+6.11	10	+1
Communist Party of Spain (PCE)	2,524	6.85	−4.46	1	−2
Democratic and Social Centre (CDS)	1,105	3.00	New	0	±0
Union of the Democratic Centre (UCD)	n/a	n/a	−40.50	0	−11
Blank ballots	0	0.00	±0.00		
Total	36,830			25	±0
Valid votes	36,830	100.00	+1.47		
Invalid votes	0	0.00	−1.47		
Votes cast / turnout	36,830	71.18	+10.32		
Abstentions	14,911	28.82	−10.32		
Registered voters	51,741				
Sources
Footnotes: ^{1} People's Coalition results are compared to Democratic Coalition totals in the 1979 election.

=== Ponferrada ===
Population: 53,763

← Summary of the 8 May 1983 City Council of Ponferrada election results →
Parties and alliances	Popular vote			Seats	
Parties and alliances	Votes	%	±pp	Total	+/−
Spanish Socialist Workers' Party (PSOE)	16,647	67.41	+38.25	20	+12
People's Coalition (AP–PDP–UL)^{1}	4,686	18.98	+15.36	5	+5
Party of El Bierzo (PB)	1,061	4.30	New	0	±0
Liberal Democratic Party (PDL)	1,040	4.21	New	0	±0
Communist Party of Spain (PCE)	924	3.74	−6.41	0	−2
Democratic and Social Centre (CDS)	336	1.36	New	0	±0
Union of the Democratic Centre (UCD)	n/a	n/a	−27.27	0	−8
Independent Neighbours Association (AVI)	n/a	n/a	−17.97	0	−5
Bierzo Independents (IB)	n/a	n/a	−8.53	0	−2
Blank ballots	0	0.00	±0.00		
Total	24,694			25	±0
Valid votes	24,694	100.00	+0.98		
Invalid votes	0	0.00	−0.98		
Votes cast / turnout	24,694	60.46	+5.45		
Abstentions	16,152	39.54	−5.45		
Registered voters	40,846				
Sources
Footnotes: ^{1} People's Coalition results are compared to Democratic Coalition totals in the 1979 election.

=== Salamanca ===
Population: 153,981

← Summary of the 8 May 1983 City Council of Salamanca election results →
Parties and alliances	Popular vote			Seats	
Parties and alliances	Votes	%	±pp	Total	+/−
Spanish Socialist Workers' Party (PSOE)	45,573	56.67	+20.57	17	+6
People's Coalition (AP–PDP–UL)^{1}	27,470	34.16	+29.64	10	+10
Democratic and Social Centre (CDS)	3,648	4.54	New	0	±0
Communist Party of Spain (PCE)	2,215	2.75	−8.86	0	−3
Independents (INDEP)	1,520	1.89	New	0	±0
Union of the Democratic Centre (UCD)	n/a	n/a	−43.96	0	−13
Blank ballots	0	0.00	±0.00		
Total	80,423			27	±0
Valid votes	80,423	100.00	+1.41		
Invalid votes	0	0.00	−1.41		
Votes cast / turnout	80,423	70.72	+9.72		
Abstentions	33,302	29.28	−9.72		
Registered voters	113,725				
Sources
Footnotes: ^{1} People's Coalition results are compared to Democratic Coalition totals in the 1979 election.

=== Segovia ===
Population: 50,759

← Summary of the 8 May 1983 City Council of Segovia election results →
Parties and alliances	Popular vote			Seats	
Parties and alliances	Votes	%	±pp	Total	+/−
Spanish Socialist Workers' Party (PSOE)	9,368	37.45	+4.62	10	+3
People's Coalition (AP–PDP–UL)	8,889	35.53	New	10	+10
Democratic and Social Centre (CDS)	2,210	8.83	New	2	+2
Independents (INDEP)	2,115	8.45	New	2	+2
Liberal Democratic Party (PDL)	1,409	5.63	New	1	+1
Communist Party of Spain (PCE)	1,024	4.09	−3.27	0	−1
Union of the Democratic Centre (UCD)	n/a	n/a	−57.46	0	−13
Blank ballots	0	0.00	±0.00		
Total	25,015			25	+4
Valid votes	25,015	100.00	+3.89		
Invalid votes	0	0.00	−3.89		
Votes cast / turnout	25,015	66.82	+1.76		
Abstentions	12,421	33.18	−1.76		
Registered voters	37,436				

=== Soria ===
Population: 30,326

← Summary of the 8 May 1983 City Council of Soria election results →
Parties and alliances	Popular vote			Seats	
Parties and alliances	Votes	%	±pp	Total	+/−
People's Coalition (AP–PDP–UL)^{1}	6,854	54.57	+39.72	12	+9
Spanish Socialist Workers' Party (PSOE)	5,707	45.43	+19.05	9	+3
Union of the Democratic Centre (UCD)	n/a	n/a	−34.67	0	−8
Communist Party of Spain (PCE)	n/a	n/a	−6.15	1	−1
Independent Electoral Group (AEI)	n/a	n/a	−6.00	1	−1
Citizen Movement of Soria (MCS)	n/a	n/a	−5.78	1	−1
Sorian Independent Group (GIS)	n/a	n/a	−5.19	0	−1
Blank ballots	0	0.00	±0.00		
Total	12,561			21	±0
Valid votes	12,561	100.00	+2.48		
Invalid votes	0	0.00	−2.48		
Votes cast / turnout	12,561	55.16	−2.08		
Abstentions	10,210	44.84	+2.08		
Registered voters	22,771				
Sources
Footnotes: ^{1} People's Coalition results are compared to Democratic Coalition totals in the 1979 election.

=== Valladolid ===
Population: 320,293

← Summary of the 8 May 1983 City Council of Valladolid election results →
Parties and alliances	Popular vote			Seats	
Parties and alliances	Votes	%	±pp	Total	+/−
Spanish Socialist Workers' Party (PSOE)	89,944	58.61	+18.80	19	+6
People's Coalition (AP–PDP–UL)^{1}	47,013	30.64	+25.47	9	+8
Communist Party of Spain (PCE)	8,419	5.49	−7.57	1	−3
Democratic and Social Centre (CDS)	6,482	4.22	New	0	±0
Agrarian Bloc–Spanish Ruralist Party (BAR–PRE)	806	0.53	New	0	±0
UP–PR–INDEP (UP–PR–INDEP)	791	0.52	New	0	±0
Union of the Democratic Centre (UCD)	n/a	n/a	−27.89	0	−9
Independents (INDEP)	n/a	n/a	−7.62	0	−2
Blank ballots	0	0.00	±0.00		
Total	153,455			29	±0
Valid votes	153,455	100.00	+2.18		
Invalid votes	0	0.00	−2.18		
Votes cast / turnout	153,455	64.55	+6.83		
Abstentions	84,286	35.45	−6.83		
Registered voters	237,741				
Sources
Footnotes: ^{1} People's Coalition results are compared to Democratic Coalition totals in the 1979 election.

=== Zamora ===
Population: 58,560

← Summary of the 8 May 1983 City Council of Zamora election results →
Parties and alliances	Popular vote			Seats	
Parties and alliances	Votes	%	±pp	Total	+/−
Spanish Socialist Workers' Party (PSOE)	12,815	47.09	+14.32	13	+4
People's Coalition (AP–PDP–UL)^{1}	10,613	39.00	+26.17	11	+8
Democratic and Social Centre (CDS)	1,596	5.87	New	1	+1
Liberal Democratic Party (PDL)	794	2.92	New	0	±0
Communist Party of Spain (PCE)	735	2.70	New	0	±0
Regionalist Party of the Leonese Country (PREPAL)	659	2.42	New	0	±0
Union of the Democratic Centre (UCD)	n/a	n/a	−37.64	0	−11
Independent Zamorans Union (UZI)	n/a	n/a	−8.86	0	−2
Blank ballots	0	0.00	±0.00		
Total	27,212			25	±0
Valid votes	27,212	100.00	+3.71		
Invalid votes	0	0.00	−3.71		
Votes cast / turnout	27,212	60.53	+9.10		
Abstentions	17,743	39.47	−9.10		
Registered voters	44,955				
Sources
Footnotes: ^{1} People's Coalition results are compared to Democratic Coalition totals in the 1979 election.

== See also ==
- 1983 Castilian-Leonese regional election
