= 2007 Spanish local elections in Castile and León =

This article presents the results breakdown of the local elections held in Castile and León on 27 May 2007. The following tables show detailed results in the autonomous community's most populous municipalities, sorted alphabetically.

== City control ==
The following table lists party control in the most populous municipalities, including provincial capitals (shown in bold). Gains for a party are displayed with the cell's background shaded in that party's colour.

Municipality	Population	Previous control	New control
**Ávila**	53,272	People's Party (PP)	People's Party (PP)
**Burgos**	173,676	People's Party (PP)	People's Party (PP)
**León**	136,985	People's Party (PP)	Spanish Socialist Workers' Party (PSOE)
**Palencia**	82,263	Spanish Socialist Workers' Party (PSOE)	Spanish Socialist Workers' Party (PSOE)
Ponferrada	66,656	People's Party (PP)	People's Party (PP)
**Salamanca**	159,754	People's Party (PP)	People's Party (PP)
**Segovia**	55,476	Spanish Socialist Workers' Party (PSOE)	Spanish Socialist Workers' Party (PSOE)
**Soria**	38,004	People's Party (PP)	Spanish Socialist Workers' Party (PSOE)
**Valladolid**	319,943	People's Party (PP)	People's Party (PP)
**Zamora**	66,135	People's Party (PP)	People's Party (PP)

== Municipalities ==
=== Ávila ===
Population: 53,272

← Summary of the 27 May 2007 City Council of Ávila election results →
Parties and alliances	Popular vote			Seats	
Parties and alliances	Votes	%	±pp	Total	+/−
People's Party (PP)	16,996	60.14	+3.17	16	+1
Spanish Socialist Workers' Party (PSOE)	7,566	26.77	+1.27	7	±0
United Left–The Greens–Commitment for Castile and León (IU–LV–CyL)	2,656	9.40	−1.79	2	−1
Commoners' Land–Alternative for Castile and León (TC–ACAL)	330	1.17	−0.33	0	±0
Blank ballots	714	2.53	−0.68		
Total	28,262			25	±0
Valid votes	28,262	98.94	+0.04		
Invalid votes	302	1.06	−0.04		
Votes cast / turnout	28,564	65.53	−4.26		
Abstentions	15,022	34.47	+4.26		
Registered voters	43,586				

=== Burgos ===
Population: 173,676

← Summary of the 27 May 2007 City Council of Burgos election results →
Parties and alliances	Popular vote			Seats	
Parties and alliances	Votes	%	±pp	Total	+/−
People's Party (PP)	44,383	47.74	+3.60	15	+1
Spanish Socialist Workers' Party (PSOE)	31,802	34.21	+0.08	10	±0
Independent Solution (SI)	6,009	6.46	−2.37	2	±0
United Left–The Greens–Commitment for Castile and León (IU–LV–CyL)	4,292	4.62	−0.47	0	−1
Commoners' Land–Alternative for Castile and León (TC–ACAL)	1,801	1.94	−0.93	0	±0
Citizens of Burgos (CiBu)	851	0.92	New	0	±0
The Greens (LV)	663	0.71	New	0	±0
National Democracy (DN)	477	0.51	New	0	±0
Citizens' Group (AGRUCI)	327	0.35	New	0	±0
Republican Left (IR)	157	0.17	New	0	±0
Blank ballots	2,197	2.36	−0.88		
Total	92,959			27	±0
Valid votes	92,959	99.39	+0.07		
Invalid votes	574	0.61	−0.07		
Votes cast / turnout	93,533	67.31	−3.44		
Abstentions	45,427	32.69	+3.44		
Registered voters	138,960				

=== León ===
Population: 136,985

← Summary of the 27 May 2007 City Council of León election results →
Parties and alliances	Popular vote			Seats	
Parties and alliances	Votes	%	±pp	Total	+/−
Spanish Socialist Workers' Party (PSOE)	32,292	44.17	+9.93	13	+3
People's Party (PP)	27,472	37.57	−0.93	11	−1
Leonese People's Union (UPL)	7,925	10.84	−8.40	3	−2
Leonese Autonomist Party–Leonesist Unity (PAL–UL)	1,735	2.37	New	0	±0
United Left–The Greens–Commitment for Castile and León (IU–LV–CyL)	1,035	1.42	−1.17	0	±0
The Greens of Europe (LVE)	329	0.45	New	0	±0
Anti-Bullfighting Party Against Mistreatment of Animals (PACMA)	171	0.23	New	0	±0
Regionalist Party of the Leonese Country (PREPAL)	123	0.17	+0.07	0	±0
Republican Left (IR)	112	0.15	−0.07	0	±0
Progress Party of Castile and León Cities (PPCCAL)	87	0.12	New	0	±0
The Phalanx (FE)	85	0.12	±0.00	0	±0
Spanish Phalanx of the CNSO (FE de las JONS)^{1}	70	0.10	+0.04	0	±0
National Democracy (DN)	37	0.05	New	0	±0
Party of El Bierzo (PB)	29	0.04	New	0	±0
Blank ballots	1,612	2.20	−0.15		
Total	73,114			27	±0
Valid votes	73,114	99.28	−0.07		
Invalid votes	532	0.72	+0.07		
Votes cast / turnout	73,646	63.07	−2.25		
Abstentions	43,118	36.93	+2.25		
Registered voters	116,764				
Sources
Footnotes: ^{1} Spanish Phalanx of the CNSO results are compared to Independent Spanish Phalanx–Phalanx 2000 totals in the 2003 election.

=== Palencia ===
Population: 82,263

← Summary of the 27 May 2007 City Council of Palencia election results →
Parties and alliances	Popular vote			Seats	
Parties and alliances	Votes	%	±pp	Total	+/−
Spanish Socialist Workers' Party (PSOE)	21,960	48.05	−1.30	13	±0
People's Party (PP)	18,445	40.36	+1.17	11	±0
United Left–The Greens–Commitment for Castile and León (IU–LV–CyL)	2,367	5.18	+0.03	1	±0
Independent Candidacy–The Party of Castile and León (CI–PCL)	1,154	2.53	New	0	±0
Commoners' Land–Alternative for Castile and León (TC–ACAL)	647	1.42	−0.34	0	±0
Spanish Phalanx of the CNSO (FE de las JONS)^{1}	169	0.37	+0.18	0	±0
Blank ballots	958	2.10	−0.43		
Total	45,700			25	±0
Valid votes	45,700	99.23	−0.03		
Invalid votes	353	0.77	+0.03		
Votes cast / turnout	46,053	66.54	−2.44		
Abstentions	23,154	33.46	+2.44		
Registered voters	69,207				
Sources
Footnotes: ^{1} Spanish Phalanx of the CNSO results are compared to Independent Spanish Phalanx–Phalanx 2000 totals in the 2003 election.

=== Ponferrada ===
Population: 66,656

← Summary of the 27 May 2007 City Council of Ponferrada election results →
Parties and alliances	Popular vote			Seats	
Parties and alliances	Votes	%	±pp	Total	+/−
People's Party (PP)	17,216	49.16	+0.66	14	−1
Spanish Socialist Workers' Party (PSOE)	10,426	29.77	−3.18	9	−1
Social Alternative Movement–Leonese People's Union (MASS–UPL)^{1}	2,340	6.68	+2.57	2	+2
United Left–The Greens (IU–LV)	1,749	4.99	+0.95	0	±0
Party of El Bierzo (PB)	1,642	4.69	+0.01	0	±0
Regionalist Party of El Bierzo (PRB)	1,032	2.95	+0.49	0	±0
Blank ballots	618	1.76	+0.18		
Total	35,023			25	±0
Valid votes	35,023	99.38	−0.07		
Invalid votes	217	0.62	+0.07		
Votes cast / turnout	35,240	65.51	−2.57		
Abstentions	18,552	34.49	+2.57		
Registered voters	53,792				
Sources
Footnotes: ^{1} Social Alternative Movement–Leonese People's Union results are compared to Leonese People's Union totals in the 2003 election.

=== Salamanca ===
Population: 159,754

← Summary of the 27 May 2007 City Council of Salamanca election results →
Parties and alliances	Popular vote			Seats	
Parties and alliances	Votes	%	±pp	Total	+/−
People's Party (PP)	41,118	50.46	+1.97	16	+1
Spanish Socialist Workers' Party (PSOE)	29,744	36.50	−1.36	11	−1
Union of the Salamancan People (UPSa)	3,293	4.04	+1.38	0	±0
United Left–The Greens–Commitment for Castile and León (IU–LV–CyL)	2,917	3.58	+0.92	0	±0
Citizens–Party of the Citizenry (C's)	1,859	2.28	New	0	±0
The Greens of Europe (LVE)	501	0.61	New	0	±0
National Democracy (DN)	188	0.23	New	0	±0
Regionalist Party of the Leonese Country (PREPAL)	146	0.18	New	0	±0
Blank ballots	1,715	2.10	−0.34		
Total	81,481			27	±0
Valid votes	81,481	99.36	+0.01		
Invalid votes	526	0.64	−0.01		
Votes cast / turnout	82,007	61.82	−2.59		
Abstentions	50,655	38.18	+2.59		
Registered voters	132,662				

=== Segovia ===
Population: 55,476

← Summary of the 27 May 2007 City Council of Segovia election results →
Parties and alliances	Popular vote			Seats	
Parties and alliances	Votes	%	±pp	Total	+/−
Spanish Socialist Workers' Party (PSOE)	13,082	44.49	+8.02	13	+2
People's Party (PP)	12,666	43.07	+3.32	12	±0
United Left–The Greens–Commitment for Castile and León (IU–LV–CyL)	1,237	4.21	−3.33	0	−2
Independent Segovian Alternative (ASí)	784	2.67	−2.32	0	±0
The Greens (LV)	534	1.82	New	0	±0
Left Segovia (SdI)	333	1.13	New	0	±0
Commoners' Land–Alternative for Castile and León (TC–ACAL)	219	0.74	−0.43	0	±0
Blank ballots	550	1.87	−0.78		
Total	29,405			25	±0
Valid votes	29,405	99.21	+0.04		
Invalid votes	234	0.79	−0.04		
Votes cast / turnout	29,639	69.52	−0.37		
Abstentions	12,993	30.48	+0.37		
Registered voters	42,632				

=== Soria ===
Population: 38,004

← Summary of the 27 May 2007 City Council of Soria election results →
Parties and alliances	Popular vote			Seats	
Parties and alliances	Votes	%	±pp	Total	+/−
Spanish Socialist Workers' Party (PSOE)	7,600	42.59	+7.81	9	+1
People's Party (PP)	7,059	39.56	−1.73	9	−1
Initiative for the Development of Soria (IDES)	1,970	11.04	+1.86	2	±0
United Left–The Greens–Commitment for Castile and León (IU–LV–CyL)	984	5.51	+2.02	1	+1
Independent Sorian Alternative (ALSI)	n/a	n/a	−6.23	0	−1
Blank ballots	230	1.29	−2.13		
Total	17,843			21	±0
Valid votes	17,843	96.29	−2.54		
Invalid votes	687	3.71	+2.54		
Votes cast / turnout	18,530	63.48	−2.42		
Abstentions	10,662	36.52	+2.42		
Registered voters	29,192				

=== Valladolid ===
Population: 319,943

← Summary of the 27 May 2007 City Council of Valladolid election results →
Parties and alliances	Popular vote			Seats	
Parties and alliances	Votes	%	±pp	Total	+/−
People's Party (PP)	87,046	47.81	+3.22	15	±0
Spanish Socialist Workers' Party (PSOE)	71,077	39.04	−0.77	13	±0
United Left–The Greens–Commitment for Castile and León (IU–LV–CyL)	10,727	5.89	+0.56	1	±0
Independent Candidacy–The Party of Castile and León (CI–PCL)	5,685	3.12	−0.54	0	±0
Commoners' Land–Alternative for Castile and León (TC–ACAL)	919	0.50	−0.19	0	±0
The Greens of Europe (LVE)	816	0.45	New	0	±0
Democratic and Social Centre (CDS)	401	0.22	−0.10	0	±0
Anti-Bullfighting Party Against Mistreatment of Animals (PACMA)	379	0.21	New	0	±0
Internationalist Solidarity and Self-Management (SAIn)	266	0.15	New	0	±0
Communist Party of the Castilian People (PCPC)	264	0.15	New	0	±0
Spanish Phalanx of the CNSO (FE de las JONS)^{1}	256	0.14	−0.02	0	±0
For a Fairer World (PUM+J)	226	0.12	New	0	±0
Regionalist Unity of Castile and León (URCL)	202	0.11	−0.05	0	±0
Liberal Democratic Centre (CDL)	195	0.11	New	0	±0
Independent Democrats (DI)	160	0.09	New	0	±0
Humanist Party (PH)	129	0.07	−0.17	0	±0
Blank ballots	3,320	1.82	−0.71		
Total	182,068			29	±0
Valid votes	182,068	99.47	−0.03		
Invalid votes	966	0.53	+0.03		
Votes cast / turnout	183,034	69.11	−1.62		
Abstentions	81,806	30.89	+1.62		
Registered voters	264,840				
Sources
Footnotes: ^{1} Spanish Phalanx of the CNSO results are compared to Independent Spanish Phalanx–Phalanx 2000 totals in the 2003 election.

=== Zamora ===
Population: 66,135

← Summary of the 27 May 2007 City Council of Zamora election results →
Parties and alliances	Popular vote			Seats	
Parties and alliances	Votes	%	±pp	Total	+/−
People's Party (PP)	14,891	43.82	−1.18	12	−1
Spanish Socialist Workers' Party (PSOE)	10,711	31.52	+2.36	8	±0
United Left–The Greens–Commitment for Castile and León (IU–LV–CyL)	4,548	13.38	+3.05	3	+1
Zamoran Independent Electors–Zamoran People's Union (ADEIZA–UPZ)	2,549	7.50	−0.16	2	±0
Independent Candidacy–The Party of Castile and León (CI–PCL)	459	1.35	New	0	±0
Regionalist Party of the Leonese Country (PREPAL)	136	0.40	−0.56	0	±0
United Zamora–Leonese People's Union (ZU–UPL)^{1}	130	0.38	−4.68	0	±0
The Greens of Europe (LVE)	126	0.37	New	0	±0
Blank ballots	430	1.27	−0.56		
Total	33,980			25	±0
Valid votes	33,980	99.32	+0.11		
Invalid votes	233	0.68	−0.11		
Votes cast / turnout	34,213	61.43	−0.27		
Abstentions	21,477	38.57	+0.27		
Registered voters	55,690				
Sources
Footnotes: ^{1} United Zamora–Leonese People's Union results are compared to the combined totals of United Zamora and Leonese People's Union in the 2003 election.

== See also ==
- 2007 Castilian-Leonese regional election
