= 1999 Spanish local elections in Castile and León =

This article presents the results breakdown of the local elections held in Castile and León on 13 June 1999. The following tables show detailed results in the autonomous community's most populous municipalities, sorted alphabetically.

== City control ==
The following table lists party control in the most populous municipalities, including provincial capitals (highlighted in bold). Gains for a party are highlighted in that party's colour.

Municipality	Population	Previous control	New control
**Ávila**	47,650	People's Party (PP)	People's Party (PP)
**Burgos**	161,984	People's Party (PP)	Spanish Socialist Workers' Party (PSOE)
**León**	139,809	People's Party (PP)	People's Party (PP)
**Palencia**	79,745	People's Party (PP)	Spanish Socialist Workers' Party (PSOE)
Ponferrada	61,469	People's Party (PP)	People's Party (PP)
**Salamanca**	158,457	People's Party (PP)	People's Party (PP)
**Segovia**	54,012	People's Party (PP)	Centrist Unity–Democratic and Social Centre (UC–CDS)
**Soria**	33,882	People's Party (PP)	Spanish Socialist Workers' Party (PSOE)
**Valladolid**	319,946	People's Party (PP)	People's Party (PP)
**Zamora**	64,421	People's Party (PP)	People's Party (PP)

== Municipalities ==
=== Ávila ===
Population: 47,650

← Summary of the 13 June 1999 City Council of Ávila election results →
Parties and alliances	Popular vote			Seats	
Parties and alliances	Votes	%	±pp	Total	+/−
People's Party (PP)	13,536	56.60	−7.19	13	−1
Spanish Socialist Workers' Party (PSOE)	5,531	23.13	+8.73	5	+2
United Left of Castile and León (IUCyL)	2,936	12.28	−1.82	3	±0
Spanish Democratic Party (PADE)	455	1.90	New	0	±0
The Phalanx (FE)	297	1.24	New	0	±0
Independent Group of Ávila (AIAV)	n/a	n/a	−5.51	0	−1
Blank ballots	1,161	4.85	+2.65		
Total	23,916			21	±0
Valid votes	23,916	98.48	−0.35		
Invalid votes	368	1.52	+0.35		
Votes cast / turnout	24,284	62.24	−6.55		
Abstentions	14,730	37.76	+6.55		
Registered voters	39,014				

=== Burgos ===
Population: 161,984

← Summary of the 13 June 1999 City Council of Burgos election results →
Parties and alliances	Popular vote			Seats	
Parties and alliances	Votes	%	±pp	Total	+/−
People's Party (PP)	30,207	34.90	−16.29	10	−6
Spanish Socialist Workers' Party (PSOE)	26,259	30.34	+12.94	9	+4
Independent Burgalese Popular Action (APBI)	9,676	11.18	New	3	+3
Commoners' Land–Castilian Nationalist Party (TC–PNC)	8,566	9.90	+7.76	3	+3
United Left of Castile and León (IUCyL)	6,647	7.68	−7.99	2	−3
Spanish Democratic Party (PADE)	1,669	1.93	New	0	±0
Humanist Party (PH)	300	0.35	New	0	±0
Progress, Union and Freedom (PUL)	n/a	n/a	−6.13	0	−1
Blank ballots	3,223	3.72	+1.18		
Total	86,547			27	±0
Valid votes	86,547	99.12	+0.03		
Invalid votes	766	0.88	−0.03		
Votes cast / turnout	87,313	64.80	−3.33		
Abstentions	47,430	35.20	+3.33		
Registered voters	134,743				

=== León ===
Population: 139,809

← Summary of the 13 June 1999 City Council of León election results →
Parties and alliances	Popular vote			Seats	
Parties and alliances	Votes	%	±pp	Total	+/−
People's Party (PP)	31,191	44.61	−1.16	13	−1
Spanish Socialist Workers' Party (PSOE)	17,248	24.67	+2.72	7	+1
Leonese People's Union (UPL)	16,202	23.17	+1.53	7	+1
United Left of Castile and León (IUCyL)	2,549	3.65	−2.82	0	−1
Centrist Union–Democratic and Social Centre (UC–CDS)	440	0.63	New	0	±0
Spanish Democratic Party (PADE)	131	0.19	New	0	±0
The Phalanx (FE)	108	0.15	New	0	±0
Humanist Party (PH)	91	0.13	±0.00	0	±0
National Democracy (DN)	85	0.12	New	0	±0
Blank ballots	1,882	2.69	+0.75		
Total	69,927			27	±0
Valid votes	69,927	99.17	−0.19		
Invalid votes	585	0.83	+0.19		
Votes cast / turnout	70,512	56.17	−11.34		
Abstentions	55,016	43.83	+11.34		
Registered voters	125,528				

=== Palencia ===
Population: 79,745

← Summary of the 13 June 1999 City Council of Palencia election results →
Parties and alliances	Popular vote			Seats	
Parties and alliances	Votes	%	±pp	Total	+/−
Spanish Socialist Workers' Party (PSOE)	20,676	48.07	+9.98	13	+3
People's Party (PP)	17,110	39.78	−5.78	11	−2
United Left (IU)	2,300	5.35	−3.41	1	−1
Federation of Associations for Urban Social Respect (FARSU)	718	1.67	New	0	±0
Regionalist Unity of Castile and León (URCL)	494	1.15	+0.53	0	±0
Commoners' Land–Castilian Nationalist Party (TC–PNC)	327	0.76	+0.22	0	±0
Humanist Party (PH)	109	0.25	New	0	±0
Blank ballots	1,279	2.97	+1.07		
Total	43,013			25	±0
Valid votes	43,013	99.05	−0.12		
Invalid votes	411	0.95	+0.12		
Votes cast / turnout	43,424	64.18	−6.91		
Abstentions	24,234	35.82	+6.91		
Registered voters	67,658				

=== Ponferrada ===
Population: 61,469

← Summary of the 13 June 1999 City Council of Ponferrada election results →
Parties and alliances	Popular vote			Seats	
Parties and alliances	Votes	%	±pp	Total	+/−
People's Party (PP)	18,076	57.34	+13.14	16	+4
Spanish Socialist Workers' Party (PSOE)	9,766	30.98	−4.63	8	−1
Party of El Bierzo (PB)	1,671	5.30	−3.40	1	−1
United Left of Castile and León (IUCyL)	1,450	4.60	−3.01	0	−2
Blank ballots	563	1.79	−0.06		
Total	31,526			25	±0
Valid votes	31,526	99.22	+0.21		
Invalid votes	247	0.78	−0.21		
Votes cast / turnout	31,773	59.84	−5.04		
Abstentions	21,327	40.16	+5.04		
Registered voters	53,100				

=== Salamanca ===
Population: 158,457

← Summary of the 13 June 1999 City Council of Salamanca election results →
Parties and alliances	Popular vote			Seats	
Parties and alliances	Votes	%	±pp	Total	+/−
People's Party (PP)	43,049	53.91	−0.16	17	+1
Spanish Socialist Workers' Party (PSOE)	25,722	32.21	−0.98	10	+1
United Left of Castile and León (IUCyL)	3,704	4.64	−3.99	0	−2
Regionalist Unity of Castile and León (URCL)	1,883	2.36	+1.42	0	±0
Independent Salamancan Union (USI)	1,334	1.67	New	0	±0
Salamancan People for Salamanca–PREPAL (PREPAL)	399	0.50	+0.10	0	±0
Commoners' Land–Castilian Nationalist Party (TC–PNC)	191	0.24	New	0	±0
The Phalanx (FE)	170	0.21	New	0	±0
Spanish Democratic Party (PADE)	156	0.20	New	0	±0
Humanist Party (PH)	147	0.18	New	0	±0
Blank ballots	3,104	3.89	+2.08		
Total	79,859			27	±0
Valid votes	79,859	99.15	−0.23		
Invalid votes	688	0.85	+0.23		
Votes cast / turnout	80,547	57.41	−12.50		
Abstentions	59,757	42.59	+12.50		
Registered voters	140,304				

=== Segovia ===
Population: 54,012

← Summary of the 13 June 1999 City Council of Segovia election results →
Parties and alliances	Popular vote			Seats	
Parties and alliances	Votes	%	±pp	Total	+/−
People's Party (PP)	11,260	41.19	−11.55	12	−3
Spanish Socialist Workers' Party (PSOE)	7,218	26.40	+4.00	7	+1
United Left of Castile and León (IUCyL)	3,824	13.99	−1.64	4	±0
Centrist Union–Democratic and Social Centre (UC–CDS)	2,005	7.33	New	2	+2
Spanish Democratic Party (PADE)	960	3.51	New	0	±0
The Greens–Green Group (LV–GV)	629	2.30	+0.29	0	±0
Commoners' Land–Castilian Nationalist Party (TC–PNC)	241	0.88	New	0	±0
Humanist Party (PH)	57	0.21	New	0	±0
Blank ballots	1,146	4.19	+1.55		
Total	27,340			25	±0
Valid votes	27,340	98.61	−0.36		
Invalid votes	385	1.39	+0.36		
Votes cast / turnout	27,725	61.34	−7.83		
Abstentions	17,475	38.66	+7.83		
Registered voters	45,200				

=== Soria ===
Population: 33,882

← Summary of the 13 June 1999 City Council of Soria election results →
Parties and alliances	Popular vote			Seats	
Parties and alliances	Votes	%	±pp	Total	+/−
People's Party (PP)	6,135	41.87	−3.26	10	−1
Spanish Socialist Workers' Party (PSOE)	4,014	27.39	+5.96	6	+1
Independent Sorian Alternative (ALSI)	2,671	18.23	+7.60	4	+2
United Left of Castile and León (IUCyL)	1,185	8.09	−1.51	1	−1
Blank ballots	648	4.42	+1.48		
Total	14,653			21	±0
Valid votes	14,653	98.07	−1.02		
Invalid votes	289	1.93	+1.02		
Votes cast / turnout	14,942	53.44	−7.52		
Abstentions	13,019	46.56	+7.52		
Registered voters	27,961				

=== Valladolid ===
Population: 319,946

← Summary of the 13 June 1999 City Council of Valladolid election results →
Parties and alliances	Popular vote			Seats	
Parties and alliances	Votes	%	±pp	Total	+/−
People's Party (PP)	79,526	45.83	−1.50	15	±0
Spanish Socialist Workers' Party (PSOE)	64,278	37.05	+3.25	12	+2
United Left of Castile and León (IUCyL)	13,357	7.70	−6.10	2	−2
Independent Candidacy–Union of Regionalist Parties of Castile and León (CI)	6,619	3.81	+2.71	0	±0
Platform of Independents of Spain (PIE)	1,297	0.75	+0.48	0	±0
Centrist Union–Democratic and Social Centre (UC–CDS)	967	0.56	New	0	±0
Commoners' Land–Castilian Nationalist Party (TC–PNC)	796	0.46	+0.16	0	±0
Regionalist Unity of Castile and León (URCL)	623	0.36	+0.10	0	±0
Federation of Associations for Urban Social Respect (FARSU)	595	0.34	New	0	±0
Humanist Party (PH)	358	0.21	New	0	±0
Independent Spanish Phalanx (FEI)	356	0.21	New	0	±0
Blank ballots	4,741	2.73	+0.82		
Total	173,513			29	±0
Valid votes	173,513	99.31	+0.09		
Invalid votes	1,203	0.69	−0.09		
Votes cast / turnout	174,716	63.46	−8.26		
Abstentions	100,607	36.54	+8.26		
Registered voters	275,323				

=== Zamora ===
Population: 64,421

← Summary of the 13 June 1999 City Council of Zamora election results →
Parties and alliances	Popular vote			Seats	
Parties and alliances	Votes	%	±pp	Total	+/−
People's Party (PP)	15,375	50.12	−2.40	15	+1
Spanish Socialist Workers' Party (PSOE)	9,213	30.03	−3.08	8	−1
Centrist Union–Democratic and Social Centre (UC–CDS)	1,794	5.85	New	1	+1
United Left (IU)	1,588	5.18	−3.93	1	−1
Zamoran People's Union (UPZ)	817	2.66	New	0	±0
Zamoran People for Zamora–PREPAL (PREPAL)	513	1.67	−0.70	0	±0
Democratic Party of the New Left (PDNI)	314	1.02	New	0	±0
Humanist Party (PH)	61	0.20	New	0	±0
Regionalist Unity of Castile and León (URCL)	60	0.20	New	0	±0
Blank ballots	941	3.07	+1.18		
Total	30,676			25	±0
Valid votes	30,676	98.71	+0.27		
Invalid votes	400	1.29	−0.27		
Votes cast / turnout	31,076	57.16	−8.60		
Abstentions	23,295	42.84	+8.60		
Registered voters	54,371				

== See also ==
- 1999 Castilian-Leonese regional election
