= 1979 Spanish local elections in Castile and León =

This article presents the results breakdown of the local elections held in Castile and León on 3 April 1979. The following tables show detailed results in the autonomous community's most populous municipalities, sorted alphabetically.

== City control ==
The following table lists party control in the most populous municipalities, including provincial capitals (highlighted in bold).

Municipality	Population	New control
**Ávila**	37,302	Union of the Democratic Centre (UCD)
**Burgos**	145,473	Union of the Democratic Centre (UCD)
**León**	120,761	Spanish Socialist Workers' Party (PSOE) (UCD in 1979)
**Palencia**	65,896	Union of the Democratic Centre (UCD)
Ponferrada	52,488	Spanish Socialist Workers' Party (PSOE)
**Salamanca**	141,474	Spanish Socialist Workers' Party (PSOE)
**Segovia**	48,623	Union of the Democratic Centre (UCD)
**Soria**	28,845	Union of the Democratic Centre (UCD)
**Valladolid**	308,523	Spanish Socialist Workers' Party (PSOE)
**Zamora**	54,819	Union of the Democratic Centre (UCD)

== Municipalities ==
=== Ávila ===
Population: 37,302

Summary of the 3 April 1979 City Council of Ávila election results →
Parties and alliances	Popular vote			Seats	
Parties and alliances	Votes	%	±pp	Total	+/−
Union of the Democratic Centre (UCD)	11,226	67.95	n/a	**15**	n/a
Spanish Socialist Workers' Party (PSOE)	3,810	23.06	n/a	**5**	n/a
Communist Party of Spain (PCE)	989	5.99	n/a	**1**	n/a
Communist Movement–Organization of Communist Left (MC–OIC)	296	1.79	n/a	0	n/a
Blank ballots	201	1.22	n/a		
**Total**	**16,522**			**21**	**n/a**
Valid votes	16,522	98.54	n/a		
Invalid votes	245	1.46	n/a		
**Votes cast / turnout**	**16,767**	**62.76**	**n/a**		
Abstentions	9,949	37.24	n/a		
**Registered voters**	**26,716**				

=== Burgos ===
Population: 145,473

Summary of the 3 April 1979 City Council of Burgos election results →
Parties and alliances	Popular vote			Seats	
Parties and alliances	Votes	%	±pp	Total	+/−
Union of the Democratic Centre (UCD)	23,214	38.82	n/a	**12**	n/a
Spanish Socialist Workers' Party (PSOE)	15,211	25.44	n/a	**8**	n/a
Democratic Coalition (CD)	5,885	9.84	n/a	**3**	n/a
Communist Party of Spain (PCE)	4,349	7.27	n/a	**2**	n/a
Democratic Independent Candidacy (CID)	4,243	7.10	n/a	**2**	n/a
Nationalist Party of Castile and León (PANCAL)	2,200	3.68	n/a	0	n/a
Party of Labour of Castile and León (PTCL)	2,083	3.48	n/a	0	n/a
National Union (UN)	1,644	2.75	n/a	0	n/a
Communist Movement–Organization of Communist Left (MC–OIC)	964	1.61	n/a	0	n/a
Blank ballots	0	0.00	n/a		
**Total**	**59,793**			**27**	**n/a**
Valid votes	59,793	92.32	n/a		
Invalid votes	4,974	7.68	n/a		
**Votes cast / turnout**	**64,767**	**63.71**	**n/a**		
Abstentions	36,900	36.29	n/a		
**Registered voters**	**101,667**				

=== León ===
Population: 120,761

Summary of the 3 April 1979 City Council of León election results →
Parties and alliances	Popular vote			Seats	
Parties and alliances	Votes	%	±pp	Total	+/−
Union of the Democratic Centre (UCD)	17,696	34.57	n/a	**10**	n/a
Spanish Socialist Workers' Party (PSOE)	16,991	33.20	n/a	**10**	n/a
Communist Party of Spain (PCE)	7,023	13.72	n/a	**4**	n/a
Democratic Coalition (CD)	6,775	13.24	n/a	**3**	n/a
Spanish Ruralist Party (PRE)	2,090	4.08	n/a	0	n/a
Party of Labour of Spain (PTE)	609	1.19	n/a	0	n/a
Blank ballots	0	0.00	n/a		
**Total**	**51,184**			**27**	**n/a**
Valid votes	51,184	98.10	n/a		
Invalid votes	989	1.90	n/a		
**Votes cast / turnout**	**52,173**	**58.57**	**n/a**		
Abstentions	36,909	41.43	n/a		
**Registered voters**	**89,082**				

=== Palencia ===
Population: 65,896

Summary of the 3 April 1979 City Council of Palencia election results →
Parties and alliances	Popular vote			Seats	
Parties and alliances	Votes	%	±pp	Total	+/−
Union of the Democratic Centre (UCD)	11,439	40.50	n/a	**11**	n/a
Spanish Socialist Workers' Party (PSOE)	9,459	33.49	n/a	**9**	n/a
Communist Party of Spain (PCE)	3,193	11.31	n/a	**3**	n/a
Democratic Coalition (CD)	2,477	8.77	n/a	**2**	n/a
Spanish Phalanx (FE)	982	3.48	n/a	0	n/a
Party of Labour of Castile and León (PTCL)	572	2.03	n/a	0	n/a
Communist Movement–Organization of Communist Left (MC–OIC)	120	0.42	n/a	0	n/a
Blank ballots	0	0.00	n/a		
**Total**	**28,242**			**25**	**n/a**
Valid votes	28,242	98.53	n/a		
Invalid votes	422	1.47	n/a		
**Votes cast / turnout**	**28,664**	**60.87**	**n/a**		
Abstentions	18,426	39.13	n/a		
**Registered voters**	**47,090**				

=== Ponferrada ===
Population: 52,488

Summary of the 3 April 1979 City Council of Ponferrada election results →
Parties and alliances	Popular vote			Seats	
Parties and alliances	Votes	%	±pp	Total	+/−
Spanish Socialist Workers' Party (PSOE)	5,914	29.16	n/a	**8**	n/a
Union of the Democratic Centre (UCD)	5,530	27.27	n/a	**8**	n/a
Independent Neighbours Association (AVI)	3,645	17.97	n/a	**5**	n/a
Communist Party of Spain (PCE)	2,059	10.15	n/a	**2**	n/a
Bierzo Independents (IB)	1,730	8.53	n/a	**2**	n/a
Democratic Coalition (CD)	734	3.62	n/a	0	n/a
New Force (FN)	569	2.81	n/a	0	n/a
Party of Labour of Spain (PTE)	101	0.50	n/a	0	n/a
Blank ballots	0	0.00	n/a		
**Total**	**20,282**			**25**	**n/a**
Valid votes	20,282	99.02	n/a		
Invalid votes	201	0.98	n/a		
**Votes cast / turnout**	**20,483**	**55.01**	**n/a**		
Abstentions	16,749	44.99	n/a		
**Registered voters**	**37,232**				

=== Salamanca ===
Population: 141,474

Summary of the 3 April 1979 City Council of Salamanca election results →
Parties and alliances	Popular vote			Seats	
Parties and alliances	Votes	%	±pp	Total	+/−
Union of the Democratic Centre (UCD)	28,158	43.96	n/a	**13**	n/a
Spanish Socialist Workers' Party (PSOE)	23,122	36.10	n/a	**11**	n/a
Communist Party of Spain (PCE)	7,439	11.61	n/a	**3**	n/a
Democratic Coalition (CD)	2,892	4.52	n/a	0	n/a
Party of Labour of Spain (PTE)	1,353	2.11	n/a	0	n/a
New Force (FN)	639	1.00	n/a	0	n/a
Revolutionary Communist League (LCR)	444	0.69	n/a	0	n/a
Blank ballots	0	0.00	n/a		
**Total**	**64,047**			**27**	**n/a**
Valid votes	64,047	98.59	n/a		
Invalid votes	918	1.41	n/a		
**Votes cast / turnout**	**64,965**	**61.00**	**n/a**		
Abstentions	41,534	39.00	n/a		
**Registered voters**	**106,499**				

=== Segovia ===
Population: 48,623

Summary of the 3 April 1979 City Council of Segovia election results →
Parties and alliances	Popular vote			Seats	
Parties and alliances	Votes	%	±pp	Total	+/−
Union of the Democratic Centre (UCD)	12,176	57.46	n/a	**13**	n/a
Spanish Socialist Workers' Party (PSOE)	6,956	32.83	n/a	**7**	n/a
Communist Party of Spain (PCE)	1,560	7.36	n/a	**1**	n/a
Communist Movement–Organization of Communist Left (MC–OIC)	499	2.35	n/a	0	n/a
Blank ballots	0	0.00	n/a		
**Total**	**21,191**			**21**	**n/a**
Valid votes	21,191	96.11	n/a		
Invalid votes	858	3.89	n/a		
**Votes cast / turnout**	**22,049**	**65.06**	**n/a**		
Abstentions	11,842	34.94	n/a		
**Registered voters**	**33,891**				

=== Soria ===
Population: 28,845

Summary of the 3 April 1979 City Council of Soria election results →
Parties and alliances	Popular vote			Seats	
Parties and alliances	Votes	%	±pp	Total	+/−
Union of the Democratic Centre (UCD)	4,200	34.67	n/a	**8**	n/a
Spanish Socialist Workers' Party (PSOE)	3,196	26.38	n/a	**6**	n/a
Democratic Coalition (CD)	1,799	14.85	n/a	**3**	n/a
Communist Party of Spain (PCE)	745	6.15	n/a	**1**	n/a
Independent Electoral Group (AEI)	727	6.00	n/a	**1**	n/a
Citizen Movement of Soria (MCS)	700	5.78	n/a	**1**	n/a
Sorian Independent Group (GIS)	629	5.19	n/a	**1**	n/a
Communist Movement (MC)	117	0.97	n/a	0	n/a
Blank ballots	0	0.00	n/a		
**Total**	**12,113**			**21**	**n/a**
Valid votes	12,113	97.52	n/a		
Invalid votes	308	2.48	n/a		
**Votes cast / turnout**	**12,421**	**57.24**	**n/a**		
Abstentions	9,278	42.76	n/a		
**Registered voters**	**21,699**				

=== Valladolid ===
Population: 308,523

Summary of the 3 April 1979 City Council of Valladolid election results →
Parties and alliances	Popular vote			Seats	
Parties and alliances	Votes	%	±pp	Total	+/−
Spanish Socialist Workers' Party (PSOE)	47,939	39.81	n/a	**13**	n/a
Union of the Democratic Centre (UCD)	33,582	27.89	n/a	**9**	n/a
Communist Party of Spain (PCE)	15,722	13.06	n/a	**4**	n/a
Independents (INDEP)	9,174	7.62	n/a	**2**	n/a
Democratic Coalition (CD)	6,221	5.17	n/a	**1**	n/a
Party of Labour of Spain (PTE)	3,021	2.51	n/a	0	n/a
Communist Movement–Organization of Communist Left (MC–OIC)	1,632	1.36	n/a	0	n/a
Nationalist Party of Castile and León (PANCAL)	1,394	1.16	n/a	0	n/a
Left Municipal Union (PCT–LCR)	693	0.58	n/a	0	n/a
Communist Organization of Spain (Red Flag) (OCE–BR)	580	0.48	n/a	0	n/a
Republican Left (IR)	457	0.38	n/a	0	n/a
Liberal Party (PL)	0	0.00	n/a	0	n/a
Workers' Revolutionary Organization (ORT)	0	0.00	n/a	0	n/a
Blank ballots	0	0.00	n/a		
**Total**	**120,415**			**29**	**n/a**
Valid votes	120,415	97.82	n/a		
Invalid votes	2,683	2.18	n/a		
**Votes cast / turnout**	**123,098**	**57.72**	**n/a**		
Abstentions	90,154	42.28	n/a		
**Registered voters**	**213,252**				

=== Zamora ===
Population: 54,819

Summary of the 3 April 1979 City Council of Zamora election results →
Parties and alliances	Popular vote			Seats	
Parties and alliances	Votes	%	±pp	Total	+/−
Union of the Democratic Centre (UCD)	7,560	37.64	n/a	**11**	n/a
Spanish Socialist Workers' Party (PSOE)	6,582	32.77	n/a	**9**	n/a
Democratic Coalition (CD)	2,577	12.83	n/a	**3**	n/a
Independent Zamorans Union (UZI)	1,779	8.86	n/a	**2**	n/a
Liberal Party (PL)	726	3.61	n/a	0	n/a
Communist Movement–Organization of Communist Left (MC–OIC)	588	2.93	n/a	0	n/a
Workers' Revolutionary Organization (ORT)	271	1.35	n/a	0	n/a
Blank ballots	0	0.00	n/a		
**Total**	**20,083**			**25**	**n/a**
Valid votes	20,083	96.29	n/a		
Invalid votes	773	3.71	n/a		
**Votes cast / turnout**	**20,856**	**51.43**	**n/a**		
Abstentions	19,699	48.57	n/a		
**Registered voters**	**40,555**				
