= Independent Solution (Burgos) =

Independent Solution Solución Independiente
- Founder: José María Peña San Martín
- Founded: 1987; 1995
- Dissolved: 1991 (merged into PP); 2011

Independent Solution (Spanish: Solución Independiente, SI) was a regional political party in Castile and León, centered in the province of Burgos. It was formed as a split from the People's Alliance in 1987 by the then mayor of Burgos, José María Peña San Martín, securing an absolute majority in that year's local election in the city, before merging into the People's Party ahead of the 1991 election. It was again established to contest the 1995, 2003 and 2007 local elections before being finally disbanded in 2011.

== Electoral performance ==
=== Cortes of Castile and León ===
Cortes of Castile and León
Election	Leading candidate	Votes	%	Seats	Gov.
1987	Tomás Cortés	19,282	1.3 (#6)	1 / 84	No
1995	José María Peña San Martín	9,107	0.6 (#6)	0 / 84	—

=== City Council of Burgos ===
City Council of Burgos
Election	Leading candidate	Votes	%	Seats	Gov.
1987	José María Peña San Martín	44,638	54.7 (#1)	17 / 27	Yes
1995	Antonio Mateos García	3,131	3.5 (#5)	0 / 27	No
2003	José María Peña San Martín	8,692	8.8 (#3)	2 / 27	No
2007	José María Peña San Martín	6,009	6.5 (#3)	2 / 27	No
