= Alejandro Valderas =

Alejandro Valderas Alonso (born 1962) is a Spanish former politician. A member of the Leonese People's Union (UPL), he served in the Cortes of Castile and León from 2011 to 2015.

== Biography ==
Born in La Bañeza in the Province of León, Valderas has a doctorate in history.

In 1979, Valderas was a founding member of the Grupo Autonómico Leonés. In 1999, he was elected to the city council in León; re-elected four years later, he was put in charge of cultural affairs by the local government. In 2007, the Leonese People's Union (UPL) fell to two seats on the council, meaning that he was not re-elected.

Valderas was named as the UPL's lead candidate in the León constituency in the 2011 Castilian-Leonese regional election, replacing Joaquín Otero, who had held that position since 1995. The party fell from two seats to one, and Valderas sat in the mixed group with the sole deputy of the United Left (IU). In his swearing-in, he swore to represent the "Kingdom of León" and pledged to give his parliamentary medal to the museum of the Mint in Segovia. He said that this gesture came from kindness, rather than his rejection of the Region of León being part of Castile and León. Valderas proposed moving the seat of the Regional Government of Castile and León away from Valladolid, citing that the autonomous community had no capital according to its constitution.

After months of negotiations with the UPL executive, Valderas decided that he would not take part in any elections in 2015, due to fatigue. He returned to the University of León as a librarian.
