= José María Peña San Martín =

Spanish politician (1937–2024)

José María Peña San Martín (1937 – 23 July 2024) was a Spanish economist and politician. He was mayor of Burgos in Castile and León from 1979 to 1992, the longest service in that office. After being disqualified from office due to a corruption conviction, he returned to Burgos City Council from 2003 to 2011.

== Biography ==
Born in La Nuez de Abajo in the Province of Burgos, Peña became the manager of the Industrial Promotion Pole in 1967 and an advisor to the Local Credit Bank of Spain from 1986 to 1990. A graduate in economic sciences from the Complutense University of Madrid, Peña was appointed to the former position in the latter years of Francoist Spain, when most government appointees were law graduates.

In the 1979 Spanish local elections, the first democratic elections since the Spanish transition to democracy, Peña led the Union of the Democratic Centre (UCD) list in Burgos. He was elected for a second term as mayor in 1983, leading the People's Alliance (AP). In 1987, he won a third term as an independent leading the People's Party (PP) list under the name Solución Independiente (SI).

In 1992, Peña was disqualified from public office; he was the first mayor of a provincial capital to receive a criminal conviction, for corruption in construction. He then worked as an economist in Madrid. He was pardoned in 2001 by the PP government of prime minister of Spain José María Aznar and ran for election in Burgos again as part of an SI list, leaving politics in 2011.

Peña and his wife María Pilar had two sons and two daughters. One of their sons, Ignacio, was elected to Burgos City Council for Vox. Peña died on 23 July 2024, at the age of 83.
