= Communist Party of Castile and León =

The Communist Party of Castile–León (Spanish: Partido Comunista de Castilla León, Leonese: Partido Comunista de Castiella Llión) is the federation of the Communist Party of Spain (PCE) in Castile and León.

The party was officially registered on 13 November 1986, and its registered office is located in Madrid.

In the 1983 Castilian-Leonese regional election they won 3.23% of the vote.
