= United Left of Castile and León =

United Left of Castile and León Izquierda Unida de Castilla y León
- General Coordinator: Juan Gascón
- Founded: 1986
- Merger of: Communist Party of Castile–León; Izquierda Abierta; Communist Youth of Castile and León; Republican Left; Independents; Party of Socialist Action (1986-2001); Progressive Federation (1986-1988); Carlist Party (1986-1987); Humanist Party (1986)
- Headquarters: C/ Panaderos Nº 29, 1º C. Valladolid
- Membership (2015): 1,100 official members and 1,500 official sympathizers.
- Ideology: Socialism; Ruralism; Communism; Republicanism; Feminism; Federalism
- Political position: Left-wing
- National affiliation: United Left
- Union affiliation: CCOO
- Town councillors: 163 / 12,861 Not including those gained in coalitions
- Cortes of Castile and León: 0 / 84

Website
- iucy.org

United Left of Castile and León (Spanish: Izquierda Unida de Castilla y León; IUCyL) is the Castilian-Leonese federation of the Spanish left wing political and social movement United Left. José María González is the current General Coordinator. The major member of the coalition is the Communist Party of Castile–León (PCCL, Castilian-Leonese federation of the PCE).

== History ==
In the Castile and León elections of 2015 IUCyL gained 1 seat in the Cortes of Castile and León.

== See also ==
- United Left (Spain)
- Communist Party of Aragon
