= Socialist Party of Castile and León =

Socialist Party of Castile and León Partido Socialista de Castilla y León
- Secretary-General: Carlos Martínez Mínguez
- Headquarters: Avda. Medina del Campo, 11. 47014 Valladolid
- Youth wing: Socialist Youth of Castile and León
- Membership (2017): 9,634
- Ideology: Social democracy Progressivism; Regionalism; Progressive liberalism
- Political position: Centre-left
- National affiliation: Spanish Socialist Workers' Party
- Congress of Deputies: 12 / 31 (Castilian-Leonese seats)
- Spanish Senate: 13 / 39 (Castilian-Leonese seats)
- Cortes of Castile and León: 30 / 82
- Local seats (2023-2027): 3,394 / 12,481

Website
- www.psoecyl.com

The Socialist Party of Castile and León (Spanish: Partido Socialista de Castilla y León, PSCyL) is the Castilian-Leonese federation of the Spanish Socialist Workers' Party (PSOE), the main centre-left party in Spain since the 1970s.

== Electoral performance ==
=== Cortes of Castile and León ===
Cortes of Castile and León
Election	Leading candidate	Votes	%	Seats	Gov.
1983	Demetrio Madrid	608,604	44.4 (#1)	42 / 84	Yes
1987	Juan José Laborda	488,469	34.0 (#2)	32 / 84	No
1991	Jesús Quijano	504,709	36.4 (#2)	35 / 84	No
1995	Jesús Quijano	458,447	29.7 (#2)	27 / 84	No
1999	Jaime González	483,675	33.1 (#2)	30 / 83	No
2003	Ángel Villalba	576,769	36.8 (#2)	32 / 82	No
2007	Ángel Villalba	574,596	37.7 (#2)	33 / 83	No
2011	Óscar López	425,777	29.7 (#2)	29 / 84	No
2015	Luis Tudanca	353,575	25.9 (#2)	25 / 84	No
2019	Luis Tudanca	479,916	34.8 (#1)	35 / 81	No
2022	Luis Tudanca	365,434	30.0 (#2)	28 / 81	No
2026	Carlos Martínez	386,774	30.8 (#2)	30 / 82	No

=== Cortes Generales ===
Cortes Generales
Election	Castile and León						
Election	Congress					Senate	
Election	Votes	%	#	Seats	+/–	Seats	+/–
1977	325,684	23.61%	2nd	8 / 35	—	6 / 36	—
1979	342,798	25.62%	2nd	10 / 35	2	6 / 36	0
1982	645,491	42.38%	1st	18 / 35	8	22 / 36	16
1986	572,973	38.79%	1st	16 / 34	2	15 / 36	7
1989	527,551	35.55%	2nd	14 / 33	2	10 / 36	5
1993	597,961	36.71%	2nd	13 / 33	1	9 / 36	1
1996	589,869	35.03%	2nd	11 / 33	2	9 / 36	0
2000	506,595	32.17%	2nd	11 / 33	0	9 / 36	0
2004	705,053	41.90%	2nd	14 / 33	3	11 / 36	2
2008	715,263	42.78%	2nd	14 / 32	0	11 / 36	0
2011	444,451	29.19%	2nd	11 / 32	3	9 / 36	2
2015	339,277	22.47%	2nd	9 / 32	2	9 / 36	0
2016	336,286	23.15%	2nd	9 / 31	0	9 / 36	0
2019 (Apr)	453,339	29.79%	1st	12 / 31	3	19 / 36	10
2019 (Nov)	434,287	31.27%	2nd	12 / 31	0	12 / 36	5

=== European Parliament ===
European Parliament
Election	Castile and León		
Election	Votes	%	#
1987	505,706	35.11%	2nd
1989	419,922	36.45%	1st
1994	374,327	28.84%	2nd
1999	491,327	33.78%	2nd
2004	472,289	41.61%	2nd
2009	422,272	38.21%	2nd
2014	225,615	23.37%	2nd
2019	474,264	35.03%	1st
