= Regionalist Party of the Leonese Country =

Regionalist Party

Regionalist Party of the Leonese Country Partido Regionalista del País Leonés
- Leader: Francisco Iglesias Carreño
- Founded: 1980
- Ideology: Leonesism
- Local Government (2019-2023): 1 / 5,194

Website
- www.prepal.eu

Regionalist Party of the Leonese Country (Spanish: Partido Regionalista del País Leonés) is a regional political party in Castilla y León, Spain. PREPAL strives to establish a separate autonomous community (País Leonés or Autonomous Community of País Leonés) for the provinces of Salamanca, Zamora and León, (parts of the old Kingdom of León), now in the Autonomous Community of Castile and León. This movement is known as Leonesism.

PREPAL was founded in 1980 by Francisco Iglesias Carreño.

== Other information ==
- List of registered political parties in Spain
- List of political parties in Spain
- List of active autonomist and secessionist movements

== See also ==
- País Leonés
- Kingdom of León
- Leonese language
- Leonese Country
