= Opinion polling for the 2015 Spanish local elections (Castile and León) =

In the run up to the 2015 Spanish local elections, various organisations carried out opinion polling to gauge voting intention in local entities in Spain. Results of such polls for municipalities in Castile and León are displayed in this article. The date range for these opinion polls is from the previous local elections, held on 22 May 2011, to the day the next elections were held, on 24 May 2015.

Polls are listed in reverse chronological order, showing the most recent first and using the dates when the survey fieldwork was done, as opposed to the date of publication. Where the fieldwork dates are unknown, the date of publication is given instead. The highest percentage figure in each polling survey is displayed with its background shaded in the leading party's colour. If a tie ensues, this is applied to the figures with the highest percentages. The "Lead" columns on the right shows the percentage-point difference between the parties with the highest percentages in a given poll.

== Municipalities ==
=== Almazán ===
Polling firm/Commissioner	Fieldwork date	Sample size	Turnout	PPSO	PSOE	PP	IDES	Podemos	C's	Lead
2015 municipal election	24 May 2015	—N/a	67.5	(Note: Within C's.)	42.3; 6	13.5; 1	–	–	41.1; 6	1.2
Celeste-Tel/Diario de Soria	17–19 Sep 2014	350	65.5	39.4; 6	34.0; 5	18.3; 2	3.6; 0	4.8; 0	–	5.4
2011 municipal election	22 May 2011	—N/a	70.7	46.1; 7	38.0; 5	11.2; 1	1.3; 0	–	–	8.1

=== Aranda de Duero ===
Polling firm/Commissioner	Fieldwork date	Sample size	Turnout	PP	PSOE	PCAS	IUCyL	UPyD	CCD	SSPA	C's	RAP	Lead
2015 municipal election	24 May 2015	—N/a	61.7	30.4; 7	20.4; 5	0.9; 0	8.8; 2	5.6; 1	–	12.2; 2	9.3; 2	9.9; 2	10.0
Sigma Dos/Grupo Promecal	10 May 2015	?	?	34.3; 8/9	22.5; 5/6	–	9.4; 2	3.7; 0	–	9.6; 2	14.4; 3	3.6; 0	11.8
2011 municipal election	22 May 2011	—N/a	63.2	36.7; 8	30.1; 7	10.1; 2	8.5; 2	5.6; 1	5.4; 1	–	–	–	6.6

=== Ávila ===
Polling firm/Commissioner	Fieldwork date	Sample size	Turnout	PP	PSOE	UPyD	IUCyL	TC	C's	Lead
2015 municipal election	24 May 2015	—N/a	65.8	33.0; 9	15.5; 4	6.0; 1	10.1; 3	10.4; 3	18.0; 5	15.0
Sigma Dos/Grupo Promecal	21–22 Apr 2015	400	?	34.7; 10	9.0; 2	4.9; 0/1	9.2; 2	8.7; 2	30.8; 8/9	3.9
2011 municipal election	22 May 2011	—N/a	65.9	51.7; 14	17.4; 4	14.3; 4	10.4; 3	–	–	34.3

=== Bembibre ===
Polling firm/Commissioner	Fieldwork date	Sample size	Turnout	PP	PSOE	CB	IUCyL	Podemos	Lead
2015 municipal election	24 May 2015	—N/a	65.7	46.3; 7	35.9; 5	10.9; 1	5.1; 0	–	10.4
Huaris CC/InfoBierzo (Note: Undecided and/or abstentionists excluded.)	4–8 May 2015	262	76.0	56.2; 8	30.7; 4	10.0; 1	3.0; 0	–	25.5
Huaris CC/InfoBierzo	12–15 Jan 2015	184	68.5	46.9	27.0	1.6	1.6	11.1	19.9
2011 municipal election	22 May 2011	—N/a	73.8	54.3; 10	34.7; 7	3.3 (Note: Results for PB.); 0	1.9; 0	–	19.6

=== Benavente ===
Polling firm/Commissioner	Fieldwork date	Sample size	Turnout	PP	PSOE	IUCyL	UPL	BenC	C's	Lead
2015 municipal election	24 May 2015	—N/a	63.8	36.0; 8	27.8; 6	15.6; 3	4.9; 0	2.4; 0	3.8; 0	8.2
Ipsos/La Opinión	27 Apr–4 May 2015	220	64	32.1; 5/6	26.9; 4/5	16.0; 3	–	6.9; 1	9.8; 1	5.2
2011 municipal election	22 May 2011	—N/a	63.7	49.1; 10	23.9; 4	14.3; 2	5.3; 1	–	–	25.2

=== Burgos ===
Polling firm/Commissioner	Fieldwork date	Sample size	Turnout	PP	PSOE	UPyD	IUCyL	PCAS	Podemos	C's	IB	PB	Vox	Lead
2015 municipal election	24 May 2015	—N/a	66.6	31.4; 10	22.7; 7	2.4; 0	(Note: Within Imagina Burgos.)	1.0; 0		13.9; 4	20.7; 6	2.7; 0	2.3; 0	8.7
Sigma Dos/Grupo Promecal	29–30 Apr 2015	600	?	33.8; 10	21.0; 6	2.1; 0		–		21.8; 6/7	16.6; 4/5	–	–	12.0
Celeste-Tel/El Correo de Burgos	28–30 Apr 2015	500	60.2	41.3; 13	23.6; 7	4.6; 0		–		15.5; 5	7.4; 2	3.9; 0	0.4; 0	17.7
Sigma Dos/Grupo Promecal	23–24 Mar 2015	600	?	41.0; 12/13	18.6; 5/6	3.9; 0		–		16.7; 4/5	15.8; 4/5	–	–	22.4
PP	13 Jan 2015	?	?	? 11/12	? 6/7	? 2/3	? 0/1	? 0/1	? 4/5	? 2/3	–	–	–	?
2011 municipal election	22 May 2011	—N/a	65.5	46.2; 15	25.6; 8	11.8; 3	5.1; 1	2.3; 0	–	–	–	–	–	20.6

=== Cacabelos ===
Polling firm/Commissioner	Fieldwork date	Sample size	Turnout	PP	PSOE	IUCyL	ACC	Lead
2015 municipal election	24 May 2015	—N/a	74.0	39.9; 6	39.0; 5	6.9; 1	10.9; 1	0.9
Huaris CC/InfoBierzo	12–16 Jan 2015	182	61.4	27.1	25.3	8.2	16.2	1.8
2011 municipal election	22 May 2011	—N/a	75.7	41.4; 6	35.9; 5	12.4; 2	–	5.5

=== Fabero ===
Polling firm/Commissioner	Fieldwork date	Sample size	Turnout	PSOE	PP	MASS	IUCyL	CB	Podemos	C's	Lead
2015 municipal election	24 May 2015	—N/a	77.3	45.1; 6	6.6; 0	–	18.9; 2	9.1; 1	–	18.8; 2	26.2
Huaris CC/InfoBierzo	12–16 Jan 2015	181	71.8	31.6	18.5	–	5.4	0.8	8.5	–	13.1
2011 municipal election	22 May 2011	—N/a	80.2	44.8; 6	20.9; 3	15.7; 2	15.0; 2	2.1; 0	–	–	23.9

=== La Bañeza ===
Polling firm/Commissioner	Fieldwork date	Sample size	Turnout	PSOE	PP	UPL	ASP	IUCyL	C's	Lead
2015 municipal election	24 May 2015	—N/a	62.2	45.5; 9	32.6; 6	4.8; 0	11.1; 2	–	3.6; 0	12.9
SyM Consulting/La Nueva Crónica	23–24 Feb 2015	486	78.2	42.1; 9/10	23.9; 5	1.6; 0	11.5; 2	3.7; 0	? 0/1	18.2
2011 municipal election	22 May 2011	—N/a	70.9	46.8; 9	39.7; 7	5.1; 1	–	–	–	7.1

=== León ===
Polling firm/Commissioner	Fieldwork date	Sample size	Turnout	PP	PSOE	UPL	León en Común	UPyD	PAL–UL	LD	C's	Vox	Lead
2015 municipal election	24 May 2015	—N/a	62.4	31.8; 10	24.8; 8	5.3; 1	7.1; 2	1.2; 0	1.8; 0	8.2; 2	13.3; 4	0.8; 0	7.0
SyM Consulting/La Nueva Crónica	2–3 May 2015	528	67.1	24.6; 8	21.8; 7	6.0; 2	5.1; 1	0.9; 0	2.5; 0	9.4; 3	21.2; 6	–	2.8
Celeste-Tel/Diario de León	21–24 Apr 2015	500	?	33.9; 11	21.6; 7	1.9; 0	5.5; 1	2.0; 0	–	11.6; 3	17.9; 5	2.1; 0	12.3
ALN-Vector/leonoticias.com	11–13 Mar 2015	800	?	36.2; 11/12	30.6; 9/10	1.7; 0	3.9; 0/1	0.4; 0	0.4; 0	5.7; 1	17.9; 4/5	0.4; 0	5.6
SyM Consulting/La Nueva Crónica	6–8 Mar 2015	699	78.4	25.1; 7/8	16.5; 5	10.8; 3	7.4; 2	1.1; 0	2.8; 0	16.5; 4/5	17.1; 5	–	8.0
Celeste-Tel/Diario de León	1 Feb 2015	500	?	36.3; 11	25.1; 8	6.5; 2	3.9; 0	4.0; 0	–	17.0; 5	5.8; 1	–	11.2
2011 municipal election	22 May 2011	—N/a	64.6	44.6; 15	31.0; 10	6.9; 2	4.2 (Note: Results for IU.); 0	3.1; 0	2.4; 0	–	–	–	13.6

=== Miranda de Ebro ===
Polling firm/Commissioner	Fieldwork date	Sample size	Turnout	PP	PSOE	IUCyL	MP	C's	GM	Lead
2015 municipal election	24 May 2015	—N/a	53.2	30.2; 7	40.3; 10	9.8; 2	7.6; 1	0.0; 0	6.2; 1	10.1
Sigma Dos/Grupo Promecal	9 May 2015	?	?	30.8; 7/8	38.3; 9	8.1; 1/2	7.6; 1	10.5; 2	–	7.5
2011 municipal election	22 May 2011	—N/a	60.6	43.8; 10	40.0; 9	9.7; 2	–	–	–	3.8

=== Palencia ===
Polling firm/Commissioner	Fieldwork date	Sample size	Turnout	PP	PSOE	IUCyL	UPyD	Podemos	C's	GP	Lead
2015 municipal election	24 May 2015	—N/a	66.2	37.5; 10	30.5; 8	(Note: Within Ganemos Palencia.)	1.6; 0		10.4; 3	16.7; 4	7.0
Madison MK/El Norte de Castilla	29 Apr–9 May 2015	633	?	40.9; 11	27.5; 7/8		–		13.7; 3	14.4; 3/4	13.4
Sigma Dos/Grupo Promecal	1–4 May 2015	400	?	40.7; 11/12	26.6; 7		–		12.2; 3	14.1; 3/4	14.1
2011 municipal election	22 May 2011	—N/a	66.6	49.3; 14	37.1; 10	6.8; 1	2.3; 0	–	–	–	12.2

=== Ponferrada ===
Polling firm/Commissioner	Fieldwork date	Sample size	Turnout	PP	PSOE	IAP	IUCyL	CB	PRB	UPyD	Podemos	C's	PeC	VP	USE	Vox	Lead
2015 municipal election	24 May 2015	—N/a	60.5	23.3; 7	20.9; 6	–	(Note: Within En Común.)	9.0; 2	5.2; 1	1.2; 0		9.3; 2	7.9; 2	1.7; 0	18.6; 5	0.8; 0	2.4
Onda Bierzo	13 May 2015	?	?	? 9	? 7	–		? 0	? 0	? 0		? 4	? 1	? 0	? 4	? 0	?
ECD/BierzoDiario	4–9 May 2015	670	62–66	25.9; 8/9	22.2; 6	–		8.6; 2	3.1; 0	3.1; 0		14.0; 4	6.4; 1/2	–	12.8; 3	0.6; 0	3.7
Huaris CC/InfoBierzo	4–9 May 2015	1,405	?	? 8/9	? 6	–		? 0/1	–	–		? 4	–	–	? 6	–	?
Celeste-Tel/Diario de León	6 May 2015	?	59.7	28.2; 9	24.6; 7	–		5.2; 1	4.4; 0	–		13.2; 4	3.9; 0	3.3; 0	13.5; 4	0.8; 0	3.6
ALN-Vector/leonoticias.com	11–13 Mar 2015	800	?	41.5; 12/13	32.3; 10/11	2.9; 0		1.5; 0	–	–		4.8; 0/1	8.7; 2	1.5; 0	–	–	9.2
SyM Consulting/La Nueva Crónica	15 Feb 2015	562	75.7	28.3; 8	19.7; 5/6	4.4; 0	12.9; 3	–	–	1.5; 0	30.6; 8/9	–	–	–	–	–	2.3
Huaris CC/InfoBierzo	12–16 Jan 2015	401	79.6	17.1	31.2	4.9	4.3	3.9	–	–	21.0	–	–	–	–	–	10.2
2011 municipal election	22 May 2011	—N/a	64.3	39.0; 12	24.4; 8	16.5; 5	4.9; 0	4.2; 0	2.6; 0	1.0; 0	–	–	–	–	–	–	14.6

=== Salamanca ===
Polling firm/Commissioner	Fieldwork date	Sample size	Turnout	PP	PSOE	UPyD	IUCyL	C's	Podemos	Ganemos Salamanca	VxSal	Vox	Lead
2015 municipal election	24 May 2015	—N/a	61.8	39.2; 12	23.9; 7	1.0; 0	(Note: Within Ganemos Salamanca.)	13.7; 4		13.6; 4	4.1; 0	1.0; 0	15.3
Madison MK/El Norte de Castilla	29 Apr–9 May 2015	630	?	38.4; 11/12	22.3; 6/7	–		19.7; 6		12.5; 3	–	–	16.1
USAL/Salamanca24horas	15 Apr–1 May 2015	384	?	39.0; 13/14	17.5; 5/6	3.0; 0		14.5; 4/5		14.0; 3/4	4.0; 0/1	0.5; 0	21.5
Celeste-Tel/Diario de Castilla y León	21–24 Apr 2015	500	?	44.1; 11/12	27.4; 8	1.7; 0		16.7; 5		6.3; 1	1.9; 0	0.4; 0	16.7
CASUS/Tribuna Salamanca	16–24 Apr 2015	749	68	38.0; 12	21.5; 6	2.5; 0		18.9; 5		13.1; 4	2.1; 0	–	16.5
PSOE	23–31 Mar 2015	700	?	46.5; 13/14	23.3; 9/10	2.4; 0	2.8; 0	11.5; 3	9.7; 0/1	–	–	–	23.2
USAL/Salamanca24horas	14 Nov–4 Dec 2014	390	?	43.0; 14	19.4; 6	5.5; 1	9.1; 2	5.5; 1	11.5; 3	–	–	–	23.6
USAL/Salamanca24horas	6–20 Dec 2013	384	44	45.7; 14	10.9; 3	20.9; 6	15.5; 4	0.7; 0	–	–	–	–	24.8
2011 municipal election	22 May 2011	—N/a	62.6	52.9; 18	28.9; 9	4.3; 0	3.3; 0	2.5; 0	–	–	–	–	24.0

=== San Andrés del Rabanedo ===
Polling firm/Commissioner	Fieldwork date	Sample size	Turnout	PP	PSOE	UPL	IxSA	PAL–UL	IUCyL	UPyD	C's	Lead
2015 municipal election	24 May 2015	—N/a	60.8	23.5; 5	26.3; 6	8.6; 2	–	6.9; 1	16.9; 4	1.3; 0	12.5; 3	2.8
Celeste-Tel/Diario de León	5 May 2015	290	?	21.7; 5	28.5; 7	6.9; 1	–	4.8; 0	14.6; 3	1.3; 0	21.6; 5	6.8
ALN-Vector/leonoticias.com	11–13 Mar 2015	800	?	27.8; 7	32.3; 8	2.8; 0	–	9.1; 2	5.1; 1	2.8; 0	19.4; 3	4.5
2011 municipal election	22 May 2011	—N/a	61.0	30.5; 8	30.0; 8	10.0; 2	7.1; 1	6.5; 1	5.9; 1	3.5; 0	–	0.5

=== Segovia ===
Polling firm/Commissioner	Fieldwork date	Sample size	Turnout	PP	PSOE	IUCyL	UPyD	SeC	Podemos	C's	S	Lead
2015 municipal election	24 May 2015	—N/a	66.5	29.2; 8	40.0; 12	5.3; 1	6.6; 2	3.1; 0	–	7.2; 2	2.0; 0	10.8
Audacia/Radio Segovia	11–13 May 2015	613	?	26.6; 8	36.3; 10/12	5.0; 0/1	3.8; 0/1	1.1; 0	–	17.4; 5	2.4; 0	9.7
Madison MK/El Norte de Castilla	29 Apr–9 May 2015	631	?	32.0; 9/10	32.4; 9/10	5.7; 1	2.8; 0	–	–	16.6; 4/5	4.3; 0/1	0.4
Javier Arranz	19–23 Jan 2015	600	?	38.0; 10	33.0; 9	5.0; 1	7.0; 1	–	15.0; 4	–	–	5.0
Sigma Dos/PP	Jul 2014	?	?	? 10/11	? 13	? 0/1	–	–	? 0/1	–	–	?
2011 municipal election	22 May 2011	—N/a	70.9	42.6; 12	42.3; 12	5.5; 1	4.8; 0	1.4 (Note: Results for SdI.); 0	–	–	–	0.3

=== Soria ===
Polling firm/Commissioner	Fieldwork date	Sample size	Turnout	PSOE	PP	IUCyL	IDES	C's	UPyD	S	Lead
2015 municipal election	24 May 2015	—N/a	63.0	47.0; 11	29.1; 7	6.3; 1	–	8.2; 1	–	7.4; 1	17.9
A+M/Heraldo de Soria	11–13 May 2015	500	?	36.1; 9	27.5; 6	4.3; 0	–	14.9; 3	1.0; 0	13.3; 3	8.6
Celeste-Tel/Diario de Soria	21–24 Apr 2015	500	64.7	49.4; 12	27.2; 6	4.6; 0	–	11.8; 3	–	4.8; 0	22.2
A+M/Heraldo de Soria	13–15 Apr 2015	500	?	36.2; 9	31.4; 7	5.8; 1	–	11.1; 2	1.9; 0	10.4; 2	4.8
Celeste-Tel/Diario de Soria	3–8 Sep 2014	450	61.1	42.8; 11	34.3; 8	4.4; 0	3.1; 0	4.1; 0	1.2; 0	8.7; 2	8.5
2011 municipal election	22 May 2011	—N/a	63.4	46.1; 12	35.2; 9	4.9; 0	4.3; 0	2.8; 0	0.8; 0	–	10.9

=== Toro ===
Polling firm/Commissioner	Fieldwork date	Sample size	Turnout	PP	PSOE	CT	C's	Lead
2015 municipal election	24 May 2015	—N/a	71.3	30.6; 4	59.6; 9	3.0; 0	5.1; 0	29.0
Ipsos/La Opinión	27 Apr–4 May 2015	200	76	40.0; 5/6	45.2; 6/7	4.3; 0	7.1; 1	5.2
2011 municipal election	22 May 2011	—N/a	74.1	49.2; 7	42.3; 6	–	–	6.9

=== Valladolid ===
Polling firm/Commissioner	Fieldwork date	Sample size	Turnout	PP	PSOE	VTLP	UPyD	SIVA	C's	Lead
2015 municipal election	24 May 2015	—N/a	67.8	35.7; 12	23.3; 8	13.4; 4	1.6; 0	10.0; 3	7.6; 2	12.4
Madison MK/El Norte de Castilla	29 Apr–9 May 2015	702	?	41.5; 13/14	21.1; 6/7	10.8; 3	–	7.6; 2	14.7; 4/5	20.4
Sigma Dos/El Día de Valladolid	4 May 2015	?	?	44.1; 14/15	19.4; 6	8.3; 2	–	7.6; 2	15.2; 4/5	24.7
Celeste-Tel/Diario de Valladolid	21–24 Apr 2015	600	63.5	44.9; 14	25.1; 8	6.7; 2	2.1; 0	6.3; 2	10.9; 3	19.8
2011 municipal election	22 May 2011	—N/a	67.7	50.4; 17	27.0; 9	10.5; 3	4.1; 0	–	–	23.4

=== Villafranca del Bierzo ===
Polling firm/Commissioner	Fieldwork date	Sample size	Turnout	PP	PSOE	MASS	CB	UPL	Podemos	C's	Lead
2015 municipal election	24 May 2015	—N/a	68.2	38.3; 5	27.4; 3	–	6.3; 0	19.0; 2	–	7.3; 1	10.9
Huaris CC/InfoBierzo	12–16 Jan 2015	177	64.6	28.1	30.5	–	0.8	–	13.4	–	2.4
2011 municipal election	22 May 2011	—N/a	72.7	43.2; 5	36.1; 5	11.5; 1	5.8; 0	1.4; 0	–	–	7.1

=== Zamora ===
Polling firm/Commissioner	Fieldwork date	Sample size	Turnout	PP	PSOE	IU	ADEIZA	UPyD	GZ	C's	Lead
2015 municipal election	24 May 2015	—N/a	61.9	32.4; 10	17.0; 5	29.1; 8	3.8; 0	1.1; 0	3.7; 0	8.6; 2	3.3
Ipsos/La Opinión	27 Apr–4 May 2015	500	64	36.1; 10/11	18.8; 5/6	19.7; 5/6	3.0; 0	2.0; 0	4.1; 0	12.2; 3	16.4
PP	12 Jan 2014	600	?	42.2; 11	18.8; 5	21.1; 6	7.6; 2	5.0; 1	–	–	21.1
2011 municipal election	22 May 2011	—N/a	61.8	46.9; 14	23.2; 6	16.1; 4	6.1; 1	2.8; 0	–	–	23.7
