= Soria (Congress of Deputies constituency) =

Electoral constituency in Spain

Coordinates: 41°40′N 2°40′W

- Congress of Deputies; Electoral constituency
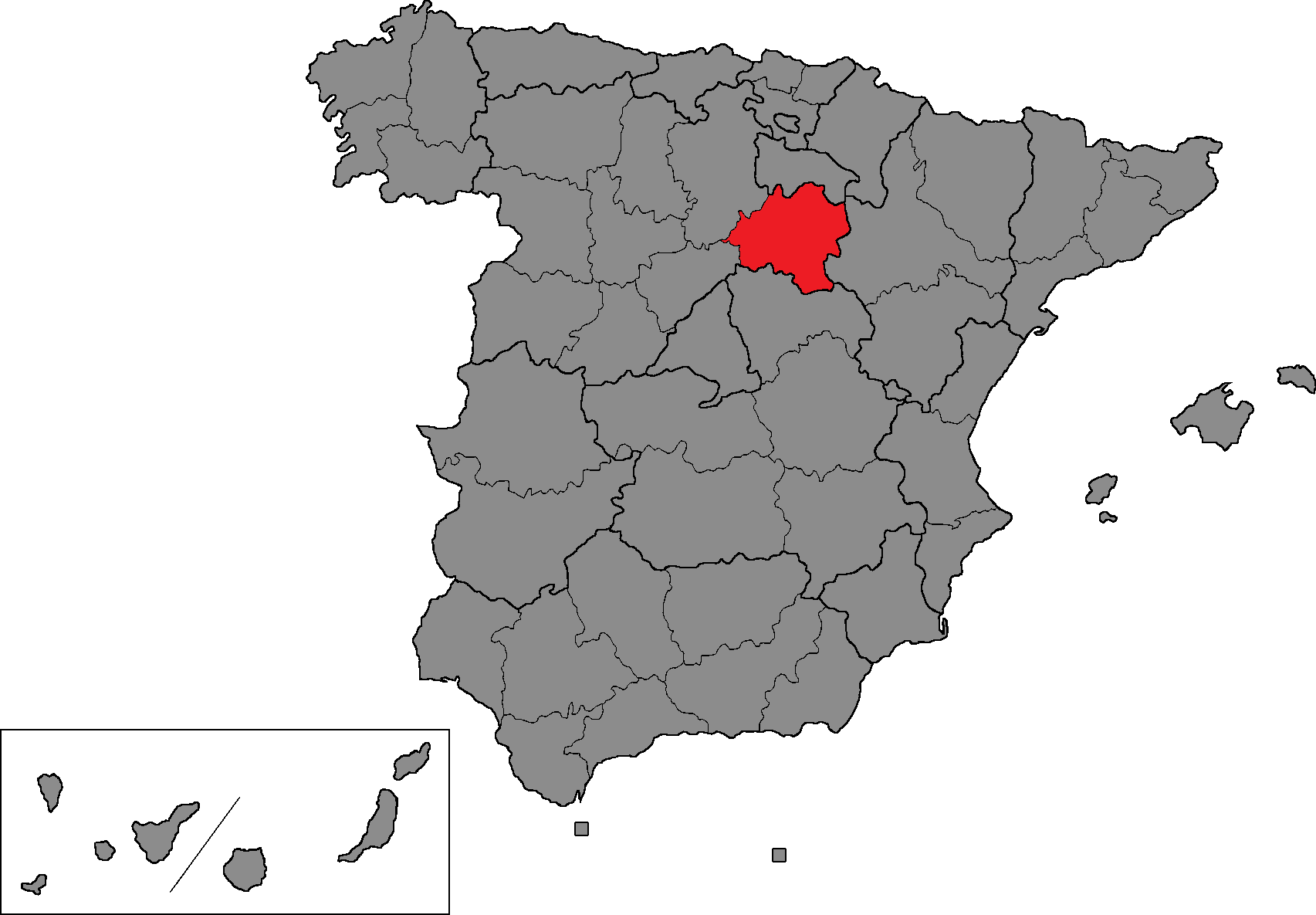
- Location of Soria within Spain
- Province: Soria
- Autonomous community: Castile and León
- Population: ▲90,150 (2024)
- Electorate: ▼75,768 (2023)
- Major settlements: Soria

Current constituency
- Created: 1977
- Seats: 3 (1977–2008); 2 (2008–present)
- Members: PP (1); PSOE (1)

Soria is one of the 52 constituencies represented in the Congress of Deputies, the lower chamber of the Spanish parliament, the Cortes Generales. The constituency (whose boundaries correspond to those of the homonymous province) currently elects two deputies. The electoral system uses the D'Hondt method and closed-list proportional voting, with a minimum threshold of three percent.

== Electoral system ==
The constituency was created as per the Political Reform Law and was first contested in the 1977 general election. The Law provided for the provinces of Spain to be established as multi-member districts in the Congress of Deputies, with this regulation being maintained under the Spanish Constitution of 1978. Additionally, the Constitution requires for any modification of the provincial limits to be approved under an organic law, needing an absolute majority in the Cortes Generales.

Voting is based on universal suffrage, comprising all Spanish nationals over 18 years of age with full political rights, provided that they have not been deprived of the right to vote by a final sentence. The only exception was in 1977, when this was limited to nationals over 21 years of age and in full enjoyment of their political and civil rights. Amendments in 2011 required non-resident citizens to apply for voting, a system known as "begged" voting (Spanish: Voto rogado). which was abolished in 2022. Further, amendments in 2018 granted the right to vote to those legally incapacitated. The Congress of Deputies has a minimum of 300 and a maximum of 400 seats, with electoral provisions fixing its size at 350. Of these, 348 are elected in 50 multi-member constituencies corresponding to the provinces of Spain—each of which is assigned an initial minimum of two seats and the remaining 248 distributed in proportion to population—using the D'Hondt method and closed-list proportional voting, with a three percent-threshold of valid votes (including blank ballots) in each constituency. The remaining two seats are allocated to Ceuta and Melilla as single-member districts elected by plurality voting. The use of this electoral method may result in a higher effective threshold depending on district magnitude and vote distribution. The law does not provide for by-elections to fill vacant seats; instead, any vacancies arising after the proclamation of candidates and during the legislative term are filled by the next candidates on the party lists or, when required, by designated substitutes.

The electoral law allows for parties and federations registered in the interior ministry, alliances and groupings of electors to present lists of candidates. Parties and federations intending to form an alliance are required to inform the relevant electoral commission within 10 days of the election call—15 before 1985—whereas groupings of electors need to secure the signature of at least one percent of the electorate in the constituencies for which they seek election—one permille of the electorate, with a compulsory minimum of 500 signatures, until 1985—disallowing electors from signing for more than one list. Also since 2011, parties, federations or alliances that have not obtained a mandate in either chamber of the Cortes at the preceding election are required to secure the signature of at least 0.1 percent of electors in the aforementioned constituencies. Amendments in 2007 required a balanced composition of men and women in the electoral lists, so that candidates of either sex made up at least 40 percent of the total composition; further amendments in 2024 required the use of a zipper system.

== Deputies ==
Deputies 1977–present
Key to parties PSOE UCD PP CP AP
Legislature	Election	Distribution
Constituent	1977	3
1st	1979	1 / 2
2nd	1982	1 / 1 / 1
3rd	1986	1 / 2
4th	1989	1 / 2
5th	1993	1 / 2
6th	1996	1 / 2
7th	2000	1 / 2
8th	2004	1 / 2
9th	2008	1 / 1
10th	2011	1 / 1
11th	2015	1 / 1
12th	2016	1 / 1
13th	2019 (Apr)	1 / 1
14th	2019 (Nov)	1 / 1
15th	2023	1 / 1

== General elections ==
=== 2026 ===
Summary of the 29 November 2026 Congress of Deputies election results in Soria
Parties and alliances	Popular vote			Seats	
Parties and alliances	Votes	%	±pp	Total	+/−
People's Party (PP)					
Spanish Socialist Workers' Party (PSOE)					
Soria Now! (SY)					
Vox (Vox)					
Broad Front (FA)^{1}			n/a		
We Can (Podemos)^{1}			n/a		
Workers' Front (FO)					
Communist Party of the Workers of Spain (PCTE)					
For a Fairer World (M+J)					
The Party is Over (SALF)			New		
Blank Seats to Leave Empty Seats (EB)			New		
Blank ballots					
Total				2	±0
Valid votes					
Invalid votes					
Votes cast / turnout					
Abstentions					
Registered voters	77,069				
Sources
Footnotes: ^{1} Within the Unite alliance in the 2023 election.

=== 2023 ===
Summary of the 23 July 2023 Congress of Deputies election results in Soria
Parties and alliances	Popular vote			Seats	
Parties and alliances	Votes	%	±pp	Total	+/−
People's Party (PP)	18,895	37.22	+4.37	1	±0
Spanish Socialist Workers' Party (PSOE)	14,966	29.48	–5.09	1	±0
Soria Now! (SY)	9,697	19.10	New	0	±0
Vox (Vox)	4,978	9.81	–3.69	0	±0
Unite (Sumar)^{1}	1,711	3.37	–4.21	0	±0
Animalist Party with the Environment (PACMA)^{2}	94	0.19	–0.25	0	±0
Workers' Front (FO)	68	0.13	New	0	±0
Communist Party of the Workers of Spain (PCTE)	43	0.08	–0.11	0	±0
For a Fairer World (PUM+J)	23	0.05	–0.15	0	±0
Zero Cuts (Recortes Cero)	9	0.02	–0.18	0	±0
Blank ballots	285	0.56	–0.99		
Total	50,769			2	±0
Valid votes	50,769	99.24	+1.01		
Invalid votes	388	0.76	–1.01		
Votes cast / turnout	51,157	67.52	+6.02		
Abstentions	24,611	32.48	-6.02		
Registered voters	75,768				
Sources
Footnotes: ^{1} Unite results are compared to United We Can totals in the November 2019 election.; ^{2} Animalist Party with the Environment results are compared to Animalist Party Against Mistreatment of Animals totals in the November 2019 election.

=== November 2019 ===
Summary of the 10 November 2019 Congress of Deputies election results in Soria
Parties and alliances	Popular vote			Seats	
Parties and alliances	Votes	%	±pp	Total	+/−
Spanish Socialist Workers' Party (PSOE)	16,043	34.57	+2.86	1	±0
People's Party (PP)	15,247	32.85	+6.18	1	±0
Vox (Vox)	6,264	13.50	+4.16	0	±0
United We Can (Podemos–IU)	3,517	7.58	–1.02	0	±0
Citizens–Party of the Citizenry (Cs)	2,670	5.75	–10.57	0	±0
Sorian People's Platform (PPSO)	1,466	3.16	–1.95	0	±0
Animalist Party Against Mistreatment of Animals (PACMA)	205	0.44	–0.07	0	±0
Zero Cuts–Green Group–PCAS–TC (Recortes Cero–GV–PCAS–TC)	95	0.20	±0.00	0	±0
For a Fairer World (PUM+J)	95	0.20	+0.05	0	±0
Communist Party of the Workers of Spain (PCTE)	87	0.19	+0.03	0	±0
Blank ballots	721	1.55	+0.32		
Total	46,410			2	±0
Valid votes	46,410	98.23	–0.23		
Invalid votes	838	1.77	+0.23		
Votes cast / turnout	47,248	61.50	–7.32		
Abstentions	29,579	38.50	+7.32		
Registered voters	76,827				

=== April 2019 ===
Summary of the 28 April 2019 Congress of Deputies election results in Soria
Parties and alliances	Popular vote			Seats	
Parties and alliances	Votes	%	±pp	Total	+/−
Spanish Socialist Workers' Party (PSOE)	16,513	31.71	+5.99	1	±0
People's Party (PP)	13,887	26.67	–18.20	1	±0
Citizens–Party of the Citizenry (Cs)	8,501	16.32	+4.87	0	±0
Vox (Vox)	4,866	9.34	+9.10	0	±0
United We Can (Podemos–IU–Equo)	4,481	8.60	–6.72	0	±0
Sorian People's Platform (PPSO)	2,663	5.11	New	0	±0
Animalist Party Against Mistreatment of Animals (PACMA)	263	0.51	–0.01	0	±0
Zero Cuts–Green Group–PCAS–TC (Recortes Cero–GV–PCAS–TC)	103	0.20	+0.02	0	±0
Communist Party of the Workers of Spain (PCTE)	81	0.16	New	0	±0
For a Fairer World (PUM+J)	77	0.15	New	0	±0
Blank ballots	642	1.23	+0.02		
Total	52,077			2	±0
Valid votes	52,077	98.46	–0.11		
Invalid votes	815	1.54	+0.11		
Votes cast / turnout	52,892	68.82	+3.29		
Abstentions	23,969	31.18	–3.29		
Registered voters	76,861				

=== 2016 ===
Summary of the 26 June 2016 Congress of Deputies election results in Soria
Parties and alliances	Popular vote			Seats	
Parties and alliances	Votes	%	±pp	Total	+/−
People's Party (PP)	22,264	44.87	+6.23	1	±0
Spanish Socialist Workers' Party (PSOE)	12,762	25.72	+1.93	1	±0
United We Can (Podemos–IU–Equo)^{1}	7,599	15.32	–4.29	0	±0
Citizens–Party of the Citizenry (C's)	5,679	11.45	–3.74	0	±0
Animalist Party Against Mistreatment of Animals (PACMA)	260	0.52	+0.15	0	±0
Union, Progress and Democracy (UPyD)	125	0.25	–0.38	0	±0
Vox (Vox)	119	0.24	New	0	±0
Zero Cuts–Green Group (Recortes Cero–GV)	90	0.18	+0.01	0	±0
Spanish Phalanx of the CNSO (FE de las JONS)	63	0.13	New	0	±0
Communist Party of the Peoples of Spain (PCPE)	57	0.11	+0.01	0	±0
Blank ballots	600	1.21	–0.10		
Total	49,618			2	±0
Valid votes	49,618	98.57	–0.20		
Invalid votes	719	1.43	+0.20		
Votes cast / turnout	50,337	65.53	–2.64		
Abstentions	26,477	34.47	+2.64		
Registered voters	76,814				
Sources
Footnotes: ^{1} United We Can results are compared to the combined totals of We Can and United Left–Popular Unity in Common in the 2015 election.

=== 2015 ===
Summary of the 20 December 2015 Congress of Deputies election results in Soria
Parties and alliances	Popular vote			Seats	
Parties and alliances	Votes	%	±pp	Total	+/−
People's Party (PP)	20,030	38.64	–16.29	1	±0
Spanish Socialist Workers' Party (PSOE)	12,331	23.79	–7.66	1	±0
We Can (Podemos)	8,328	16.07	New	0	±0
Citizens–Party of the Citizenry (C's)	7,872	15.19	New	0	±0
United Left–Popular Unity in Common (IU–UPeC)	1,836	3.54	–1.13	0	±0
Union, Progress and Democracy (UPyD)	327	0.63	–3.66	0	±0
Animalist Party Against Mistreatment of Animals (PACMA)	192	0.37	+0.07	0	±0
National Democracy (DN)	101	0.19	–0.16	0	±0
Zero Cuts–Green Group (Recortes Cero–GV)	86	0.17	New	0	±0
Communist Party of the Peoples of Spain (PCPE)	54	0.10	New	0	±0
Blank ballots	679	1.31	–1.22		
Total	51,836			2	±0
Valid votes	51,836	98.77	+0.99		
Invalid votes	647	1.23	–0.99		
Votes cast / turnout	52,483	68.17	+0.62		
Abstentions	24,503	31.83	–0.62		
Registered voters	76,986				

=== 2011 ===
Summary of the 20 November 2011 Congress of Deputies election results in Soria
Parties and alliances	Popular vote			Seats	
Parties and alliances	Votes	%	±pp	Total	+/−
People's Party (PP)	28,063	54.93	+5.13	1	±0
Spanish Socialist Workers' Party (PSOE)	16,066	31.45	–11.15	1	±0
United Left of Castile and León: Plural Left (IUCyL)	2,385	4.67	+2.43	0	±0
Union, Progress and Democracy (UPyD)	2,190	4.29	+2.32	0	±0
Equo (Equo)	559	1.09	New	0	±0
National Democracy (DN)	181	0.35	+0.25	0	±0
Animalist Party Against Mistreatment of Animals (PACMA)	152	0.30	+0.14	0	±0
For a Fairer World (PUM+J)	127	0.25	+0.13	0	±0
Communist Unification of Spain (UCE)	73	0.14	New	0	±0
Blank ballots	1,295	2.53	+0.80		
Total	51,091			2	±0
Valid votes	51,091	97.78	+0.19		
Invalid votes	1,161	2.22	–0.19		
Votes cast / turnout	52,252	67.55	–6.66		
Abstentions	25,103	32.45	+6.66		
Registered voters	77,355				

=== 2008 ===
Summary of the 9 March 2008 Congress of Deputies election results in Soria
Parties and alliances	Popular vote			Seats	
Parties and alliances	Votes	%	±pp	Total	+/−
People's Party (PP)	27,905	49.80	–1.00	1	–1
Spanish Socialist Workers' Party (PSOE)	23,868	42.60	+3.81	1	±0
United Left–Alternative (IU)	1,253	2.24	+0.10	0	±0
Union, Progress and Democracy (UPyD)	1,106	1.97	New	0	±0
Citizens–Party of the Citizenry (C's)	187	0.33	New	0	±0
The Greens (LV)	107	0.19	New	0	±0
The Greens of Europe (LVdE)	96	0.17	New	0	±0
Anti-Bullfighting Party Against Mistreatment of Animals (PACMA)	91	0.16	New	0	±0
Social Democratic Party (PSD)	83	0.15	New	0	±0
Commoners' Land (TC)	83	0.15	+0.03	0	±0
For a Fairer World (PUM+J)	66	0.12	New	0	±0
National Democracy (DN)	55	0.10	+0.06	0	±0
Communist Party of the Castilian People (PCPC–PCPE)	50	0.09	+0.04	0	±0
Spanish Phalanx of the CNSO (FE de las JONS)	48	0.09	+0.03	0	±0
Family and Life Party (PFyV)	27	0.05	New	0	±0
Spanish Alternative (AES)	20	0.04	New	0	±0
Spain 2000 (E–2000)	16	0.03	New	0	±0
Blank ballots	972	1.73	–0.45		
Total	56,033			2	–1
Valid votes	56,033	97.59	+0.32		
Invalid votes	1,386	2.41	–0.32		
Votes cast / turnout	57,419	74.21	–1.01		
Abstentions	19,951	25.79	+1.01		
Registered voters	77,370				

=== 2004 ===
Summary of the 14 March 2004 Congress of Deputies election results in Soria
Parties and alliances	Popular vote			Seats	
Parties and alliances	Votes	%	±pp	Total	+/−
People's Party (PP)	29,187	50.80	–7.67	2	±0
Spanish Socialist Workers' Party (PSOE)	22,287	38.79	+6.81	1	±0
Initiative for the Development of Soria (IDES)	2,934	5.11	New	0	±0
United Left (IU)	1,230	2.14	–2.19	0	±0
Citizens for Blank Votes (CenB)	100	0.17	New	0	±0
Democratic and Social Centre (CDS)	89	0.15	–1.15	0	±0
Commoners' Land–Castilian Nationalist Party (TC–PNC)	71	0.12	–0.31	0	±0
Family and Life Party (PFyV)	39	0.10	New	0	±0
Humanist Party (PH)	35	0.06	New	0	±0
Republican Left (IR)	34	0.06	New	0	±0
Spanish Phalanx of the CNSO (FE de las JONS)	32	0.06	New	0	±0
Carlist Party (PC)	28	0.05	New	0	±0
Communist Party of the Castilian People (PCPC–PCPE)	28	0.05	New	0	±0
Spanish Democratic Party (PADE)	25	0.04	–0.06	0	±0
National Democracy (DN)	23	0.04	New	0	±0
The Phalanx (FE)	20	0.03	–0.07	0	±0
Spanish Absolute Honesty Political Group (GPHAE)	17	0.03	New	0	±0
Authentic Phalanx (FA)	17	0.03	New	0	±0
Republican Social Movement (MSR)	8	0.01	New	0	±0
Blank ballots	1,255	2.18	–0.62		
Total	57,459			3	±0
Valid votes	57,459	97.27	–1.66		
Invalid votes	1,612	2.73	+1.66		
Votes cast / turnout	59,071	75.22	+5.92		
Abstentions	19,460	24.78	–5.92		
Registered voters	78,531				

=== 2000 ===
Summary of the 12 March 2000 Congress of Deputies election results in Soria
Parties and alliances	Popular vote			Seats	
Parties and alliances	Votes	%	±pp	Total	+/−
People's Party (PP)	31,883	58.47	+3.27	2	±0
Spanish Socialist Workers' Party–Progressives (PSOE–p)	17,436	31.98	–2.31	1	±0
United Left (IU)	2,363	4.33	–3.57	0	±0
Centrist Union–Democratic and Social Centre (UC–CDS)	709	1.30	+0.96	0	±0
Commoners' Land–Castilian Nationalist Party (TC–PNC)	237	0.43	+0.21	0	±0
Natural Law Party (PLN)	112	0.21	New	0	±0
Regionalist Unity of Castile and León (URCL)	109	0.20	±0.00	0	±0
Spanish Democratic Party (PADE)	57	0.10	New	0	±0
The Phalanx (FE)	53	0.10	New	0	±0
Spain 2000 Platform (ES2000)	40	0.07	New	0	±0
Blank ballots	1,527	2.80	+0.96		
Total	54,526			3	±0
Valid votes	54,526	98.93	–0.30		
Invalid votes	588	1.07	+0.30		
Votes cast / turnout	55,114	69.30	–5.37		
Abstentions	24,411	30.70	+5.37		
Registered voters	79,525				

=== 1996 ===
Summary of the 3 March 1996 Congress of Deputies election results in Soria
Parties and alliances	Popular vote			Seats	
Parties and alliances	Votes	%	±pp	Total	+/−
People's Party (PP)	32,561	55.20	+4.49	2	±0
Spanish Socialist Workers' Party (PSOE)	20,226	34.29	–2.51	1	±0
United Left of Castile and León (IUCL)	4,662	7.90	+2.29	0	±0
Centrist Union (UC)	200	0.34	–3.34	0	±0
Commoners' Land–Castilian Nationalist Party (TC–PNC)	132	0.22	+0.17	0	±0
Regionalist Unity of Castile and León (URCL)	119	0.20	+0.12	0	±0
Blank ballots	1,083	1.84	+0.40		
Total	58,983			3	±0
Valid votes	58,983	99.23	+0.21		
Invalid votes	458	0.77	–0.21		
Votes cast / turnout	59,441	74.67	+0.12		
Abstentions	20,161	25.33	–0.12		
Registered voters	79,602				

=== 1993 ===
Summary of the 6 June 1993 Congress of Deputies election results in Soria
Parties and alliances	Popular vote			Seats	
Parties and alliances	Votes	%	±pp	Total	+/−
People's Party (PP)	29,627	50.71	+2.80	2	±0
Spanish Socialist Workers' Party (PSOE)	21,498	36.80	+3.81	1	±0
United Left of Castile and León (IU)	3,280	5.61	+0.47	0	±0
Democratic and Social Centre (CDS)	2,151	3.68	–5.74	0	±0
The Greens (Verdes)	305	0.52	New	0	±0
Ruiz-Mateos Group–European Democratic Alliance (ARM–ADE)	199	0.34	–0.49	0	±0
The Ecologists (LE)	128	0.22	New	0	±0
Progressive Sorian Union (US)	98	0.17	New	0	±0
Nationalist Party of Castile and León (PANCAL)	70	0.12	–0.33	0	±0
Castilianist Union (UC)	64	0.11	New	0	±0
Regionalist Unity of Castile and León (URCL)	46	0.08	New	0	±0
Natural Law Party (PLN)	35	0.06	New	0	±0
Coalition for a New Socialist Party (CNPS)^{1}	33	0.06	–0.08	0	±0
Commoners' Land–Castilian Nationalist Party (TC–PNC)	31	0.05	New	0	±0
Humanist Party (PH)	12	0.02	–0.23	0	±0
Communist Unification of Spain (UCE)	0	0.00	New	0	±0
Blank ballots	844	1.44	+0.23		
Total	58,421			3	±0
Valid votes	58,421	99.02	+0.46		
Invalid votes	578	0.98	–0.46		
Votes cast / turnout	58,999	74.55	+3.30		
Abstentions	20,144	25.45	–3.30		
Registered voters	79,143				
Sources
Footnotes: ^{1} Coalition for a New Socialist Party results are compared to Alliance for the Republic totals in the 1989 election.

=== 1989 ===
Summary of the 29 October 1989 Congress of Deputies election results in Soria
Parties and alliances	Popular vote			Seats	
Parties and alliances	Votes	%	±pp	Total	+/−
People's Party (PP)^{1}	26,756	47.91	+5.79	2	±0
Spanish Socialist Workers' Party (PSOE)	18,421	32.99	–2.84	1	±0
Democratic and Social Centre (CDS)	5,260	9.42	–4.67	0	±0
United Left (IU)	2,872	5.14	+2.50	0	±0
Workers' Socialist Party (PST)	539	0.97	+0.35	0	±0
Ruiz-Mateos Group (Ruiz-Mateos)	466	0.83	New	0	±0
Nationalist Party of Castile and León (PANCAL)	252	0.45	New	0	±0
Workers' Party of Spain–Communist Unity (PTE–UC)^{2}	164	0.29	–0.41	0	±0
Humanist Party (PH)	137	0.25	New	0	±0
Communist Party of the Peoples of Spain (PCPE)	117	0.21	New	0	±0
Spanish Phalanx of the CNSO (FE–JONS)	106	0.19	–0.14	0	±0
Alliance for the Republic (AxR)	77	0.14	New	0	±0
Blank ballots	677	1.21	+0.17		
Total	55,844			3	±0
Valid votes	55,844	98.56	+1.77		
Invalid votes	814	1.44	–1.77		
Votes cast / turnout	56,658	71.25	–0.83		
Abstentions	22,862	28.75	+0.83		
Registered voters	79,520				
Sources
Footnotes: ^{1} People's Party results are compared to People's Coalition totals in the 1986 election.; ^{2} Workers' Party of Spain–Communist Unity results are compared to Communists' Unity Board totals in the 1986 election.

=== 1986 ===
Summary of the 22 June 1986 Congress of Deputies election results in Soria
Parties and alliances	Popular vote			Seats	
Parties and alliances	Votes	%	±pp	Total	+/−
People's Coalition (AP–PDP–PL)^{1}	23,949	42.12	+4.85	2	+1
Spanish Socialist Workers' Party (PSOE)	20,373	35.83	+0.49	1	±0
Democratic and Social Centre (CDS)	8,014	14.09	+9.38	0	±0
United Left (IU)^{2}	1,500	2.64	+1.47	0	±0
Democratic Reformist Party (PRD)	1,237	2.18	New	0	±0
Communists' Unity Board (MUC)	400	0.70	New	0	±0
Workers' Socialist Party (PST)	354	0.62	+0.17	0	±0
Communist Unification of Spain (UCE)	277	0.49	+0.22	0	±0
Party of the Communists of Catalonia (PCC)	167	0.29	New	0	±0
Union of the Democratic Centre (UCD)	n/a	n/a	–18.70	0	–1
Blank ballots	592	1.04	–0.22		
Total	56,863			3	±0
Valid votes	56,863	96.79	+0.30		
Invalid votes	1,888	3.21	–0.30		
Votes cast / turnout	58,751	72.08	–8.38		
Abstentions	22,760	27.92	+8.38		
Registered voters	81,511				
Sources
Footnotes: ^{1} People's Coalition results are compared to People's Alliance–People's Democratic Party totals in the 1982 election.; ^{2} United Left results are compared to Communist Party of Spain totals in the 1982 election.

=== 1982 ===
Summary of the 28 October 1982 Congress of Deputies election results in Soria
Parties and alliances	Popular vote			Seats	
Parties and alliances	Votes	%	±pp	Total	+/−
People's Alliance–People's Democratic Party (AP–PDP)^{1}	22,820	37.27	+27.24	1	+1
Spanish Socialist Workers' Party (PSOE)	21,639	35.34	+9.79	1	±0
Union of the Democratic Centre (UCD)	11,453	18.70	–38.50	1	–1
Democratic and Social Centre (CDS)	2,881	4.71	New	0	±0
Communist Party of Spain (PCE)	715	1.17	–1.62	0	±0
New Force (FN)^{2}	405	0.66	–0.54	0	±0
Workers' Socialist Party (PST)	278	0.45	New	0	±0
Communist Unification of Spain (UCE)	168	0.27	New	0	±0
Falangist Movement of Spain (MFE)	102	0.17	New	0	±0
Revolutionary Communist League (LCR)	0	0.00	New	0	±0
Communist Movement of Castile and León (MC–CL)	0	0.00	New	0	±0
Blank ballots	769	1.26	+0.20		
Total	61,230			3	±0
Valid votes	61,230	96.49	–1.01		
Invalid votes	2,228	3.51	+1.01		
Votes cast / turnout	63,458	80.46	+10.81		
Abstentions	15,413	19.54	–10.81		
Registered voters	78,871				
Sources
Footnotes: ^{1} People's Alliance–People's Democratic Party results are compared to Democratic Coalition totals in the 1979 election.; ^{2} New Force results are compared to National Union totals in the 1979 election.

=== 1979 ===
Summary of the 1 March 1979 Congress of Deputies election results in Soria
Parties and alliances	Popular vote			Seats	
Parties and alliances	Votes	%	±pp	Total	+/−
Union of the Democratic Centre (UCD)	31,756	57.20	–1.40	2	–1
Spanish Socialist Workers' Party (PSOE)^{1}	14,187	25.55	+2.87	1	+1
Democratic Coalition (CD)^{2}	5,567	10.03	+3.74	0	±0
Communist Party of Spain (PCE)	1,550	2.79	+0.81	0	±0
National Union (UN)	664	1.20	New	0	±0
Party of Labour of Spain (PTE)^{3}	341	0.61	+0.35	0	±0
Workers' Revolutionary Organization (ORT)	320	0.58	New	0	±0
Communist Movement–Organization of Communist Left (MC–OIC)	301	0.54	New	0	±0
Communist Organization of Spain (Red Flag) (OCE–BR)	246	0.44	New	0	±0
Blank ballots	588	1.06	+0.59		
Total	55,520			3	±0
Valid votes	55,520	97.50	–0.95		
Invalid votes	1,426	2.50	+0.95		
Votes cast / turnout	56,946	69.65	–13.10		
Abstentions	24,818	30.35	+13.10		
Registered voters	81,764				
Sources
Footnotes: ^{1} Spanish Socialist Workers' Party results are compared to the combined totals of Spanish Socialist Workers' Party and People's Socialist Party–Socialist Unity in the 1977 election.; ^{2} Democratic Coalition results are compared to People's Alliance totals in the 1977 election.; ^{3} Party of Labour of Spain results are compared to Democratic Left Front totals in the 1977 election.

=== 1977 ===
Summary of the 15 June 1977 Congress of Deputies election results in Soria
Parties and alliances	Popular vote			Seats	
Parties and alliances	Votes	%	±pp	Total	+/−
Union of the Democratic Centre (UCD)	35,324	58.60	n/a	3	n/a
Spanish Socialist Workers' Party (PSOE)	10,757	17.85	n/a	0	n/a
Independent (INDEP)	4,530	7.52	n/a	0	n/a
People's Alliance (AP)	3,792	6.29	n/a	0	n/a
People's Socialist Party–Socialist Unity (PSP–US)	2,911	4.83	n/a	0	n/a
Federation of Christian Democracy (FPD–ID)	1,331	2.21	n/a	0	n/a
Communist Party of Spain (PCE)	1,196	1.98	n/a	0	n/a
Democratic Left Front (FDI)	156	0.26	n/a	0	n/a
Blank ballots	282	0.47	n/a		
Total	60,279			3	n/a
Valid votes	60,279	98.45	n/a		
Invalid votes	951	1.55	n/a		
Votes cast / turnout	61,230	82.75	n/a		
Abstentions	12,762	17.25	n/a		
Registered voters	73,992				

== Bibliography ==
- Ley 1/1977, de 4 de enero, para la Reforma Política (Fundamental Law 1/1977). Official State Gazette (in Spanish). 4 January 1977. BOE-A-1977-165.
- Real Decreto-ley 20/1977, de 18 de marzo, sobre Normas Electorales (Royal Decree-Law 20/1977). Official State Gazette (in Spanish). 18 March 1977. BOE-A-1977-7445.
- Constitución Española (Constitution). Official State Gazette (in Spanish). 27 December 1978. BOE-A-1978-31229.
- Ley Orgánica 5/1985, de 19 de junio, del Régimen Electoral General (Organic Law 5/1985). Official State Gazette (in Spanish). 19 June 1985. BOE-A-1985-11672.
- Carreras de Odriozola, Albert; Tafunell Sambola, Xavier (2005) [1989]. Estadísticas históricas de España, siglos XIX-XX (PDF) (in Spanish). Vol. 1 (II ed.). Bilbao: Fundación BBVA. pp. 1072–1097. ISBN 84-96515-00-1. Archived from the original (PDF) on 24 September 2015.
