= 2019 Spanish local elections in Castile and León =

This article presents the results breakdown of the local elections held in Castile and León on 26 May 2019. The following tables show detailed results in the autonomous community's most populous municipalities, sorted alphabetically.

== City control ==
The following table lists party control in the most populous municipalities, including provincial capitals (shown in bold). Gains for a party are displayed with the cell's background shaded in that party's colour.

Municipality	Population	Previous control	New control
**Ávila**	57,657	People's Party (PP)	For Ávila (XAV)
**Burgos**	175,921	People's Party (PP)	Spanish Socialist Workers' Party (PSOE)
**León**	124,772	People's Party (PP)	Spanish Socialist Workers' Party (PSOE)
**Palencia**	78,629	People's Party (PP)	Citizens–Party of the Citizenry (Cs)
Ponferrada	65,239	People's Party (PP)	Spanish Socialist Workers' Party (PSOE)
**Salamanca**	143,978	People's Party (PP)	People's Party (PP)
**Segovia**	51,683	Spanish Socialist Workers' Party (PSOE)	Spanish Socialist Workers' Party (PSOE)
**Soria**	39,112	Spanish Socialist Workers' Party (PSOE)	Spanish Socialist Workers' Party (PSOE)
**Valladolid**	298,866	Spanish Socialist Workers' Party (PSOE)	Spanish Socialist Workers' Party (PSOE)
**Zamora**	61,827	United Left (IU)	United Left (IU)

== Municipalities ==
=== Ávila ===
Population: 57,657

← Summary of the 26 May 2019 City Council of Ávila election results →
Parties and alliances	Popular vote			Seats	
Parties and alliances	Votes	%	±pp	Total	+/−
For Ávila (XAV)	11,223	35.14	New	11	+11
People's Party (PP)	6,886	21.56	−11.44	6	−3
Spanish Socialist Workers' Party (PSOE)	6,177	19.34	+3.82	6	+2
Citizens–Party of the Citizenry (Cs)	2,715	8.50	−9.49	2	−3
Vox (Vox)	1,416	4.43	+2.21	0	±0
United Left–Equo (IU–Equo)	875	2.74	−7.35	0	−3
Union, Progress and Democracy (UPyD)	810	2.54	−3.48	0	−1
Citizen Deal (TC)	760	2.38	−8.00	0	−3
We Can (Podemos)	510	1.60	New	0	±0
Ávila Free of Tolls (ÁvilaLP)	368	1.15	New	0	±0
Blank ballots	201	0.63	−1.85		
Total	31,941			25	±0
Valid votes	31,941	99.32	+1.62		
Invalid votes	219	0.68	−1.62		
Votes cast / turnout	32,160	71.49	+5.73		
Abstentions	12,826	28.51	−5.73		
Registered voters	44,986				

=== Burgos ===
Population: 175,921

← Summary of the 26 May 2019 City Council of Burgos election results →
Parties and alliances	Popular vote			Seats	
Parties and alliances	Votes	%	±pp	Total	+/−
Spanish Socialist Workers' Party (PSOE)	33,094	36.20	+13.50	11	+4
People's Party (PP)	23,704	25.93	−5.50	7	−3
Citizens–Party of the Citizenry (Cs)	15,430	16.88	+2.97	5	+1
Vox (Vox)	6,558	7.17	+4.91	2	+2
We Can (Podemos)	6,066	6.64	New	2	+2
Imagine Burgos (Imagina Burgos)	4,275	4.68	−16.02	0	−6
Neighbours for Burgos (Vecinos)	786	0.86	New	0	±0
With You, We Are Democracy–Union, Progress and Democracy (CSD–UPyD)^{1}	355	0.39	−2.02	0	±0
Libertarian Party (P–LIB)	99	0.11	New	0	±0
Blank ballots	1,043	1.14	−1.10		
Total	91,410			27	±0
Valid votes	91,410	99.16	+0.94		
Invalid votes	776	0.84	−0.94		
Votes cast / turnout	92,186	67.14	+0.57		
Abstentions	45,108	32.86	−0.57		
Registered voters	137,294				
Sources
Footnotes: ^{1} With You, We Are Democracy–Union, Progress and Democracy results are compared to Union, Progress and Democracy totals in the 2015 election.

=== León ===
Population: 124,772

← Summary of the 26 May 2019 City Council of León election results →
Parties and alliances	Popular vote			Seats	
Parties and alliances	Votes	%	±pp	Total	+/−
Spanish Socialist Workers' Party (PSOE)	20,669	32.07	+7.31	10	+2
People's Party (PP)	19,083	29.61	−2.16	9	−1
Citizens–Party of the Citizenry (Cs)	9,013	13.98	+0.70	4	±0
Leonese People's Union (UPL)	6,069	9.42	+4.12	3	+2
We Can–Equo (Podemos–Equo)^{1}	3,447	5.35	−3.79	1	−1
Vox (Vox)	3,199	4.96	+4.16	0	±0
United Left (IU)^{2}	1,506	2.34	−4.76	0	−2
Act (PACT)	276	0.43	New	0	±0
Government of the People (GOPU)	179	0.28	New	0	±0
Regionalist Party of the Leonese Country (PREPAL)	162	0.25	−0.02	0	±0
Communist Party of the Workers of Spain (PCTE)	119	0.18	New	0	±0
With You, We Are Democracy (Contigo)	84	0.13	New	0	±0
Blank ballots	643	1.00	−1.26		
Total	64,449			27	±0
Valid votes	64,449	99.22	+0.93		
Invalid votes	507	0.78	−0.93		
Votes cast / turnout	64,956	63.97	+1.57		
Abstentions	36,578	36.03	−1.57		
Registered voters	101,534				
Sources
Footnotes: ^{1} We Can–Equo results are compared to the combined totals of Awake León and Equo in the 2015 election.; ^{2} United Left results are compared to León in Common totals in the 2015 election.

=== Palencia ===
Population: 78,629

← Summary of the 26 May 2019 City Council of Palencia election results →
Parties and alliances	Popular vote			Seats	
Parties and alliances	Votes	%	±pp	Total	+/−
Spanish Socialist Workers' Party (PSOE)	16,303	37.86	+7.37	11	+3
People's Party (PP)	14,366	33.36	−4.16	9	−1
Citizens–Party of the Citizenry (Cs)	5,138	11.93	+1.54	3	±0
Vox (Vox)	2,633	6.11	New	1	+1
Citizen Platform: Let's Win Palencia (GP)	2,403	5.58	−11.12	1	−3
We Can–Equo (Podemos–Equo)	1,436	3.33	New	0	±0
Castilian Party–Commoners' Land: Pact (PCAS–TC–Pacto)	242	0.56	−0.52	0	±0
Regionalist Union of Castile and León (Unión Regionalista)	87	0.20	New	0	±0
Spanish Phalanx of the CNSO (FE de las JONS)	30	0.07	−0.34	0	±0
Blank ballots	422	0.98	−0.82		
Total	43,060			25	±0
Valid votes	43,060	99.17	+0.93		
Invalid votes	360	0.83	−0.93		
Votes cast / turnout	43,420	67.76	+1.58		
Abstentions	20,657	32.24	−1.58		
Registered voters	64,077				

=== Ponferrada ===
Population: 65,239

← Summary of the 26 May 2019 City Council of Ponferrada election results →
Parties and alliances	Popular vote			Seats	
Parties and alliances	Votes	%	±pp	Total	+/−
Spanish Socialist Workers' Party (PSOE)	10,417	32.13	+11.22	9	+3
People's Party (PP)	7,436	22.94	−0.34	6	−1
Coalition for El Bierzo (CB)	2,988	9.22	+0.27	2	±0
Citizens–Party of the Citizenry (Cs)	2,660	8.21	−1.06	2	±0
Social Unity of Bierzo Electors (USE Bierzo)	2,552	7.87	−10.71	2	−3
Regionalist Party of El Bierzo (PRB)	2,374	7.32	+2.10	2	+1
We Can (Podemos)^{1}	2,308	7.12	−0.77	2	±0
United Left (IU)	773	2.38	New	0	±0
Grouped Independent Neighbours (VIAs)	243	0.75	New	0	±0
More Ponferrada (+P)	198	0.61	New	0	±0
Municipalists for Change (MxC)	143	0.44	New	0	±0
Blank ballots	327	1.01	−1.11		
Total	32,419			25	±0
Valid votes	32,419	99.07	+1.24		
Invalid votes	303	0.93	−1.24		
Votes cast / turnout	32,722	61.30	+0.78		
Abstentions	20,656	38.70	−0.78		
Registered voters	53,378				
Sources
Footnotes: ^{1} We Can results are compared to Ponferrada in Common totals in the 2015 election.

=== Salamanca ===
Population: 143,978

← Summary of the 26 May 2019 City Council of Salamanca election results →
Parties and alliances	Popular vote			Seats	
Parties and alliances	Votes	%	±pp	Total	+/−
People's Party (PP)	26,922	36.08	−3.10	11	−1
Spanish Socialist Workers' Party (PSOE)	25,365	33.99	+10.10	10	+3
Citizens–Party of the Citizenry (Cs)	11,553	15.48	+1.75	4	±0
United We Can–United Left–Equo: Let's Win Salamanca (Podemos–IU–Equo)^{1}	5,704	7.64	−6.01	2	−2
Vox (Vox)	3,392	4.55	+3.55	0	±0
With You, We Are Democracy (Contigo)	712	0.95	New	0	±0
Leonese People's Union (UPL)	141	0.19	New	0	±0
Regionalist Party of the Leonese Country (PREPAL)	125	0.17	−0.16	0	±0
Communist Party of the Workers of Spain (PCTE)	117	0.16	New	0	±0
Blank ballots	590	0.79	−1.32		
Total	74,621			27	±0
Valid votes	74,621	99.26	+0.86		
Invalid votes	555	0.74	−0.86		
Votes cast / turnout	75,176	63.37	+1.54		
Abstentions	43,460	36.63	−1.54		
Registered voters	118,636				
Sources
Footnotes: ^{1} United We Can–United Left–Equo: Let's Win Salamanca results are compared to Let's Win Salamanca totals in the 2015 election.

=== Segovia ===
Population: 51,683

← Summary of the 26 May 2019 City Council of Segovia election results →
Parties and alliances	Popular vote			Seats	
Parties and alliances	Votes	%	±pp	Total	+/−
Spanish Socialist Workers' Party (PSOE)	8,919	33.29	−6.74	10	−2
People's Party (PP)	8,434	31.48	+2.24	9	+1
Citizens–Party of the Citizenry (Cs)	3,544	13.23	+6.01	3	+1
United Left (IU)	1,979	7.39	+2.13	2	+1
We Can–Equo (Podemos–Equo)	1,393	5.20	New	1	+1
Vox (Vox)	1,295	4.83	+3.72	0	±0
Centered (centrados)	938	3.50	New	0	±0
Castilian Party–Commoners' Land: Pact (PCAS–TC–Pacto)	80	0.30	−0.24	0	±0
Union, Progress and Democracy (UPyD)	n/a	n/a	−6.63	0	−2
Blank ballots	213	0.79	−0.82		
Total	26,795			25	±0
Valid votes	26,795	99.17	+0.87		
Invalid votes	225	0.83	−0.87		
Votes cast / turnout	27,020	68.44	+1.96		
Abstentions	12,460	31.56	−1.96		
Registered voters	39,480				

=== Soria ===
Population: 39,112

← Summary of the 26 May 2019 City Council of Soria election results →
Parties and alliances	Popular vote			Seats	
Parties and alliances	Votes	%	±pp	Total	+/−
Spanish Socialist Workers' Party (PSOE)	9,310	49.52	+2.53	12	+1
People's Party (PP)	4,353	23.15	−5.91	6	−1
Citizens–Party of the Citizenry (Cs)	1,592	8.47	+0.32	2	+1
We Can (Podemos)	1,160	6.17	New	1	+1
Soria in Common (En Común)^{1}	741	3.94	−9.79	0	−2
Vox (Vox)	736	3.91	New	0	±0
Sorian People's Platform (PPSO)	660	3.51	New	0	±0
Blank ballots	250	1.33	−0.73		
Total	18,802			21	±0
Valid votes	18,802	98.98	+0.88		
Invalid votes	193	1.02	−0.88		
Votes cast / turnout	18,995	63.03	±0.00		
Abstentions	11,141	36.97	±0.00		
Registered voters	30,136				
Sources
Footnotes: ^{1} Soria in Common results are compared to the combined totals of Sorian People and United Left in the 2015 election.

=== Valladolid ===
Population: 298,866

← Summary of the 26 May 2019 City Council of Valladolid election results →
Parties and alliances	Popular vote			Seats	
Parties and alliances	Votes	%	±pp	Total	+/−
Spanish Socialist Workers' Party (PSOE)	60,107	35.68	+12.40	11	+3
People's Party (PP)	50,684	30.08	−5.65	9	−3
Citizens–Party of the Citizenry (Cs)	21,209	12.59	+4.96	3	+1
Valladolid Takes the Floor (Toma la Palabra)	17,649	10.48	−2.92	3	−1
Vox (Vox)	10,695	6.35	+5.28	1	+1
We Can (Podemos)^{1}	5,016	2.98	−6.98	0	−3
Animalist Party Against Mistreatment of Animals (PACMA)	831	0.49	New	0	±0
Castilian Party–Commoners' Land: Pact (PCAS–TC–Pacto)	256	0.15	−0.07	0	±0
Communist Party of the Workers of Spain (PCTE)	230	0.14	New	0	±0
Independent Candidacy–Citizens of Democratic Centre (CI–CCD)	205	0.12	−3.94	0	±0
Internationalist Solidarity and Self-Management (SAIn)	135	0.08	−0.12	0	±0
Regionalist Union of Castile and León (Unión Regionalista)^{2}	126	0.07	−0.09	0	±0
Spanish Phalanx of the CNSO (FE de las JONS)	119	0.07	−0.10	0	±0
With You, We Are Democracy (Contigo)	81	0.05	New	0	±0
Blank ballots	1,131	0.67	−0.93		
Total	168,474			27	−2
Valid votes	168,474	99.46	+0.63		
Invalid votes	916	0.54	−0.63		
Votes cast / turnout	169,390	69.12	+1.32		
Abstentions	75,674	30.88	−1.32		
Registered voters	245,064				
Sources
Footnotes: ^{1} We Can results are compared to Yes We Can Valladolid totals in the 2015 election.; ^{2} Regionalist Union of Castile and León results are compared to Regionalist Democracy of Castile and León totals in the 2015 election.

=== Zamora ===
Population: 61,827

← Summary of the 26 May 2019 City Council of Zamora election results →
Parties and alliances	Popular vote			Seats	
Parties and alliances	Votes	%	±pp	Total	+/−
United Left (IU)	16,038	48.08	+18.98	14	+6
People's Party (PP)	6,834	20.49	−11.89	6	−4
Spanish Socialist Workers' Party (PSOE)	3,918	11.74	−5.23	3	−2
Citizens–Party of the Citizenry (Cs)	2,726	8.17	−0.43	2	±0
Vox (Vox)	1,481	4.44	New	0	±0
For Zamora (Por Zamora)	1,124	3.37	New	0	±0
Decide Now (Ahora Decide)	553	1.66	−0.18	0	±0
We Can (Podemos)	311	0.93	New	0	±0
Leonese People's Union (UPL)	78	0.23	−0.18	0	±0
Regionalist Party of the Leonese Country (PREPAL)	33	0.10	−0.29	0	±0
Blank ballots	264	0.79	−0.95		
Total	33,360			25	±0
Valid votes	33,360	99.39	+0.98		
Invalid votes	206	0.61	−0.98		
Votes cast / turnout	33,566	65.49	+3.64		
Abstentions	17,685	34.51	−3.64		
Registered voters	51,251				

== See also ==
- 2019 Castilian-Leonese regional election
