= 2011 Spanish local elections in Castile and León =

This article presents the results breakdown of the local elections held in Castile and León on 22 May 2011. The following tables show detailed results in the autonomous community's most populous municipalities, sorted alphabetically.

== City control ==
The following table lists party control in the most populous municipalities, including provincial capitals (shown in bold). Gains for a party are displayed with the cell's background shaded in that party's colour.

Municipality	Population	Previous control	New control
**Ávila**	58,245	People's Party (PP)	People's Party (PP)
**Burgos**	178,574	People's Party (PP)	People's Party (PP)
**León**	134,012	Spanish Socialist Workers' Party (PSOE)	People's Party (PP)
**Palencia**	82,169	Spanish Socialist Workers' Party (PSOE)	People's Party (PP)
Ponferrada	68,767	People's Party (PP)	People's Party (PP) (USE Bierzo in 2013)
**Salamanca**	154,462	People's Party (PP)	People's Party (PP)
**Segovia**	55,748	Spanish Socialist Workers' Party (PSOE)	Spanish Socialist Workers' Party (PSOE)
**Soria**	39,838	Spanish Socialist Workers' Party (PSOE)	Spanish Socialist Workers' Party (PSOE)
**Valladolid**	315,522	People's Party (PP)	People's Party (PP)
**Zamora**	65,998	People's Party (PP)	People's Party (PP)

== Municipalities ==
=== Ávila ===
Population: 58,245

← Summary of the 22 May 2011 City Council of Ávila election results →
Parties and alliances	Popular vote			Seats	
Parties and alliances	Votes	%	±pp	Total	+/−
People's Party (PP)	14,732	51.70	−8.44	14	−2
Spanish Socialist Workers' Party (PSOE)	4,944	17.35	−9.42	4	−3
Union, Progress and Democracy (UPyD)	4,062	14.26	New	4	+4
United Left of Castile and León (IUCyL)	2,977	10.45	+1.05	3	+1
The Party of Castile and León–Independent Candidacy (PCL–CI)	664	2.33	New	0	±0
Blank ballots	1,116	3.92	+1.39		
Total	28,495			25	±0
Valid votes	28,495	97.45	−1.49		
Invalid votes	745	2.55	+1.49		
Votes cast / turnout	29,240	65.94	+0.41		
Abstentions	15,105	34.06	−0.41		
Registered voters	44,345				

=== Burgos ===
Population: 178,574

← Summary of the 22 May 2011 City Council of Burgos election results →
Parties and alliances	Popular vote			Seats	
Parties and alliances	Votes	%	±pp	Total	+/−
People's Party (PP)	40,738	46.19	−1.55	15	±0
Spanish Socialist Workers' Party (PSOE)	22,552	25.57	−8.64	8	−2
Union, Progress and Democracy (UPyD)	10,418	11.81	New	3	+3
United Left of Castile and León (IUCyL)	4,531	5.14	+0.52	1	+1
Party of Castile and León (PCAL)^{1}	2,023	2.29	+0.35	0	±0
Citizens of Burgos for Old Castile (CiBu)	1,527	1.73	+0.81	0	±0
National Democracy (DN)	1,136	1.29	+0.78	0	±0
The Greens–Green Group (LV–GV)	1,048	1.19	New	0	±0
Internationalist Solidarity and Self-Management (SAIn)	497	0.56	New	0	±0
For a Fairer World (PUM+J)	492	0.56	New	0	±0
Independent Solution (SI)	n/a	n/a	−6.46	0	−2
Blank ballots	3,243	3.68	+1.32		
Total	88,205			27	±0
Valid votes	88,205	98.19	−1.20		
Invalid votes	1,623	1.81	+1.20		
Votes cast / turnout	89,828	65.46	−1.85		
Abstentions	47,402	34.54	+1.85		
Registered voters	137,230				
Sources
Footnotes: ^{1} Party of Castile and León results are compared to Commoners' Land–Alternative for Castile and León totals in the 2007 election.

=== León ===
Population: 134,012

← Summary of the 22 May 2011 City Council of León election results →
Parties and alliances	Popular vote			Seats	
Parties and alliances	Votes	%	±pp	Total	+/−
People's Party (PP)	29,932	44.61	+7.04	15	+4
Spanish Socialist Workers' Party (PSOE)	20,786	30.98	−13.19	10	−3
Leonese People's Union (UPL)	4,615	6.88	−3.96	2	−1
United Left of Castile and León (IUCyL)	2,793	4.16	+2.74	0	±0
Union, Progress and Democracy (UPyD)	2,113	3.15	New	0	±0
Leonese Autonomist Party–Leonesist Unity (PAL–UL)	1,581	2.36	−0.01	0	±0
Social Alternative Movement (MASS)	901	1.34	New	0	±0
Civiqus (Civiqus)	756	1.13	New	0	±0
Ecolo–Greens (Ecolo)	454	0.68	New	0	±0
Regionalist Party of the Leonese Country (PREPAL)	250	0.37	+0.20	0	±0
The Phalanx (FE)	115	0.17	+0.05	0	±0
Communist Party of the Peoples of Spain (PCPE)	100	0.15	New	0	±0
Ambulating Traders and Ethnic Minorities (CAME)	92	0.14	New	0	±0
Party of El Bierzo (PB)	37	0.06	+0.02	0	±0
Blank ballots	2,567	3.83	+1.63		
Total	67,092			27	±0
Valid votes	67,092	97.51	−1.77		
Invalid votes	1,710	2.49	+1.77		
Votes cast / turnout	68,802	64.58	+1.51		
Abstentions	37,739	35.42	−1.51		
Registered voters	106,541				

=== Palencia ===
Population: 82,169

← Summary of the 22 May 2011 City Council of Palencia election results →
Parties and alliances	Popular vote			Seats	
Parties and alliances	Votes	%	±pp	Total	+/−
People's Party (PP)	21,383	49.31	+8.95	14	+3
Spanish Socialist Workers' Party (PSOE)	16,071	37.06	−10.99	10	−3
United Left of Castile and León (IUCyL)	2,954	6.81	+1.63	1	±0
Union, Progress and Democracy (UPyD)	1,013	2.34	New	0	±0
Party of Castile and León (PCAL)^{1}	830	1.91	+0.49	0	±0
Blank ballots	1,116	2.57	+0.47		
Total	43,367			25	±0
Valid votes	43,367	98.37	−0.86		
Invalid votes	717	1.63	+0.86		
Votes cast / turnout	44,084	66.61	+0.07		
Abstentions	22,100	33.39	−0.07		
Registered voters	66,184				
Sources
Footnotes: ^{1} Party of Castile and León results are compared to Commoners' Land–Alternative for Castile and León totals in the 2007 election.

=== Ponferrada ===
Population: 68,767

← Summary of the 22 May 2011 City Council of Ponferrada election results →
Parties and alliances	Popular vote			Seats	
Parties and alliances	Votes	%	±pp	Total	+/−
People's Party (PP)	13,482	38.96	−10.20	12	−2
Spanish Socialist Workers' Party (PSOE)	8,443	24.40	−5.37	8	−1
Grouped Independents of Ponferrada (IAP)	5,719	16.53	New	5	+5
United Left of Castile and León (IUCyL)	1,700	4.91	−0.08	0	±0
Party of El Bierzo (PB)	1,466	4.24	−0.45	0	±0
Social Alternative Movement (MASS)^{1}	1,244	3.59	−3.09	0	−2
Regionalist Party of El Bierzo (PRB)	906	2.62	−0.33	0	±0
Union, Progress and Democracy (UPyD)	340	0.98	New	0	±0
Leonese People's Union (UPL)	288	0.83	New	0	±0
Ecolo–Greens (Ecolo)	259	0.75	New	0	±0
State of Spain Unionist Party (PUEDE)	16	0.05	New	0	±0
Blank ballots	741	2.14	+0.38		
Total	34,604			25	±0
Valid votes	34,604	98.39	−0.99		
Invalid votes	565	1.61	+0.99		
Votes cast / turnout	35,169	64.34	−1.17		
Abstentions	19,489	35.66	+1.17		
Registered voters	54,658				
Sources
Footnotes: ^{1} Social Alternative Movement results are compared to Social Alternative Movement–Leonese People's Union totals in the 2007 election.

=== Salamanca ===
Population: 154,462

← Summary of the 22 May 2011 City Council of Salamanca election results →
Parties and alliances	Popular vote			Seats	
Parties and alliances	Votes	%	±pp	Total	+/−
People's Party (PP)	40,340	52.93	+2.47	18	+2
Spanish Socialist Workers' Party (PSOE)	22,018	28.89	−7.61	9	−2
Union, Progress and Democracy (UPyD)	3,246	4.26	New	0	±0
United Left of Castile and León (IUCyL)	2,506	3.29	−0.29	0	±0
Yes for Salamanca (UPSa–C's)^{1}	1,898	2.49	−3.83	0	±0
Greens of Salamanca (LV)	1,813	2.38	New	0	±0
The Left of Salamanca (IzSa)	1,118	1.47	New	0	±0
Citizens for Blank Votes (CenB)	523	0.69	New	0	±0
Anti-Bullfighting Party Against Mistreatment of Animals (PACMA)	253	0.33	New	0	±0
Regionalist Party of the Leonese Country (PREPAL)	184	0.24	+0.06	0	±0
Engine and Sports Alternative (AMD)	121	0.16	New	0	±0
Blank ballots	2,194	2.88	+0.78		
Total	76,214			27	±0
Valid votes	76,214	98.46	−0.90		
Invalid votes	1,191	1.54	+0.90		
Votes cast / turnout	77,405	62.57	+0.75		
Abstentions	46,301	37.43	−0.75		
Registered voters	123,706				
Sources
Footnotes: ^{1} Yes for Salamanca results are compared to Union of the Salamancan People totals in the 2007 election.

=== Segovia ===
Population: 55,748

← Summary of the 22 May 2011 City Council of Segovia election results →
Parties and alliances	Popular vote			Seats	
Parties and alliances	Votes	%	±pp	Total	+/−
People's Party (PP)	12,122	42.63	−0.44	12	±0
Spanish Socialist Workers' Party (PSOE)	12,017	42.26	−2.23	12	−1
United Left of Castile and León (IUCyL)	1,572	5.53	+1.32	1	+1
Union, Progress and Democracy (UPyD)	1,353	4.76	New	0	±0
Left Segovia (SdI)	398	1.40	New	0	±0
Greens and Castilians (LV–PCAL)^{1}	382	1.34	−1.22	0	±0
Blank ballots	594	2.09	+0.22		
Total	28,438			25	±0
Valid votes	28,438	98.56	−0.65		
Invalid votes	416	1.44	+0.65		
Votes cast / turnout	28,854	70.90	+1.38		
Abstentions	11,843	29.10	−1.38		
Registered voters	40,697				
Sources
Footnotes: ^{1} Greens and Castilians results are compared to the combined totals of The Greens and Commoners' Land–Alternative for Castile and León in the 2007 election.

=== Soria ===
Population: 39,838

← Summary of the 22 May 2011 City Council of Soria election results →
Parties and alliances	Popular vote			Seats	
Parties and alliances	Votes	%	±pp	Total	+/−
Spanish Socialist Workers' Party (PSOE)	8,382	46.08	+3.49	12	+3
People's Party (PP)	6,395	35.16	−4.40	9	±0
United Left of Castile and León (IUCyL)	895	4.92	−0.59	0	−1
Initiative for the Development of Soria (IDES)	779	4.28	−6.76	0	−2
Citizens–Party of the Citizenry (C's)	516	2.84	New	0	±0
Sorian People's Platform (PPSO)	380	2.09	New	0	±0
Union, Progress and Democracy (UPyD)	154	0.85	New	0	±0
Blank ballots	689	3.79	+2.50		
Total	18,190			21	±0
Valid votes	18,190	98.12	+1.83		
Invalid votes	348	1.88	−1.83		
Votes cast / turnout	18,538	63.40	−0.08		
Abstentions	10,704	36.60	+0.08		
Registered voters	29,242				

=== Valladolid ===
Population: 315,522

← Summary of the 22 May 2011 City Council of Valladolid election results →
Parties and alliances	Popular vote			Seats	
Parties and alliances	Votes	%	±pp	Total	+/−
People's Party (PP)	85,006	50.41	+2.60	17	+2
Spanish Socialist Workers' Party (PSOE)	45,525	27.00	−12.04	9	−4
United Left of Castile and León (IUCyL)	17,727	10.51	+4.62	3	+2
Union, Progress and Democracy (UPyD)	6,967	4.13	New	0	±0
The Party of Castile and León–Independent Candidacy (PCL–CI)	4,488	2.66	−0.46	0	±0
Citizens for Blank Votes (CenB)	1,026	0.61	New	0	±0
Party of Castile and León (PCAL)^{1}	737	0.44	−0.06	0	±0
Anti-Bullfighting Party Against Mistreatment of Animals (PACMA)	730	0.43	+0.22	0	±0
Spanish Phalanx of the CNSO (FE de las JONS)	445	0.26	+0.12	0	±0
Internationalist Solidarity and Self-Management (SAIn)	390	0.23	+0.08	0	±0
Communist Party of the Castilian People (PCPC)	339	0.20	+0.05	0	±0
Humanist Party (PH)	314	0.19	+0.12	0	±0
Family and Life Party (PFyV)	236	0.14	New	0	±0
Regionalist Unity of Castile and León (URCL)	235	0.14	+0.03	0	±0
Blank ballots	4,477	2.65	+0.83		
Total	168,642			29	±0
Valid votes	168,642	98.58	−0.89		
Invalid votes	2,435	1.42	+0.89		
Votes cast / turnout	171,077	67.70	−1.41		
Abstentions	81,617	32.30	+1.41		
Registered voters	252,694				
Sources
Footnotes: ^{1} Party of Castile and León results are compared to Commoners' Land–Alternative for Castile and León totals in the 2007 election.

=== Zamora ===
Population: 65,998

← Summary of the 22 May 2011 City Council of Zamora election results →
Parties and alliances	Popular vote			Seats	
Parties and alliances	Votes	%	±pp	Total	+/−
People's Party (PP)	15,400	46.93	+3.11	14	+2
Spanish Socialist Workers' Party (PSOE)	7,618	23.21	−8.31	6	−2
United Left of Castile and León (IUCyL)	5,296	16.14	+2.76	4	+1
Zamoran Independent Electors–Zamoran People's Union (ADEIZA–UPZ)	1,998	6.09	−1.41	1	−1
Union, Progress and Democracy (UPyD)	912	2.78	New	0	±0
Citizens for Blank Votes (CenB)	350	1.07	New	0	±0
Leonese People's Union (UPL)^{1}	175	0.53	+0.15	0	±0
Regionalist Party of the Leonese Country (PREPAL)	154	0.47	+0.07	0	±0
Blank ballots	914	2.79	+1.52		
Total	32,817			25	±0
Valid votes	32,817	98.48	−0.84		
Invalid votes	507	1.52	+0.84		
Votes cast / turnout	33,324	61.84	+0.41		
Abstentions	20,564	38.16	−0.41		
Registered voters	53,888				
Sources
Footnotes: ^{1} Leonese People's Union results are compared to United Zamora–Leonese People's Union totals in the 2007 election.

== See also ==
- 2011 Castilian-Leonese regional election
