= Opinion polling for the 2019 Spanish local elections (Castile and León) =

In the run up to the 2019 Spanish local elections, various organisations carried out opinion polling to gauge voting intention in local entities in Spain. Results of such polls for municipalities in Castile and León are displayed in this article. The date range for these opinion polls is from the previous local elections, held on 24 May 2015, to the day the next elections were held, on 26 May 2019.

Polls are listed in reverse chronological order, showing the most recent first and using the dates when the survey fieldwork was done, as opposed to the date of publication. Where the fieldwork dates are unknown, the date of publication is given instead. The highest percentage figure in each polling survey is displayed with its background shaded in the leading party's colour. If a tie ensues, this is applied to the figures with the highest percentages. The "Lead" columns on the right shows the percentage-point difference between the parties with the highest percentages in a given poll.

== Municipalities ==
=== Bembibre ===
Polling firm/Commissioner	Fieldwork date	Sample size	Turnout	PP	PSOE	CB	IUCyL	Cs	UPL	Vox	Lead
2019 municipal election	26 May 2019	—N/a	68.3	22.4; 3	46.4; 7	6.8; 1	2.3; 0	15.6; 2	4.8; 0	1.2; 0	24.0
Huaris CC/InfoBierzo (Note: Undecided and/or abstentionists excluded.)	6–10 May 2019	368	?	27.1; 4	39.9; 6/7	4.4; 0/1	4.8; 0/1	17.2; 2	4.8; 0/1	2.1; 0	12.8
2015 municipal election	24 May 2015	—N/a	65.7	46.3; 7	35.9; 5	10.9; 1	5.1; 0	–	–	–	10.4

=== Benavente ===
Polling firm/Commissioner	Fieldwork date	Sample size	Turnout	PP	PSOE	IUCyL	UPL	Cs	Vox	Lead
2019 municipal election	26 May 2019	—N/a	63.7	29.7; 6	40.0; 8	6.9; 1	2.6; 0	13.5; 2	3.5; 0	10.3
Ipsos/La Opinión	13–16 May 2019	341	70	22.5; 4	40.9; 7/8	11.5; 2	3.6; 0	13.8; 2/3	5.3; 0/1	18.4
2015 municipal election	24 May 2015	—N/a	63.8	36.0; 8	27.8; 6	15.6; 3	4.9; 0	3.8; 0	–	8.2

=== Burgos ===
Polling firm/Commissioner	Fieldwork date	Sample size	Turnout	PP	PSOE	IB	Cs	Vox	Podemos	Lead
2019 municipal election	26 May 2019	—N/a	67.1	25.9; 7	36.2; 11	4.7; 0	16.9; 5	7.2; 2	6.6; 2	10.3
GAD3/El Norte de Castilla	12–14 Mar 2019	400	?	31.7; 10	29.9; 9/10	13.9; 3/4	13.2; 3/4	4.7; 0/1	(Note: Within Imagina Burgos.)	1.8
2015 municipal election	24 May 2015	—N/a	66.6	31.4; 10	22.7; 7	20.7; 6	13.9; 4	2.3; 0		8.7

=== Cacabelos ===
Polling firm/Commissioner	Fieldwork date	Sample size	Turnout	PP	PSOE	Podemos	IUCyL	SxC	Cs	CB	Lead
2019 municipal election	26 May 2019	—N/a	71.6	33.1; 5	25.7; 4	2.1; 0	13.0; 2	15.8; 2	6.2; 0	3.0; 0	7.4
Huaris CC/InfoBierzo	6–10 May 2019	355	?	18.1; 3	34.0; 4/5	6.4; 0/1	11.7; 1/2	13.9; 1/2	9.6; 1	6.4; 0/1	15.9
2015 municipal election	24 May 2015	—N/a	74.0	39.9; 6	39.0; 5	10.9; 1	6.9; 1	–	–	–	0.9

=== Fabero ===
Polling firm/Commissioner	Fieldwork date	Sample size	Turnout	PSOE	IUCyL	Cs	CB	PP	Lead
2019 municipal election	26 May 2019	—N/a	75.0	53.1; 7	12.0; 1	0.7; 0	4.8; 0	28.2; 3	24.9
Huaris CC/InfoBierzo	6–10 May 2019	354	?	71.2	13.5	2.9	1.9	10.7	57.7
2015 municipal election	24 May 2015	—N/a	77.3	45.1; 6	18.9; 2	18.8; 2	9.1; 1	6.6; 0	26.2

=== La Bañeza ===
Polling firm/Commissioner	Fieldwork date	Sample size	Turnout	PSOE	PP	Podemos	UPL	Cs	Vox	Lead
2019 municipal election	26 May 2019	—N/a	67.5	33.7; 6	34.8; 6	5.0; 1	1.7; 0	18.2; 3	5.7; 1	1.1
SyM Consulting/Ibañeza.es	29–30 Apr 2019	376	?	? 8/9	? 3/4	? 1	<5.0; 0	15.2; 2/3	? 1	?
2015 municipal election	24 May 2015	—N/a	62.2	45.5; 9	32.6; 6	11.1; 2	4.8; 0	3.6; 0	–	12.9

=== León ===
Polling firm/Commissioner	Fieldwork date	Sample size	Turnout	PP	PSOE	Cs	Podemos	IU	UPL	Vox	Lead
2019 municipal election	26 May 2019	—N/a	64.0	29.6; 9	32.1; 10	14.0; 4	5.3; 1	2.3; 0	9.4; 3	5.0; 0	2.5
Celeste-Tel/Diario de León	7–15 May 2019	550	66.5	23.6; 7	29.3; 9	18.8; 6	7.8; 2	5.1; 1	6.1; 1	5.1; 1	5.7
SyM Consulting/La Nueva Crónica	10–12 May 2019	516	67.6	23.2; 7	23.3; 7	11.7; 3/4	11.4; 3	5.7; 1/2	10.3; 3	8.3; 2	0.1
GAD3/Leonoticias	12–14 Mar 2019	400	?	31.1; 10	26.9; 9	10.5; 3	5.6; 1	4.2; 0/1	8.4; 1/2	6.6; 1/2	4.2
2015 municipal election	24 May 2015	—N/a	62.4	31.8; 10	24.8; 8	13.3; 4	8.2 (Note: Results for León Despierta.); 2	7.1; 2	5.3; 1	0.8; 0	7.0

=== Ponferrada ===
Polling firm/Commissioner	Fieldwork date	Sample size	Turnout	PP	PSOE	USE	Cs	CB	PeC	PRB	Vox	Podemos	IU	MxC	VIAs	+P	Lead
2019 municipal election	26 May 2019	—N/a	61.3	22.9; 6	32.1; 9	7.9; 2	8.2; 2	9.2; 2	–	7.3; 2	–	7.1; 2	2.4; 0	0.4; 0	0.7; 0	0.6; 0	9.2
Celeste-Tel/Diario de León	9–16 May 2019	400	61.9	21.6; 6	30.9; 9	14.2; 4	12.8; 3	6.9; 2	–	3.2; 0	–	6.1; 1	1.1; 0	1.6; 0	–	1.5; 0	9.3
Huaris CC/InfoBierzo	6–15 May 2019	817	?	18.7; 6	35.0; 8	9.2; 2/3	9.6; 2/3	9.8; 3	–	4.0; 0/1	–	8.0; 2	2.8; 0	1.2; 0	–	1.7; 0	16.3
ECD/BierzoDiario	4–13 May 2019	670	?	19.2; 6	24.5; 8	9.0; 2/3	11.9; 3	8.0; 2	–	3.4; 0	–	10.2; 3	4.9; 0/1	3.9; 0	2.2; 0	1.9; 0	5.3
SyM Consulting/La Nueva Crónica	10–12 May 2019	372	61.5	20.8; 6	27.5; 7/8	7.0; 2	5.0; 1	12.6; 3/4	–	5.6; 1	–	16.0; 4	–	–	–	–	6.7
ECD/BierzoDiario	15–24 Feb 2019	400	?	21.2; 6	22.8; 6/7	6.3; 1/2	14.5; 4	9.8; 2	–	3.5; 0	8.2; 2	12.6; 3	–	–	–	–	1.6
ECD/BierzoDiario	5–12 Jun 2018	400	?	23.1; 6/7	24.2; 7	9.0; 2	15.6; 4	9.8; 2/3	11.3; 3	3.9; 0	–	(Note: Within Ponferrada en Común.)		–	–	–	1.1
2015 municipal election	24 May 2015	—N/a	60.5	23.3; 7	20.9; 6	18.6; 5	9.3; 2	9.0; 2	7.9; 2	5.2; 1	0.8; 0			–	–	–	2.4

=== Salamanca ===
Polling firm/Commissioner	Fieldwork date	Sample size	Turnout	PP	PSOE	Cs	Unidas Podemos	Vox	Lead
2019 municipal election	26 May 2019	—N/a	63.4	36.1; 11	34.0; 10	15.5; 4	7.6; 2	4.5; 0	2.1
USAL/Salamanca24horas	19 May 2019	756	65	? 9/11	? 8/10	? 6/8	? 2/4	? 0/2	?
Charromanía	4–8 Jan 2019	403	?	26.4; 8	27.9; 8	18.0; 5	12.2; 3	12.2; 3	1.5
2015 municipal election	24 May 2015	—N/a	61.8	39.2; 12	23.9; 7	13.7; 4	13.6 (Note: Results for Ganemos Salamanca.); 4	1.0; 0	15.3

=== Segovia ===
Polling firm/Commissioner	Fieldwork date	Sample size	Turnout	PSOE	PP	Cs	UPyD	IU	Vox	Podemos	Centrados	Lead
2019 municipal election	26 May 2019	—N/a	68.4	33.3; 10	31.5; 9	13.2; 3	–	7.4; 2	4.8; 0	5.2; 1	3.5; 0	1.8
SegoviaDirecto.com	6–10 May 2019	1,000	?	29.5; 8	26.1; 7	15.4; 4	–	5.7; 1	7.2; 2	6.5; 1	7.0; 2	3.4
2015 municipal election	24 May 2015	—N/a	66.5	40.0; 12	29.2; 8	7.2; 2	6.6; 2	5.3; 1	1.1; 0	–	–	10.8

=== Toro ===
Polling firm/Commissioner	Fieldwork date	Sample size	Turnout	PSOE	PP	Cs	Lead
2019 municipal election	26 May 2019	—N/a	69.1	51.2; 8	24.8; 3	18.3; 2	26.4
Ipsos/La Opinión	13–16 May 2019	245	71	61.0; 8/9	21.7; 3	14.5; 1/2	39.3
2015 municipal election	24 May 2015	—N/a	71.3	59.6; 9	30.6; 4	5.1; 0	29.0

=== Valladolid ===
Polling firm/Commissioner	Fieldwork date	Sample size	Turnout	PP	PSOE	VTLP	Podemos	Cs	Vox	Lead
2019 municipal election	26 May 2019	—N/a	69.1	30.1; 9	35.7; 11	10.5; 3	3.0; 0	12.6; 3	6.3; 1	5.6
GAD3/El Norte de Castilla	12–14 Mar 2019	502	?	28.6; 8/9	39.9; 12/13	4.8; 0/1	5.8; 1/2	10.1; 2/3	5.8; 1/2	11.3
2015 municipal election	24 May 2015	—N/a	67.8	35.7; 12	23.3; 8	13.4; 4	10.0 (Note: Results for SÍVA.); 3	7.6; 2	1.1; 0	12.4

=== Zamora ===
Polling firm/Commissioner	Fieldwork date	Sample size	Turnout	PP	IU	PSOE	Cs	Lead
2019 municipal election	26 May 2019	—N/a	65.5	20.5; 6	48.1; 14	11.7; 3	8.2; 2	27.6
Ipsos/La Opinión	13–16 May 2019	667	67	20.8; 5/6	44.7; 11/13	15.6; 4/5	12.1; 3	23.9
2015 municipal election	24 May 2015	—N/a	61.9	32.4; 10	29.1; 8	17.0; 5	8.6; 2	3.3
