= 2015 Spanish local elections in Castile and León =

This article presents the results breakdown of the local elections held in Castile and León on 24 May 2015. The following tables show detailed results in the autonomous community's most populous municipalities, sorted alphabetically.

== City control ==
The following table lists party control in the most populous municipalities, including provincial capitals (shown in bold). Gains for a party are displayed with the cell's background shaded in that party's colour.

Municipality	Population	Previous control	New control
**Ávila**	58,933	People's Party (PP)	People's Party (PP)
**Burgos**	177,776	People's Party (PP)	People's Party (PP)
**León**	129,551	People's Party (PP)	People's Party (PP)
**Palencia**	80,178	People's Party (PP)	People's Party (PP)
Ponferrada	67,367	Social Unity of Bierzo Electors (USE Bierzo)	People's Party (PP)
**Salamanca**	148,042	People's Party (PP)	People's Party (PP)
**Segovia**	53,260	Spanish Socialist Workers' Party (PSOE)	Spanish Socialist Workers' Party (PSOE)
**Soria**	39,516	Spanish Socialist Workers' Party (PSOE)	Spanish Socialist Workers' Party (PSOE)
**Valladolid**	306,830	People's Party (PP)	Spanish Socialist Workers' Party (PSOE)
**Zamora**	64,423	People's Party (PP)	United Left of Castile and León (IUCyL)

== Municipalities ==
=== Ávila ===
Population: 58,933

← Summary of the 24 May 2015 City Council of Ávila election results →
Parties and alliances	Popular vote			Seats	
Parties and alliances	Votes	%	±pp	Total	+/−
People's Party (PP)	9,508	33.00	−18.70	9	−5
Citizens–Party of the Citizenry (C's)	5,183	17.99	New	5	+5
Spanish Socialist Workers' Party (PSOE)	4,470	15.52	−1.83	4	±0
Citizen Deal (Trato Ciudadano)	2,989	10.38	New	3	+3
United Left of Castile and León (IUCyL)	2,906	10.09	−0.36	3	±0
Union, Progress and Democracy (UPyD)	1,734	6.02	−8.24	1	−3
Decide Now (Ahora Decide)	665	2.31	New	0	±0
Vox (Vox)	639	2.22	New	0	±0
Blank ballots	715	2.48	−1.44		
Total	28,809			25	±0
Valid votes	28,809	97.70	+0.25		
Invalid votes	677	2.30	−0.25		
Votes cast / turnout	29,486	65.76	−0.18		
Abstentions	15,355	34.24	+0.18		
Registered voters	44,841				

=== Burgos ===
Population: 177,776

← Summary of the 24 May 2015 City Council of Burgos election results →
Parties and alliances	Popular vote			Seats	
Parties and alliances	Votes	%	±pp	Total	+/−
People's Party (PP)	28,216	31.43	−14.76	10	−5
Spanish Socialist Workers' Party (PSOE)	20,386	22.70	−2.87	7	−1
Imagine Burgos (Imagina Burgos)^{1}	18,589	20.70	+15.56	6	+5
Citizens–Party of the Citizenry (C's)	12,492	13.91	New	4	+4
Burgos Progress (PORBUR)	2,436	2.71	New	0	±0
Union, Progress and Democracy (UPyD)	2,167	2.41	−9.40	0	−3
Vox (Vox)	2,032	2.26	New	0	±0
Castilian Party–Commoners' Land: Pact (PCAS–TC–Pacto)	895	1.00	−1.29	0	±0
Internationalist Solidarity and Self-Management (SAIn)	562	0.63	+0.07	0	±0
Blank ballots	2,013	2.24	−1.44		
Total	89,788			27	±0
Valid votes	89,788	98.22	+0.03		
Invalid votes	1,628	1.78	−0.03		
Votes cast / turnout	91,416	66.57	+1.11		
Abstentions	45,907	33.43	−1.11		
Registered voters	137,323				
Sources
Footnotes: ^{1} Imagine Burgos results are compared to United Left of Castile and León totals in the 2011 election.

=== León ===
Population: 129,551

← Summary of the 24 May 2015 City Council of León election results →
Parties and alliances	Popular vote			Seats	
Parties and alliances	Votes	%	±pp	Total	+/−
People's Party (PP)	20,314	31.77	−12.84	10	−5
Spanish Socialist Workers' Party (PSOE)	15,833	24.76	−6.22	8	−2
Citizens–Party of the Citizenry (C's)	8,489	13.28	New	4	+4
Awake León (León Despierta)	5,227	8.17	New	2	+2
León in Common (León en Común)^{1}	4,537	7.10	+2.94	2	+2
Leonese People's Union (UPL)	3,391	5.30	−1.58	1	−1
Leonese Autonomist Party–Leonesist Unity (PAL–UL)	1,182	1.85	−0.51	0	±0
Union, Progress and Democracy (UPyD)	791	1.24	−1.91	0	±0
Animalist Party Against Mistreatment of Animals (PACMA)	751	1.17	New	0	±0
Equo (Equo)	622	0.97	New	0	±0
Vox (Vox)	511	0.80	New	0	±0
Communist Party of the Peoples of Spain (PCPE)	422	0.66	+0.51	0	±0
National Democracy (DN)	202	0.32	New	0	±0
Regionalist Party of the Leonese Country (PREPAL)	174	0.27	−0.10	0	±0
Progress Party of Castile and León Cities (PPCCAL)	51	0.08	New	0	±0
Blank ballots	1,444	2.26	−1.57		
Total	63,941			27	±0
Valid votes	63,941	98.29	+0.78		
Invalid votes	1,114	1.71	−0.78		
Votes cast / turnout	65,055	62.40	−2.18		
Abstentions	39,194	37.60	+2.18		
Registered voters	104,249				
Sources
Footnotes: ^{1} León in Common results are compared to United Left of Castile and León totals in the 2011 election.

=== Palencia ===
Population: 80,178

← Summary of the 24 May 2015 City Council of Palencia election results →
Parties and alliances	Popular vote			Seats	
Parties and alliances	Votes	%	±pp	Total	+/−
People's Party (PP)	15,843	37.52	−11.79	10	−4
Spanish Socialist Workers' Party (PSOE)	12,875	30.49	−6.57	8	−2
Citizen Candidacy: Let's Win Palencia (Ganemos Palencia)^{1}	7,053	16.70	+9.89	4	+3
Citizens–Party of the Citizenry (C's)	4,388	10.39	New	3	+3
Union, Progress and Democracy (UPyD)	678	1.61	−0.73	0	±0
Castilian Party–Commoners' Land: Pact (PCAS–TC–Pacto)	457	1.08	−0.83	0	±0
Spanish Phalanx of the CNSO (FE de las JONS)	175	0.41	New	0	±0
Blank ballots	760	1.80	−0.77		
Total	42,229			25	±0
Valid votes	42,229	98.24	−0.13		
Invalid votes	755	1.76	+0.13		
Votes cast / turnout	42,984	66.18	−0.43		
Abstentions	21,962	33.82	+0.43		
Registered voters	64,946				
Sources
Footnotes: ^{1} Citizen Candidacy: Let's Win Palencia results are compared to United Left of Castile and León totals in the 2011 election.

=== Ponferrada ===
Population: 67,367

← Summary of the 24 May 2015 City Council of Ponferrada election results →
Parties and alliances	Popular vote			Seats	
Parties and alliances	Votes	%	±pp	Total	+/−
People's Party (PP)	7,533	23.28	−15.68	7	−5
Spanish Socialist Workers' Party (PSOE)	6,766	20.91	−3.49	6	−2
Social Unity of Bierzo Electors (USE Bierzo)	6,013	18.58	New	5	+5
Citizens–Party of the Citizenry (C's)	2,998	9.27	New	2	+2
Coalition for El Bierzo (CB)^{1}	2,896	8.95	+4.71	2	+2
Ponferrada in Common (En Común)^{2}	2,552	7.89	+2.98	2	+2
Regionalist Party of El Bierzo (PRB)	1,688	5.22	+2.60	1	+1
Neighbours Ponferrada (Vecinos Ponferrada)	551	1.70	New	0	±0
Union, Progress and Democracy (UPyD)	398	1.23	+0.25	0	±0
Vox (Vox)	275	0.85	New	0	±0
Grouped Independents of Ponferrada (IAP)	n/a	n/a	−16.53	0	−5
Blank ballots	685	2.12	−0.02		
Total	32,355			25	±0
Valid votes	32,355	97.83	−0.56		
Invalid votes	719	2.17	+0.56		
Votes cast / turnout	33,074	60.52	−3.82		
Abstentions	21,577	39.48	+3.82		
Registered voters	54,651				
Sources
Footnotes: ^{1} Coalition for El Bierzo results are compared to Party of El Bierzo totals in the 2011 election.; ^{2} Ponferrada in Common results are compared to United Left of Castile and León totals in the 2011 election.

=== Salamanca ===
Population: 148,042

← Summary of the 24 May 2015 City Council of Salamanca election results →
Parties and alliances	Popular vote			Seats	
Parties and alliances	Votes	%	±pp	Total	+/−
People's Party (PP)	28,673	39.18	−13.75	12	−6
Spanish Socialist Workers' Party (PSOE)	17,481	23.89	−5.00	7	−2
Citizens–Party of the Citizenry (C's)^{1}	10,051	13.73	+11.24	4	+4
Let's Win Salamanca (Ganemos Salamanca)^{2}	9,990	13.65	+10.36	4	+4
Neighbours for Salamanca (VxSAL)	3,031	4.14	New	0	±0
Union, Progress and Democracy (UPyD)	1,448	1.98	−2.28	0	±0
Vox (Vox)	730	1.00	New	0	±0
Regionalist Party of the Leonese Country (PREPAL)	242	0.33	+0.09	0	±0
Blank ballots	1,542	2.11	−0.77		
Total	73,188			27	±0
Valid votes	73,188	98.40	−0.06		
Invalid votes	1,193	1.60	+0.06		
Votes cast / turnout	74,381	61.83	−0.74		
Abstentions	45,920	38.17	+0.74		
Registered voters	120,301				
Sources
Footnotes: ^{1} Citizens–Party of the Citizenry results are compared to Yes for Salamanca totals in the 2011 election.; ^{2} Let's Win Salamanca results are compared to United Left of Castile and León totals in the 2011 election.

=== Segovia ===
Population: 53,260

← Summary of the 24 May 2015 City Council of Segovia election results →
Parties and alliances	Popular vote			Seats	
Parties and alliances	Votes	%	±pp	Total	+/−
Spanish Socialist Workers' Party (PSOE)	10,502	40.03	−2.23	12	±0
People's Party (PP)	7,672	29.24	−13.39	8	−4
Citizens–Party of the Citizenry (C's)	1,894	7.22	New	2	+2
Union, Progress and Democracy (UPyD)	1,740	6.63	+1.87	2	+2
United Left (IU)	1,380	5.26	−0.27	1	±0
Segovia in Common (En Común)^{1}	820	3.13	+1.73	0	±0
Spanish Democratic Segovian Party (PSeDE)	594	2.26	New	0	±0
Segoviemos (SGV)	534	2.04	New	0	±0
Vox (Vox)	292	1.11	New	0	±0
Independent Segovian Alternative (ASí)	243	0.93	New	0	±0
Castilian Party–Commoners' Land: Pact (PCAS–TC–Pacto)	141	0.54	New	0	±0
Blank ballots	422	1.61	−0.48		
Total	26,234			25	±0
Valid votes	26,234	98.30	−0.26		
Invalid votes	453	1.70	+0.26		
Votes cast / turnout	26,687	66.48	−4.42		
Abstentions	13,456	33.52	+4.42		
Registered voters	40,143				
Sources
Footnotes: ^{1} Segovia in Common results are compared to Left Segovia totals in the 2011 election.

=== Soria ===
Population: 39,516

← Summary of the 24 May 2015 City Council of Soria election results →
Parties and alliances	Popular vote			Seats	
Parties and alliances	Votes	%	±pp	Total	+/−
Spanish Socialist Workers' Party (PSOE)	8,654	46.99	+0.91	11	−1
People's Party (PP)	5,352	29.06	−6.10	7	−2
Citizens–Party of the Citizenry (C's)	1,501	8.15	+5.31	1	+1
Sorian People (Sorian@s)	1,369	7.43	New	1	+1
United Left (IU)	1,161	6.30	+1.38	1	+1
Blank ballots	380	2.06	−1.73		
Total	18,417			21	±0
Valid votes	18,417	98.10	−0.02		
Invalid votes	356	1.90	+0.02		
Votes cast / turnout	18,773	63.03	−0.37		
Abstentions	11,013	36.97	+0.37		
Registered voters	29,786				

=== Valladolid ===
Population: 306,830

← Summary of the 24 May 2015 City Council of Valladolid election results →
Parties and alliances	Popular vote			Seats	
Parties and alliances	Votes	%	±pp	Total	+/−
People's Party (PP)	59,519	35.73	−14.68	12	−5
Spanish Socialist Workers' Party (PSOE)	38,789	23.28	−3.72	8	−1
Valladolid Takes the Floor (Toma la Palabra)^{1}	22,329	13.40	+2.89	4	+1
Yes We Can Valladolid (SÍVA)	16,598	9.96	New	3	+3
Citizens–Party of the Citizenry (C's)	12,706	7.63	New	2	+2
Independent Candidacy–Citizens of Democratic Centre (CI–CCD)^{2}	6,772	4.06	+1.40	0	±0
Union, Progress and Democracy (UPyD)	2,726	1.64	−2.49	0	±0
Vox (Vox)	1,790	1.07	New	0	±0
Communist Party of the Peoples of Spain (PCPE)	709	0.43	+0.23	0	±0
United Free Citizens (CILUS)	516	0.31	New	0	±0
Castilian Party–Commoners' Land: Pact (PCAS–TC–Pacto)	373	0.22	−0.22	0	±0
Internationalist Solidarity and Self-Management (SAIn)	335	0.20	−0.03	0	±0
Spanish Phalanx of the CNSO (FE de las JONS)	282	0.17	−0.09	0	±0
Regionalist Democracy of Castile and León (DRCyL)^{3}	259	0.16	+0.02	0	±0
National Democracy (DN)	220	0.13	New	0	±0
Blank ballots	2,670	1.60	−1.05		
Total	166,593			29	±0
Valid votes	166,593	98.83	+0.25		
Invalid votes	1,966	1.17	−0.25		
Votes cast / turnout	168,559	67.80	+0.10		
Abstentions	80,051	32.20	−0.10		
Registered voters	248,610				
Sources
Footnotes: ^{1} Valladolid Takes the Floor results are compared to United Left of Castile and León totals in the 2011 election.; ^{2} Independent Candidacy–Citizens of Democratic Centre results are compared to The Party of Castile and León–Independent Candidacy totals in the 2011 election.; ^{3} Regionalist Democracy of Castile and León results are compared to Regionalist Unity of Castile and León totals in the 2011 election.

=== Zamora ===
Population: 64,423

← Summary of the 24 May 2015 City Council of Zamora election results →
Parties and alliances	Popular vote			Seats	
Parties and alliances	Votes	%	±pp	Total	+/−
People's Party (PP)	10,420	32.38	−14.55	10	−4
United Left of Castile and León (IUCyL)	9,365	29.10	+12.96	8	+4
Spanish Socialist Workers' Party (PSOE)	5,460	16.97	−6.24	5	−1
Citizens–Party of the Citizenry (C's)	2,769	8.60	New	2	+2
Zamoran Independent Electors (ADEIZA)	1,226	3.81	−2.28	0	−1
Win Zamora. The Citizen Alternative (GZ)	1,183	3.68	New	0	±0
Decide Now (Ahora Decide)	591	1.84	New	0	±0
Union, Progress and Democracy (UPyD)	347	1.08	−1.70	0	±0
Leonese People's Union (UPL)	132	0.41	−0.12	0	±0
Regionalist Party of the Leonese Country (PREPAL)	127	0.39	−0.08	0	±0
Blank ballots	559	1.74	−1.05		
Total	32,179			25	±0
Valid votes	32,179	98.41	−0.07		
Invalid votes	520	1.59	+0.07		
Votes cast / turnout	32,699	61.85	+0.01		
Abstentions	20,169	38.15	−0.01		
Registered voters	52,868				

== See also ==
- 2015 Castilian-Leonese regional election
