= Ahora Decide =

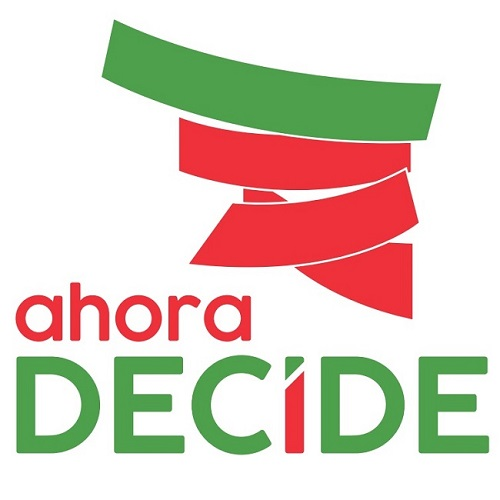
- President: José Luis Ferrero
- General Secretary: Begoña Sánchez Giraldo
- Spokesperson: José Martín Pérez
- Founder: José Luis Ferrero
- Founded: 27 March 2015
- Headquarters: Zamora
- Ideology: Localism
- Municipal councillors in the Province of Zamora: 46 / 1,480

Website
- https://ahoradecide.com/

Ahora Decide (literally, "Decide Now") is a Spanish political party based in the Province of Zamora, Castile and León.

Founded in 2015, the party won the third-most councillors in local elections in the province in 2019 and fourth-most in 2023. Its support is based in rural areas, and it has not won seats in the main cities of Zamora and Benavente, nor on the Provincial Deputation or in the Cortes of Castile and León.

== History ==
The party was officially launched on 27 March 2015. Its founding leader was José Luis Ferrero, a former member of the Provincial Deputation of Zamora and mayor of Micereces de Tera for the Spanish Socialist Workers' Party (PSOE). This came at a time of crisis and defections in the PSOE in the Province of Zamora. In February, the party had been unofficially presented under the name of Decide, an acronym for Decisión Ciudadana Democrática (Citizens' Democratic Decision). Ferrero presented the party as one aiming to uphold human rights and the Constitution of Spain, and said that it would also enlist candidates in the provinces of Segovia and Ávila.

The party took part in the 2015 Spanish local elections in May, where it gained 65 councillors and 13 mayors. In the 2019 elections, this increased to 99 councillors and 18 mayors, as well as a doubling of votes, thereby making itself the third-biggest party in the province. Most of this was concentrated in rural areas, with the party not gaining any seats on councils in Zamora or Benavente, nor entering the Provincial Deputation.

In June 2018, the party merged with ADEIZA (Agrupación de Electores Independientes Zamoranos, Grouping of Independent Voters of Zamora), bringing it up then to 20 mayors and 120 councillors.

Founder Ferrero resigned as spokesman in 2020, and an Extraordinary Congress was held in March 2020 for a new executive. He became honorary president, while José Martín Pérez became the new spokesman and Begoña Sánchez Giraldo the secretary general.

The party has also taken part in elections to the Cortes of Castile and León, but has never gained a seat. In the 2022 election, it took part within Zamora Decide alongside the newly independent ADEIZA and the Union for the Zamoran People (UPZ). The party campaigned for the repair of motorways in the province. José Martín said that the party shared many of the same views of the new Empty Spain movement, but there was no alliance between the two.

In the 2023 Spanish local elections, the party dropped to 46 councillors. This put it fourth behind the PP, PSOE and new localist party Zamora Sí.

Ahora Decide shared a list with Empty Spain in the 2026 Castilian-Leonese regional election, due to a shared commitment against depopulation. The list came sixth in Zamora, with 1.13% of the vote and no seats.
