= Micereces de Tera =

Coordinates: 41°59′N 5°52′W

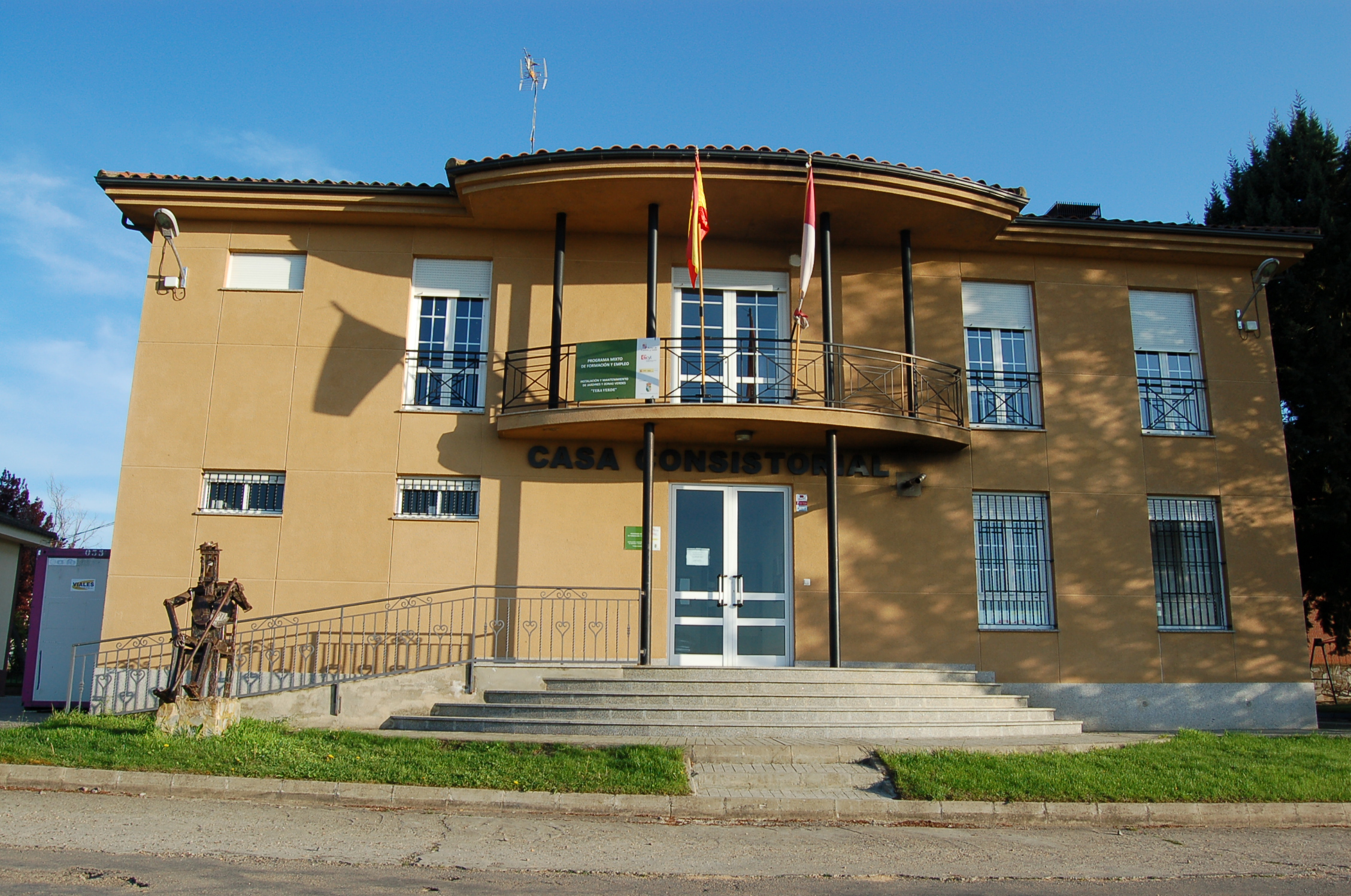

- Coat of arms
- Interactive map of Micereces de Tera
- Country: Spain
- Autonomous community: Castile and León
- Province: Zamora
- Municipality: Micereces de Tera

Area
  - Total: 33 km^{2} (13 sq mi)

Population (2025-01-01)
  - Total: 404
  - Density: 12/km^{2} (32/sq mi)
- Time zone: UTC+1 (CET)
  - Summer (DST): UTC+2 (CEST)

Micereces de Tera is a municipality located in the province of Zamora, Castile and León, Spain. According to the 2004 census (INE), the municipality has a population of 595 inhabitants.
