= Coalition for El Bierzo =

Political coalition in Spain

Coalition for El Bierzo Coalición por El Bierzo
- Leader: Iván Alonso Rodríguez
- President: José Álvarez García
- Secretary-General: Iván Alonso Rodríguez
- Spokesperson: Iván Alonso
- Founded: 2015
- Ideology: Bercian regionalism
- Comarcal council of El Bierzo: 2 / 27
- Provincial deputation of León: 1 / 25
- Local government (Province of León): 39 / 1,661

Website
- Official website

Coalition for El Bierzo (CB, Coalición por El Bierzo) is a Bercian regionalist coalition founded in 2015, by the Party of El Bierzo and the Party of the Land 7, along with various independents.

The coalition won 39 local seats and two mayors (Balboa and Torre del Bierzo) in the 2015 local elections. The coalition also won 62 representatives, including 21 village mayors, in the "pedanías" (local entities smaller than the municipalities).
