= Initiative for the Development of Soria =

Initiative for the Development of Soria Iniciativa por el Desarrollo de Soria
- President: Jaime Martínez Arribas
- Founded: 2002
- Dissolved: 2015
- Merged into: Citizens
- Ideology: Sorian regionalism
- Political position: Centre

Website
- Official website

Initiative for the Development of Soria (IDES, Spanish: Iniciativa por el Desarrollo de Soria) was a Sorian regionalist political party founded in 2002, mainly by ex-members of the provincial branch of the Spanish Socialist Workers' Party (PSOE). The party merged with Citizens (C's) in 2015.

== Election results ==
=== Local councils ===
Local councils
Election	Province of Soria		
Election	Votes	%	Seats won
2011	2,684	5.3	26 / 821
2007	3,753	7.2	20 / 686
2003	4,040	7.5	21 / 684
