= Sorian People's Platform =

Political party in Spain

Sorian People's Platform Plataforma del Pueblo Soriano
- President: José Antonio De Miguel Nieto
- Founded: 2011; 2019 (refoundation)
- Dissolved: 2015
- Merged into: Citizens
- Headquarters: Almazán
- Ideology: Sorian regionalism
- Political position: Centre

Website
- Official website

Sorian People's Platform (PPSO, Spanish: Plataforma del Pueblo Soriano) is a Sorian regionalist political party founded in 2011 by ex-members of the provincial branch of the People's Party (PP). The party merged with Citizens (C's) in 2015, but stood as a separate party in the 2019 Spanish general election coming sixth in Soria with 2656 votes (5%).

== Election results ==
=== Local councils ===
Municipal elections
Election	Province of Soria				
Election	Votes	%	Seats won (local councils)	Seats won (Provincial deputation of Soria)	Mayors elected
2011	2,144	4.2	20 / 821	1 / 25	2 / 183
