= Castilian Party–Commoners' Land =

Castilian Party–Commoners' Land Partido Castellano–Tierra Comunera
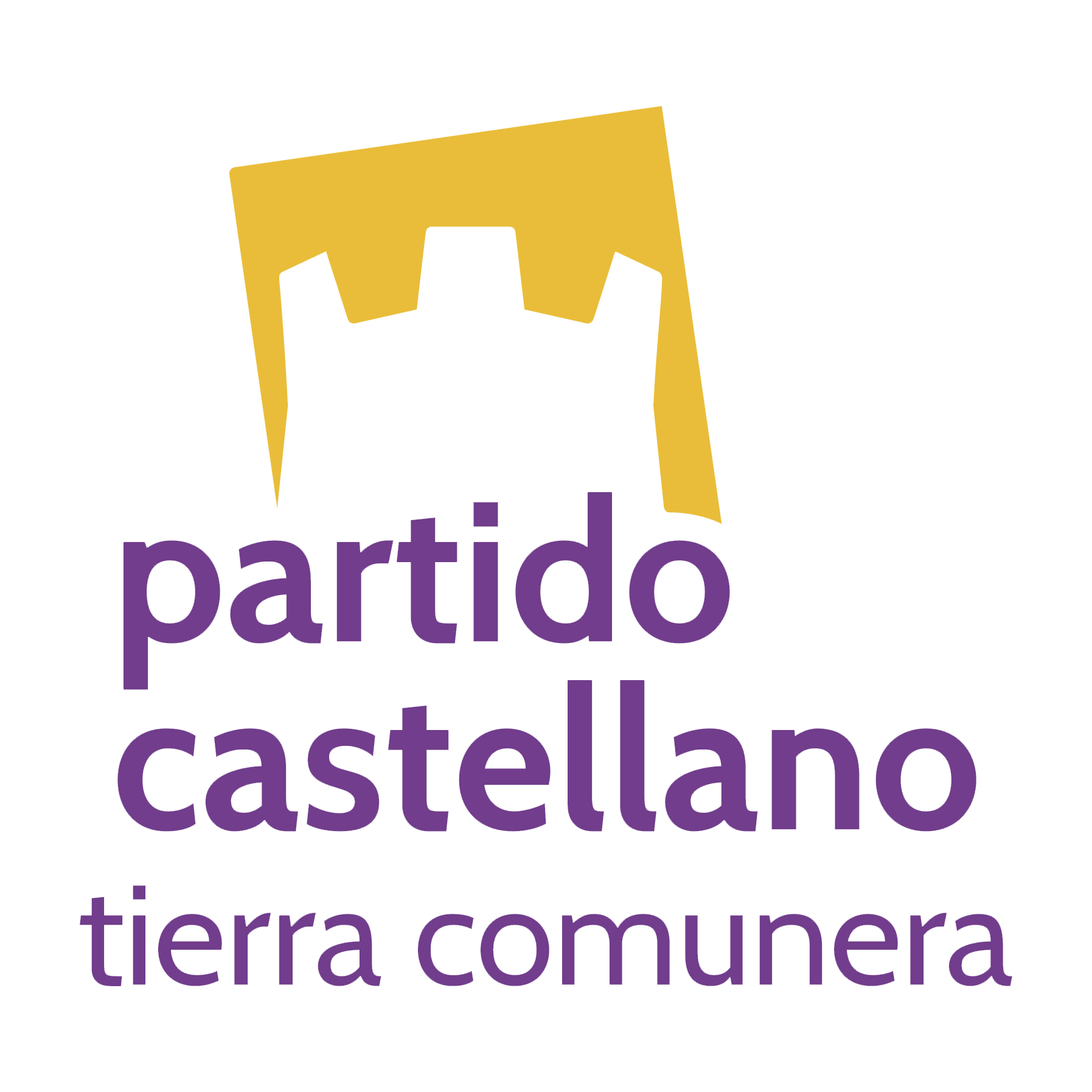
- President: Pedro Manuel Soriano
- Secretary-General: Javier Benedit
- Founded: 24 October 2009
- Merger of: Tierra Comunera; Progress Party of the Cities of Castile and León; Citizen Group
- Headquarters: C/ Valdemoro, 1 bajo, 09001, Burgos, Castilla y León
- Youth wing: Castilla Joven
- Ideology: Castilian nationalism Social democracy Federalism; Progressivism; Ecologism
- Political position: Centre-left
- National affiliation: Sumar (since 2024)
- Colours: Dark purple
- Cortes of Castile and León: 0 / 83
- Local Government (Note: Local seats in the autonomous communities of Castilla-La Mancha, Castilla y León and the Community of Madrid.): 79 / 21,601

Party flag

Website
- www.partidocastellano.org/

The Castilian Party–Commoners' Land (Spanish: Partido Castellano–Tierra Comunera, PCAS–TC), formerly the Party of Castile and León until 2011, is a Spanish political party resulting from the union of several Castilian nationalist and regionalist political parties from Castile and León, Madrid and Castile-La Mancha. The most relevant of the components is Tierra Comunera.

== Ideology ==
The Castilian Party–Commoners' Land wishes to be an alternative to the classic two-party system in Castile. They also state their support for Castilian historical heritage and the environment. From their foundational congress on 24 October 2009, in Toledo onwards, their ideology has been federalist and Castilian nationalist. For this reason, they intend to recover the dissolved sense of Castilian identity and to turn Castile into Spain's financial and political engine by overcoming Castilian endemic problems like depopulation, population aging, youth emigration, and despotism. All of said problems have been publicly denounced by the party. The party seeks to recover the political union of Castile as a single territory, which is currently split into five regions: Castile and León, Castile-La Mancha, Madrid, Cantabria and La Rioja.

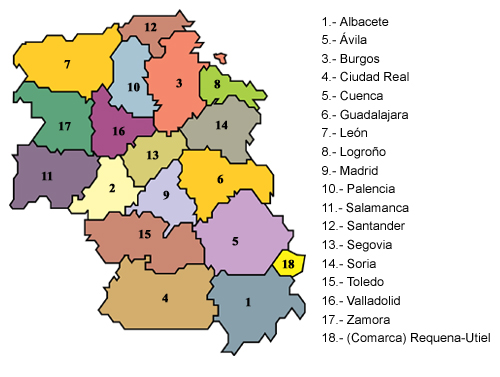
Territory claimed by the Castilian Party.

== History ==
In July 2010, the party announced its intention to participate in the Catalan regional parliament election with the name of Castilian Party–Party of the Cultures of Catalonia.

During the Spanish general election 2011, the party formed an association with the Cantabrian Regionalist Party and contested the election.

== Party split ==
Since the party's creation, there were two very different political currents: one more official (which supported the union of the whole of Castile), and another much stronger in support to simpler regionalist ideas (which supported the political reality in force). During the party congress in October 2011, a majority of party members unanimously approved a new political strategy and changed the former name "Party of Castile and León" to simply the "Castilian Party". This initiative was promoted and supported by the party directorate and caused the regionalist current to quit the party. The splinter group decided to found a new party called the Regionalist Party of Castile and León (PRCAL).

== Results ==
=== General elections ===
Date	Votes			Seats		Status	Size
Date	#	%	±pp	#	±	Status	Size
2011	2,431	0.01	–	0 / 350	–	N/A	34th

=== Cortes of Castile and León ===
Date	Votes			Seats		Status	Size
Date	#	%	±pp	#	±	Status	Size
2011	13,537	0.94%	–	0 / 84	–	N/A	6th
2015	4,504	0.33%	–0.61	0 / 84	0	N/A	12th

=== Cortes of Castilla–La Mancha ===
Date	Votes			Seats		Status	Size
Date	#	%	±pp	#	±	Status	Size
2011	2,752	0.23%	–	0 / 49	–	N/A	6th
2015	With PCAS–UdCa	0.14%	–0.09	0 / 33	0	N/A	11th

=== Assembly of Madrid ===
Date	Votes			Seats		Status	Size
Date	#	%	±pp	#	±	Status	Size
2011	1,722	0.06%	–	0 / 129	–	N/A	16th
2015	With PCAS–TC	0.06%	+0.00	0 / 129	0	N/A	18th

=== Local elections ===
Date	Votes			Seats		Size
Date	#	%	±pp	#	±	Size
2011	With PCAS–CI	0.14%	–	195 / 68,230	–	32nd
2015	With PCAS–TC	0.04%	–0.10	75 / 67,515	120	63rd
