= Fifth government of Juan Vicente Herrera =

Fifth Herrera government
- Government of Castile and León

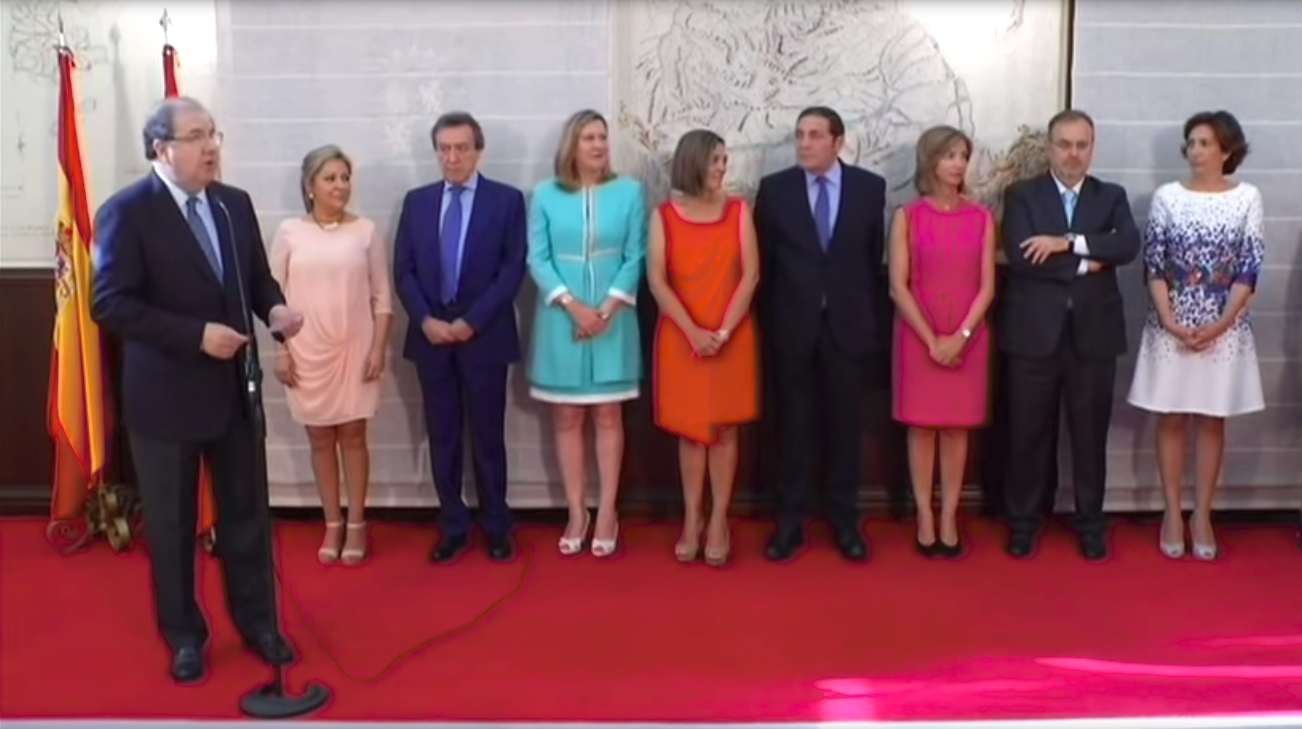
- The government in July 2015
- Date formed: 8 July 2015
- Date dissolved: 16 July 2019

People and organisations
- Head of state: Felipe VI
- Head of government: Juan Vicente Herrera
- Deputy head of government: Rosa Valdeón (2015–16); J. A. de Santiago-Juárez (2016–19); Josefa García (2019)
- No. of ministers: 10 (2015–19); 8 (2019); 6 (2019)
- Ministers removed: 5
- Total no. of members: 11
- Member party: People's Party
- Status in legislature: Minority government 42 / 84 (50%)
- Opposition party: Socialist Party
- Opposition leader: Luis Tudanca

History
- Election: 24 May 2015
- Outgoing election: 26 May 2019
- Legislature term: 9th Cortes (2015–19)
- Predecessor: Herrera IV
- Successor: Fernández

The fifth Herrera government was a regional government of Castile and León led by President Juan Vicente Herrera. It was formed in July 2015 after the regional election and ended in July 2019 following the regional election.

== Government ==
Name	Portrait	Party	Office	Took office	Left office	^{Refs.}
Juan Vicente Herrera		People's Party of Castile and León	President	3 July 2015	11 July 2019	
Rosa Valdeón		People's Party of Castile and León	Vice President	8 July 2015	11 September 2016	
Rosa Valdeón		People's Party of Castile and León	Minister of Employment	8 July 2015	11 September 2016	
Rosa Valdeón		People's Party of Castile and León	Government Spokesperson	8 July 2015	11 September 2016	
J. A. de Santiago-Juárez		People's Party of Castile and León	Vice President	13 September 2016	13 June 2019	
J. A. de Santiago-Juárez		People's Party of Castile and León	Minister of the Presidency	8 July 2015	13 June 2019	
J. A. de Santiago-Juárez		People's Party of Castile and León	Government Spokesperson	21 March 2019	13 June 2019	
Josefa García		People's Party of Castile and León	Vice President (acting)	13 June 2019	16 July 2019	
Josefa García		People's Party of Castile and León	Minister of Culture and Tourism	8 July 2015	16 July 2019	
Josefa García		People's Party of Castile and León	Minister of the Presidency (acting)	13 June 2019	16 July 2019	
Pilar del Olmo		People's Party of Castile and León	Minister of Economy and Finance	8 July 2015	13 June 2019	
Carlos Fernández		People's Party of Castile and León	Minister of Employment	13 September 2016	16 July 2019	
Carlos Fernández		People's Party of Castile and León	Minister of Family and Equal Opportunities (acting)	21 March 2019	16 July 2019	
Carlos Fernández		People's Party of Castile and León	Minister of Economy and Finance (acting)	13 June 2019	16 July 2019	
Alicia García		People's Party of Castile and León	Minister of Family and Equal Opportunities	8 July 2015	21 March 2019	
Milagros Marcos		People's Party of Castile and León	Minister of Agriculture and Livestock	8 July 2015	21 March 2019	
Milagros Marcos		People's Party of Castile and León	Government Spokesperson	13 September 2016	21 March 2019	
Fernando Rey		Independent	Minister of Education	8 July 2015	16 July 2019	
Antonio María Sáez		People's Party of Castile and León	Minister of Health	8 July 2015	16 July 2019	
J. C. Suárez-Quiñones		People's Party of Castile and León	Minister of Development and the Environment	13 July 2015	16 July 2019	
J. C. Suárez-Quiñones		People's Party of Castile and León	Minister of Agriculture and Livestock (acting)	21 March 2019	16 July 2019	
