= Second government of Alfonso Fernández Mañueco =

2nd government of Alfonso Fernández Mañueco
- Government of Castile and León
- 2022–2026
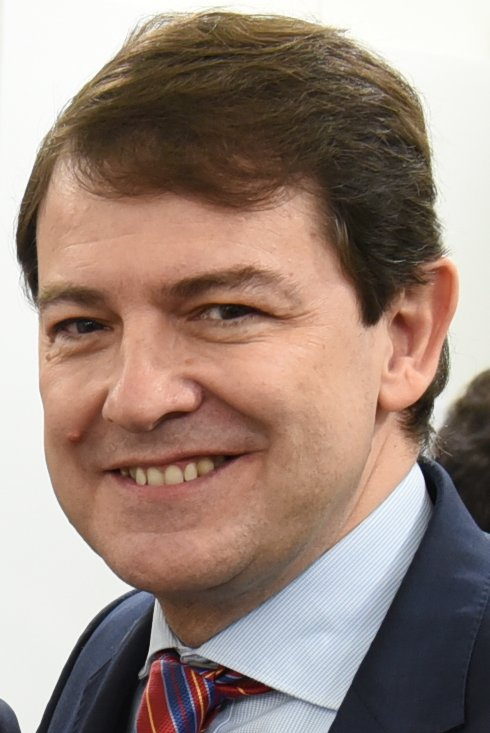
- Alfonso Fernández Mañueco in January 2020.
- Date formed: 20 April 2022
- Date dissolved: 15 June 2026

People and organisations
- Monarch: Felipe VI
- President: Alfonso Fernández Mañueco
- Vice President: Juan García-Gallardo (2022–2024); Isabel Blanco (2024–2026)
- No. of ministers: 11 (Note: Does not include the President.)
- Total no. of members: 14
- Member party: PP; Vox (2022–2024)
- Status in legislature: Majority (coalition) (2022–2024); Minority (single-party) (2024–2026)
- Opposition party: PSOE
- Opposition leader: Luis Tudanca (2022–2025); Carlos Martínez (2025–2026)

History
- Election: 2022 regional election
- Outgoing election: 2026 regional election
- Legislature term: 11th Cortes
- Predecessor: Mañueco I
- Successor: Mañueco III

The second government of Alfonso Fernández Mañueco was formed on 20 April 2022, following the latter's election as President of the Regional Government of Castile and León by the Cortes of Castile and León on 11 April and his scheduled swearing-in on 19 April, as a result of the People's Party (PP) and Vox being able to muster a majority of seats in the Cortes following the 2022 Castilian-Leonese regional election. It succeeded the first Mañueco government and was the Regional Government of Castile and León from 20 April 2022 to 15 June 2026, a total of 1,517 days, or 4 years, 1 month and 26 days.

Until 2024, the cabinet comprised members of the PP and Vox, as well as a number of independents proposed by both parties, to become the first PP–Vox coalition government to be formed as well as the first time a far-right party had entered a government either at the regional or national level in Spain since the country's transition to democracy. On 11 July 2024, Vox leader Santiago Abascal forced the break up of all PP–Vox governments at the regional level over a national controversy regarding the distribution of unaccompanied migrant minors among the autonomous communities. It was automatically dismissed on 16 March 2026 as a consequence of the 2026 regional election, but remained in acting capacity until the next government was sworn in.

== Investiture ==
Investiture; Nomination of Alfonso Fernández Mañueco (PP)
| Ballot → | 11 April 2022 |
| Required majority → | 41 out of 81 |
| Yes: • PP (31); • Vox (13) | 44 / 81 |
| No: • PSOE (28); • UPL (3); • SY (3); • Podemos (1); • Cs (1); • XAV (1) | 37 / 81 |
| Abstentions | 0 / 81 |
| Absentees | 0 / 81 |

== Cabinet changes ==
Mañueco's second government saw a number of cabinet changes during its tenure:

- On 11 May 2023, minister of the Presidency Jesús Julio Carnero announced his stepping down from the post in order to run for the office of mayor of Valladolid in the upcoming 28 May local elections. He was replaced by Luis Miguel González Gago, effective on 15 May.
- On 11 July 2024, Vox leader Santiago Abascal announced that his party was breaking all of its regional governments with the People's Party (PP) as a result of the later agreeing to a nationwide distribution of unaccompanied migrant minors among the autonomous communities under its control. In Castile and León, this resulted in the resignation of Vice President Juan García-Gallardo; Minister of Culture and Tourism Gonzalo Santonja announced that he was not leaving the government and quit his Vox membership, whereas the Industry and Agriculture ministers, Mariano Veganzones and Gerardo Dueñas respectively, were removed despite having voiced their will to stay on. They were replaced by Isabel Blanco as vice president, Leticia García as Industry, Trade and Employment minister and María González Corral in the Agriculture, Livestock and Rural Development portfolio, the later being replaced in her original office as minister of Mobility and Digital Transformation by José Luis Sanz Merino.

== Council of Government ==
The Council of Government was structured into the offices for the president, the vice president, ten ministries and the post of the spokesperson of the Government.

← Mañueco II Government → (20 April 2022 – 15 June 2026)
| Portfolio | Name | Party | Took office | Left office | Ref. |
| President | Alfonso Fernández Mañueco | PP | 13 April 2022 | 11 June 2026 | |
| Vice President | Juan García-Gallardo | Vox | 20 April 2022 | 13 July 2024 | |
| Minister of the Presidency | Jesús Julio Carnero | PP | 20 April 2022 | 15 May 2023 | |
| Minister of Economy and Finance; Spokesperson of the Government | Carlos Fernández Carriedo | PP | 20 April 2022 | 15 June 2026 | |
| Minister of Industry, Trade and Employment | Mariano Veganzones | Vox | 20 April 2022 | 13 July 2024 | |
| Minister of Environment, Housing and Territory Planning | Juan Carlos Suárez-Quiñones | PP | 20 April 2022 | 15 June 2026 | |
| Minister of Mobility and Digital Transformation | María González Corral | Independent | 20 April 2022 | 13 July 2024 | |
| Minister of Agriculture, Livestock and Rural Development | Gerardo Dueñas | Vox | 20 April 2022 | 13 July 2024 | |
| Minister of Health | Alejandro Vázquez | PP | 20 April 2022 | 15 June 2026 | |
| Minister of Family Affairs and Equal Opportunities | Isabel Blanco | PP | 20 April 2022 | 13 July 2024 | |
| Minister of Education | Rocío Lucas | PP | 20 April 2022 | 15 June 2026 | |
| Minister of Culture and Tourism | Gonzalo Santonja | Independent (Note: Initially proposed by Vox. Rebelled from the party in July 2024.) | 20 April 2022 | 15 June 2026 | |
=== Changes May 2023 ===
| Portfolio | Name | Party | Took office | Left office | Ref. |
| Minister of the Presidency | Luis Miguel González Gago | PP | 15 May 2023 | 15 June 2026 | |
=== Changes July 2024 ===
| Portfolio | Name | Party | Took office | Left office | Ref. |
| Vice President; Minister of Family Affairs and Equal Opportunities | Isabel Blanco | PP | 13 July 2024 | 15 June 2026 | |
| Minister of Industry, Trade and Employment | Leticia García | PP | 13 July 2024 | 15 June 2026 | |
| Minister of Mobility and Digital Transformation | José Luis Sanz Merino | PP | 13 July 2024 | 15 June 2026 | |
| Minister of Agriculture, Livestock and Rural Development | María González Corral | Independent | 13 July 2024 | 15 June 2026 | |

== Departmental structure ==
Alfonso Fernández Mañueco's first government was organised into several superior and governing units, whose number, powers and hierarchical structure varied depending on the ministerial department.

| Office (Original name) | Portrait | Name | Took office | Left office | Alliance/party | Ref. |
=== Presidency ===
| Presidency (Presidencia de la Junta) | | Alfonso Fernández Mañueco | 13 April 2022 | 11 June 2026 | PP | |
| Vice Presidency (Vicepresidencia de la Junta) | | Juan García-Gallardo | 20 April 2022 | 13 July 2024 | Vox | |
| Vice Presidency (Vicepresidencia de la Junta) | | Isabel Blanco | 13 July 2024 | 15 June 2026 | PP | |
| Vice Presidency (Vicepresidencia de la Junta) | None (20 April 2022 – 13 July 2024); See Ministry of Family Affairs and Equal Opportunities (13 July 2024 – 15 June 2026) | | | | | |
=== Ministry of the Presidency ===
| Ministry of the Presidency (Consejería de la Presidencia) | | Jesús Julio Carnero | 20 April 2022 | 15 May 2023 | PP | |
| Ministry of the Presidency (Consejería de la Presidencia) | | Luis Miguel González Gago | 15 May 2023 | 15 June 2026 | PP | |
=== Ministry of Economy and Finance ===
| Ministry of Economy and Finance (Consejería de Economía y Hacienda) | | Carlos Fernández Carriedo | 20 April 2022 | 15 June 2026 | PP | |
=== Ministry of Industry, Trade and Employment ===
| Ministry of Industry, Trade and Employment (Consejería de Industria, Comercio y Empleo) | | Mariano Veganzones | 20 April 2022 | 13 July 2024 | Vox | |
| Ministry of Industry, Trade and Employment (Consejería de Industria, Comercio y Empleo) | | Leticia García | 15 May 2023 | 13 July 2024 | PP | |
=== Ministry of Environment, Housing and Territory Planning ===
| Ministry of Environment, Housing and Territory Planning (Consejería de Medio Ambiente, Vivienda y Ordenación del Territorio) | | Juan Carlos Suárez-Quiñones | 20 April 2022 | 15 June 2026 | PP | |
=== Ministry of Mobility and Digital Transformation ===
| Ministry of Mobility and Digital Transformation (Consejería de Movilidad y Transformación Digital) | | María González Corral | 20 April 2022 | 13 July 2024 | PP (Independent) | |
| Ministry of Mobility and Digital Transformation (Consejería de Movilidad y Transformación Digital) | | José Luis Sanz Merino | 13 July 2024 | 15 June 2026 | PP | |
=== Ministry of Agriculture, Livestock and Rural Development ===
| Ministry of Agriculture, Livestock and Rural Development (Consejería de Agricultura, Ganadería y Desarrollo Rural) | | Gerardo Dueñas | 20 April 2022 | 13 July 2024 | Vox | |
| Ministry of Agriculture, Livestock and Rural Development (Consejería de Agricultura, Ganadería y Desarrollo Rural) | | María González Corral | 13 July 2024 | 15 June 2026 | PP (Independent) | |
=== Ministry of Health ===
| Ministry of Health (Consejería de Sanidad) | | Alejandro Vázquez | 20 April 2022 | 15 June 2026 | PP | |
=== Ministry of Family Affairs and Equal Opportunities ===
| Ministry of Family Affairs and Equal Opportunities (Consejería de Familia e Igualdad de Oportunidades) | | Isabel Blanco | 20 April 2022 | 15 June 2026 | PP | |
=== Ministry of Education ===
| Ministry of Education (Consejería de Educación) | | Rocío Lucas | 20 April 2022 | 15 June 2026 | PP | |
=== Ministry of Culture and Tourism ===
| Ministry of Culture and Tourism (Consejería de Cultura y Turismo) | | Gonzalo Santonja | 20 April 2022 | 15 June 2026 | PP from Jul 2024; Vox until Jul 2024 (Independent) | |
=== Spokesperson of the Government ===
| Spokesperson of the Government (Portavoz del Gobierno) | | Carlos Fernández Carriedo | 20 April 2022 | 15 June 2026 | PP | |

== Notes ==
| Preceded by Mañueco I | Regional Government of Castile and León; 2022–2026 | Succeeded by Mañueco III |
