= First government of Alfonso Fernández Mañueco =

1st government of Alfonso Fernández Mañueco
- Government of Castile and León
- 2019–2022
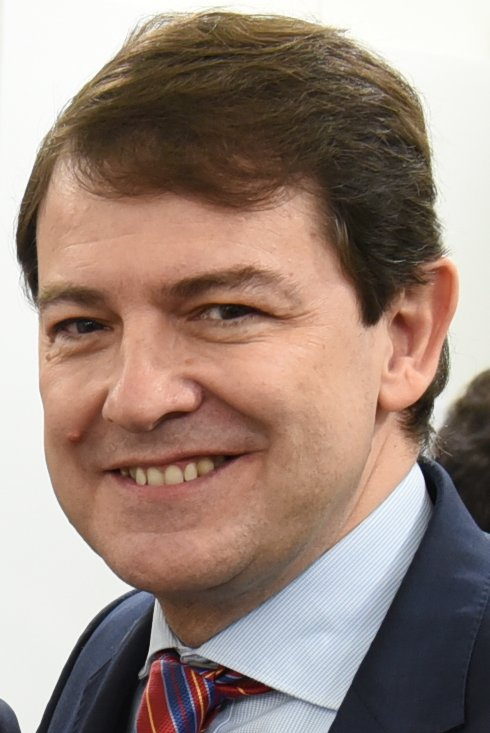
- Alfonso Fernández Mañueco in January 2020.
- Date formed: 17 July 2019
- Date dissolved: 20 April 2022

People and organisations
- Monarch: Felipe VI
- President: Alfonso Fernández Mañueco
- Vice President: Francisco Igea (2019–2021)
- No. of ministers: 11
- Member party: PP; Cs (2019–2021)
- Status in legislature: Majority (coalition) (2019–2021); Minority (coalition) (2021); Minority (single-party) (2021–2022)
- Opposition party: PSOE
- Opposition leader: Luis Tudanca

History
- Election: 2019 regional election
- Outgoing election: 2022 regional election
- Legislature term: 10th Cortes
- Budget: 2020, 2021
- Predecessor: Herrera V
- Successor: Mañueco II

The first government of Alfonso Fernández Mañueco was formed on 17 July 2019, following the latter's election as President of the Regional Government of Castile and León by the Cortes of Castile and León on 9 July and his swearing-in on 12 July, as a result of the People's Party (PP) and Citizens (Cs) being able to muster a majority of seats in the Cortes following the 2019 Castilian-Leonese regional election. It succeeded the fifth Herrera government and was the Regional Government of Castile and León from 17 July 2019 to 20 April 2022, a total of 1,008 days, or 2 years, 9 months and 3 days.

Until 2021, the cabinet comprised members of the PP and Cs, to become the first coalition government to be formed in the region. On 20 December 2021, regional president Mañueco expelled all Cs members from the cabinet under a pretext to call a snap regional election. It was automatically dismissed on 14 February 2022 as a consequence of the 2022 regional election, but remained in acting capacity until the next government was sworn in.

== Investiture ==
Investiture; Nomination of Alfonso Fernández Mañueco (PP)
Ballot →	9 July 2019
Required majority →	41 out of 81
Yes: • PP (29); • Cs (12)	41 / 81
No: • PSOE (35); • Podemos (2); • UPL (1)	38 / 81
Abstentions: • Vox (1); • XAV (1)	2 / 81
Absentees	0 / 81

== Cabinet changes ==
Mañueco's first government saw a number of cabinet changes during its tenure:

- On 25 May 2020, Germán Barrios announced his resignation as Minister of Employment and Industry, citing "insurmountable differences" with regional vice president Francisco Igea. He was succeeded in his post by Ana Carlota Amigo on 28 May, with Carlos Fernández Carriedo (from the PP) serving in acting capacity until she could be sworn into office.
- On 20 December 2021, Mañueco expelled all four Cs members from his cabinet and announced a snap regional election for 13 February citing "stability concerns" and mistrust on his coalition partner, a move to which Cs replied with outrage.

== Council of Government ==
The Council of Government was structured into the offices for the president, the vice president, nine ministries and the post of the spokesperson of the Government.

← Mañueco I Government → (17 July 2019 – 20 April 2022)
Portfolio	Name	Party	Took office	Left office	Ref.
President	Alfonso Fernández Mañueco	PP	12 July 2019	13 April 2022	
Vice President; Minister of Transparency, Territory Planning and Foreign Action; Spokesperson of the Government	Francisco Igea	Cs	17 July 2019	21 December 2021	
Minister of the Presidency	Ángel Ibáñez Hernando	PP	17 July 2019	20 April 2022	
Minister of Economy and Finance	Carlos Fernández Carriedo	PP	17 July 2019	20 April 2022	
Minister of Employment and Industry	Germán Barrios	Cs	17 July 2019	26 May 2020	
Minister of Development and Environment	Juan Carlos Suárez-Quiñones	PP	17 July 2019	20 April 2022	
Minister of Agriculture, Livestock and Rural Development	Jesús Julio Carnero	PP	17 July 2019	20 April 2022	
Minister of Health	Verónica Casado	Cs	17 July 2019	21 December 2021	
Minister of Family Affairs and Equal Opportunities	Isabel Blanco	PP	17 July 2019	20 April 2022	
Minister of Education	Rocío Lucas	PP	17 July 2019	20 April 2022	
Minister of Culture and Tourism	Javier Ortega Álvarez	Cs	17 July 2019	21 December 2021	
=== Changes May 2020 ===
Portfolio	Name	Party	Took office	Left office	Ref.
Minister of Employment and Industry	Carlos Fernández Carriedo served in acting capacity from 26 to 29 May 2020.				
Minister of Employment and Industry	Ana Carlota Amigo	Cs	29 May 2020	21 December 2021	
=== Changes December 2021 ===
Portfolio	Name	Party	Took office	Left office	Ref.
~~Vice President~~	Discontinued on 21 December 2021 upon the officeholder's dismissal.				
Minister of Transparency, Territory Planning and Foreign Action	Ángel Ibáñez Hernando served in acting capacity from 21 December 2021 to 20 April 2022.				
Minister of Employment and Industry	Carlos Fernández Carriedo served in acting capacity from 21 December 2021 to 20 April 2022.				
Minister of Health	Alejandro Vázquez	PP	21 December 2021	20 April 2022	
Minister of Culture and Tourism	Rocío Lucas served in acting capacity from 21 December 2021 to 20 April 2022.				

== Departmental structure ==
Alfonso Fernández Mañueco's first government was organised into several superior and governing units, whose number, powers and hierarchical structure varied depending on the ministerial department.

Office (Original name)	Portrait	Name	Took office	Left office	Alliance/party	Ref.
=== Presidency ===
Presidency (Presidencia de la Junta)		Alfonso Fernández Mañueco	12 July 2019	13 April 2022	PP	
Vice Presidency (Vicepresidencia de la Junta)		Francisco Igea	17 July 2019	21 December 2021	Cs	
Vice Presidency (Vicepresidencia de la Junta)	See Ministry of Transparency, Territory Planning and Foreign Action					
=== Ministry of the Presidency ===
Ministry of the Presidency (Consejería de la Presidencia)		Ángel Ibáñez Hernando	17 July 2019	20 April 2022	PP	
=== Ministry of Transparency, Territory Planning and Foreign Action ===
Ministry of Transparency, Territory; Planning and Foreign Action (Consejería de Transparencia, Ordenación del Territorio y Acción Exterior)		Francisco Igea	17 July 2019	21 December 2021	Cs	
Ministry of Transparency, Territory; Planning and Foreign Action (Consejería de Transparencia, Ordenación del Territorio y Acción Exterior)		Ángel Ibáñez Hernando (acting)	21 December 2021	20 April 2022	PP	
=== Ministry of Economy and Finance ===
Ministry of Economy and Finance (Consejería de Economía y Hacienda)		Carlos Fernández Carriedo	17 July 2019	20 April 2022	PP	
=== Ministry of Employment and Industry ===
Ministry of Employment and Industry (Consejería de Empleo e Industria)		Germán Barrios	17 July 2019	26 May 2020 (resigned)	Cs	
Ministry of Employment and Industry (Consejería de Empleo e Industria)		Carlos Fernández Carriedo (acting)	26 May 2020	29 May 2020	PP	
Ministry of Employment and Industry (Consejería de Empleo e Industria)		Ana Carlota Amigo	29 May 2020	21 December 2021	Cs	
Ministry of Employment and Industry (Consejería de Empleo e Industria)		Carlos Fernández Carriedo (acting)	21 December 2021	20 April 2022	PP	
=== Ministry of Development and Environment ===
Ministry of Development and Environment (Consejería de Fomento y Medio Ambiente)		Juan Carlos Suárez-Quiñones	17 July 2019	20 April 2022	PP	
=== Ministry of Agriculture, Livestock and Rural Development ===
Ministry of Agriculture, Livestock and Rural Development (Consejería de Agricultura, Ganadería y Desarrollo Rural)		Jesús Julio Carnero	17 July 2019	20 April 2022	PP	
=== Ministry of Health ===
Ministry of Health (Consejería de Sanidad)		Verónica Casado	17 July 2019	21 December 2021	Cs	
Ministry of Health (Consejería de Sanidad)		Alejandro Vázquez	21 December 2021	20 April 2022	PP	
=== Ministry of Family Affairs and Equal Opportunities ===
Ministry of Family Affairs and Equal Opportunities (Consejería de Familia e Igualdad de Oportunidades)		Isabel Blanco	17 July 2019	20 April 2022	PP	
=== Ministry of Education ===
Ministry of Education (Consejería de Educación)		Rocío Lucas	17 July 2019	20 April 2022	PP	
=== Ministry of Culture and Tourism ===
Ministry of Culture and Tourism (Consejería de Cultura y Turismo)		Javier Ortega Álvarez	17 July 2019	21 December 2021	Cs	
Ministry of Culture and Tourism (Consejería de Cultura y Turismo)		Rocío Lucas (acting)	21 December 2021	20 April 2022	PP	
=== Spokesperson of the Government ===
Spokesperson of the Government (Portavoz del Gobierno)		Francisco Igea	17 July 2019	21 December 2021	Cs	

Preceded by Herrera V	Regional Government of Castile and León; 2019–2022	Succeeded by Mañueco II
