= Third government of Alfonso Fernández Mañueco =

3rd government of Alfonso Fernández Mañueco
- Government of Castile and León
- 2026–present
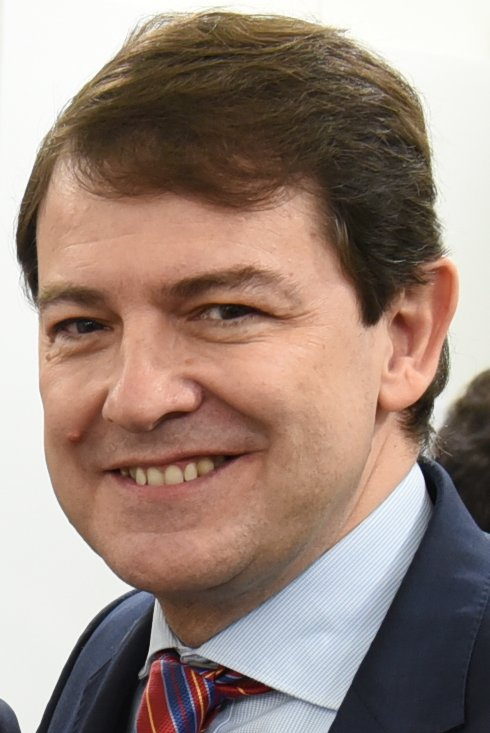
- Alfonso Fernández Mañueco in January 2020.
- Date formed: 15 June 2026

People and organisations
- Monarch: Felipe VI
- President: Alfonso Fernández Mañueco
- Vice Presidents: Carlos Pollán^{1st}, Isabel Blanco^{2nd}
- No. of ministers: 11 (Note: Does not include the President.)
- Member party: PP; Vox
- Status in legislature: Majority (coalition)
- Opposition party: PSOE
- Opposition leader: Carlos Martínez

History
- Election: 2026 regional election
- Legislature term: 12th Cortes
- Predecessor: Mañueco II

The second government of Alfonso Fernández Mañueco was formed on 15 June 2026, following the latter's election as President of the Regional Government of Castile and León by the Cortes of Castile and León on 9 June and his scheduled swearing-in on 11 June, as a result of the People's Party (PP) and Vox being able to muster a majority of seats in the Cortes following the 2026 Castilian-Leonese regional election. It succeeded the second Mañueco government and has been the incumbent Regional Government of Castile and León since 15 June 2026, a total of 28 days.

The cabinet comprises members of the PP and Vox, as well as a number of independents proposed by the first party.

== Investiture ==
Investiture; Nomination of Alfonso Fernández Mañueco (PP)
Ballot →	9 June 2026
Required majority →	42 out of 82
Yes: • PP (33); • Vox (14)	47 / 82
No: • PSOE (30); • UPL (3); • XAV (1); • SY (1)	35 / 82
Abstentions	0 / 82
Absentees	0 / 82

== Council of Government ==
The Council of Government is structured into the offices for the president, the vice president, ten ministries and the post of the spokesperson of the Government.

← Mañueco III Government → (15 June 2026 – present)
Portfolio	Name	Party	Took office	Left office	Ref.
President	Alfonso Fernández Mañueco	PP	11 June 2026	Incumbent	
First Vice President; Minister of Deregulation, Family Affairs and Social Assistance	Carlos Pollán	Vox	15 June 2026	Incumbent	
Second Vice President	Isabel Blanco	PP	15 June 2026	Incumbent	
Minister of the Presidency	Luis Miguel González Gago	PP	15 June 2026	Incumbent	
Minister of Economy and Finance; Spokesperson of the Government	Carlos Fernández Carriedo	PP	15 June 2026	Incumbent	
Minister of Industry, Universities, Employment and Trade	Juan Carlos Suárez-Quiñones	PP	15 June 2026	Incumbent	
Minister of Environment and Energy	María González Corral	Independent	15 June 2026	Incumbent	
Minister of Mobility, Digital Transformation and Artificial Intelligence	Cristina Sanchidrián	Independent	15 June 2026	Incumbent	
Minister of Agriculture, Livestock, Rural Environment and Environmental Policy	Joaquín Antonio Pino	Vox	15 June 2026	Incumbent	
Minister of Health and Social Welfare	Alejandro Vázquez	PP	15 June 2026	Incumbent	
Minister of Education	María Pardo Álvarez	PP	15 June 2026	Incumbent	
Minister of Culture, Tourism and Sport	Alberto Díaz Pico	Vox	15 June 2026	Incumbent	

== Notes ==
Preceded by Mañueco II	Regional Government of Castile and León; 2026–present	Incumbent
