= Government of Alfonso Fernández Mañueco =

Government of Alfonso Fernández Mañueco may refer to:

- First government of Alfonso Fernández Mañueco (2019–2022)
- Second government of Alfonso Fernández Mañueco (2022–2026)
- Third government of Alfonso Fernández Mañueco (2026–present)
