= Alicia García Rodríguez =

Spanish politician (born 1970)

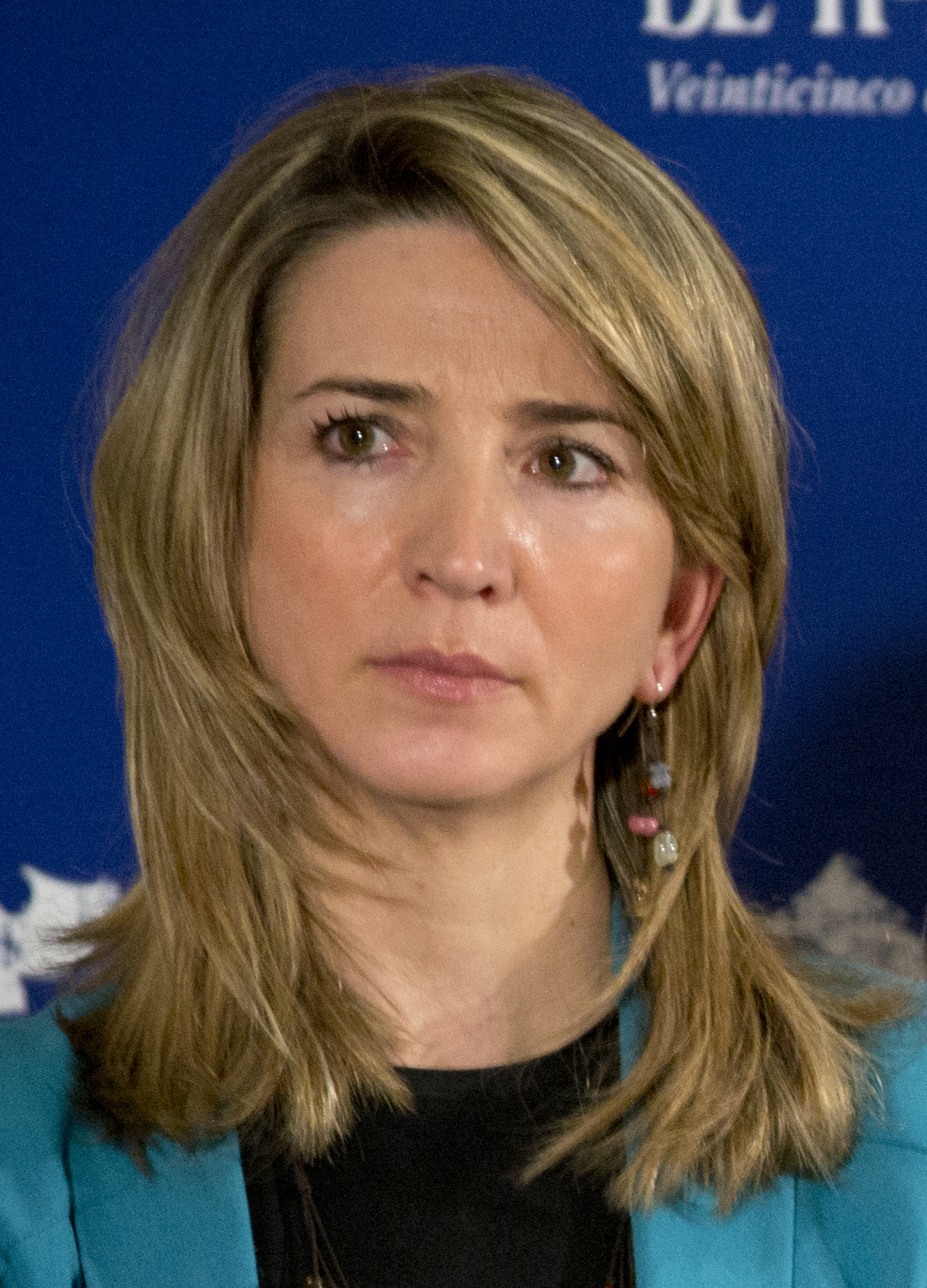
- Alicia García Rodríguez

Deputy in the Cortes Generales by Ávila
- In office 21 May 2019 – 2023

Councilor for Family and Equal Opportunities of the Junta of Castile and León
- In office 8 July 2015 – 22 March 2019
- Preceded by: Milagros Marcos
- Succeeded by: Isabel Blanco Llamas

Minister of Culture and Tourism of the Junta of Castile and León
- In office 27 June 2011 – 8 July 2015

Personal details
- Born: 3 January 1970 (age 56) Ávila, Spain
- Party: People's Party
- Education: Complutense University of Madrid
- Occupation: Politician

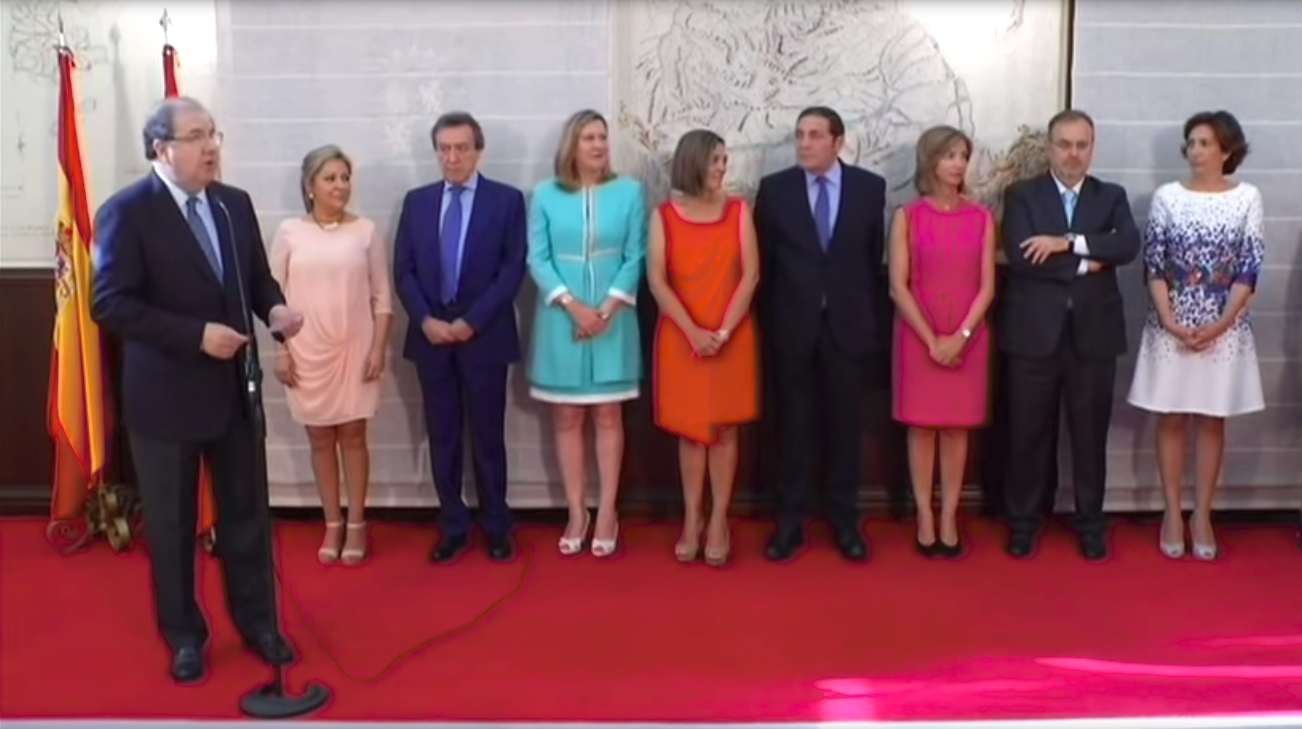

Alicia García Rodríguez (born 3 January 1970) is a Spanish politician. She is a member of the People's Party. She is a current deputy in the cortes generales of the Ávila since 21 May 2019. The national electoral commission of the People's Party made public the announcement that García would attend as head of the list for Ávila ahead of the 201 general elections on March 15, 2019. She was minister of culture and tourism of the Junta of Castile and León from 27 June 2011 to 8 July 2015. She was also councilor for family and equal opportunities of the Junta of Castile and León from 27 June 2011 to 8 July 2015.

== Biography ==
Alicia García was born in Ávila, Spain on 3 January 1970. She is married. She studied at the Complutense University of Madrid and received a bachelor of economic and business sciences from the Complutense University of Madrid. She was elected deputy of the XIII and XIV legislatures. She was elected to the 15th Senate of Spain in the 2023 Spanish general election from Ávila.

Political offices
Preceded by -	Deputy in the Cortes Generales by Ávila; 21 May 2019	Succeeded by -
Preceded by -	Minister of Culture and Tourism of the Junta of Castile and León; 27 June 2011 – 8 July 2015	Succeeded by -
Preceded by -	Councilor for Family and Equal Opportunities of the Junta of Castile and León; 8 July 2015 – 22 March 2019	Succeeded by -
