= Noelia Frutos =

Spanish politician

Noelia Frutos Rubio (born 27 December 1986) is a Spanish politician. She has dwarfism and uses a wheelchair. A member of the Spanish Socialist Workers' Party (PSOE), she was elected to the Cortes of Castile and León in 2019, representing the Burgos constituency. She resigned due to health reasons in 2025.

== Biography ==
Born in Burgos in Castile and León, Frutos joined the Spanish Socialist Workers' Party (PSOE) in 2014, having earlier been a member of its youth wing, the Unified Socialist Youth. She worked as a web and graphic designer.

Already a spokesperson for the Socialist Party of Castile and León, Frutos was named fourth on the PSOE list in the Burgos constituency for the 2019 Castilian-Leonese regional election. Five members of the party were elected by the constituency, including Frutos. The Seat of the Cortes of Castile and León, despite opening in 2007, was not fully accessible to her disability. As a temporary measure before permanent adaptations, it had to be adapted with an electric lift and a ramp, and for the voting buttons and microphone to be brought closer to her.

Frutos was once again in fourth place in the PSOE list for Burgos in the 2022 Castilian-Leonese regional election. In May 2022, during a parliamentary discussion on disability, regional Vox leader and vice president of the Regional Government of Castile and León, Juan García-Gallardo said to Frutos "I'm not going to treat you condescendingly; I'm going to treat you as if you were a person like any other, not like your team does". Frutos asked for an apology from the President of the Regional Government of Castile and León, Alfonso Fernández Mañueco of the People's Party (PP). When it arrived, she criticised it as unsatisfactory in not condemning García-Gallardo.

On 10 July 2025, Frutos resigned due to health reasons. Luis Tudanca, who led the PSOE in Castile and León at the time of her election, said "She has taught us many things. How to overcome, how to fight, how to take on the far right. She has taught us to want and to be able to, with socialist conviction and indefatigable commitment. We will carry on fighting".
