= Elvira Medina =

Spanish sculptor and painter

- Born: Elvira Medina Castro; 31 July 1911; Serrada, Spain
- Died: 1998
- Known for: Sculptor, portrait painter

Elvira Medina Castro (31 July 1911 – 1998) was a Spanish sculptor and painter specialist in portraits.

She was born in Serrada into a family dedicated to arts and culture. She was the daughter of the poet César de Medina Bocos and the sister of the also sculptor José Luis Medina.

Medina cultivated sculpture and painting, although the latter was his main profession. In 1956 she held his first individual exhibition in Valladolid. After making herself known to the public, she also exhibited her work in Madrid, where she established his residence since 1967. In the Spanish capital she had participated in the 1st Hispano-American Art Biennial. Precursors and Spanish masters of contemporary painting at the National Museum of Contemporary Art which lasted from the October 12, 1951 to February 28, 1952.

In 1976 she won the Preciados Gallery Prize of the San Isidro Plastic Arts Contest organized by the National Association of Painters and Sculptors, and the City Council of Madrid.

She is recognized for her portraits, highlighting those made of Félix Rodríguez de la Fuente and the Marqués de Lozoya. Her portrait of Count Albert Thill is exhibited at the Philadelphia Museum of Art.

On 7 March 2008, the City Council of Valladolid named a street in the city after her.
