= San Jose College, Valladolid =

- Spanish: Colegio San José

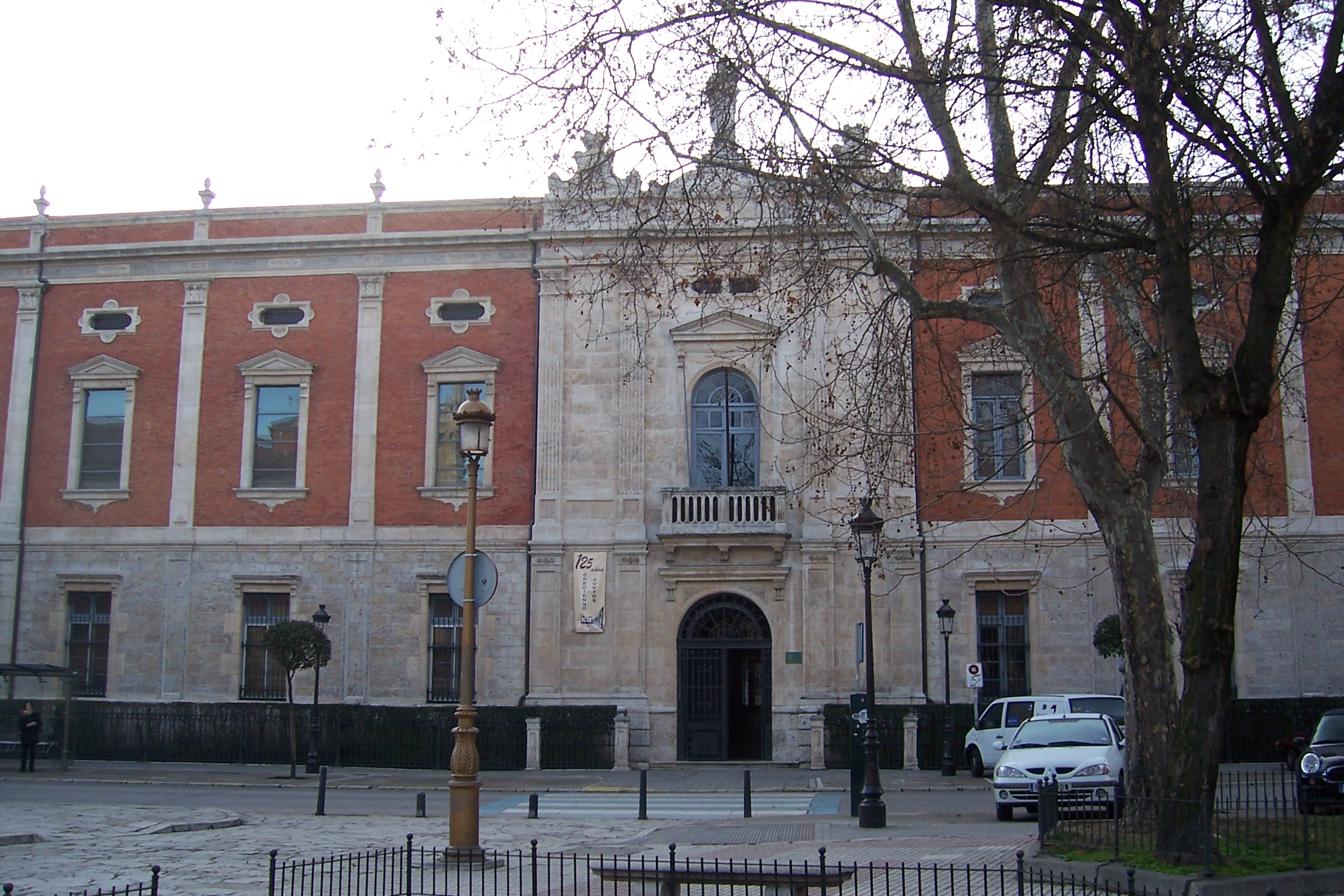

Location
- Valladolid, Castile and León; Spain
- Coordinates: 41°39′2.32″N 4°43′13.97″W

Information
- Type: Private primary and secondary school
- Religious affiliation: Catholic
- Denomination: Jesuit
- Established: 1881; 145 years ago
- Director: Carlos Entrambasaguas
- Teaching staff: 84
- Grades: K-12, including baccalaureate
- Gender: Co-educational
- Enrollment: 1,248
- Website: www.colegiosanjose.org

San Jose College (Spanish: Colegio San José) is a private Catholic primary and secondary school, located in Valladolid, in the autonomous community of Castile and León, Spain. The school was founded by the Society of Jesus in 1881 and teaches pre-primary, primary, high school (ESO), and baccalaureate. Designed by Ortiz de Urbina, the school building is considered a good example of the eclecticism of the time.

== History ==
In 1881 the Society of Jesus received an important donation from Justa López Martínez, making it possible to start the Colegio de San José in the now demolished Plazuela del Duque nr. 7, next to the Church of San Juan. A year later in 1882, the Jesuits obtained the land of the Gregorio Remón asked the City Council for permission to expand the campus of the school. The foundation stone was laid on 8 June 1882, the feast of Corpus Christi. The building was completed in 1884 and occupied on January 30, 1885.

== Notable alumni ==
- Juan Hernández Saravia - General and Minister of Defence during the Second Spanish Republic
- Tomás Villanueva - Vice-president of the Board of Castile and León

== Gallery ==
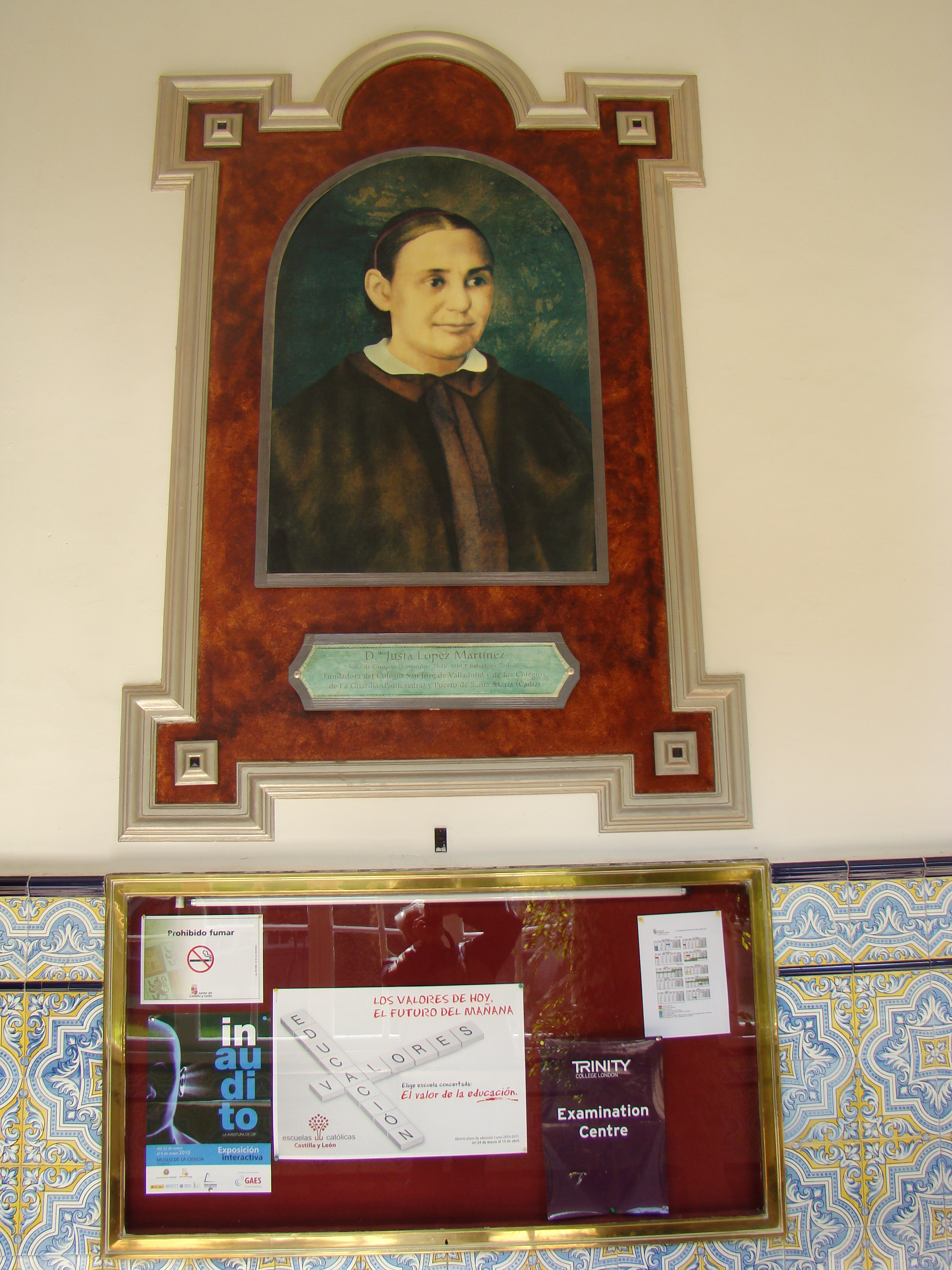
Justa López Martínez

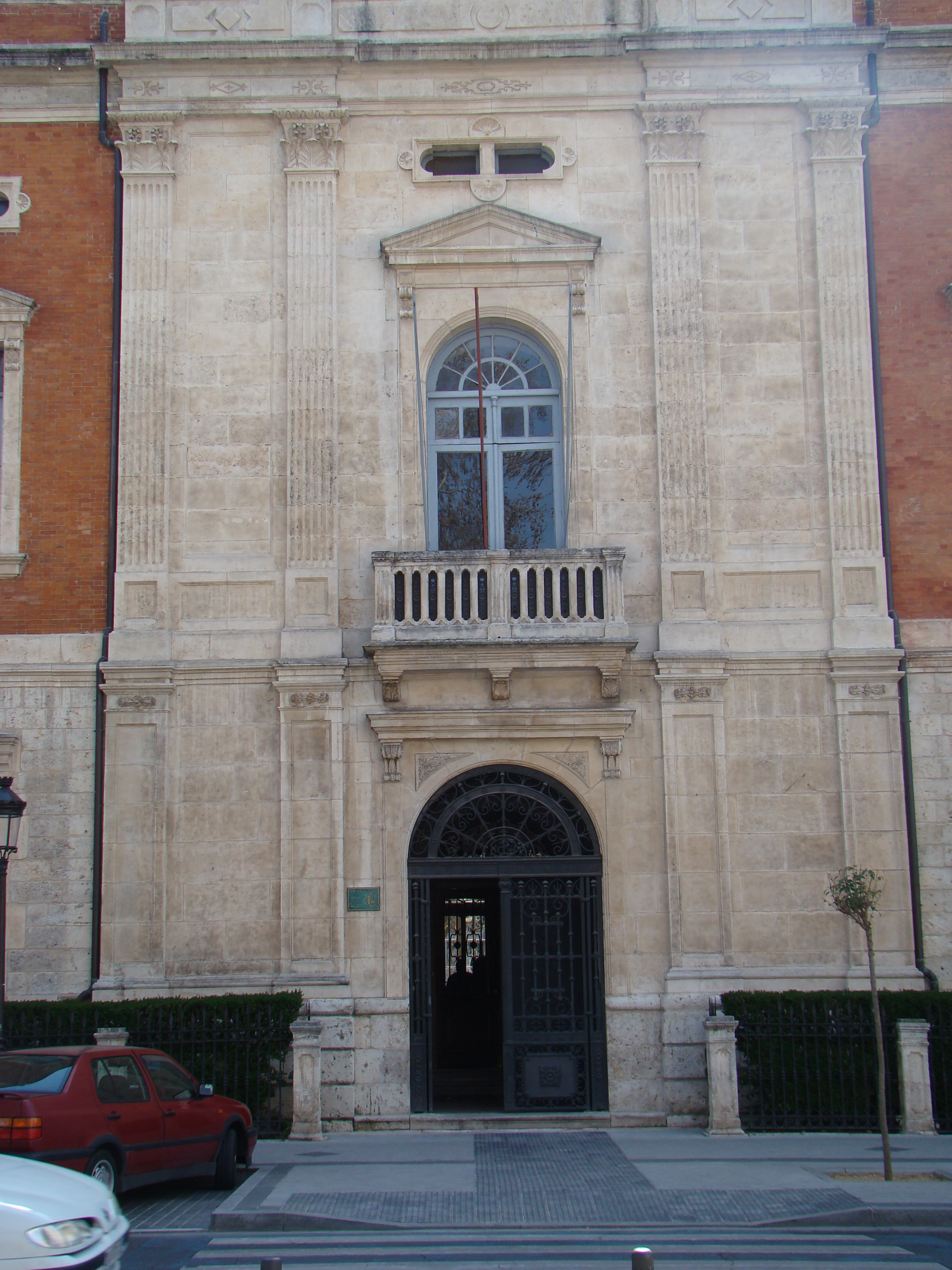
Main entrance

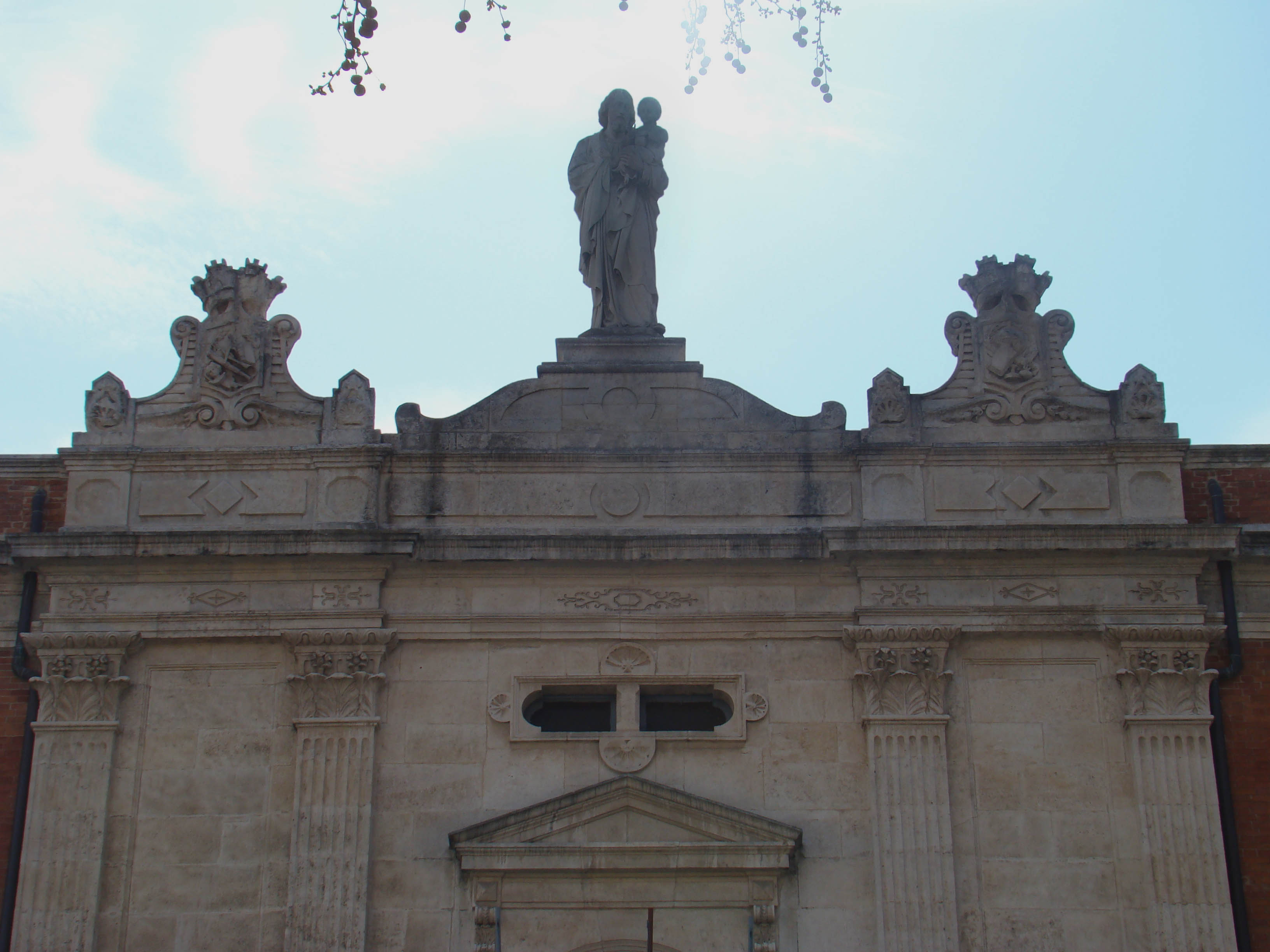
Shields symbolizing arts & sciences

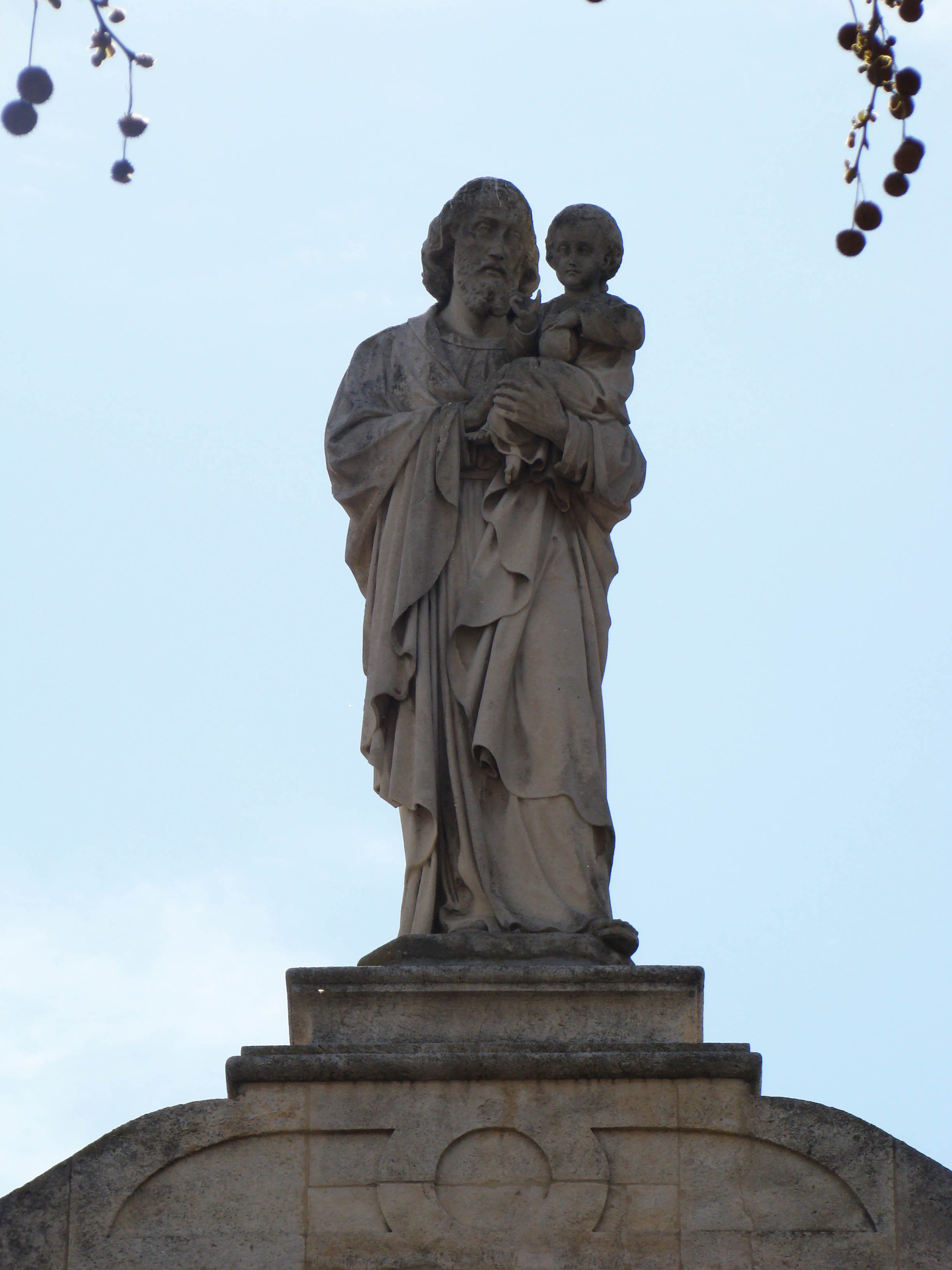
St. Joseph

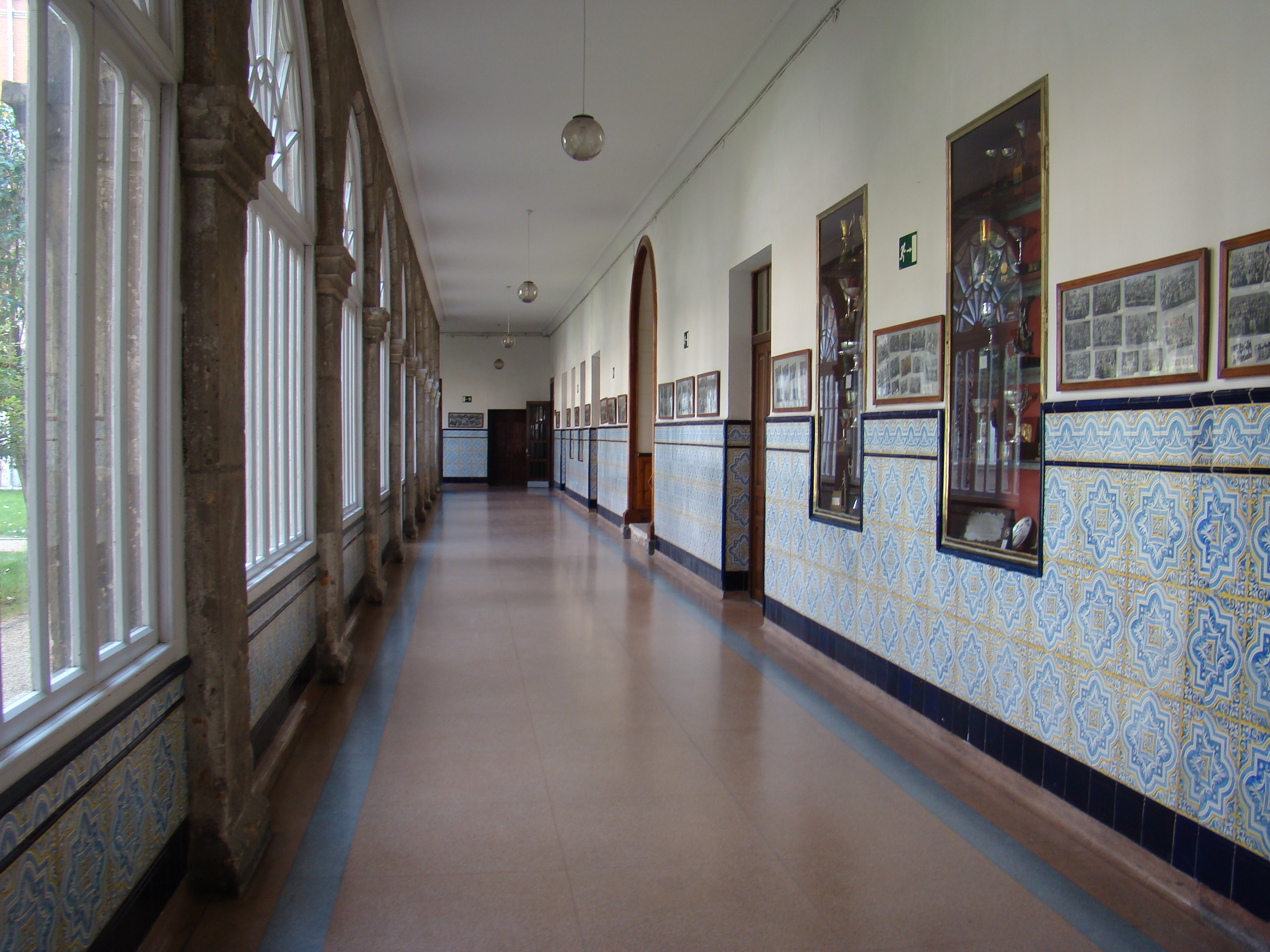
Gallery with student photographs

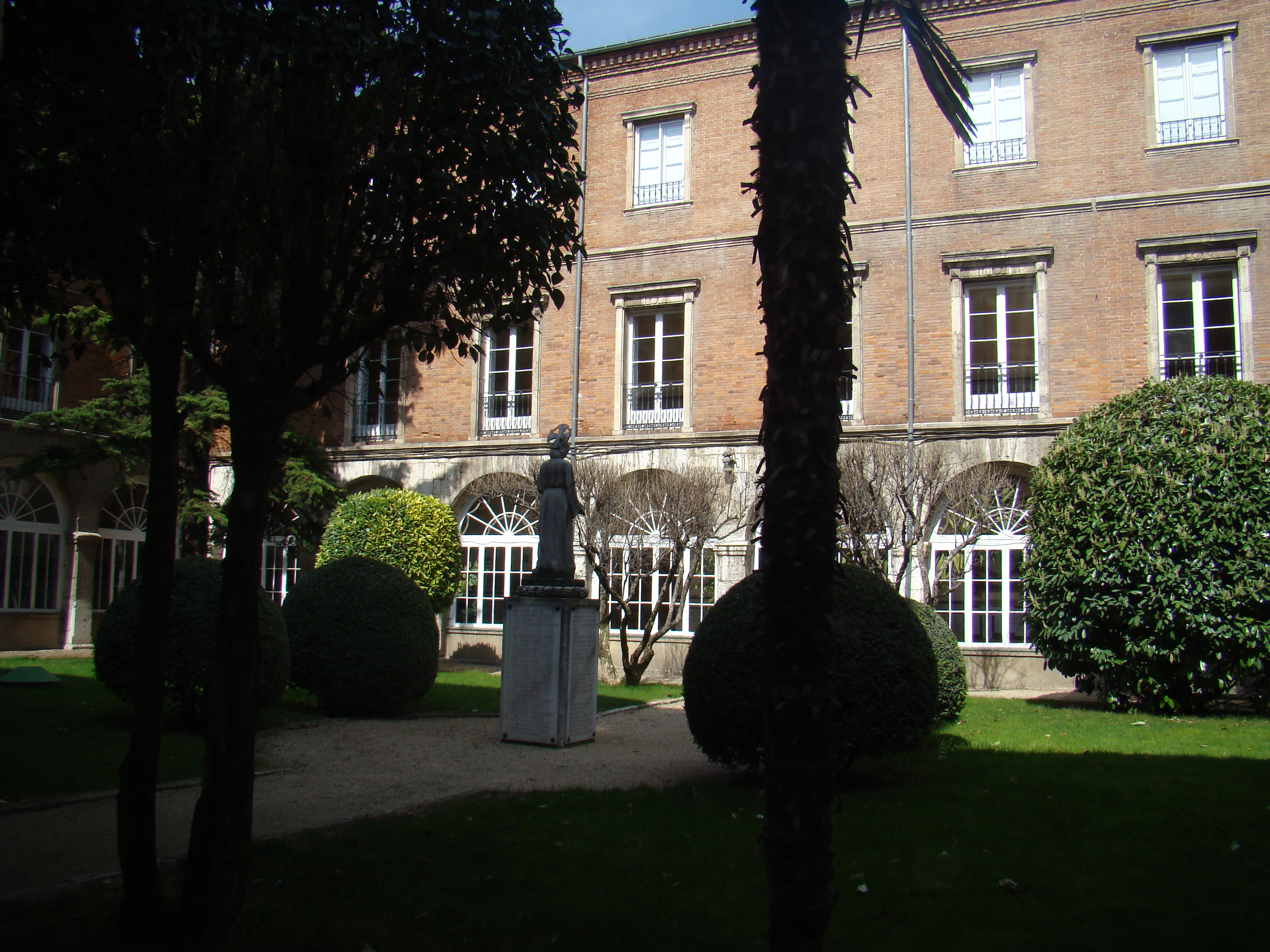
Inner courtyard garden

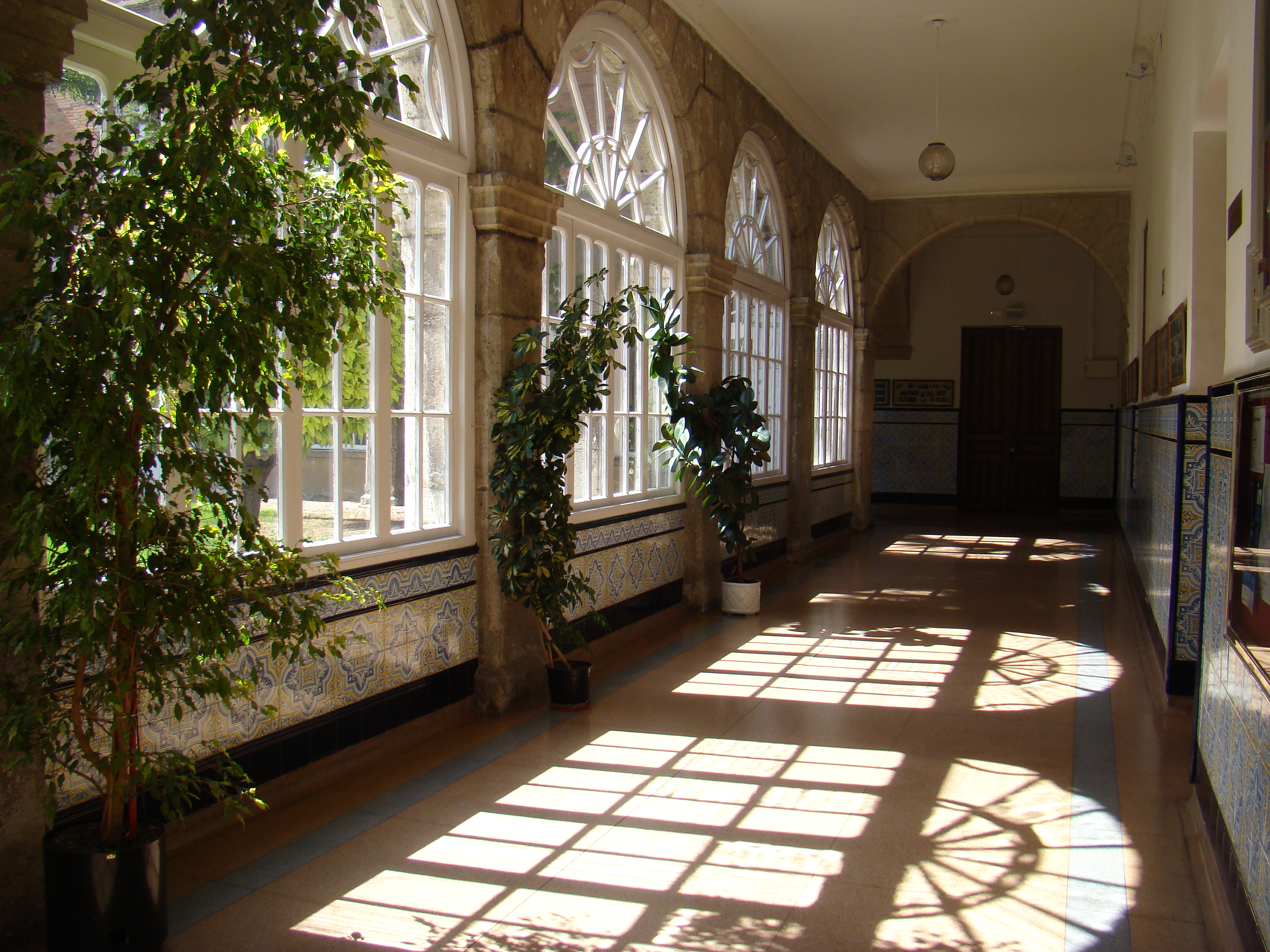
Large gallery surrounding courtyard

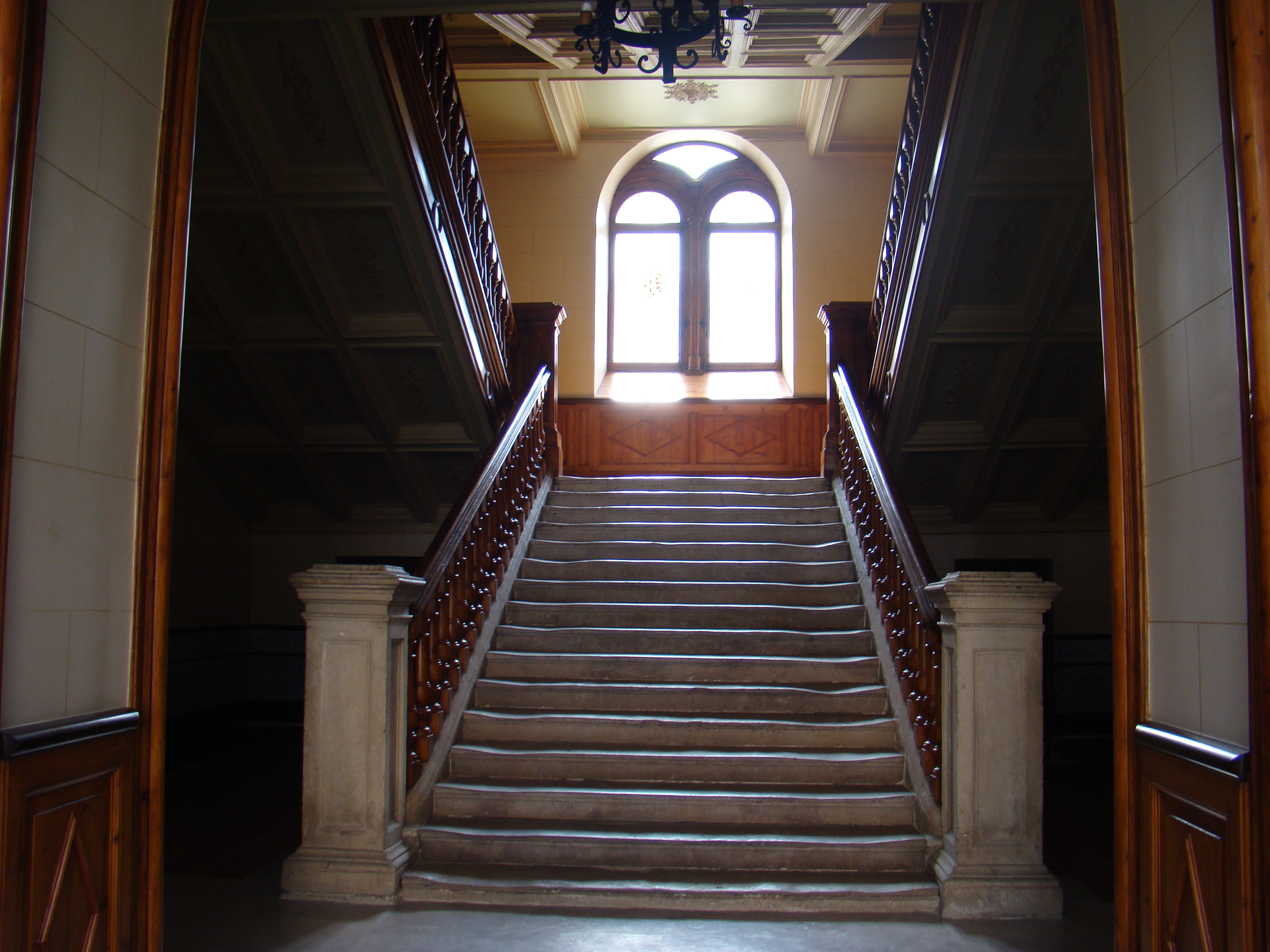
Old staircase with worn stone steps

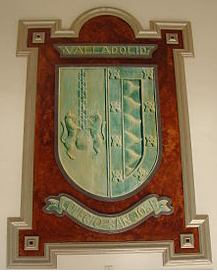
Shield of San Jose College

== See also ==
- Catholic Church in Spain
- Education in Spain
- List of Jesuit schools
