= Juan García-Gallardo =

Spanish lawyer and politician

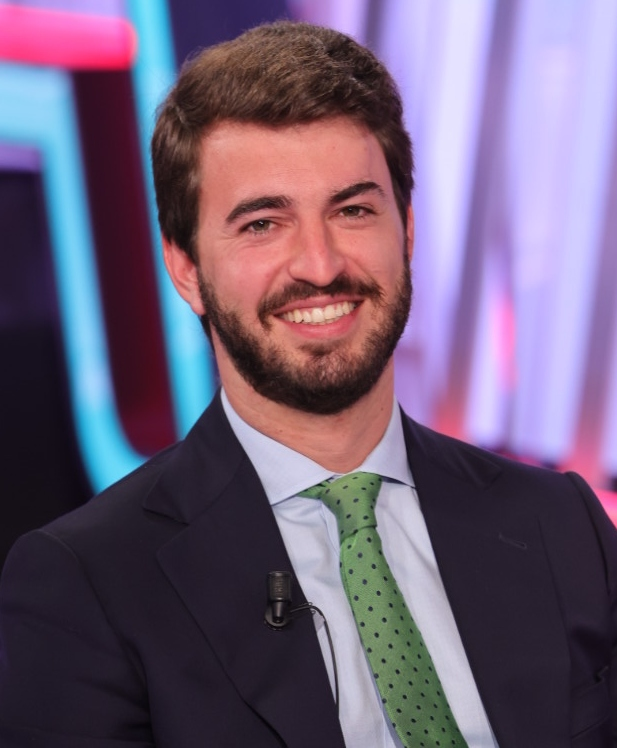

Vice President of Castile and León
- In office 20 April 2022 – 12 July 2024
- President: Alfonso Fernández Mañueco
- Preceded by: Francisco Igea
- Succeeded by: Isabel Blanco Llamas

Member of the Cortes of Castile and León
- In office 10 March 2022 – 3 February 2025
- Constituency: Valladolid

Spokesperson of the Vox Parliamentary Group in the Cortes of Castile and León
- In office 10 March 2022 – 20 April 2022
- Preceded by: Office established
- Succeeded by: Carlos Menéndez Blanco

Personal details
- Born: Juan Manuel García-Gallardo Frings; 18 March 1991 (age 35) Burgos, Castile and León, Spain
- Party: Vox
- Education: Comillas Pontifical University, University of Deusto

Juan Manuel García-Gallardo Frings (born 18 March 1991) is a Spanish lawyer and former politician of the Vox party.

García-Gallardo led Vox in the 2022 Castilian-Leonese regional election, in which they became the third-biggest group in the Cortes of Castile and León. They formed a coalition government with the People's Party (PP) and he became Vice President to the PP leader Alfonso Fernández Mañueco. García-Gallardo resigned from this post in July 2024 due to a dispute with the PP on the subject of immigration. In February 2025, he resigned his seat and all internal positions within Vox due to a dispute with the leadership.

== Early life ==
Born in Burgos, García-Gallardo studied the Bachelor's degree in Law at the Comillas Pontifical University with a diploma in International Legal Studies (2009–2014) and took the master's degree in Legal Practice and a master's degree in Business Law from the University of Deusto (2013–2014). After passing the Spanish Bar Examination, he obtained the title of lawyer (licence). He won regional titles in horse riding, and took part in the debating world championship in Madrid in 2013. In December 2016 he joined the law firm of his grandfather and father, both also named Juan Manuel.

== Political career ==
=== 2022 election campaign ===
In January 2022, García-Gallardo was announced as the lead candidate for Vox in snap elections to the Cortes of Castile and León. He had joined the party only the previous June. Soon after his nomination, he deleted historical tweets that he had made about LGBT people, feminists, Romani and immigrants; in 2011 he had written "It seems a good idea to me to bring back Raúl for the Euros. We need to heterosexualise this sport that's full of faggots". He defended this particular remark as "a football joke when I didn't even have a moustache".

During the campaign, he pledged to align with the governing People's Party (PP), whom he considered to be "addicted to power". He said that there would be no alliance unless the PP enacted Vox's policies, which included financial incentives to increase the birth rate in the region.

In the election, Vox rose from one deputy to 13, with 17% of the vote, making it the third biggest party in the legislature. García-Gallardo told regional president Alfonso Fernández Mañueco (PP) that he would only form a coalition if two regional laws were repealed: a 2010 law on gender violence that Vox considers to be politically motivated and neglectful other forms of violence, and a 2018 law of historical memory that would allocate funds to associations for victims of Francisco Franco.

=== Regional vice president: 2022–2024 ===
On 10 March 2022, Mañueco formed a coalition government with Vox, with Vox having three of the ten ministers including García-Gallardo as vice president. The law on gender violence that Vox had criticised was replaced by a law on domestic violence regardless of gender, as the party had demanded. It was the first far-right entrance into a government in Spain since the transition to democracy from 1975 onwards. García-Gallardo's position as spokesperson of Vox in the legislature was taken on by Carlos Menéndez Blanco.

In May 2022, García-Gallardo caused controversy in a discussion with Noelia Frutos in the Cortes. The discussion was on women and disabilities, and the Spanish Socialist Workers' Party (PSOE) deputy has dwarfism and uses a wheelchair. García-Gallardo had said "Look Mrs Frutos, I am not going to condescend to you and I am going to respond to your lack of respect as if you were a person like any other, not how your parliamentary group does, as I will expand upon later". He said that his statement was about meritocracy and it was being manipulated by his political rivals.

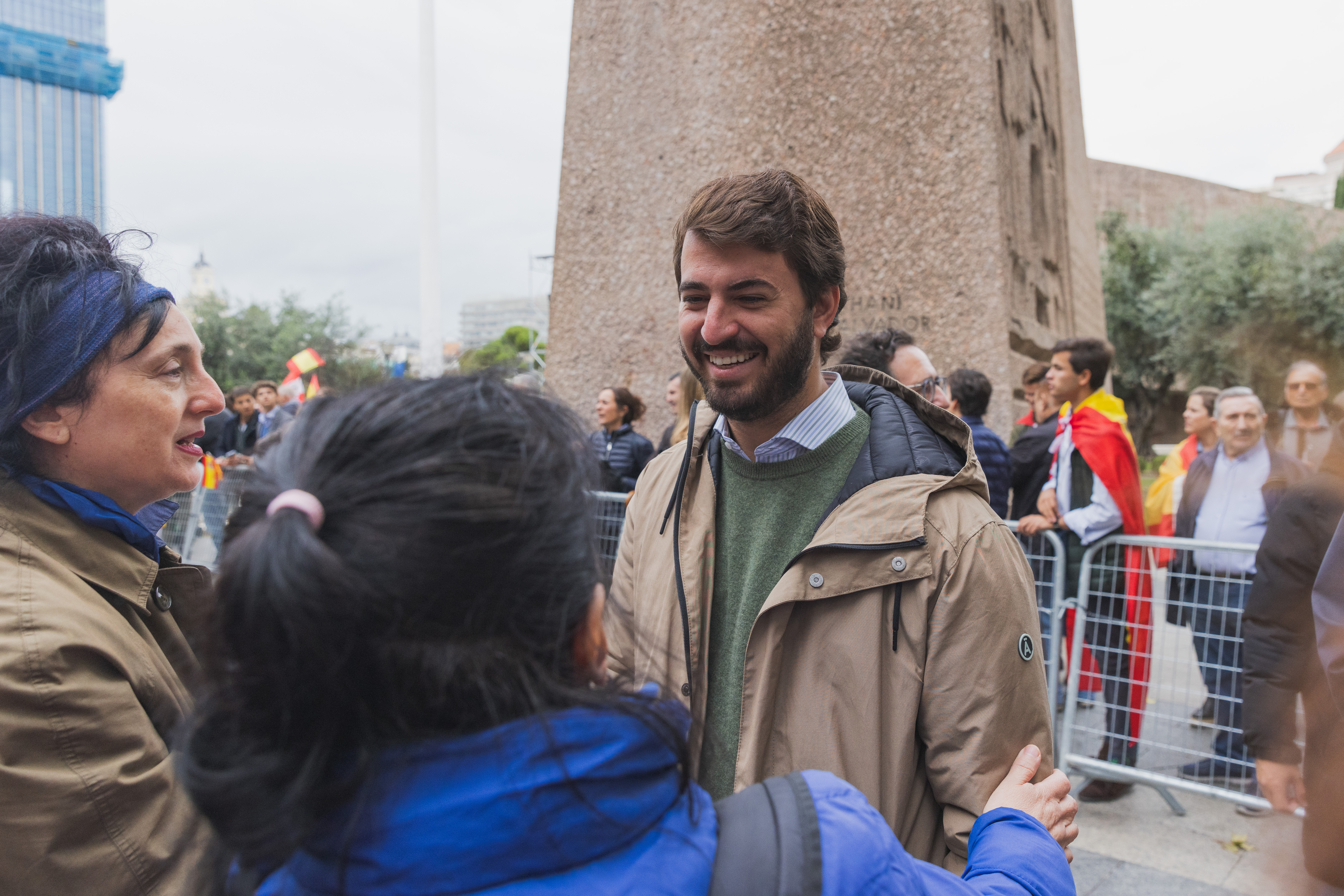
García-Gallardo in October 2023, at protests against the government of Pedro Sánchez.

García-Gallardo proposed legislation in January 2023 that would mandate abortion clinics to offer an ultrasound scan or a chance to listen to the fetal heartbeat before the procedure. The measures were overturned by the PP after the PSOE-led central government threatened to block it in the courts or bring about direct rule in Castile and León as a final resort. Leading PP figures such as President of the Community of Madrid Isabel Díaz Ayuso and Campaign Committee president Borja Sémper criticised the measures as needlessly provocative. He also proposed the abolition of regional laws against gender violence on the grounds that such legislation is "an anomaly in the civilised world" and on the idea that "heartless women file false complaints".

In July 2024, García-Gallardo threatened Mañueco with breaking the coalition agreement if the PP government went through with plans to accommodate unaccompanied migrant children, known in Spain by the acronym menas (Menor extranjero no acompañado). He resigned on 12 July, saying that even the plan to accommodate 20 migrants was too many, and that he did not want Castile and León to turn into the banlieues of Paris or the Swedish city of Malmö.

=== 2025: Resignation and return to legal practice ===
On 3 February 2025, García-Gallardo resigned his seat in the Cortes of Castile and León and all internal positions within Vox. He returned to the legal profession and to grassroots membership of Vox. In an open letter of resignation, he referred to Vox's leadership as an unshakeable "oligarchy". David Hierro, a deputy from Palencia, succeeded him as Vox leader in the region.
