= Antonio María Sáez Aguado =

Spanish politician (born 1955)

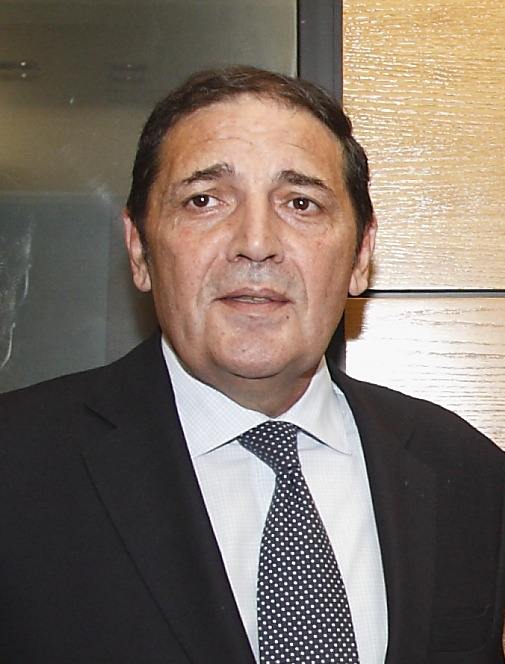

Minister of Health of the Junta of Castile and León
- In office 2015–2019
- President: Juan Vicente Herrera
- Preceded by: Francisco Javier Álvarez Guisasola
- Succeeded by: Verónica Casado

Personal details
- Born: 1955 (age 70–71) Palencia, Spain
- Party: People's Party
- Education: University of Valladolid
- Occupation: Politician; Doctor

Antonio María Sáez Aguado (born 1955) is a Spanish politician and doctor. He is a member of the People's Party. He was the minister of health of the Junta of Castile and León from 2015 to 2019. He was appointed health minister of the Junta of Castile and León on 27 June 2011 until July 2019. He held positions of general director of public health and managing director of the regional management of health of Castile and León.

== Biography ==
Antonio was born in Palencia, Spain on 1955. He studied at the University of Valladolid. He graduated in medicine and surgery from the University of Valladolid in 1980. He is a university specialist in hospital management since 1993. He was also an associate professor at the faculty of psychology at the University of Salamanca.
