= Milagros Marcos =

Spanish politician

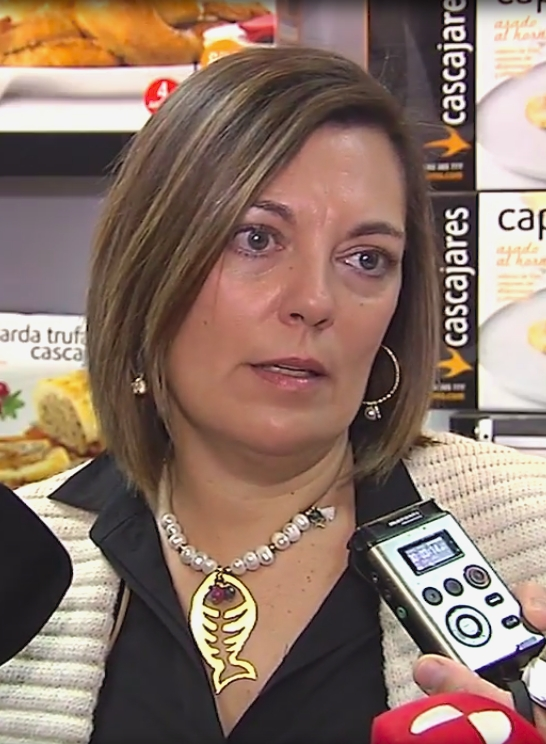
- Milagros Marcos

Minister of Agriculture and Livestock of the Junta of Castile and León
- In office 8 June 2011 – 21 March 2019
- President: Juan Vicente Herrera
- Preceded by: Silvia Clemente
- Succeeded by: Jesús Julio Carnero

Minister for Families and Equality of the Junta of Castile and León
- In office 27 June 2011 – 8 July 2015
- President: Juan Vicente Herrera
- Preceded by: César Antón
- Succeeded by: Alicia García Rodríguez

Spokesman of the Junta of Castile and León
- In office 10 September 2016 – 21 March 2019 Juan Vicente Herrera
- Preceded by: Rosa Valdeón
- Succeeded by: José Antonio de Santiago-Juárez

Deputy in the Cortes Generales for Palencia
- Incumbent
- Assumed office 21 May 2019

Personal details
- Born: Milagros Marcos Ortega; 14 June 1965 (age 61) Palencia, Spain
- Party: People's Party
- Education: University of Valladolid
- Occupation: Politician civil servant

Milagros Marcos Ortega (born 14 June 1965) is a Spanish politician and civil servant. She is a member of the People's Party of Castile and León, and was the minister of agriculture and livestock of the Junta of Castile and León from 2011 to 2019. Milagros Marcos also elected deputy of the XIII and XIV legislatures. She was councilor for family and equality and manager of social services.

== Biography ==
Milagros Marcos was born in Palencia, Spain. Milagros Marcos is married and has two children. She studied at the University of Valladolid and received a bachelor of philosophy from the University of Valladolid. Milagros Marcos is general director of health and social planning. Milagros Marcos was spokesman of the Junta of Castile and León, from 2016 to 2019. Milagros Marcos was also in charge of the departments of culture, environment and health in the Junta of Castile and León.
