= Rosa Valdeón =

Spanish politician

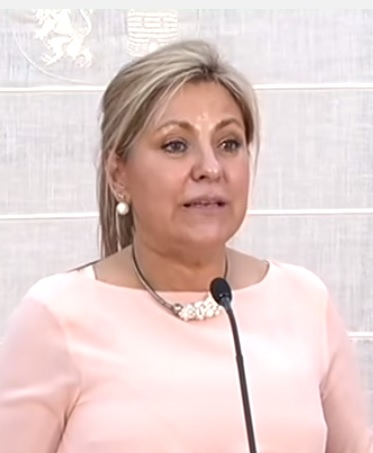
- Rosa Valdeón

Minister of Economy and Finance
- In office 8 July 2015 – 10 September 2016
- President: Juan Vicente Herrera
- Preceded by: Tomás Villanueva
- Succeeded by: Carlos Fernández Carriedo

Vice–Presidente of the Junta of Castile and León
- In office 8 July 2015 – 10 September 2016
- President: Juan Vicente Herrera
- Preceded by: María Jesús Ruiz Ruiz
- Succeeded by: José Antonio de Santiago-Juárez

Procurator of the Cortes of Castile and León
- In office 25 May 2003 – 27 May 2007

Councilor for Family and Equal Opportunities of the Junta of Castile and León
- In office 4 July 2003 – 16 June 2007
- President: Juan Vicente Herrera
- Succeeded by: César Antón Beltrán

Mayor of Zamora
- In office 16 June 2007 – 13 June 2015
- Preceded by: Antonio Vázquez Jiménez
- Succeeded by: Francisco Guarido

Personal details
- Born: Rosa María Valdeón Santiago; 17 December 1960 (age 65) Toro, Zamora, Spain
- Party: People's Party
- Education: University of Salamanca
- Occupation: Politician; Physician

Rosa María Valdeón Santiago (born 17 December 1960) is a Spanish politician and physician. Rosa Valdeón is a member of the People's Party of Castile and León. Rosa Valdeón was the Minister of Economy and Finance of Castile and León, in office from 8 July 2015 to 10 September 2016. She was the mayor of Zamora from 2007 to 2015. Rosa Valdeón was also the procurator of the Cortes of Castile and León. Rosa Valdeón held the position of general director of public health at the Junta of Castile and León from 2001 to 2003.

== Biography ==
Rosa Valdeón was born in Toro, Zamora, Spain. She studied at the University of Salamanca. Rosa Valdeón was vice–presidente of the Junta of Castile and León from 2015 to 2016. Rosa Valdeón served as medical inspector of social security. Rosa Valdeón is a member of the National Executive Committee of the People's Party. Rosa Valdeón also elected to councilor for family and equal opportunities of the Junta of Castile and León from 2003 to 2007.
