= Antolín de Santiago =

Spanish politician (born 1918)

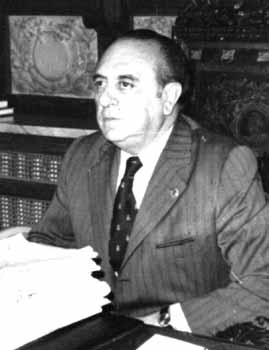

Mayor of Valladolid
- In office 12 August 1971 – 12 February 1974
- Preceded by: Martín Santos Romero
- Succeeded by: Julio Hernández Díez

Civil Governor of the Province of Cádiz
- In office February 1974 – August 1977
- Succeeded by: José María Sanz-Pastor y Mellado

Civil Governor of the Province of Burgos
- In office August 1977 – July 1980
- Preceded by: Jesús Gay Ruidíaz
- Succeeded by: Manuel del Hoyo Aguilera

Procurator in the Francoist Courts
- In office 1971–1974

Personal details
- Born: Antolín Luis de Santiago y Juárez; 9 October 1918 Salamanca, Castile and León, Spain
- Party: FET y de las JONS
- Children: José Antonio de Santiago-Juárez
- Occupation: Politician; Lawyer; Professor; Journalist

Antolín Luis de Santiago y Juárez (born 9 October 1918, date of death unknown) was a Spanish politician, lawyer, academic and journalist He was a member of the FET y de las JONS party, and was the Mayor of Valladolid from 12 August 1971 to 12 February 1974. He was worked as a representative in the city of information and tourism in Valladolid. He served as the civil governor of the Province of Cádiz from February 1974 to August 1977, who was also re-elected to the civil governor of the Province of Burgos, in office from August 1977 to July 1980. He retired from politics after 1980. He was the procurator in the francoist courts from 1971 to 1974. After his son came into politics, he moved away from politics after that.

== Life and career ==
Antolín de Santiago was born in Salamanca, Castile and León on 9 October 1918. He graduated from the University of Valladolid.

Santiago was an academic, and worked as a university professor for some time. He was also an advocate in court in Valladolid, as well as engaging in professional journalism.

Santiago was married to María, and had a son, José Antonio de Santiago-Juárez, who is also a politician. Maria died on 20 February 2012, at the age of 90. Her obituary notes that Antolín de Santiago predeceased her.

Political offices
Preceded by Martín Santos Romero	Mayor of Valladolid; 12 August 1971 – 12 February 1974	Succeeded by Julio Hernández Díez
Preceded by –	Civil Governor of the Province of Cádiz; February 1974 – August 1977	Succeeded by José María Sanz-Pastor y Mellado
Preceded by Jesús Gay Ruidíaz	Civil Governor of the Province of Burgos; August 1977 – July 1980	Succeeded by Manuel del Hoyo Aguilera
Preceded by –	Procurator in the Francoist Courts; 1971 – 1974	Succeeded by –
