= David Hierro =

Spanish politician

David Hierro Santos (born 1978) is a Spanish politician of the party Vox. He was elected to the Cortes of Castile and León in 2022 and became his party's spokesman in the legislature in 2025, and was re-elected to the Cortes in 2026.

== Biography ==
Hierro was born in Palencia in Castile and León and has two children as of 2025. He graduated with a history degree from the University of Valladolid, specialising in prehistory, archaeology, ancient and medieval history. He has contributed to archaeological investigations by his alma mater, as well as working as a business consultant.

Hierro joined Vox in February 2014. In the 2022 Castilian-Leonese regional election, he was the only Vox member among seven deputies elected to the Cortes of Castile and León by the Palencia constituency; he had been a consultant for the party group in the previous parliamentary term. On 3 February 2025, when Juan García-Gallardo quit frontline politics, Hierro succeeded him as Vox's leader in Castile and León. In the 2026 Castilian-Leonese regional election, President of the Cortes Carlos Pollán led Vox's entire campaign, while Hierro led their list in Palencia; he retained his seat while the People's Party (PP) and Spanish Socialist Workers' Party (PSOE) shared the remaining six.

== Political positions ==
In 2025, El Español reported that Vox members in Castile and León considered Hierro to be aligned with the party's central leadership under Santiago Abascal. Upon taking control of the party in the region, Hierro rejected his predecessor García-Gallardo's allegation of Vox being run as an oligarchy. Hierro disagreed with being called the regional leader of Vox, saying that the leader in all regions was Abascal.

Hierro is an opponent of organised labour, and has alleged that union leaders have control over the PP. He opposes the 2030 Agenda, and tore up a document relating to it in the Cortes, subsequently uploading the photo of the incident as his profile picture on Twitter.
