= Aspariegos =

Place in Castile and León, Spain

Coordinates: 41°41′N 5°36′W

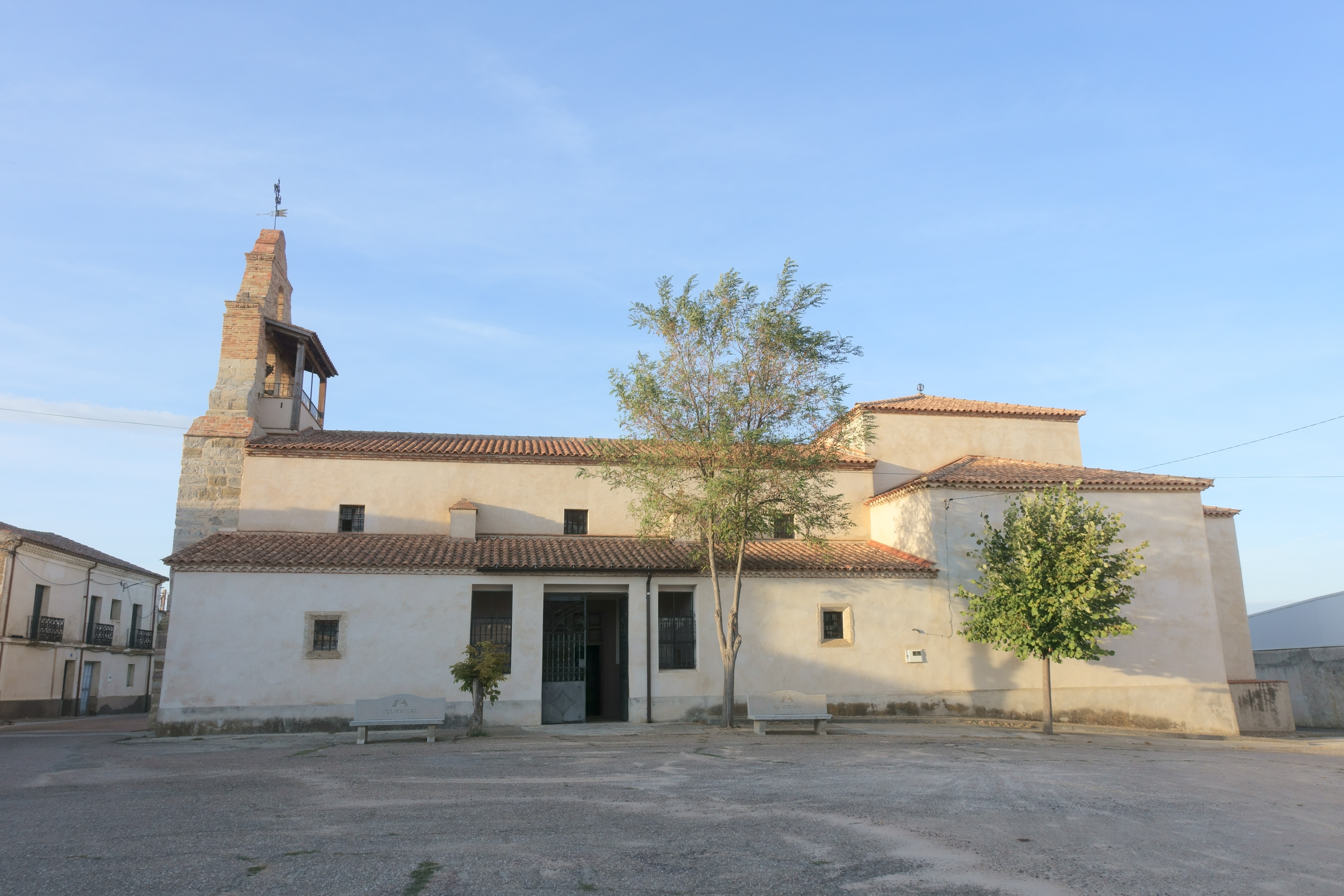

- Flag Coat of arms
- Interactive map of Aspariegos
- Country: Spain
- Autonomous community: Castile and León
- Province: Zamora
- Municipality: Aspariegos

Area
  - Total: 41 km^{2} (16 sq mi)

Population (2025-01-01)
  - Total: 223
  - Density: 5.4/km^{2} (14/sq mi)
- Time zone: UTC+1 (CET)
  - Summer (DST): UTC+2 (CEST)
- Website: www.aspariegos.com

Aspariegos is a municipality located in the province of Zamora, Castile and León, Spain. According to the 2009 census (INE), the municipality has a population of 297 inhabitants.
