= Serrada =

- Municipality
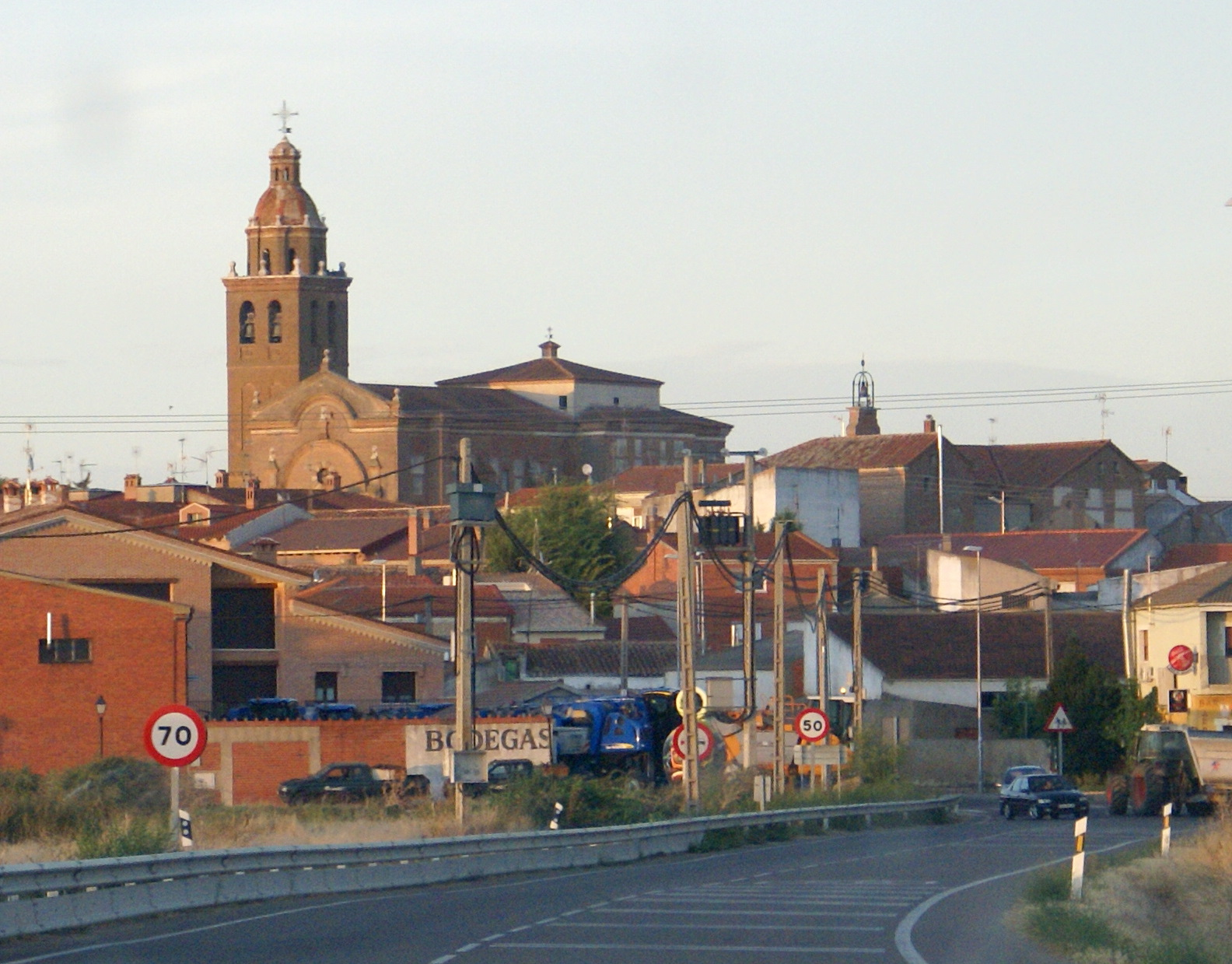
- View of Serrada

- Flag Coat of arms

- Location in Spain
- Coordinates: 41°27′33″N 4°51′40″W
- Country: Spain
- Autonomous community: Castile and León
- Province: Valladolid
- Comarca: Tierra del Vino

Area
  - Total: 24.19 km^{2} (9.34 sq mi)
- Elevation: 722 m (2,369 ft)

Population (2025-01-01)
  - Total: 1,117
  - Density: 46.18/km^{2} (119.6/sq mi)
- Time zone: UTC+1 (CET)
  - Summer (DST): UTC+2 (CEST)
- Postal code: 47239

Serrada is a municipality in the province of Valladolid, Castile and León, Spain.
