= Tomás Villanueva =

Spanish politician

- Tomás Villanueva
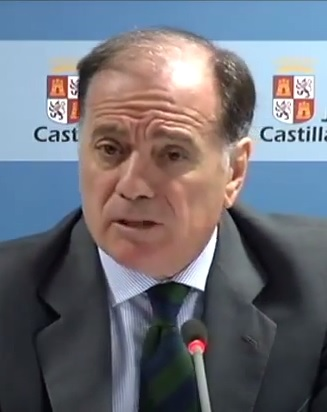
- Villanueva in 2012

Minister of Economics and Employment of the Junta of Castile and León
- In office 4 July 2003 – 8 July 2015
- President: Juan Vicente Herrera
- Preceded by: Isabel Carrasco Lorenzo

Vice President of the Junta of Castile and León
- In office 20 March 2001 – 4 July 2003
- President: Juan Vicente Herrera
- Preceded by: José Manuel Fernández Santiago
- Succeeded by: María Jesús Ruiz Ruiz

Second Vice President of the Junta of Castile and León
- In office 4 July 2003 – 27 June 2011
- President: Juan Vicente Herrera
- Preceded by: Office created
- Succeeded by: Office abolished
- In office 15 July 1999 – 20 March 2001
- President: Juan José Lucas
- Preceded by: Office created
- Succeeded by: Office abolished

Minister of Education of the Junta of Castile and León
- In office 15 July 1999 – 4 July 2003
- President: Juan José Lucas; Juan Vicente Herrera
- Preceded by: Josefa Fernández Arufe
- Succeeded by: Francisco Javier Álvarez Guisasola

Minister of Industry, Commerce, and Tourism of the Junta of Castile and León
- In office 17 July 1995 – 15 July 1999
- President: Juan José Lucas
- Preceded by: None
- Succeeded by: José Juan Pérez Tabernero

Member of the Cortes of Castile and León
- In office 28 May 1995 – 2015
- Constituency: Valladolid

Personal details
- Born: 25 February 1953 Valladolid, Spain
- Died: 7 September 2017 (aged 64) Tordesillas, Spain
- Party: People's Party

Tomás Félix Villanueva Rodríguez (25 February 1953 – 7 September 2017) was a Spanish politician. He was born in Valladolid and held several positions in the Junta of Castile and León. He was involved in various corruption scandals, and was set to appear before court in late 2017. However, on 7 September 2017, at the age of 64, Villanueva died suddenly of a heart attack.
