= José Antonio de Santiago-Juárez =

Spanish politician

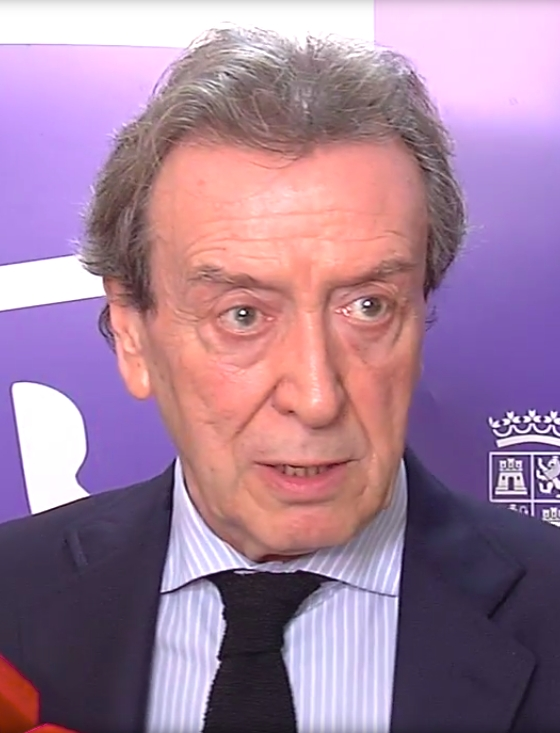

Councilor of the Valladolid
- Incumbent
- Assumed office 15 June 2019

Ministry of the Presidency of the Junta of Castile and León Secretary of the Governing Council
- In office 8 July 2015 – 26 May 2019

Procurator of the Cortes of Castile and León by Valladolid
- In office 13 June 2011 – 31 March 2015

Counselor to the Presidency Spokesman of the Junta of Castile and León Secretary of the Governing Council
- In office 28 June 2011 – 8 July 2015
- Preceded by: María Jesús Ruiz

Procurator of the Cortes of Castile and León by Valladolid
- Incumbent
- Assumed office 22 June 2015

Personal details
- Born: 18 November 1951 (age 74) Valladolid, Spain
- Party: People's Party
- Spouse: Concha
- Children: Paula
- Parent: Antolín de Santiago
- Education: University of Valladolid
- Occupation: Politician; Psychologist

José Antonio de Santiago-Juárez (born 18 November 1951) is a Spanish politician and psychologist. He is a member of the People's Party of Castile and León, and was the ministry of the presidency of the Junta of Castile and León from 2015 to 2019. He is the current Councilor of the Valladolid, in office from 15 June 2015. He was elected for the first time, to the Councilor of the Valladolid. He was elected procurator of the Cortes of Castile and León from 2011 to 2015, who was re-elected to the current Councilor of the Valladolid, in office from 22 June 2015. He was president of the electoral committee of the popular party of castile and león from 2012 to 2015.

== Biography ==
José Antonio was born in Valladolid, Spain. He married Concha and has a daughter named Paula. His father Antolín de Santiago was also a politician. He ‍was acquired his degree in medicine and surgery from University of Valladolid. He served as vice president of the Junta of Castile and León from 2016 to 2019. He was a member of the national board of directors of the popular party from 2008 to 2015. He became president of the national research institute for medicine under the ministry of home affairs. He earned a degree in specialty of psychiatry.
