= Ángel Ibáñez Hernando =

Spanish politician

Ángel Ibáñez
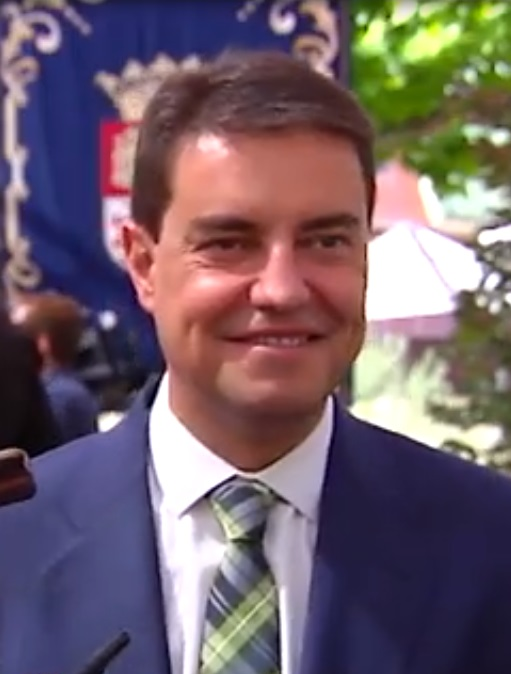

Minister of the Presidency
- Incumbent
- Assumed office 17 July 2019

Personal details
- Born: Ángel Mariano Ibáñez Hernando; 1 December 1974 (age 51) Burgos, Spain
- Party: People's Party
- Education: University of Burgos

Ángel Mariano Ibáñez Hernando (born 1 December 1974) is a Spanish politician of the People's Party of Castile and León. He is the current president of Cortes of Castile and León, in office from 17 July 2019. He was elected deputy mayor, councilor for development and councilor for Sports of the Burgos City Council from 2011 to 2015.

== Biography ==
Ibáñez was born in Burgos, Spain. He earned a bachelor of chemical sciences from the University of Burgos. He was councilor of finance at the Burgos City Council from 2003 to 2011. He is part of the presidency commission, the organization, services and government of the territory of the Cortes of Castile and León and the regulations and statute commission. He also participated in the research commission on the Burgos University Hospital.
