= Jesús Julio Carnero =

Spanish politician

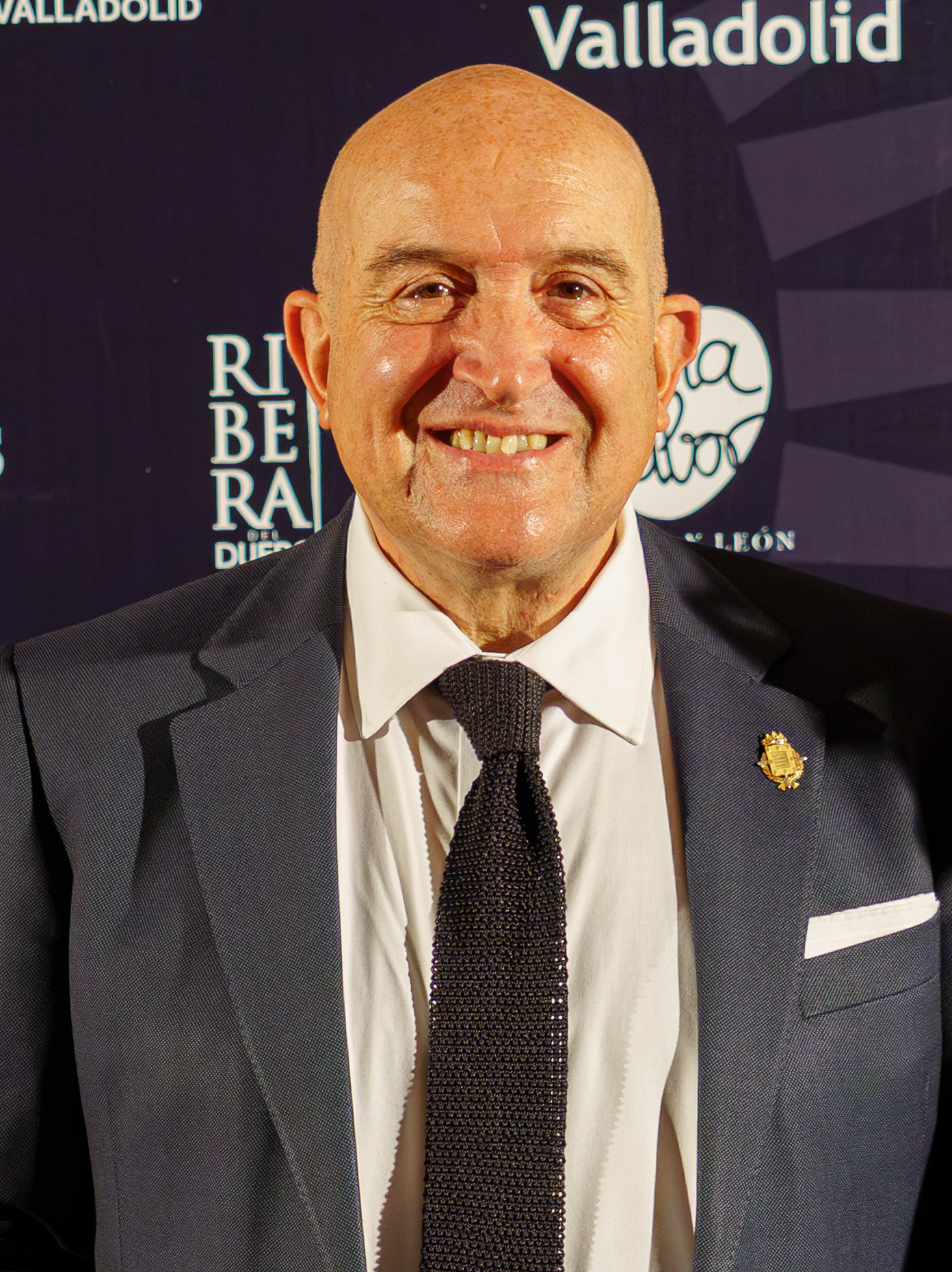
- Jesús Julio Carnero

Minister of Agriculture, Livestock and Rural Development of Castile and León
- In office 17 July 2019 – 20 April 2022
- Preceded by: Milagros Marcos
- Succeeded by: Gerardo Dueñas

President of the Deputation of Valladolid
- In office 22 June 2011 – 28 June 2019
- Preceded by: Ramiro Ruiz Medrano
- Succeeded by: Conrado Íscar

Mayor of Valladolid
- Incumbent
- Assumed office 18 June 2023
- Preceded by: Óscar Puente

Personal details
- Born: Jesús Julio Carnero García; 5 March 1964 (age 62) Aspariegos, Spain
- Party: People's Party
- Education: University of Valladolid

Jesús Julio Carnero García (born 5 March 1964) is a Spanish People's Party (PP) politician.

Born in Aspariegos, Province of Zamora, Castile and León, Carnero graduated in law from the University of Valladolid.

Carnero spent 80 days in hospital, of which 61 in intensive care and 35 in a coma, from June 2021 during the COVID-19 pandemic. He had three near-death experiences from pneumonia during that time.

In January 2023, Carnero was chosen as the PP candidate for mayor of Valladolid in the May elections. His party won 11 of 27 seats on the city council, the same as the Spanish Socialist Workers' Party (PSOE) of incumbent mayor Óscar Puente, who received marginally more votes. The PP reached an agreement with the three councillors of Vox to form a majority government, in which Vox leader Irene Carvajal became deputy mayor.

He was elected to the 15th Senate of Spain in the 2023 Spanish general election from Valladolid.
