= City Council of Valladolid =

City Council of Valladolid Ayuntamiento de Valladolid

Type
- Type: Unicameral house of the Ayuntamiento of Valladolid

Leadership
- Mayor: Jesús Julio Carnero, PP since 28 May 2023
- Vice-Mayor: Irene Carvajal, Vox

Structure
- Political groups: Majority: PP (11); Vox (3); Minority: PSOE (11); VTLP (Note: Valladolid Toma la Palabra, an alliance between IU, Podemos, Verdes Equo, Alianza Verde and independents) (2)
- Length of term: 4 years

Elections
- Last election: 28 May 2023
- Next election: 23 May 2027

Meeting place
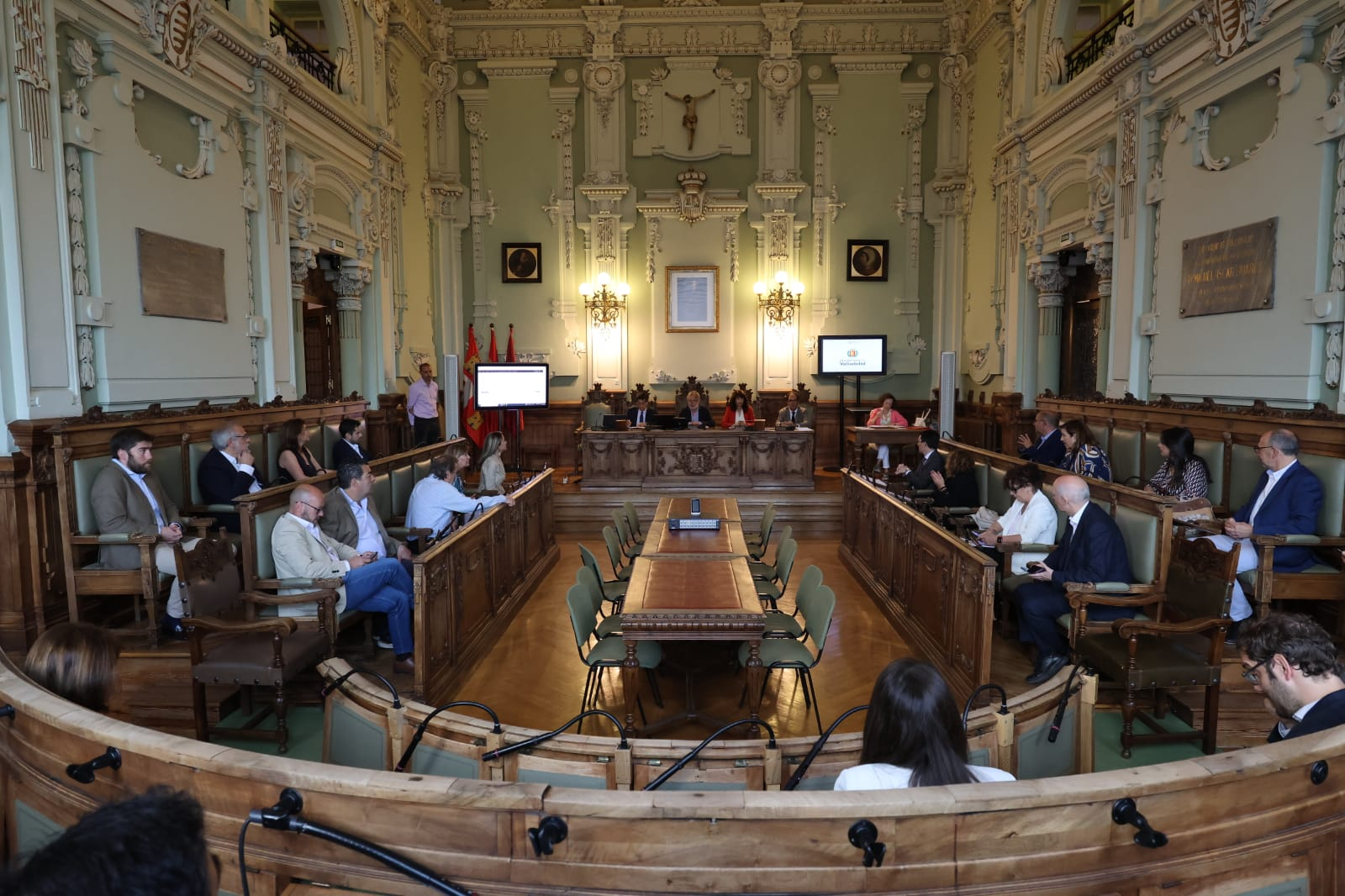
- Valladolid City Hall

The City Council of Valladolid (Spanish: Ayuntamiento de Valladolid) is the top-tier administrative and governing body (ayuntamiento) of the municipality of Valladolid, Spain.

== Organization ==
Its organization regime is based on the Law 7/1985, of April 2, regulatory of the Bases of the Local Regime. Integrated by the Mayor and the councillors, the ayuntamiento is charged with the government and administration of the municipality. The Mayor, who holds the highest representation of the city, directs politics government and administration and presides over the whole corporation as well as the plenary. The later is conformed by all the council members and it is tasked with adopting strategic decisions, overseeing the executive bodies and passing by-laws and regulations.

Mayor

The Mayor is elected by the members of the plenary among its members the day the new municipal corporation is formed after the local election, and has a mandate for the 4-year duration of the elected body. Since 13 June 2015 the Mayor is Óscar Puente.

== City hall ==
The Valladolid City Hall is located at the Plaza Mayor, 1, in the city centre. Its construction started in 1892. The building, a work of Repullés y Vargas, was inaugurated on 19 September 1908, although by that time the construction was not yet finished.

== See also ==
- Local government in Spain
