= Isabel Blanco (politician) =

Spanish politician (born 1972)

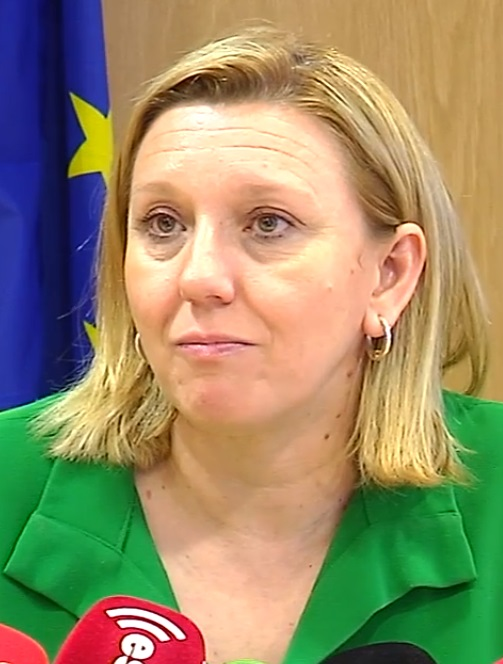
- Blanco in 2019

Vice President of Castile and León
- Incumbent
- Assumed office 12 July 2024
- President: Alfonso Fernández Mañueco
- Preceded by: Juan García-Gallardo

Personal details
- Born: 19 August 1972 (age 53)
- Party: People's Party

María Isabel Blanco Llamas (born 19 August 1972) is a Spanish politician serving as vice president of Castile and León since 2024. She has served as minister of family and equal opportunities of Castile and León since 2019. From May to July 2019, she was a member of the Congress of Deputies.
