= Carlos Fernández Carriedo =

Spanish politician (born 1963)

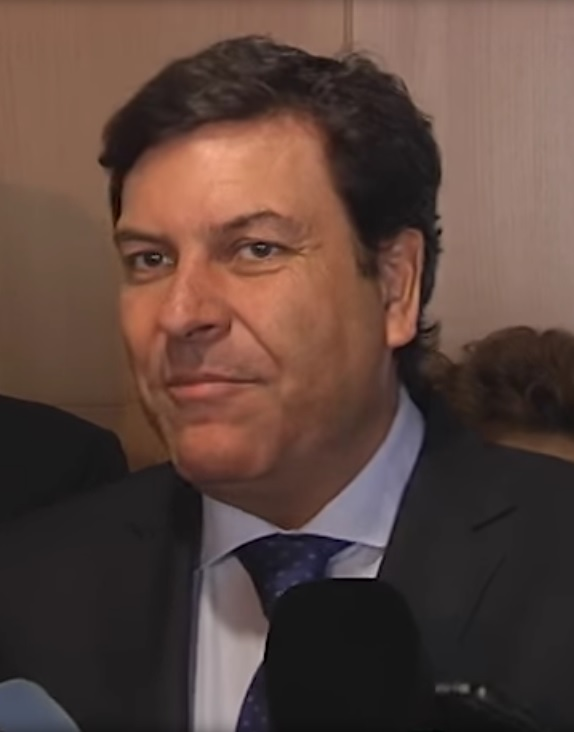
- Carlos Fernández

Minister of Economy and Finance
- Incumbent
- Assumed office 17 July 2019
- President: Alfonso Fernández Mañueco
- Preceded by: Pilar del Olmo

President of the People's Party
- In office 3 July 2007 – 13 September 2016
- President: Juan Vicente Herrera
- Preceded by: Rosa Valdeón
- Succeeded by: Juan José Sanz Vitorio

Procurator of the Cortes of Castile and León
- Incumbent
- Assumed office 17 June 2003

Personal details
- Born: Carlos Javier Amando Fernandez Carriedo; 1963 (age 62–63) Monzón de Campos, Palencia, Spain
- Party: People's Party
- Occupation: Politician; Economist; Civil servant

Carlos Fernández Carriedo (born 1963) is a Spanish politician, economist and civil servant. Jesús Julio is a member of the People's Party of Castile and León. He has been the spokesperson of popular group since 2007. Carlos Fernández is the Minister of Economy and finance of Castile and León, in office from 17 July 2019. He has been a Minister of Health and Social Welfare for the Junta de castilla and león from 1999 to 2003. Carlos Fernández was president of the popular party from 3 July 2007 to 13 September 2016.

== Biography ==
Carlos Fernández was born in Monzón de Campos, Spain. Carlos Fernández is married and has children. Carlos Fernández has been secretary of the public investment committee of castilla and león. Carlos Fernández has been secretary of the public investment committee of castilla and león. Carlos Fernández has held various positions of political responsibility, among which are the director general of budgets between 1995 and 1999. Carlos Fernández member of the working group on territorial economic incentives and head of the study service of the ministry of economy and finance.Carlos Fernández is current procurator of the Cortes of Castile and León.
