= Alfonso Fernández Mañueco =

Spanish politician (born 1965)

The Most Excellent Alfonso Fernández Mañueco
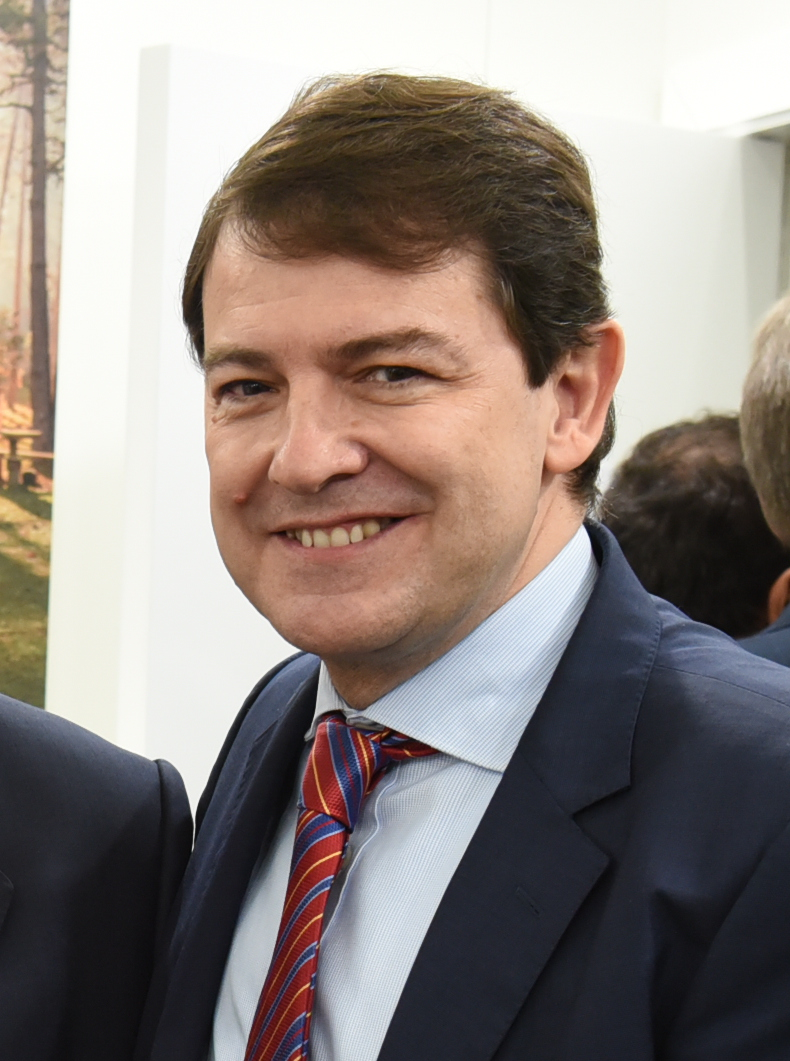

President of the Junta of Castile and León
- Incumbent
- Assumed office 11 July 2019
- Monarch: Felipe VI
- Vice President: Francisco Igea; Juan García-Gallardo; Isabel Blanco Llamas
- Preceded by: Juan Vicente Herrera

Mayor of Salamanca
- In office 11 June 2011 – 12 December 2018
- Preceded by: Julián Lanzarote
- Succeeded by: Carlos García Carbayo

President of the Provincial Deputation of Salamanca
- In office 1996–2001

Personal details
- Born: 29 April 1965 (age 60) Salamanca, Spain
- Party: People's Party

Alfonso Fernández Mañueco (born 29 April 1965) is a Spanish politician who has served as the President of the Junta of Castile and León since 2019. He is also the president of the People's Party of Castile and León since 2017. He served as mayor of Salamanca between 2011 and 2018.

== Biography ==
Born on 29 April 1965 in Salamanca, son of Marcelo Fernández Nieto (the Francoist mayor of Salamanca between 1969 and 1971) and Pilar Mañueco Bocos, he joined the New Generations of the People's Alliance (AP) in 1983. He graduated in Law at the University of Salamanca. He worked for two years as intern in a law firm. He was elected as member of the Salamanca Municipal Council in 1995, also becoming a member of the provincial deputation, serving as president of the later institution between 1996 and 2001. He moved then onto the regional government, serving as regional minister of Presidency and Interior and Justice of the Junta of Castile and León in the cabinets presided by Juan Vicente Herrera. He also became a member of the Cortes of Castile and León after the 2003 Castilian-Leonese regional election.

Fernández Mañueco was sworn in as mayor of Salamanca on 11 June 2011, after the 2011 municipal election.

He replaced Herrera as president of the People's Party of Castile and León in April 2017.

He effectively renounced to the office of mayor on 12 December 2018, in order to focus on his bid as PP's prospective challenger to the Presidency of the Government of Castile and León via the May 2019 regional election. At the regional election, the PP obtained 29 seats out of 81. After a coalition deal with Citizens, Fernández Mañueco was elected as President of the Junta of Castile and León with the support of 41 out of the 81 members of the Cortes of Castile and León. On 20 December 2021, he announced snap elections in Castile and León after expelling Citizens from the regional government.

== Honours ==
- Portugal: Grand Cross of the Order of Merit (15 April 2018)
