= Juan Carlos Suárez-Quiñones =

Spanish politician (born 1961)

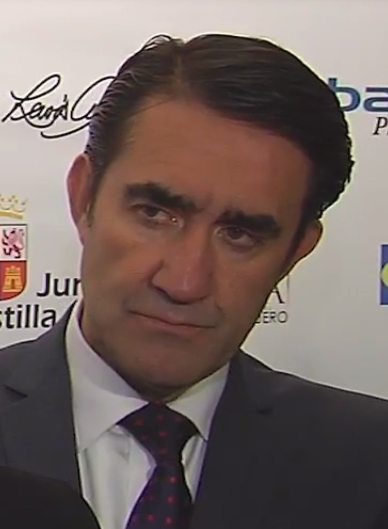
- Juan Carlos Suárez-Quiñones

Minister of Development and the Environment
- Incumbent
- Assumed office 17 July 2019

Personal details
- Born: 1961 (age 64–65) León, Spain
- Party: People's Party
- Education: University of León
- Occupation: Politician; Judge; Jurist

Juan Carlos Suárez-Quiñones (born 1961) is a Spanish politician, jurist and judge. Juan Carlos is the current minister of development and the environment of Cortes of Castile and León, in office from 17 July 2019.

== Career ==
Juan Carlos member of the judicial career by opposition overcome in 1987. He was promoted to magistrate in 1990. Juan Carlos elected judge dean of the courts of the judicial party of león from December 2002 to February 2012. Juan Carlos was appointed deputy representative of the government in león in 2012.

In the 2022 elections to the Castile and León Courts, he headed the list of the People's Party in the province of León.

== Personal life ==
Juan Carlos was born in León, Spain. Juan Carlos has been a member of various commissions and reflection groups of the ministry of justice. Juan Carlos was honored in 1999 by the decree mayor of the león at the police academy. Juan Carlos was studied at University of León.
