= Regional Government of Castile and León =

- Junta de Castilla y León

Overview
- Polity: Castile and León
- Leader: President
- Appointed by: King of Spain
- Responsible to: Cortes of Castile and León
- Headquarters: Valladolid
- Website: www.jcyl.es

The Regional Government of Castile and León (Spanish: Junta de Castilla y León; JCyL) is the governing and administrative body of the Spanish autonomous community of Castile and León and serves as the executive branch and regulatory authority. It comprises the President of the Junta, the vice-presidents and the ministers (consejeros). The function of the Junta is to govern and administer the autonomous community.

== The President and the seat of government ==
The President of the Council is the ultimate representative of the community. The president directs the actions of the Junta of Castile and León and plays a coordinating role among Council members. The seat of the presidency is at the School of the Assumption of Valladolid, whose original blueprints from 1902 are attributed to Santiago Guadilla. The President is chosen by the Cortes of Castile and León, can be removed by them if they lose the support of more than half of the representatives, and has the capacity to appoint and dismiss the ministers. The term of a president is tied to the legislature term length (the default legislative term is four years), and the president may be reelected without term limit.

== Presidents since inception (1983) ==
- Demetrio Madrid López (PSOE) (1983–86)
- José Constantino Nalda García (PSOE) (1986–1987)
- José María Aznar López (PP) (1987–89)
- Jesús María Posada Moreno (PP) (1989–91)
- Juan José Lucas Giménez (PP) (1991–2001)
- Juan Vicente Herrera Campo (PP) (2001–19)
- Alfonso Fernández Mañueco (PP) (2019–present)

In the pre-autonomous stage, the General Council of Castile and León (1978–83) was chaired by Juan Manuel Reol Tejada (UCD) during the period 1978–80 and by José Manuel García-Verdugo Candón (UCD) during the period 1981–83.

== Vice-presidents and ministers ==
The President can appoint and dismiss freely one or more vice-presidents. At the head of each ministry there is a minister, who is appointed freely by the President, and each one is subdivided into departments that coordinate and direct the administrative services. Some ministries include one or more vice ministers in their structure. In addition each ministry has a general secretary, various departments and even diverse autonomous branches and state-owned companies.

In Decree No. 2/2015, of 7 July, from the President of the Junta of Castile and León, regarding restructuring of the ministries, the current organizational structure of the Board of Castile and León is defined.

The current council and its ministers (Spanish: consejeros) are:

Junta of Castile and León 2015–2019
President of the Junta of Castile and León: Juan Vicente Herrera Campo
Vice-president and spokesperson: Rosa María Valdeón Santiago
| Ministry | Minister |
| Ministry of the Presidency | José Antonio de Santiago-Juárez López |
| Ministry of the Economy and Internal Revenue | Pilar del Olmo Moro |
| Ministry of Employment | Rosa María Valdeón Santiago |
| Ministry of Development and the Environment | Juan Carlos Suárez-Quiñones Fernández |
| Ministry of Agriculture and Livestock | Milagros Marcos Ortega |
| Ministry of Health | Antonio María Sáez Aguado |
| Ministry of Family and Equal Opportunity | Alicia García Rodríguez |
| Ministry of Education | Fernando Rey Martínez |
| Ministry of Culture and Tourism | María Josefa García Cirac |
BOCyL No. 130 of 8 July 2015

== Transferred responsibilities ==
(From the central government to the community)

- Health
- Universities
- Education (non university)
- Agriculture
- Employment
- Social services

== Advisory board ==
This is the supreme advisory organism of the Government of the Council. Its decisions are not binding, that is to say, the Council is not obliged to follow its opinions.

It is composed by five members, three elected by the Courts and two by the Council.

Its headquarters is in the city of Zamora.

== See also ==
- Castile and León
- Cortes of Castile and León
- President of the Junta of Castile and León
