= 1991 Castilian-Leonese regional election =

Election in the Spanish region of Castile and León

- 26 May 1991

All 84 seats in the Cortes of Castile and León 43 seats needed for a majority
- Opinion polls
- Registered: 2,069,469 ▲3.6%
- Turnout: 1,398,238 (67.6%) ▼5.6 pp
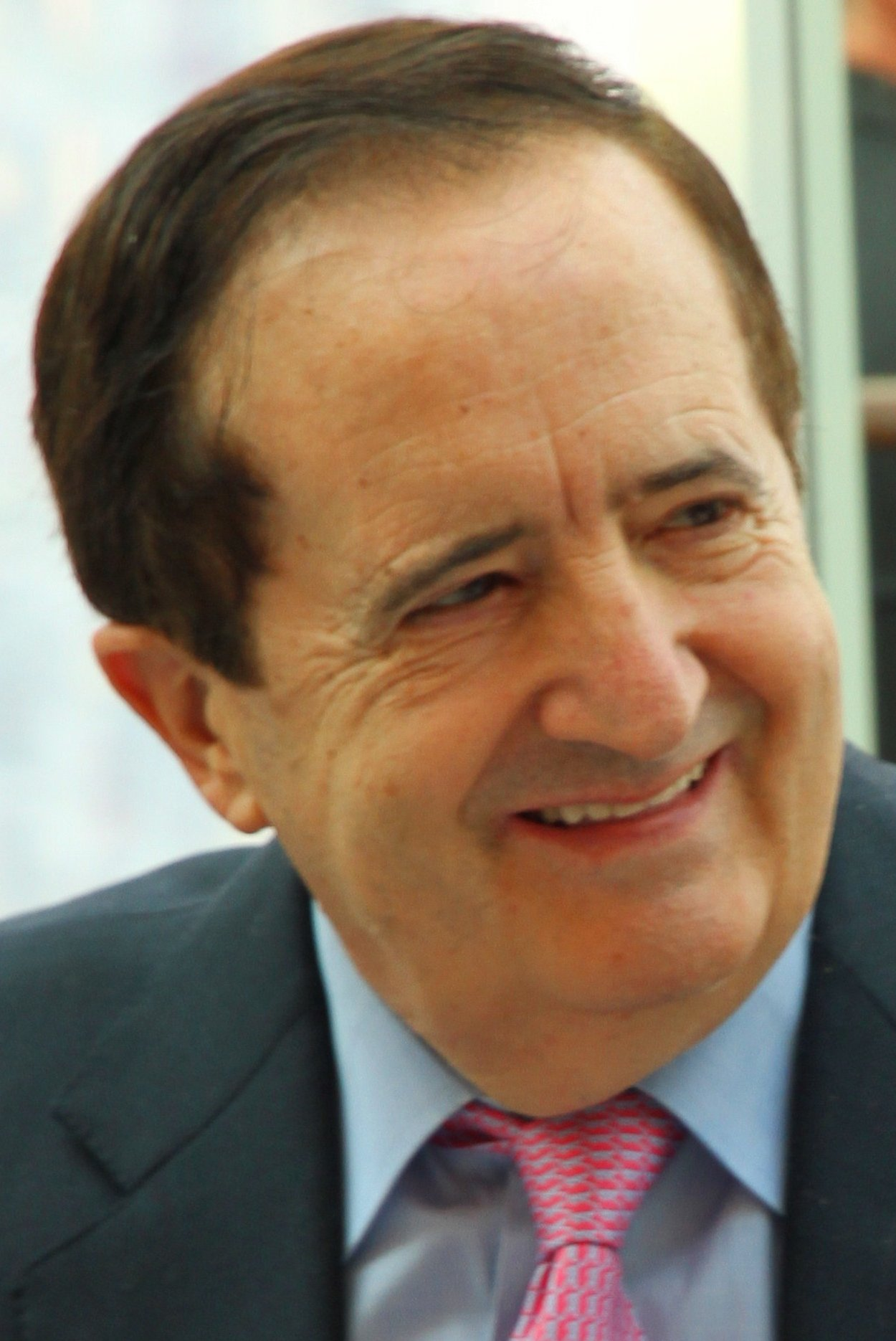

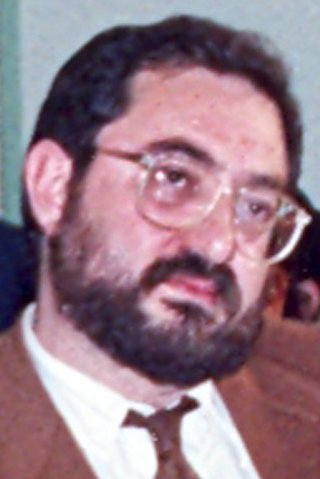

	First party	Second party	Third party
Leader	Juan José Lucas	Jesús Quijano	José Luis Sagredo
Party	PP	PSOE	CDS
Leader since	14 January 1991	26 May 1990	1991
Leader's seat	Valladolid	Valladolid	Salamanca
Last election	34 seats, 38.3% (Note: Results for AP (34.4%, 32 seats), PDP (2.4%, 1 seat), SI (1.3%, 1 seat) and PL (0.2%, 0 seats) in the 1987 election.)	32 seats, 34.0%	18 seats, 19.4%
Seats won	43	35	5
Seat change	▲9	▲3	▼13
Popular vote	602,773	504,709	112,821
Percentage	43.5%	36.4%	8.1%
Swing	▲5.2 pp	▲2.4 pp	▼11.3 pp
	Fourth party
Leader	Antonio Herreros
Party	IU
Leader since	1991
Last election	0 seats, 3.8%
Seats won	1
Seat change	▲1
Popular vote	74,197
Percentage	5.4%
Swing	▲1.6 pp
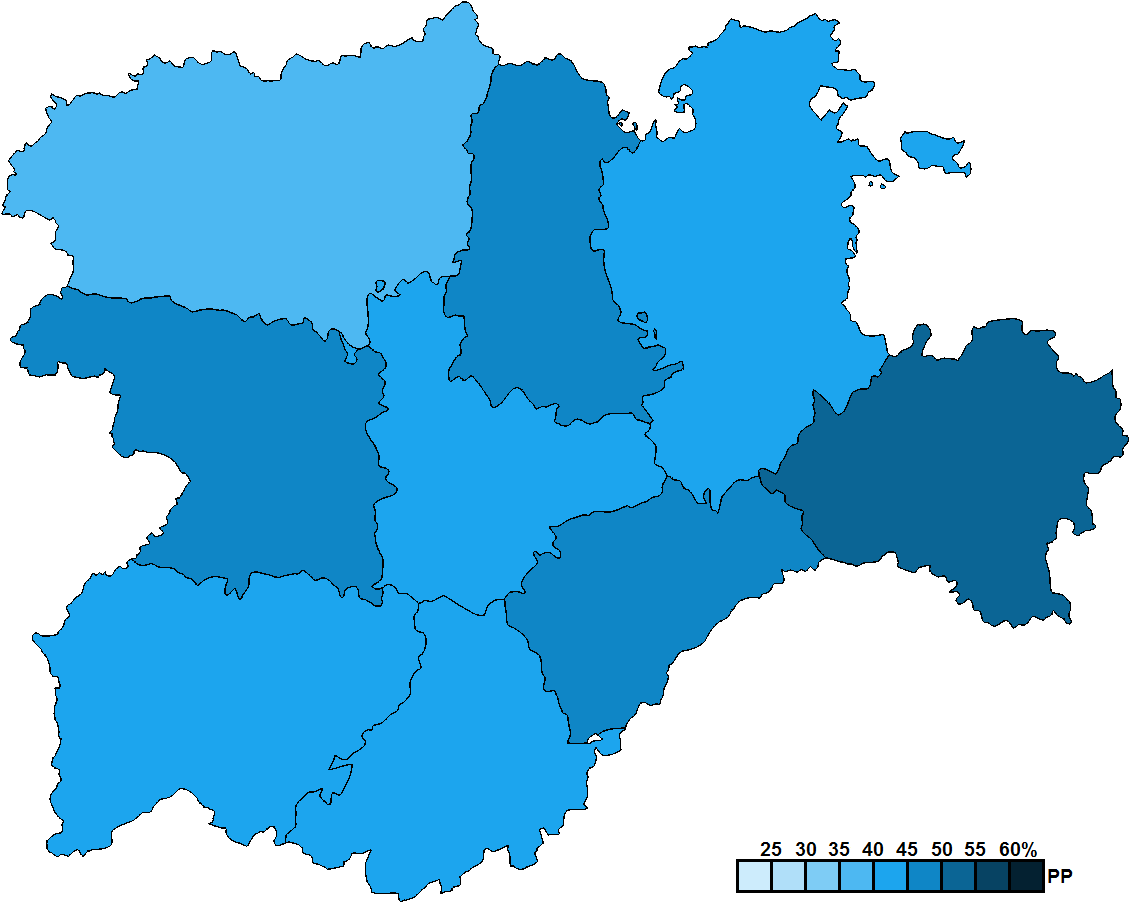
- Constituency results map for the Cortes of Castile and León
President before election
Jesús Posada
PP
President after election
Juan José Lucas
PP

A regional election was held in Castile and León on 26 May 1991 to elect the 3rd Cortes of the autonomous community. All 84 seats in the Cortes were up for election. It was held concurrently with regional elections in twelve other autonomous communities and local elections all across Spain.

The preceding legislature had seen José María Aznar forming a minority government of People's Alliance (AP) in 1987 through the abstention of the Democratic and Social Centre (CDS) and the support of the People's Democratic Party (PDP) and the Independent Solution (SI) of Burgos mayor José María Peña San Martín. In May 1989, following AP's re-foundation into the People's Party (PP) earlier that year, the CDS joined the cabinet as a coalition partner, granting the regional government an overall majority in the Cortes. In September 1989, Aznar resigned in order to become the PP's leading candidate for the 29 October general election—and eventually, PP national president in April 1990—, with the regional presidency being granted to Jesús Posada. However, Posada renounced contesting the party's candidacy for re-election in January 1991, following Aznar's decision to pick Juan José Lucas as regional candidate instead.

The election saw the PP secure its first absolute majority in the region, virtually ensuring the election of Lucas to the regional presidency. The CDS, on the other hand, saw its support collapse from 18 to 5 seats, with the PP's majority leaving the party out of government. The opposition Spanish Socialist Workers' Party (PSOE) slightly increased its vote share and seat count compared to its 1987 result, whereas United Left (IU) entered the Cortes for the first time with one seat.

== Overview ==
Under the 1983 Statute of Autonomy, the Cortes of Castile and León was the unicameral legislature of the homonymous autonomous community, having legislative power in devolved matters, as well as the ability to grant or withdraw confidence from a regional president. The electoral and procedural rules were supplemented by national law provisions.

=== Date ===
The term of the Cortes of Castile and León expired four years after the date of its previous ordinary election, with amendments earlier in 1991 fixing election day for the fourth Sunday of May every four years. The election decree was required to be issued between 54 and 60 days before the scheduled election date and published on the following day in the Official Gazette of Castile and León (BOCYL). The previous election was held on 10 June 1987, setting the date for election day on the fourth Sunday of May four years later, which was 26 May 1991.

The Cortes of Castile and León could not be dissolved before the expiration date of parliament, except in the event of an investiture process failing to elect a regional president within a two-month period from the first ballot. In such a case—provided this did not happen during the last year of parliament before its planned expiration—the Cortes were to be automatically dissolved and a snap election called, with elected lawmakers serving the remainder of its original four-year term.

The election to the Cortes of Castile and León was officially called on 2 April 1991 with the publication of the corresponding decree in the BOCYL, setting election day for 26 May and scheduling for the chamber to reconvene on 21 June.

=== Electoral system ===
Voting for the Cortes was based on universal suffrage, comprising all Spanish nationals over 18 years of age, registered in Castile and León and with full political rights, provided that they had not been deprived of the right to vote by a final sentence, nor were legally incapacitated.

The Cortes of Castile and León had three seats per each multi-member constituency—corresponding to the provinces of Ávila, Burgos, León, Palencia, Salamanca, Segovia, Soria, Valladolid and Zamora—plus one additional seat per 45,000 inhabitants or fraction above 22,500. All were elected using the D'Hondt method and closed-list proportional voting, with a three percent-threshold of valid votes (including blank ballots) in each constituency. The use of this electoral method resulted in a higher effective threshold depending on district magnitude and vote distribution.

As a result of the aforementioned allocation, each Cortes constituency was entitled the following seats:

Seats	Constituencies
15	León
14	Valladolid
11	Burgos, Salamanca
8	Zamora
7	Ávila, Palencia
6	Segovia
5	Soria

The law did not provide for by-elections to fill vacant seats; instead, any vacancies arising after the proclamation of candidates and during the legislative term were filled by the next candidates on the party lists or, when required, by designated substitutes.

=== Outgoing parliament ===
The table below shows the composition of the parliamentary groups in the chamber at the time of the election call.

Parliamentary composition in April 1991
Groups	Parties	Legislators	
Groups	Parties	Seats	Total
People's Parliamentary Group	PP	33	33
Socialist Parliamentary Group	PSOE	31	31
Democratic and Social Centre's Parliamentary Group	CDS	18	18
Mixed Parliamentary Group	INDEP	2 (Note: Pascual Sánchez, former PSOE legislator; José Antonio Martín, former CDS legislator.)	2

== Parties and candidates ==
The electoral law allowed for parties and federations registered in the interior ministry, alliances and groupings of electors to present lists of candidates. Parties and federations intending to form an alliance were required to inform the relevant electoral commission within 10 days of the election call, whereas groupings of electors needed to secure the signature of at least one percent of the electorate in the constituencies for which they sought election, disallowing electors from signing for more than one list.

Below is a list of the main parties and alliances which contested the election:

Candidacy	Parties and alliances	Leading candidate	Ideology	Previous result		Gov.	Ref.
Candidacy	Parties and alliances	Leading candidate	Ideology	Vote %	Seats	Gov.	Ref.
PP	List: People's Party (PP)	Juan José Lucas	Conservatism; Christian democracy	38.3%	34	Yes	
PSOE	List: Spanish Socialist Workers' Party (PSOE)	Jesús Quijano	Social democracy	34.0%	32	No	
CDS	List: Democratic and Social Centre (CDS)	José Luis Sagredo	Centrism; Liberalism	19.4%	18	Yes	
IU	List: Communist Party of Castile and León (PCCyL); Socialist Action Party (PASOC); Republican Left (IR)	Antonio Herreros	Socialism; Communism	3.8%	0	No	

== Opinion polls ==
The tables below list opinion polling results in reverse chronological order, showing the most recent first and using the dates when the survey fieldwork was done, as opposed to the date of publication. Where the fieldwork dates are unknown, the date of publication is given instead. The highest percentage figure in each polling survey is displayed with its background shaded in the leading party's colour. If a tie ensues, this is applied to the figures with the highest percentages. The "Lead" column on the right shows the percentage-point difference between the parties with the highest percentages in a poll.

=== Voting intention estimates ===
The table below lists weighted voting intention estimates. Refusals are generally excluded from the party vote percentages, while question wording and the treatment of "don't know" responses and those not intending to vote may vary between polling organisations. When available, seat projections determined by the polling organisations are displayed below (or in place of) the percentages in a smaller font; 43 seats were required for an absolute majority in the Cortes of Castile and León.

Polling firm/Commissioner	Fieldwork date	Sample size	Turnout	AP	PSOE	CDS	IU	PDP	SI	PP	Lead
1991 regional election	26 May 1991	—N/a	67.6	(Note: Within PP.)	36.4; 35	8.1; 5	5.4; 1			43.5; 43	7.1
Sigma Dos/El Mundo	18 May 1991	?	?		35.2; 32/34	9.3; 6/7	6.8; 1/3			42.8; 42/43	7.6
Metra Seis/El Independiente	12 May 1991	?	?		34.2; 33/34	11.6; 8/9	5.7; 1			39.4; 40	5.2
Demoscopia/El País	4–7 May 1991	1,450	?		32.2; 28/33	7.2; 2/4	7.7; 3/4			46.6; 43/47	14.4
1989 general election	29 Oct 1989	—N/a	73.3		35.6 (34)	12.8 (8)	6.7 (3)			40.2 (39)	4.6
1989 EP election	15 Jun 1989	—N/a	57.5		36.4 (37)	13.2 (12)	4.0 (1)			32.3 (34)	4.1
1987 regional election	10 Jun 1987	—N/a	73.2	34.4; 32	34.0; 32	19.4; 18	3.8; 0	2.4; 1	1.3; 1	–	0.4

=== Voting preferences ===
The table below lists raw, unweighted voting preferences.

Polling firm/Commissioner	Fieldwork date	Sample size	AP	PSOE	CDS	IU	PDP	SI	PP	Question	X mark	Lead
1991 regional election (Note: Does not include non-resident citizens.)	26 May 1991	—N/a		24.3	5.5	3.6			29.1	—N/a	31.9	4.8
ICP–Research/Diario 16	19 May 1991	?		33.3	9.0	4.5			28.6	–	–	4.7
CIS	13–25 Mar 1991	4,529		23.0	4.0	4.0			23.0	40.0	5.0	Tie
CIS	2–19 Feb 1991	5,979		25.5	4.3	3.5			22.2	33.5	9.8	3.3
1989 general election	29 Oct 1989	—N/a		25.8	9.3	4.8			29.3	—N/a	26.4	3.5
1989 EP election	15 Jun 1989	—N/a		20.7	7.5	2.3			18.4	—N/a	42.3	2.3
CIS	15–26 Oct 1988	4,794	23.1	20.3	10.0	2.2	0.2	–	–	35.0	8.8	2.8
1987 regional election	10 Jun 1987	—N/a	24.7	24.5	13.9	2.7	1.8	1.0	–	—N/a	26.8	0.2

=== Victory preferences ===
The table below lists opinion polling on the victory preferences for each party in the event of a regional election taking place.

Polling firm/Commissioner	Fieldwork date	Sample size	PSOE	CDS	IU	PP	Other/ None	Question	Lead
CIS	13–25 Mar 1991	4,529	30.0	4.0	5.0	28.0	9.0	25.0	2.0
CIS	2–19 Feb 1991	5,979	29.6	5.0	4.0	25.4	9.6	26.4	4.2

== Results ==
=== Overall ===
← Summary of the 26 May 1991 Cortes of Castile and León election results →
Parties and alliances	Popular vote			Seats	
Parties and alliances	Votes	%	±pp	Total	+/−
People's Party (PP)^{1}	602,773	43.52	+5.23	43	+9
Spanish Socialist Workers' Party (PSOE)	504,709	36.44	+2.43	35	+3
Democratic and Social Centre (CDS)	112,821	8.14	−11.23	5	−13
United Left (IU)	74,197	5.36	+1.55	1	+1
The Greens (LV)	20,193	1.46	New	0	±0
Leonese People's Union (UPL)	11,432	0.83	+0.21	0	±0
Burgalese Popular Action (APB)	6,493	0.47	New	0	±0
Regionalist Democracy of Castile and León (DRCL)	4,587	0.33	New	0	±0
Party of El Bierzo (PB)	4,465	0.32	−0.06	0	±0
Bercian Left (IB)	3,407	0.25	New	0	±0
Castilian Regionalist Party (PREC)	3,042	0.22	New	0	±0
Castilianist Union (UC)	2,229	0.16	New	0	±0
Independent Progressive Union (UPI)	2,127	0.15	New	0	±0
Regionalist Party of the Leonese Country (PREPAL)	2,123	0.15	−0.13	0	±0
Commoners' Land (TC)	1,900	0.14	New	0	±0
The Greens Ecologist–Humanist List (LVLE–H)^{2}	1,622	0.12	−0.15	0	±0
Palentine Unity (UP)	1,558	0.11	New	0	±0
Spanish Phalanx of the CNSO (FE–JONS)	895	0.06	−0.07	0	±0
Communist Party of the Peoples of Spain (PCPE)	873	0.06	New	0	±0
Left Unitary Platform (PCE (m–l)–CRPE)	435	0.03	New	0	±0
Nationalist Party of Castile and León (PANCAL)	298	0.02	−0.34	0	±0
Blank ballots	23,028	1.66	+0.08		
Total	1,385,207			84	±0
Valid votes	1,385,207	99.07	+0.79		
Invalid votes	13,031	0.93	−0.79		
Votes cast / turnout	1,398,238	67.57	−5.58		
Abstentions	671,231	32.43	+5.58		
Registered voters	2,069,469				
Sources
Footnotes: ^{1} People's Party results are compared to the combined totals of People's Alliance, People's Democratic Party, Independent Solution and Liberal Party in the 1987 election.; ^{2} The Greens Ecologist–Humanist List results are compared to Humanist Platform totals in the 1987 election.

Popular vote
PP	43.52%
PSOE	36.44%
CDS	8.14%
IU	5.36%
LV	1.46%
Others	3.43%
Blank ballots	1.66%

Seats
PP	51.19%
PSOE	41.67%
CDS	5.95%
IU	1.19%

=== Distribution by constituency ===
Constituency	PP		PSOE		CDS		IU	
Constituency	%	S	%	S	%	S	%	S
Ávila	42.3	3	26.3	2	24.8	2	3.6	−
Burgos	44.0	6	34.0	5	5.8	−	6.6	−
León	39.8	7	38.9	7	5.5	1	4.9	−
Palencia	45.3	4	37.2	3	6.7	−	5.3	−
Salamanca	44.5	5	39.5	5	7.8	1	4.0	−
Segovia	46.1	4	32.4	2	11.0	−	5.8	−
Soria	52.3	3	33.9	2	6.4	−	2.7	−
Valladolid	42.6	7	38.4	6	5.2	−	8.2	1
Zamora	45.4	4	37.6	3	9.9	1	3.4	−
Total	43.5	43	36.4	35	8.1	5	5.4	1

== Aftermath ==
=== Government formation ===
Investiture; Nomination of Juan José Lucas (PP)
Ballot →	4 July 1991
Required majority →	43 out of 84
Yes: • PP (43)	43 / 84
No: • PSOE (34); • CDS (5); • IU (1)	40 / 84
Abstentions	0 / 84
Absentees: • PSOE (1)	1 / 84

== Bibliography ==
- Ley Orgánica 4/1983, de 25 de febrero, de Estatuto de Autonomía de Castilla-León (Organic Law 4/1983). Official State Gazette (in Spanish). 25 February 1983. BOE-A-1983-6483.
- Ley Orgánica 5/1985, de 19 de junio, del Régimen Electoral General (Organic Law 5/1985). Official State Gazette (in Spanish). 19 June 1985 [version as of 14 March 1991]. BOE-A-1985-11672.
- Ley 3/1987, de 30 de marzo, Electoral de Castilla y León (Law 3/1987). Official State Gazette (in Spanish). 30 March 1987 [version as of 26 March 1991]. BOE-A-1987-9475.
- Decreto 60/1991 de 1 de abril, por el que se convocan elecciones a las Cortes de Castilla y León (PDF) (Decree 60/1991). Official Gazette of Castile and León (in Spanish). 1 April 1991. BOCYL-D-02041991-2.
