= Francisco Vázquez Requero =

Francisco Javier Vázquez Requero (born 10 June 1959) is a Spanish politician of the People's Party (PP). He was a member of the Cortes of Castile and León from 1995 to 2004 and again from 2019, and was named president (speaker) of the legislature from 2026.

== Biography ==
Born in Segovia, Vázquez graduated with a law degree from the Complutense University of Madrid. He was a lawyer with the Segovia Bar Association and a senior civil servant in Castile and León. He was part of the torch relay for the 1992 Summer Olympics in Barcelona.

Vázquez was a member of the Cortes of Castile and León from 1995 to 2004, and the spokesman of the People's Party group within it from 2001 to 2003. From 2004 to 2011 he sat in the Senate of Spain, and from 2003 to 2019 he was a member of the council in his hometown; for the last eight years of that period he was the president of the provincial deputation.

For the 2019 Castilian-Leonese regional election, Vázquez was chosen as the PP's lead candidate in the Segovia constituency. His party formed government alongside Citizens (Cs), and Luis Fuentes of that party was named president of the Cortes of Castile and León, the roles of speaker, with Vázquez as vice president. After the 2022 election, the PP formed government with Vox whose Carlos Pollán was appointed president of the Cortes while Vázquez remained vice president. On 14 April 2026, following an election, the PP and Vox formed government again and Vázquez was named president of the Cortes, the first from his party in seven years.
