= 1995 Castilian-Leonese regional election =

Election in the Spanish region of Castile and León

- 28 May 1995

All 84 seats in the Cortes of Castile and León 43 seats needed for a majority
- Opinion polls
- Registered: 2,119,498 ▲2.4%
- Turnout: 1,556,975 (73.5%) ▲5.9 pp
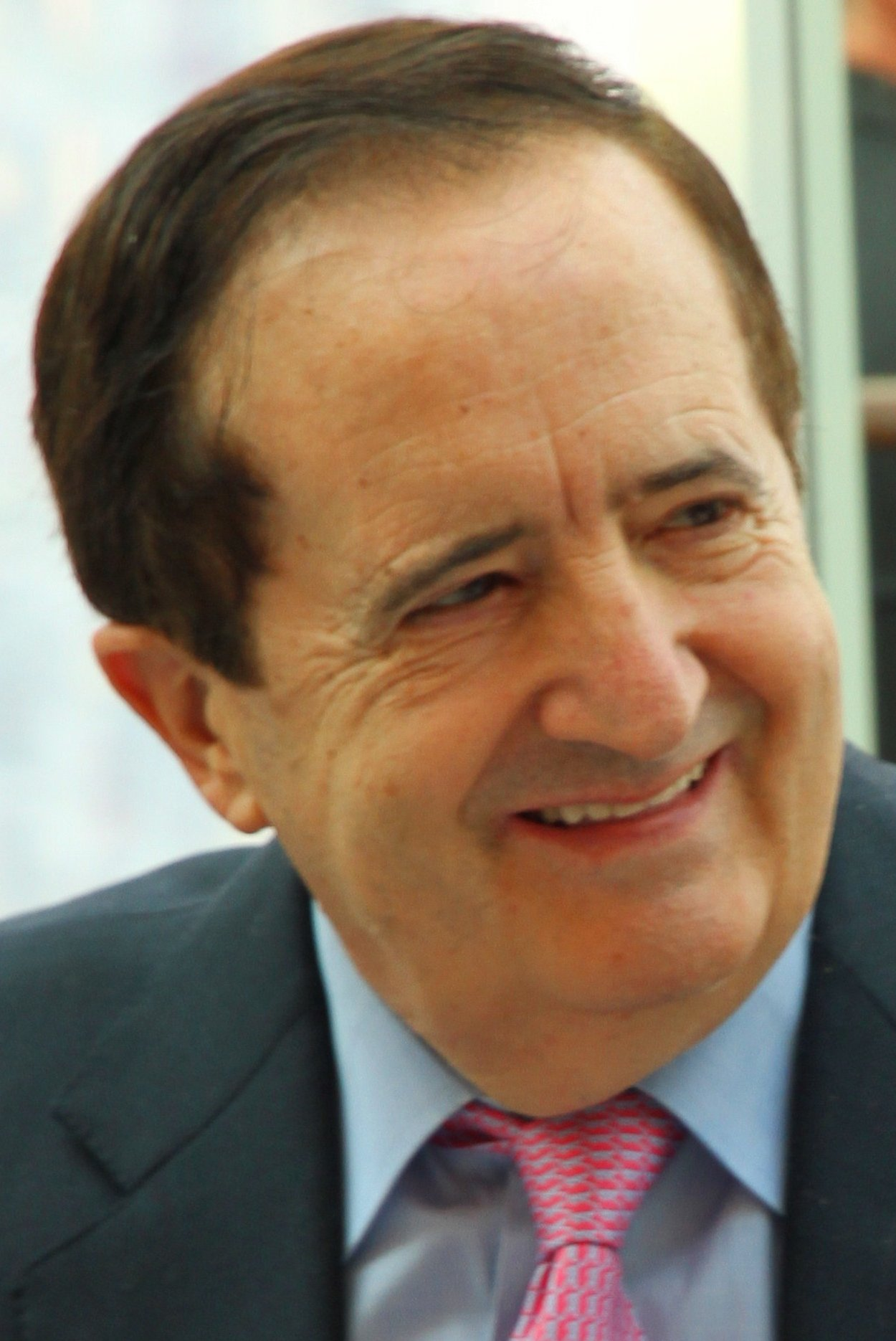

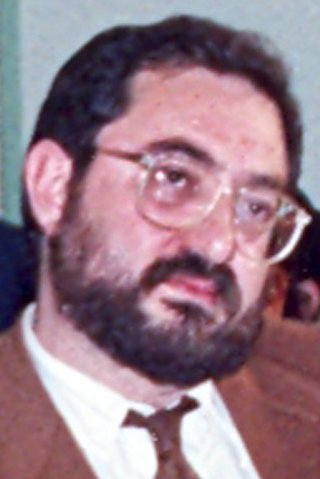

	First party	Second party	Third party
Leader	Juan José Lucas	Jesús Quijano	Antonio Herreros
Party	PP	PSOE	IU
Leader since	14 January 1991	26 May 1990	1991
Leader's seat	Valladolid	Valladolid	Valladolid
Last election	43 seats, 43.5%	35 seats, 36.4%	1 seat, 5.4%
Seats won	50	27	5
Seat change	▲7	▼8	▲4
Popular vote	805,553	458,447	147,777
Percentage	52.2%	29.7%	9.6%
Swing	▲8.7 pp	▼6.7 pp	▲4.2 pp
	Fourth party
Leader	Conchi Farto
Party	UPL
Leader since	1995
Leader's seat	León
Last election	0 seats, 0.8%
Seats won	2
Seat change	▲2
Popular vote	39,425
Percentage	2.6%
Swing	▲1.8 pp
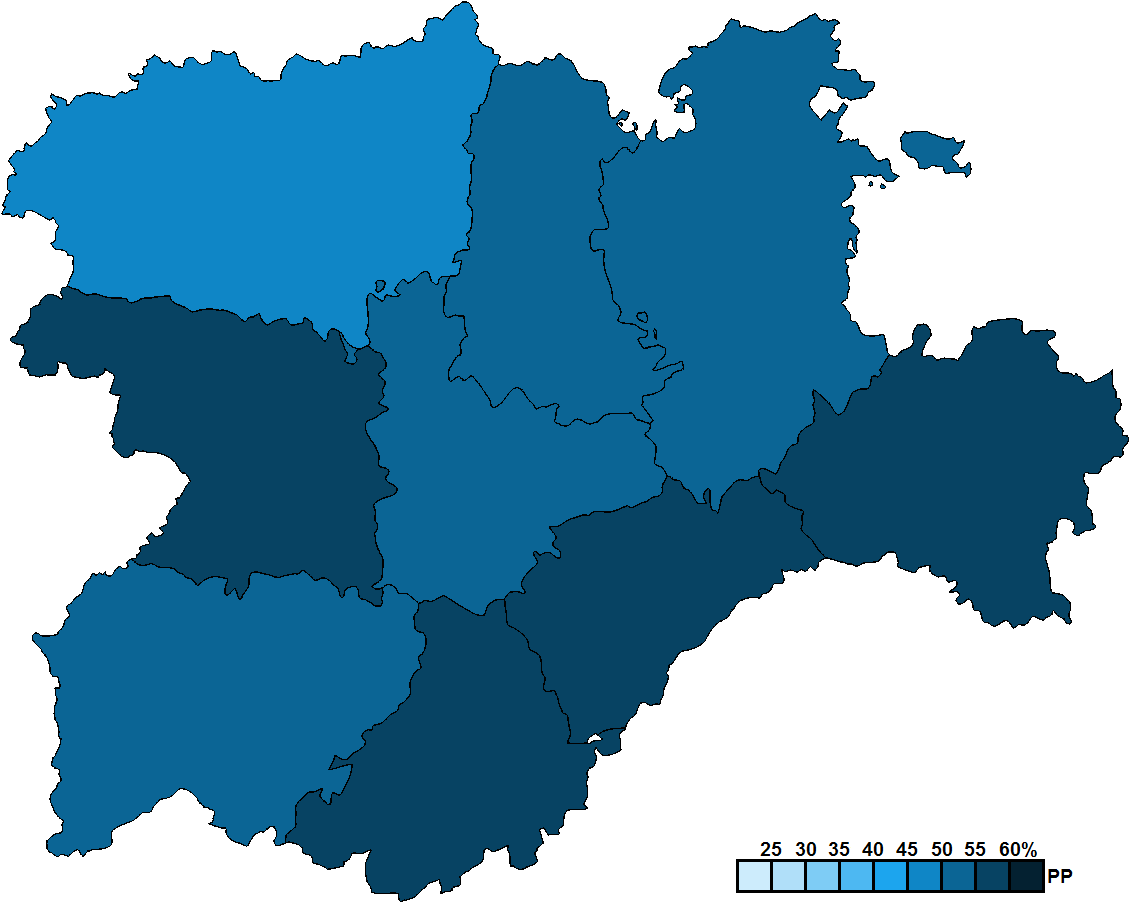
- Constituency results map for the Cortes of Castile and León
President before election
Juan José Lucas
PP
President after election
Juan José Lucas
PP

A regional election was held in Castile and León on 28 May 1995 to elect the 4th Cortes of the autonomous community. All 84 seats in the Cortes were up for election. It was held concurrently with regional elections in twelve other autonomous communities and local elections all across Spain.

== Overview ==
Under the 1983 Statute of Autonomy, the Cortes of Castile and León was the unicameral legislature of the homonymous autonomous community, having legislative power in devolved matters, as well as the ability to grant or withdraw confidence from a regional president. The electoral and procedural rules were supplemented by national law provisions.

=== Date ===
The term of the Cortes of Castile and León expired four years after the date of its previous ordinary election, with election day being fixed for the fourth Sunday of May every four years. The election decree was required to be issued no later than 25 days before the scheduled expiration date of parliament and published on the following day in the Official Gazette of Castile and León (BOCYL). The previous election was held on 26 May 1991, setting the date for election day on the fourth Sunday of May four years later, which was 28 May 1995.

The Cortes of Castile and León could not be dissolved before the expiration date of parliament, except in the event of an investiture process failing to elect a regional president within a two-month period from the first ballot. In such a case—provided this did not happen during the last year of parliament before its planned expiration—the Cortes were to be automatically dissolved and a snap election called, with elected lawmakers serving the remainder of its original four-year term.

The election to the Cortes of Castile and León was officially called on 4 April 1995 with the publication of the corresponding decree in the BOCYL, setting election day for 28 May and scheduling for the chamber to reconvene on 21 June.

=== Electoral system ===
Voting for the Cortes was based on universal suffrage, comprising all Spanish nationals over 18 years of age, registered in Castile and León and with full political rights, provided that they had not been deprived of the right to vote by a final sentence, nor were legally incapacitated.

The Cortes of Castile and León had three seats per each multi-member constituency—corresponding to the provinces of Ávila, Burgos, León, Palencia, Salamanca, Segovia, Soria, Valladolid and Zamora—plus one additional seat per 45,000 inhabitants or fraction above 22,500. All were elected using the D'Hondt method and closed-list proportional voting, with a three percent-threshold of valid votes (including blank ballots) in each constituency. The use of this electoral method resulted in a higher effective threshold depending on district magnitude and vote distribution.

As a result of the aforementioned allocation, each Cortes constituency was entitled the following seats:

Seats	Constituencies
15	León
14	Valladolid
11	Burgos, Salamanca
8	Zamora
7	Ávila, Palencia
6	Segovia
5	Soria

The law did not provide for by-elections to fill vacant seats; instead, any vacancies arising after the proclamation of candidates and during the legislative term were filled by the next candidates on the party lists or, when required, by designated substitutes.

=== Outgoing parliament ===
The table below shows the composition of the parliamentary groups in the chamber at the time of the election call.

Parliamentary composition in April 1995
Groups	Parties	Legislators	
Groups	Parties	Seats	Total
People's Parliamentary Group	PP	45	45
Socialist Parliamentary Group	PSOE	34	34
Democratic and Social Centre's Parliamentary Group	CDS	3	3
Mixed Parliamentary Group	IU	1	2
Mixed Parliamentary Group	INDEP	1 (Note: Virgilio Buiza, former PSOE legislator.)	2

== Parties and candidates ==
The electoral law allowed for parties and federations registered in the interior ministry, alliances and groupings of electors to present lists of candidates. Parties and federations intending to form an alliance were required to inform the relevant electoral commission within 10 days of the election call, whereas groupings of electors needed to secure the signature of at least one percent of the electorate in the constituencies for which they sought election, disallowing electors from signing for more than one list.

Below is a list of the main parties and alliances which contested the election:

Candidacy	Parties and alliances	Leading candidate	Ideology	Previous result		Gov.	Ref.
Candidacy	Parties and alliances	Leading candidate	Ideology	Vote %	Seats	Gov.	Ref.
PP	List: People's Party (PP)	Juan José Lucas	Conservatism; Christian democracy	43.5%	43	Yes	
PSOE	List: Spanish Socialist Workers' Party (PSOE)	Jesús Quijano	Social democracy	36.4%	35	No	
IU	List: United Left of Castile and León (IU) – Communist Party of Castile and León (PCCyL) – Socialist Action Party (PASOC) – Republican Left (IR)	Antonio Herreros	Socialism; Communism	5.4%	1	No	
UPL	List: Leonese People's Union (UPL)	Conchi Farto	Leonesism; Regionalism; Autonomism	0.8%	0	No	

== Campaign ==
=== Debates ===
1995 Castilian-Leonese regional election debates
Date	Organizer(s)	Moderator(s)	P Present (Note: Denotes a main invitee attending the event.) S Surrogate (Note: Denotes a main invitee not attending the event, sending a surrogate in their place.) NI Not invited A Absent invitee				
Date	Organizer(s)	Moderator(s)	PP	PSOE	IU	Audience	Ref.
17 May	Club de Opinión; Libertad y Progreso	Jesús Fonseca	P Lucas	P Quijano	P Herreros	—	

== Opinion polls ==
The tables below list opinion polling results in reverse chronological order, showing the most recent first and using the dates when the survey fieldwork was done, as opposed to the date of publication. Where the fieldwork dates are unknown, the date of publication is given instead. The highest percentage figure in each polling survey is displayed with its background shaded in the leading party's colour. If a tie ensues, this is applied to the figures with the highest percentages. The "Lead" column on the right shows the percentage-point difference between the parties with the highest percentages in a poll.

=== Voting intention estimates ===
The table below lists weighted voting intention estimates. Refusals are generally excluded from the party vote percentages, while question wording and the treatment of "don't know" responses and those not intending to vote may vary between polling organisations. When available, seat projections determined by the polling organisations are displayed below (or in place of) the percentages in a smaller font; 43 seats were required for an absolute majority in the Cortes of Castile and León.

Color key:

Exit poll

Polling firm/Commissioner	Fieldwork date	Sample size	Turnout	PP	PSOE	CDS	IU	UPL	Lead
1995 regional election	28 May 1995	—N/a	73.5	52.2; 50	29.7; 27	–	9.6; 5	2.6; 2	22.5
Eco Consulting/RTVE	28 May 1995	?	?	51.9; 49/53	28.6; 24/27	–	10.5; 5/6	? 1/2	23.3
Vox Pública–ODEC/Antena 3	28 May 1995	?	?	? 43/47	? 23/27	–	–	–	?
Demoscopia/El País	10–15 May 1995	1,600	?	54.0; 54/55	27.1; 21/22	2.1; 0	10.9; 7/9	–	26.9
CIS	26 Apr–11 May 1995	3,001	64.8	57.6	28.2	1.3	9.2	–	29.4
1994 EP election	12 Jun 1994	—N/a	62.0	53.7 (54)	28.8 (25)	1.8 (0)	11.0 (5)	–	24.9
Sigma Dos/Ical	15 Dec 1993	?	?	51.8; 47/50	32.1; 29/32	1.5; 0	10.1; 5	–	19.7
1993 general election	6 Jun 1993	—N/a	78.3	47.4 (46)	36.7 (34)	4.1 (1)	7.7 (3)	0.8 (0)	10.7
1991 regional election	26 May 1991	—N/a	67.6	43.5; 43	36.4; 35	8.1; 5	5.4; 1	0.8; 0	7.1

=== Voting preferences ===
The table below lists raw, unweighted voting preferences.

Polling firm/Commissioner	Fieldwork date	Sample size	PP	PSOE	CDS	IU	UPL	Question	X mark	Lead
1995 regional election (Note: Does not include non-resident citizens.)	28 May 1995	—N/a	37.9	21.4	–	7.0	1.9	—N/a	25.6	16.5
CIS	26 Apr–11 May 1995	3,001	40.7	19.9	0.3	6.0	–	23.5	6.2	20.8
CIS	2–17 Mar 1995	2,997	35.6	16.1	1.0	7.7	–	28.2	7.5	19.5
1994 EP election	12 Jun 1994	—N/a	33.6	17.9	1.1	6.9	–	—N/a	37.4	15.7
1993 general election	6 Jun 1993	—N/a	37.1	28.6	3.2	6.0	0.6	—N/a	21.0	8.5
CIS	12–30 Nov 1992	4,536	21.8	21.1	2.7	4.3	–	38.6	10.1	0.7
1991 regional election	26 May 1991	—N/a	29.1	24.3	5.5	3.6	0.6	—N/a	31.9	4.8

=== Victory preferences ===
The table below lists opinion polling on the victory preferences for each party in the event of a regional election taking place.

Polling firm/Commissioner	Fieldwork date	Sample size	PP	PSOE	Other/ None	Question	Lead
CIS	26 Apr–11 May 1995	3,001	44.2	23.6	0.7	31.4	20.6
CIS	2–17 Mar 1995	2,997	43.8	23.1	0.1	32.9	20.7

=== Victory likelihood ===
The table below lists opinion polling on the perceived likelihood of victory for each party in the event of a regional election taking place.

Polling firm/Commissioner	Fieldwork date	Sample size	PP	PSOE	Other/ None	Question	Lead
CIS	26 Apr–11 May 1995	3,001	62.2	8.4	–	31.9	53.8
CIS	2–17 Mar 1995	2,997	63.4	7.0	–	29.6	56.4

=== Preferred President ===
The table below lists opinion polling on leader preferences to become president of the Regional Government of Castile and León.

Polling firm/Commissioner	Fieldwork date	Sample size			Other/ None/ Not care	Question	Lead
Polling firm/Commissioner	Fieldwork date	Sample size	Lucas PP	Quijano PSOE	Other/ None/ Not care	Question	Lead
CIS	26 Apr–11 May 1995	3,001	41.6	18.4	3.4	36.5	23.2
CIS	2–17 Mar 1995	2,997	42.1	15.7	5.1	37.1	26.4

== Results ==
=== Overall ===
← Summary of the 28 May 1995 Cortes of Castile and León election results →
Parties and alliances	Popular vote			Seats	
Parties and alliances	Votes	%	±pp	Total	+/−
People's Party (PP)	805,553	52.20	+8.69	50	+7
Spanish Socialist Workers' Party (PSOE)	458,447	29.71	−6.73	27	−8
United Left of Castile and León (IU)	147,777	9.58	+4.22	5	+4
Leonese People's Union (UPL)	39,425	2.55	+1.72	2	+2
Commoners' Land–Castilian Nationalist Party (TC–PNC)	9,494	0.62	+0.48	0	±0
Independent Solution (SI)	9,107	0.59	New	0	±0
Independent Group of Ávila (AIAV)	8,159	0.53	New	0	±0
Party of El Bierzo (PB)	6,646	0.43	+0.11	0	±0
Regionalist Unity of Castile and León (URCL)^{1}	6,318	0.41	−0.03	0	±0
Platform of Independents of Spain (PIE)	4,630	0.30	New	0	±0
People's Palentine Group (APP)	4,071	0.26	New	0	±0
Regionalist Party of the Leonese Country (PREPAL)	3,744	0.24	+0.09	0	±0
Independents for León (IPL)	3,290	0.21	New	0	±0
Independent Candidacy of Valladolid (CIV)	2,148	0.14	New	0	±0
The Greens–Green Group (LV–GV)	1,423	0.09	New	0	±0
The Alternative Greens (LVA)	1,374	0.09	New	0	±0
Spanish Phalanx of the CNSO (FE–JONS)	1,102	0.07	+0.01	0	±0
Provincialist Party of El Bierzo (PPB)	909	0.06	New	0	±0
Communist Party of the Peoples of Spain (PCPE)	746	0.05	−0.01	0	±0
Sorian Progressive Union (US)	417	0.03	New	0	±0
Democratic and Social Centre (CDS)	n/a	n/a	−8.14	0	−5
Blank ballots	28,284	1.83	+0.17		
Total	1,543,064			84	±0
Valid votes	1,543,064	99.11	+0.04		
Invalid votes	13,911	0.89	−0.04		
Votes cast / turnout	1,556,975	73.46	+5.89		
Abstentions	562,523	26.54	−5.89		
Registered voters	2,119,498				
Sources
Footnotes: ^{1} Regionalist Unity of Castile and León results are compared to the combined totals of Regionalist Democracy of Castile and León and Palentine Unity in the 1991 election.

Popular vote
PP	52.20%
PSOE	29.71%
IU	9.58%
UPL	2.55%
Others	4.12%
Blank ballots	1.83%

Seats
PP	59.52%
PSOE	32.14%
IU	5.95%
UPL	2.38%

=== Distribution by constituency ===
Constituency	PP		PSOE		IU		UPL	
Constituency	%	S	%	S	%	S	%	S
Ávila	58.4	5	23.8	2	8.2	−		
Burgos	52.8	7	24.9	3	12.7	1		
León	45.1	7	30.4	5	6.7	1	12.7	2
Palencia	52.3	4	31.9	3	8.4	−		
Salamanca	54.3	6	32.9	4	8.3	1		
Segovia	56.7	4	26.5	2	10.5	−		
Soria	59.2	4	28.3	1	8.2	−		
Valladolid	51.1	8	30.7	4	13.6	2		
Zamora	55.7	5	33.9	3	6.6	−		
Total	52.2	50	29.7	27	9.6	5	2.6	2

== Aftermath ==
=== Government formation ===
Investiture; Nomination of Juan José Lucas (PP)
Ballot →	4 July 1995
Required majority →	43 out of 84
Yes: • PP (50)	50 / 84
No: • PSOE (26); • IU (5); • UPL (2)	33 / 84
Abstentions	0 / 84
Absentees: • PSOE (1)	1 / 84

== Bibliography ==
- Ley Orgánica 4/1983, de 25 de febrero, de Estatuto de Autonomía de Castilla-León (Organic Law 4/1983). Official State Gazette (in Spanish). 25 February 1983. BOE-A-1983-6483.
- Ley Orgánica 5/1985, de 19 de junio, del Régimen Electoral General (Organic Law 5/1985). Official State Gazette (in Spanish). 19 June 1985 [version as of 24 March 1995]. BOE-A-1985-11672.
- Ley 3/1987, de 30 de marzo, Electoral de Castilla y León (Law 3/1987). Official State Gazette (in Spanish). 30 March 1987 [version as of 26 March 1991]. BOE-A-1987-9475.
- Decreto 59/1995, de 3 de abril, del Presidente de la Junta de Castilla y León, por el que se convocan elecciones a las Cortes de Castilla y León (PDF) (Decree 59/1995). Official Gazette of Castile and León (in Spanish). 3 April 1995. BOCYL-D-04041995-1.
