= Fuensaldaña Castle =

Castle in Spain

Coordinates: 41.7062°N 4.7675°W

Castle of Fuensaldaña
- Castillo de Fuensaldaña
- Fuensaldaña, Province of Valladolid, Castile and León, in Spain
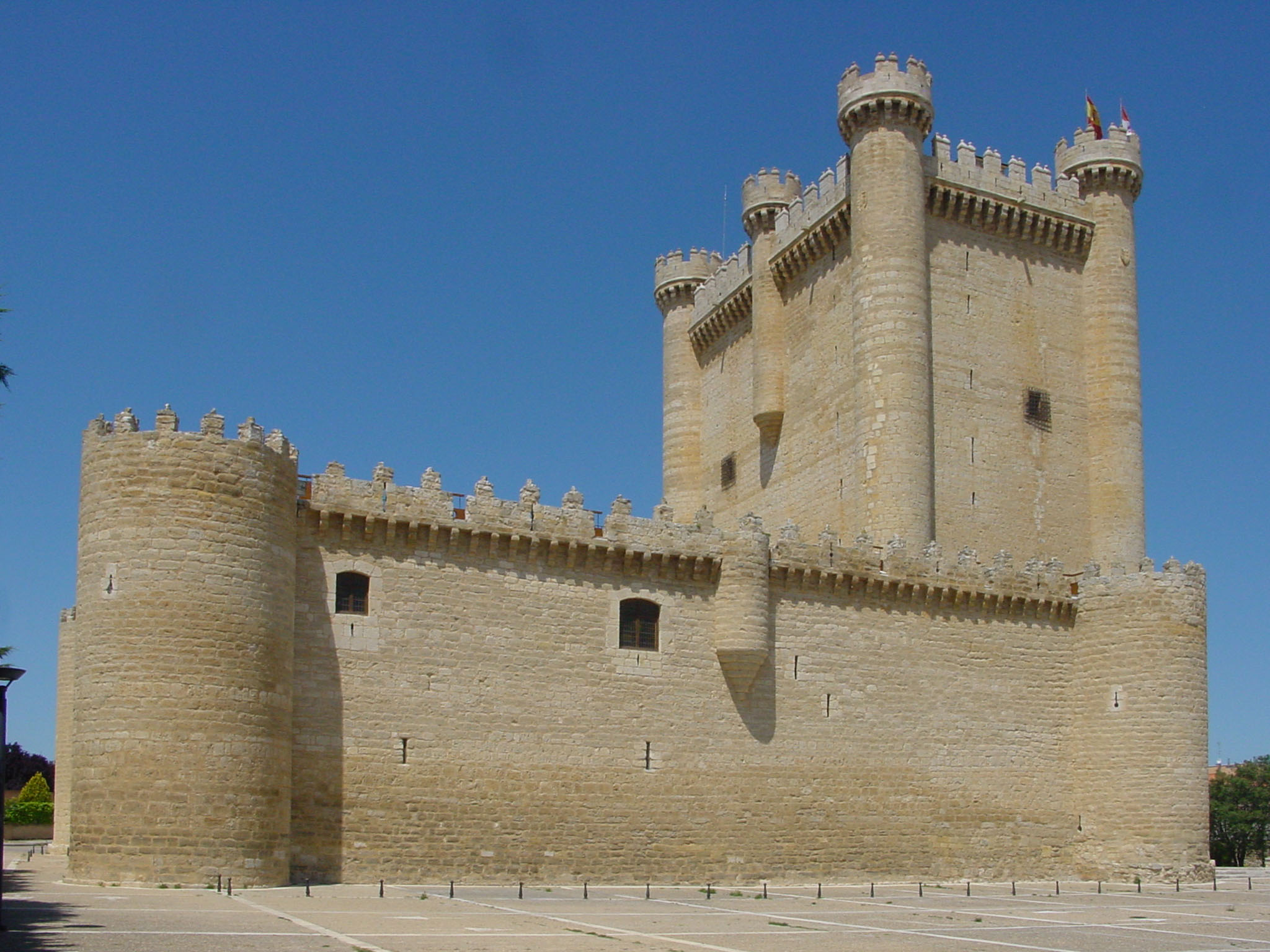
- Castle of Fuensaldaña in 2007

Site information
- Type: Castle
- Owner: Provincial deputation of Valladolid
- Open to the public: Yes

Site history
- Built: 15th century
- In use: Medieval museum
- Materials: Rocks

Fuensaldaña Castle (Spanish: Castillo de Fuensaldaña) is a castle in the Spanish village of Fuensaldaña, situated 6 kilometres from Valladolid, the largest city of Castile and León.

== History ==
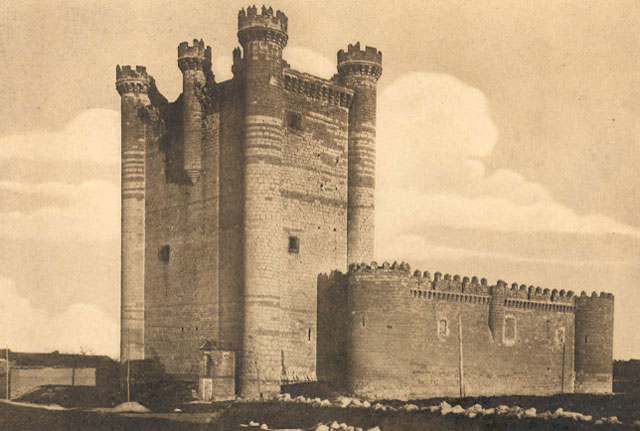
Old image

Construction on the site began in the 13th century, but the castle did not take its current form until the mid-15th. Captive Moors were used to build it.

Alonso Pérez de Vivero, who ordered its construction, was murdered for conspiring against Álvaro de Luna, a favourite of John II of Castile. The Catholic Monarchs of Spain confiscated the castle from the Vivero family due to their opposition in the War of Castilian Succession; it was returned in 1490. The Catholic Monarchs themselves spent their honeymoon in the castle in 1469, and in 1521 the castle was occupied in the Revolt of the Comuneros.

In July 1983 Demetrio Madrid, the President of the Junta of Castile and León, chose the castle to be the seat of the Cortes of Castile and León, the regional legislature. In 2007 the legislature moved to a brand new building in Valladolid, in an economic blow to both the castle's owners the Province of Valladolid and the people of the village.

Renovations started in 2011 ended in late 2012 when the castle was opened to the public as a tourist site, and venue for weddings, conferences and concerts. By 2015, it was safe for tourists to access the roof of the tower.
