= Ander Gil =

Spanish politician (born 1974)

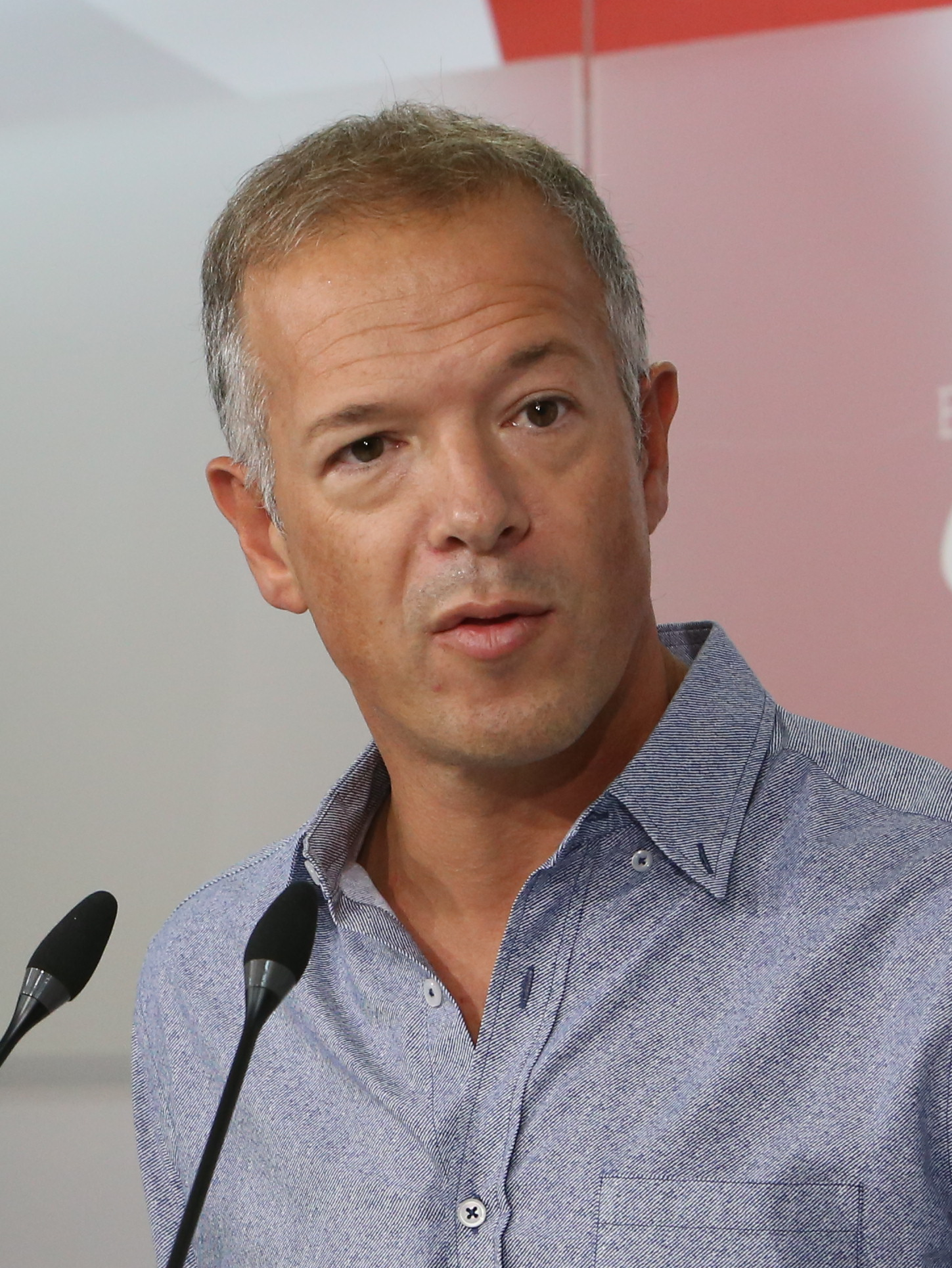

62nd President of the Senate
- In office 12 July 2021 – 16 August 2023
- Monarch: Felipe VI
- Vice President: Cristina Narbona; Pío García-Escudero
- Preceded by: Pilar Llop
- Succeeded by: Pedro Rollán

Spokesperson of the Socialist Group in the Senate
- In office 19 June 2017 – 11 July 2021
- Preceded by: Vicente Álvarez Areces
- Succeeded by: Eva Granados

Member of the Senate
- Incumbent
- Assumed office 13 December 2011
- Constituency: Burgos

Councillor of the Mena Valley
- In office 23 June 1995 – 13 June 2011

Personal details
- Born: Ander Gil García; 9 February 1974 (age 52) Barakaldo, Spain
- Party: PSOE
- Education: University of Burgos
- Occupation: Teacher and politician

Ander Gil García (born 9 February 1974) is a Spanish teacher and politician who served as the 62nd president of the Senate of Spain from 2021 to 2023. Gil has been Senator for Burgos since 2011 and Spokesperson of the Socialist Group in the Senate from 2017 to 2021. Previously, Gil served as a local councillor for Valle de Mena from 1995 to 2011.

== Biography ==
Gil was born in Barakaldo, Biscay. He graduated as an elementary school teacher in the University of Burgos and he started his political career at the age of 21, when he was elected local councillor in Valle de Mena, Burgos province. He was appointed by Mayor Armando Robredo Cerro as Councillor for Culture, Education and Youth. He also worked at Biscay in a Reception Center for Foreign Unaccompanied Minors.

=== National politics ===
After more than fifteen years in local politics, Gil was appointed candidate to the Senate for the Province of Burgos for the Spanish Socialist Workers' Party, being elected for the first time in the 2011 general election.

He acquired greater fame after the 2016 PSOE crisis when, after supporting Pedro Sánchez, the latter rewarded him by appointed him as Spokesperson of the Socialist Group in the Senate.

On 27 October 2017, Gil defended the application of Article 155 of the Constitution in Catalonia from the tribune of the Senate on behalf of the PSOE, after this region held an illegal referendum and approved a disconnection law and a unilateral declaration of independence during the premiership of Mariano Rajoy (PP).

After the vote of no confidence against the government of Rajoy and the election of Pedro Sanchez as Prime Minister on 1 June 2018, the PSOE faced an absolute majority in the Senate of the PP (62 socialist senators vs 146 PP senators), which had the objective of hindering the work of the socialist government, as was demonstrated by the PP veto to increase the limit of expenditure of the General State Budget on 27 December 2018. This veto prevented the use of 6 extra billion euros.

During this period of minority government, Gil led the Socialist Parliamentary Group in the Senate managing to approve 86% of their initiatives debated in the Senate. Ander Gil also managed to defend the Prime Minister from the constant attacks of the People's Party, especially his demands to appear in the Senate without agreeing with the rest of the political forces and the Government itself. These PP attacks provoked an unprecedented scenario on 24 January 2019, when the PP convened an extraordinary plenary session in the Senate for the appearance of Pedro Sánchez, while he was at the World Economic Forum meeting in Davos (Switzerland).

In December 2018, he was named "Senator of the Year" by the Association of Parliamentary Journalists.

He ran for re-election in the 2019 general election, being re-elected for the third time and becoming the most voted senator in the Province, above his direct rival, the Mayor of Burgos, Javier Lacalle, from the People's Party. This was the first time in democracy that a candidate from the left managed to be the most voted senator.

Also in this elections, the Spanish Socialist Workers' Party got an absolute majority for the first time since 1993. As a reward for his job during the minority government, Sánchez nominated him again to lead the Socialist Group in the Senate, a nomination that was approved by the Executive Body of the Party.

In July 2021, the 61st president of the Senate, Pilar Llop, resigned after her nomination as Minister of Justice. Because of this, the majority of the chamber elected Gil as the 62nd President of the Senate of Spain on 12 July 2021.

Political offices
Preceded by Pilar Llop	President of the Spanish Senate; 2021–2023	Succeeded by Pedro Rollán
