= 9th Cortes Generales =

Overview
- Legislative body: Cortes Generales
- Jurisdiction: Spain
- Meeting place: Palacio de las Cortes
- Term: 1 April 2008 – 27 September 2011
- Election: 2008 general election
- Members: 350 (Congress); 264 (Senate)
- President of the Congress: José Bono (PSOE)
- President of the Senate: Javier Rojo (PSOE)
- Prime Minister: José Luis Rodríguez Zapatero (PSOE)
- Leader of the Opposition: Mariano Rajoy (PP)

The 9th Cortes Generales comprised both the lower (Congress) and upper (Senate) houses of the legislature of Spain following the 2008 general election on 9 March 2008. They first convened on 1 April 2008, and were dissolved on 27 September 2011.

== Congress of Deputies ==
=== Composition ===
| Parliamentary Group | Apr 2008 | Nov 2008 | May 2011 |
|---|---|---|---|
| Socialist Group | 169 | 169 | 169 |
| People's Group | 154 | ↓153 | ↓152 |
| Convergence and Union Catalan Group | 10 | 10 | 10 |
| ERC–IU–ICV Group | 7 | ↓5 | 5 |
| PNV Basque Group | 6 | 6 | 6 |
| Mixed Group | 4 | ↑7 | ↑8 |
Source: historiaelectoral.com
