= José Manuel Fernández Santiago =

Spanish politician (born 1958)

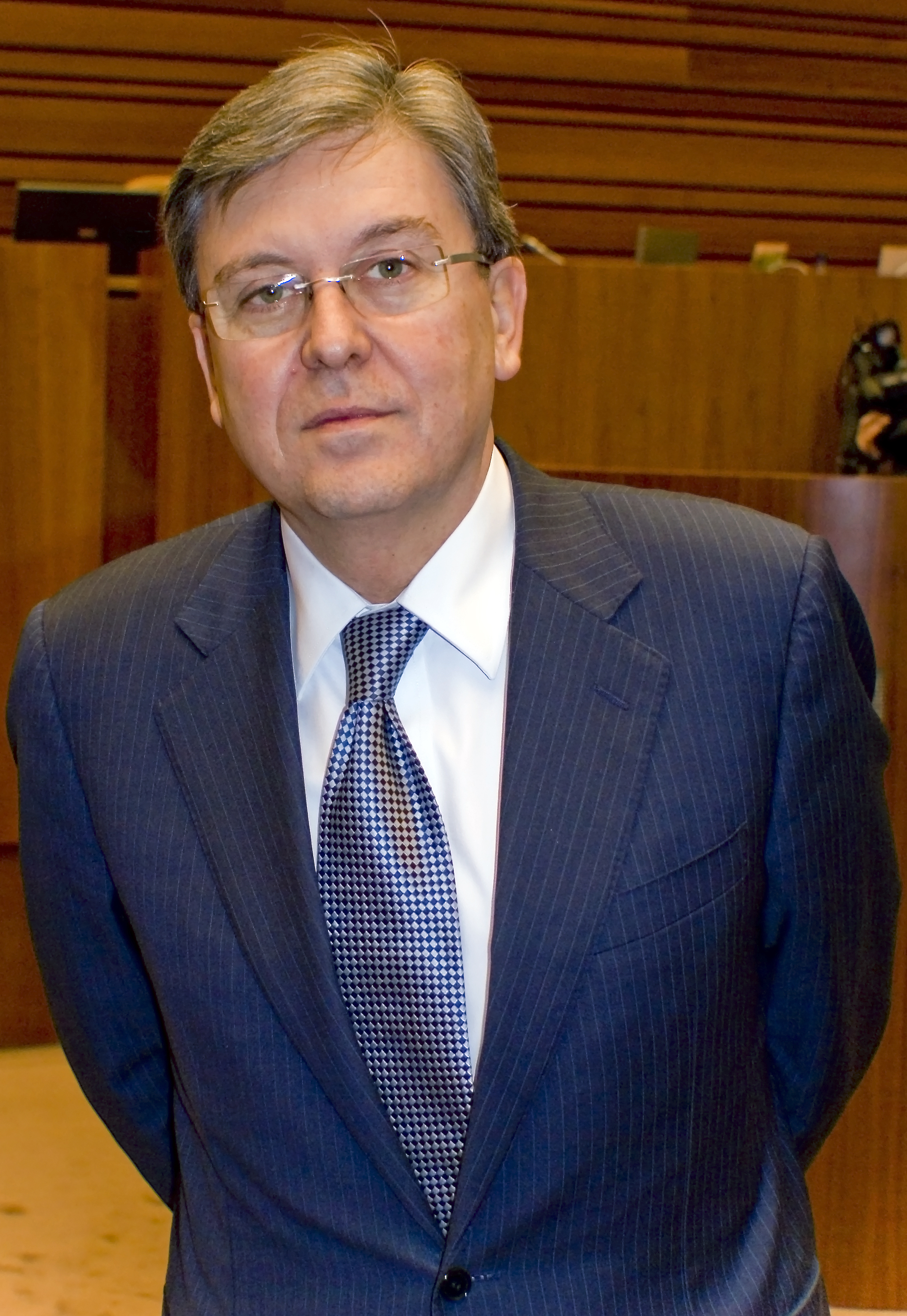
- José Manuel Fernández

President of the Cortes of Castile and León
- In office 17 June 2003 – 14 June 2011
- Preceded by: Manuel Estella
- Succeeded by: Josefa García Cirac

Deputy of the Cortes of Castile and León for Ávila
- Incumbent
- Assumed office 26 May 1991

Personal details
- Born: 30 April 1958 (age 68) Arenas de San Pedro, Spain
- Party: People's Party
- Children: 2
- Education: University of Salamanca
- Occupation: Politician; Lawyer

José Manuel Fernández Santiago (born 30 April 1958) is a Spanish politician and lawyer. He is a member of the People's Party. He was the president of the Cortes of Castile and León from 2003 to 2011. He is current deputy of the Cortes of Castile and León for Ávila since 1991. He was minister of health of the Junta of Castile and León from 1991 to 1999. He was the first vice president of Junta of Castile and León for 3 years. He was the minister for development in Junta of Castile and León.

== Biography ==
José was born in Arenas de San Pedro on 30 April 1958. He is married and with two children. He graduated in law from the University of Salamanca in 1975-1980. He also graduated from the Salamanca School of legal practice.
