= José Sarrión =

Spanish professor and politician

José Sarrión Andaluz
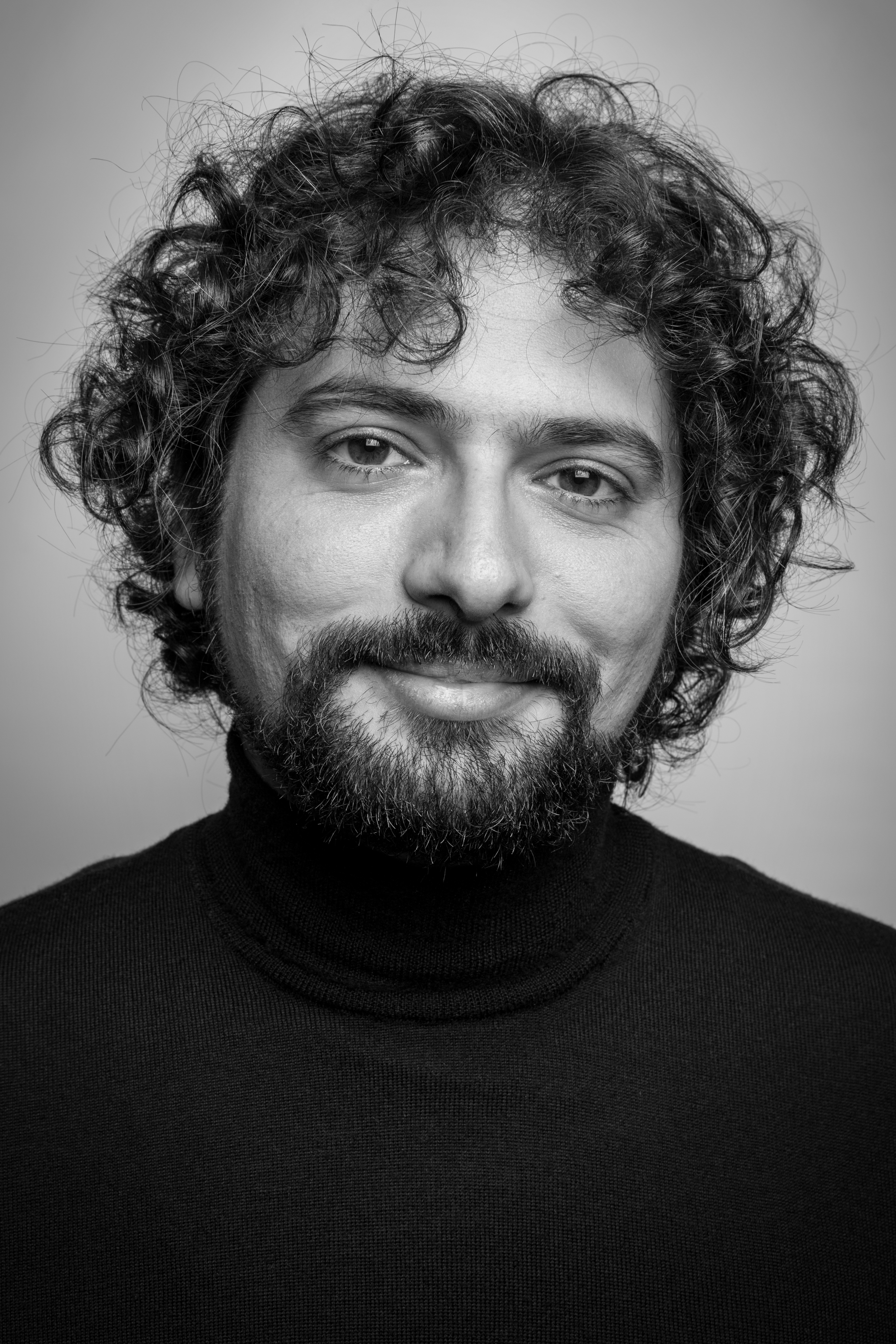

General Coordinator of United Left of Castile and León
- Incumbent
- Assumed office 30 September 2016
- Preceded by: José María González

Procurator in the Cortes of Castile and León
- Incumbent
- Assumed office 16 June 2015
- Constituency: Valladolid

Personal details
- Born: 1982 (age 43–44) Cartagena, Spain
- Party: United Left; Communist Party of Spain
- Education: Philosophy
- Alma mater: University of Salamanca; National University of Distance Education
- Occupation: Professor, politician

José Sarrión Andaluz (born 1982 in Cartagena) is a Spanish politician, former procurator in the Cortes of Castile and León, author, and member of United Left.

== Biography ==
Born in Cartagena in 1982, Sarrión has a PhD in Philosophy and is Professor of Anthropology in the Pontifical University of Salamanca.

Sarrión has been a member of the United Left and the Communist Party of Salamanca since the 1990s. In 2015 he was elected as presidential candidate of the Junta of Castile and León in an open consultation, obtaining a seat of procurator in the Cortes of Castile and León in the regional elections of May.

In September 2016 he was elected General Coordinatorof United Left of Castile and León.
