= Luis Fuentes (politician) =

Spanish politician (born 1960)

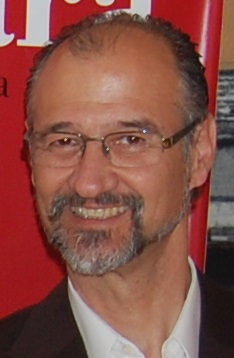
- Fuentes in 2015

President of the Cortes of Castile and León
- In office 21 June 2019 – 10 March 2022
- Preceded by: Ángel Ibáñez Hernando
- Succeeded by: Carlos Pollán

Member of the Cortes of Castile and León
- In office 19 June 2015 – 10 March 2022
- Constituency: Valladolid

Personal details
- Born: 20 December 1960 (age 65) Salamanca, Spain
- Party: Citizens
- Other political affiliations: Union of the Salamancan People (until 2014)
- Education: University of Salamanca
- Profession: Marketing specialist

Luis Fuentes Rodríguez (born 20 December 1960) is a Spanish politician of the Citizens party. He was a member of the Cortes of Castile and León from 2015 to 2022, serving as the legislature's president from 2019.

== Biography ==
Born in Salamanca, Fuentes graduated in Business Sciences from the University of Salamanca. A specialist in marketing, he worked for 18 years for a furniture company. He was the president of the localist Union of the Salamancan People (UPSa), which merged into the national party Citizens in 2014.

In March 2015, Fuentes secured enough signatures to be Citizens' lead candidate in the 2015 Castilian-Leonese regional election; he ran in the Valladolid constituency. His party entered the Cortes of Castile and León with five seats after taking 10.3% of the vote.

After the 2019 elections, Citizens agreed to form government with the People's Party (PP). As per this agreement, Fuentes was the two parties' candidate for President of the Cortes and was elected.

Towards the end of 2021, President of the Junta of Castile and León, Alfonso Fernández Mañueco, dissolved the PP's pact with Citizens and called new elections. Citizens' vote share fell and they only had one candidate elected, leader Francisco Igea, meaning that Fuentes lost his seat.
