= Francisco Vázquez =

Francisco Vázquez may refer to:

- Francisco Vázquez (conquistador) (fl. 1530s), Spanish conquistador in southern New Spain
- Francisco Vásquez de Coronado (c. 1510–1554), Spanish conquistador in northern New Spain
- Francisco Vázquez (cyclist) (born 1952), Mexican Olympic cyclist
- Francisco Vázquez Gómez (1860–1933), Mexican personal physician and politician
- Francisco Vázquez Requero (born 1959), Spanish politician
- Francisco Vázquez Vázquez (born 1946), Spanish politician and ambassador
- Francisco H. Vázquez (born 1949), Mexican-American scholar and public intellectual
- Fran Vázquez (born 1983), Spanish basketball player
