= Seat of the Cortes of Castile and León =

Coordinates: 41.6436°N 4.7448°W

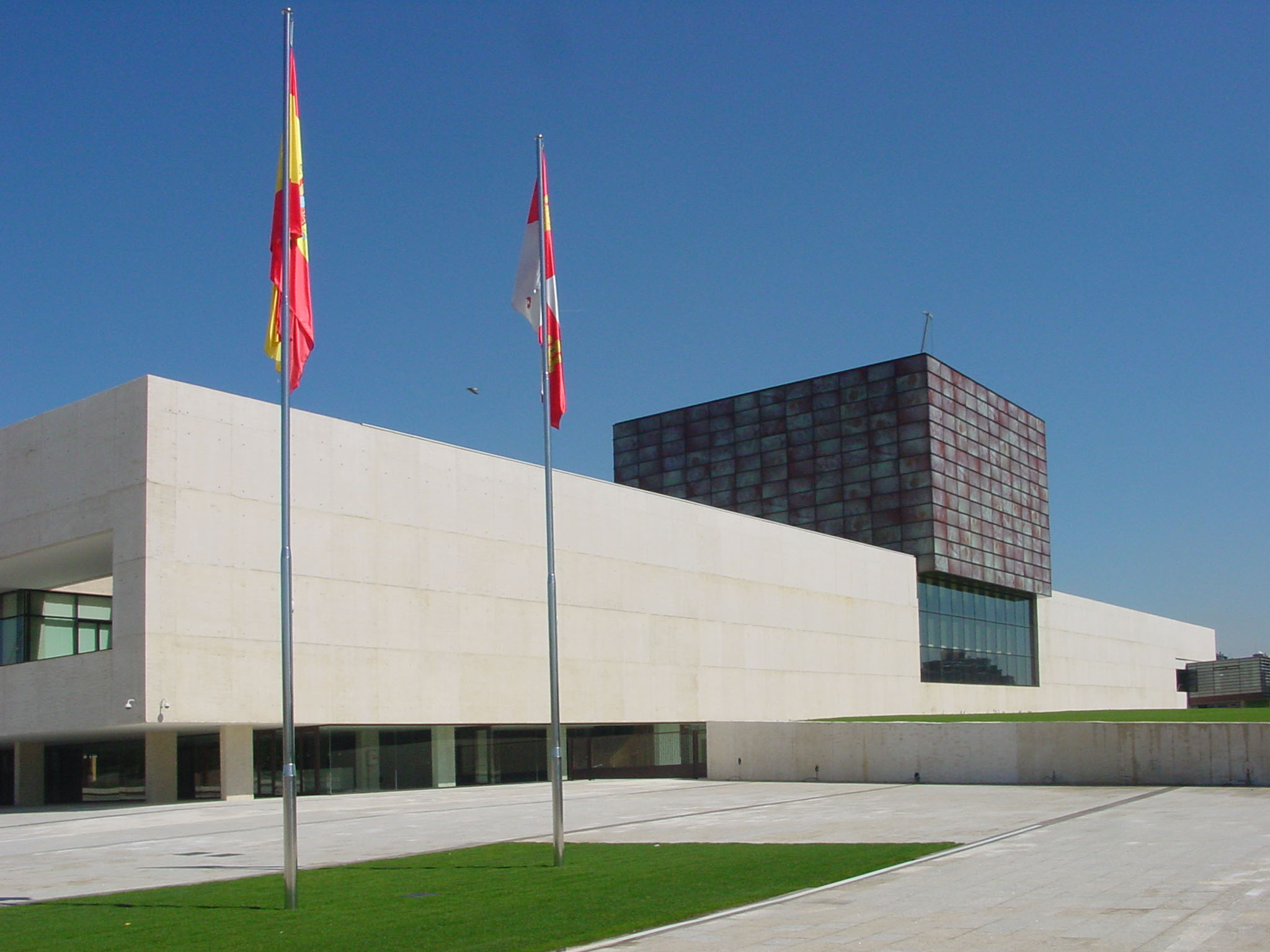

The Seat of the Cortes of Castile and León (Spanish: Sede de las Cortes de Castilla y León) is a legislative building opened in 2007 for the Cortes of Castile and León, situated in the city of Valladolid.

== History ==
The modern Cortes of Castile and León was first situated in the small town of Tordesillas on 21 May 1983, and then moved to Fuensaldaña Castle near Valladolid. In April 2004, work began on this new building designed by Ramón Fernández Alonso from Granada, though the final design was modified by local architects Leopoldo Cortejoso and Juan Antonio Coronado.

On 14 November 2007, the building was opened by King Juan Carlos I and Queen Sophia of Spain. Around 200 guests attended, including former presidents of the regional government and incumbents of neighbouring regions.

An initial €39.6 million budget rose to over €79.5 million costs by January 2009.

== Description ==
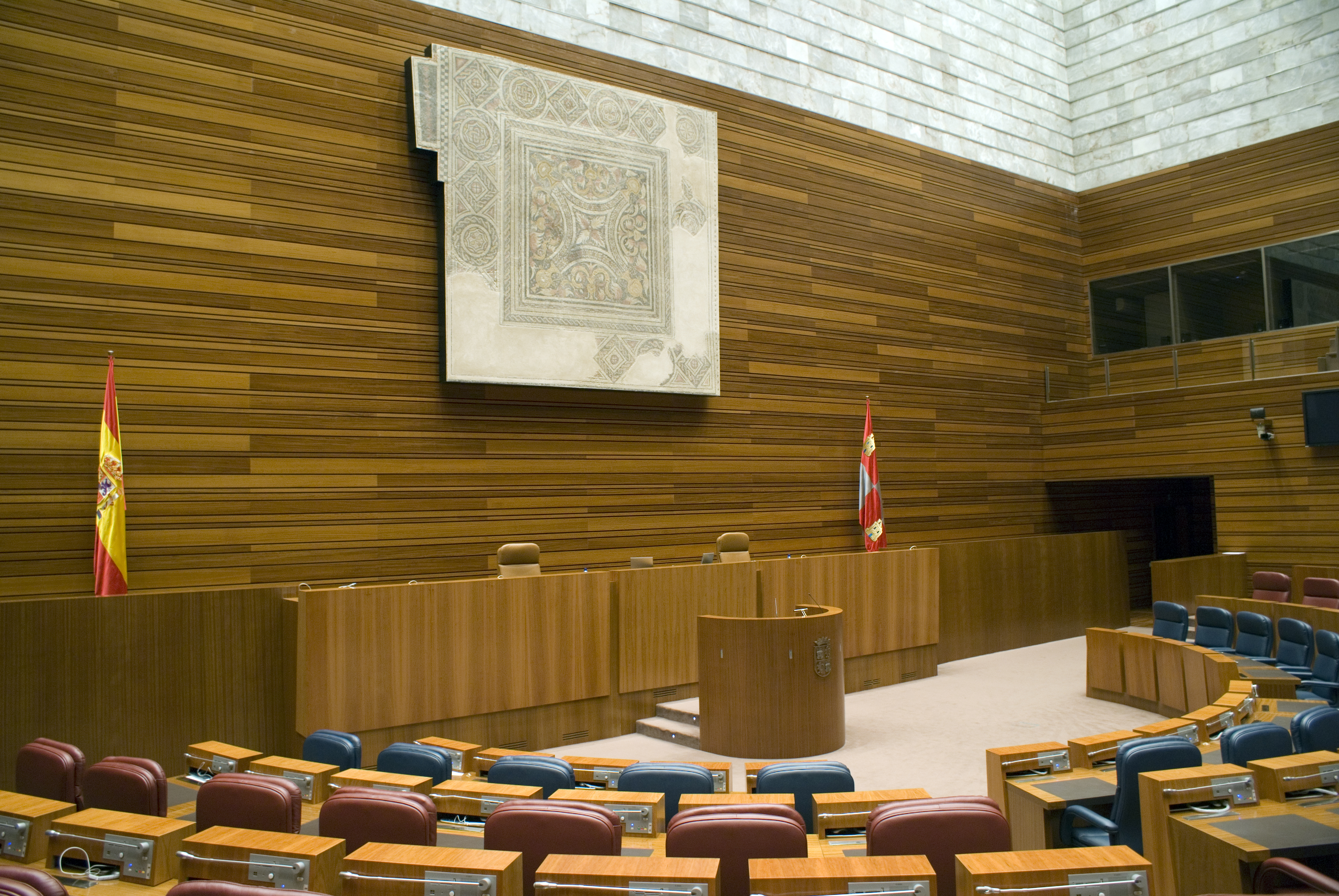
Main chamber of the building, displaying a 4th-century AD Roman mosaic found in the vicinity

Situated in the neighbourhood of Villa de Prado, the avant-garde building covers 30,000 square metres of floor space and is divided into four blocks.

The construction included materials from all nine of the region's provinces, including granite, quartz, marble and sandstone. In the main chamber, there is a mosaic from the 4th century AD, excavated from a former Roman villa on the site which gave its name to the neighbourhood.
