= List of presidents of the Cortes of Castile and León =

President of the Cortes of Castile and León
- Presidente de las Cortes de Castilla y León
- Flag of Castile and León
- Incumbent; Carlos Pollán since 10 March 2022
- Member of: Cortes of Castile and León
- Formation: 1983
- First holder: Dionisio Llamazares
- Website: ccyl.es

This article lists the presidents of the Cortes of Castile and León, the regional legislature of Castile and León.

== Presidents ==
No.	Name	Portrait	Party	Took office	Left office	^{Legs.}	^{Refs.}
1	Dionisio Llamazares		Socialist Party of Castile and León	1983	1987	1st	
2	Carlos Sánchez-Reyes		Democratic and Social Centre	1987	1991	2nd	
3	Manuel Estella		People's Party of Castile and León	1991	1995	3rd	
3	Manuel Estella		People's Party of Castile and León	1995	1999	4th	
3	Manuel Estella		People's Party of Castile and León	1999	2003	5th	
4	José Manuel Fernández		People's Party of Castile and León	17 June 2003	2007	6th	
4	José Manuel Fernández		People's Party of Castile and León	2007	14 June 2011	7th	
5	Josefa García		People's Party of Castile and León	14 June 2011	31 March 2015	8th	
6	Silvia Clemente		People's Party of Castile and León	16 June 2015	21 June 2019	9th	
7	Luis Fuentes		Citizens	16 June 2015	10 March 2022	10th	
8	Carlos Pollán		Vox	10 March 2022		11th	
