= Manuel Cruz Rodríguez =

Spanish philosopher and politician

The Most Excellent Manuel Cruz
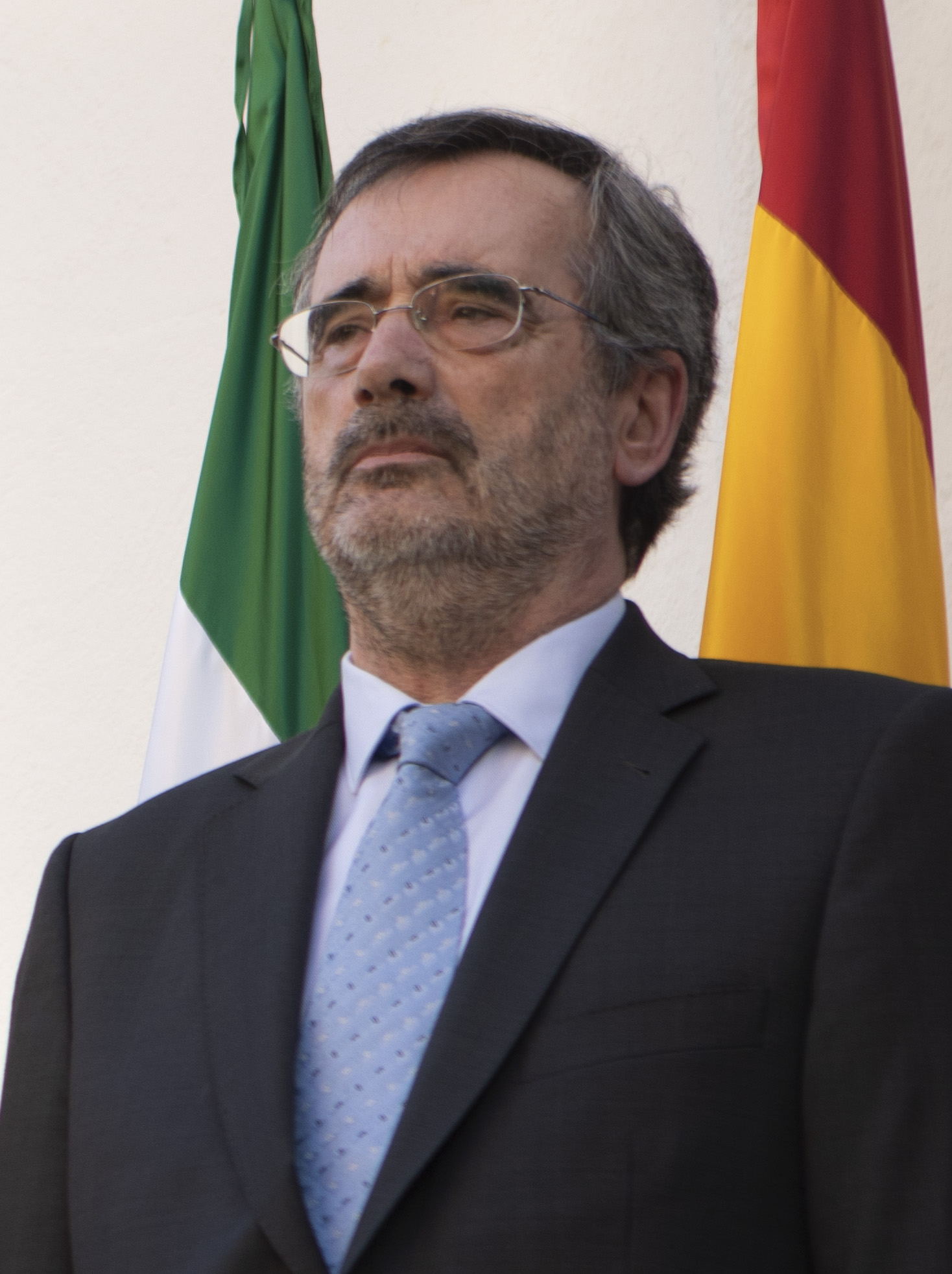

60th President of the Senate
- In office 21 May 2019 – 2 December 2019
- Monarch: Felipe VI
- Preceded by: Pío García-Escudero
- Succeeded by: Pilar Llop

Spanish Senator from Barcelona
- Incumbent
- Assumed office 21 May 2019

Member of the Congress of Deputies
- In office 13 July 2016 – 5 May 2019
- Constituency: Barcelona

Personal details
- Born: Manuel Cruz Rodríguez; 1 January 1951 (age 75) Barcelona, Spain
- Education: University of Barcelona
- Occupation: Philosopher and politician

Manuel Cruz Rodríguez (born 1 January 1951) is a Spanish philosopher and politician who served as the 60th President of the Senate from May to December 2019. Prior to this, between 2016 and 2019, Cruz served as member of the Congress of Deputies in representation of Barcelona. He is a member of the Socialists' Party of Catalonia.

== Biography ==
Manuel Cruz was born in the City of Barcelona in 1951. He graduated in philosophy in 1974 at the University of Barcelona and received his PhD in 1979 from the same university. He is Professor of Contemporary Philosophy at the University of Barcelona.

From 1986 to 1993 he directed the Department of History of Philosophy, Aesthetics and Philosophy of Culture of the Faculty of Philosophy. He has taught at various European and American universities, as well as a researcher at the Institute of Philosophy of the Spanish National Research Council.

As a professor he taught the subjects "Contemporary Philosophy" and "Philosophy of History" and his interests are centered in the reflection on contemporary theories of subjectivity, reflections on the place of memory and forgetting in the current world and philosophies of the action of diverse contemporary philosophical traditions.

He has been director of the collections "Contemporany Thought" and "Present Library" of the Paidós Editorial; and co-director of the collections "Filosofía, hoy" (Santillana Editorial) and "Biblioteca Iberoamericana de Ensayo" (Paidós México Editorial) and he currently manages the collection "Pensamiento Herder", in Herder Editorial. He is also editor of the series "Pensamiento 21" from the Los Libros de La Catarata Editorial. He was director of the Barcelona Metropolis magazine.

He is a regular contributor to media such as El País, El Confidencial, Catalunya Ràdio and Cadena SER.

In September 2012 he was one of the signatories of the manifest entitled "Call to the Federalist and Left-wing Catalonia" before the call for early regional election. This manifest was the origin of the Left-wing Federalists Association, an association created in 2013 to defend a federal Spain and opposing the independence of Catalonia. Cruz chaired this association between 2013 and 2016.

=== Political career ===
Considered a person close to the PSC leader Miquel Iceta, in May 2016 it was announced that he would occupy the number two position on the Barcelona list of the Party of Socialists of Catalonia headed by Meritxell Batet for the 2016 general election to the Congress of Deputies. He was elected MP and he was appointed Spokesman of the PSOE in the Committee for Science, Innovation and Universities and in the Committee for Education of the Congress. He also was one of the 15 PSOE-PSC deputies to vote against the investiture of Mariano Rajoy following the elections.

Cruz was elected Senator to the 13th Cortes Generales in the 2019 general election. Miquel Iceta, the PSC leader, was proposed to chair the Senate of Spain, however, the Parliament of Catalonia rejected the appointment of Iceta as Senator and the Socialist Party nominated Cruz as candidate. Cruz was elected the 60th President of the Senate for 140 votes in favour. The other candidate, Ruth Goñi of the Citizens party, retrieved 11 votes.

== Awards ==
- 2005: Anagrama Award for Las malas pasadas del pasado.
- 2010: Espasa Essay Award for Amo, luego existo.
- 2012: Jovellanos International Essay Prize for Adiós, historia, adiós.
- 2016: Miguel de Unamuno Essay Prize for La flecha (sin blanco) de la historia.

Political offices
Preceded by Pío García-Escudero	President of the Senate of Spain; 2019	Succeeded by Pilar Llop
