= Pilar Llop =

Spanish judge and politician

The Most Excellent Pilar Llop
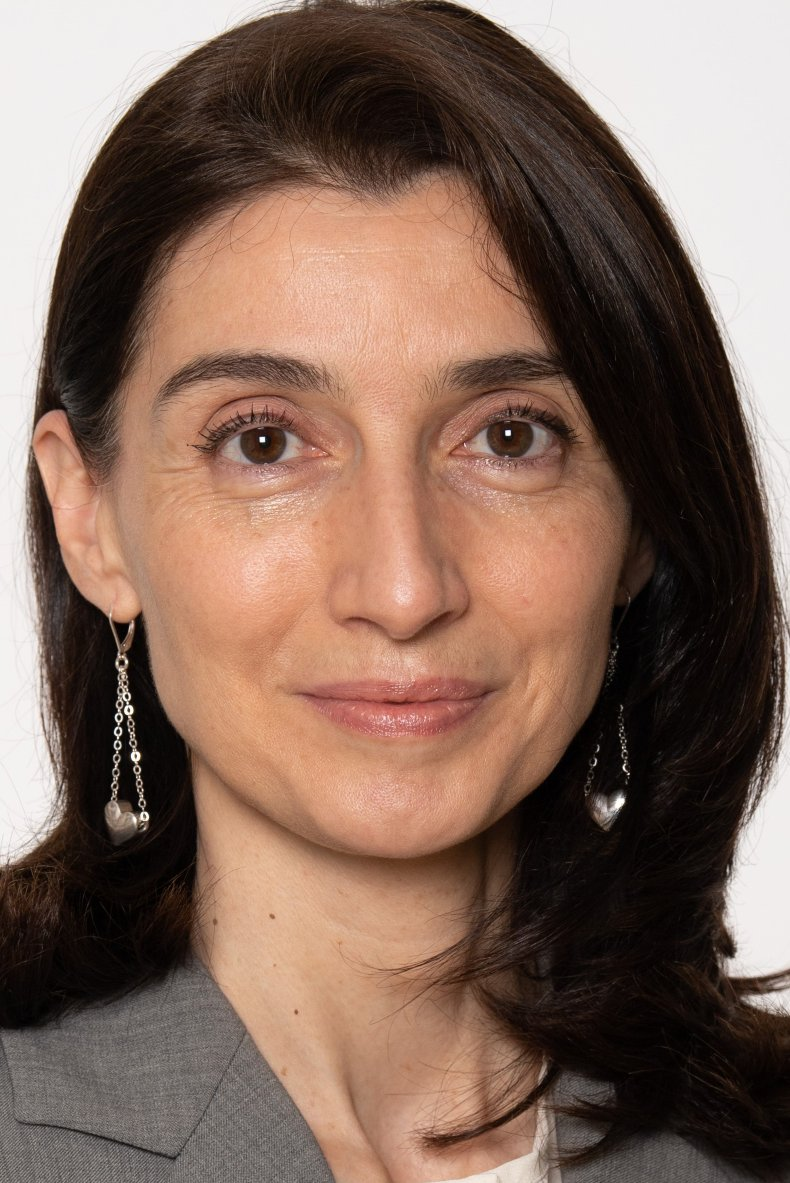

Minister of Justice First Notary of the Kingdom
- In office 12 July 2021 – 21 November 2023
- Prime Minister: Pedro Sánchez
- Preceded by: Juan Carlos Campo
- Succeeded by: Félix Bolaños

61st President of the Senate
- In office 3 December 2019 – 8 July 2021
- Monarch: Felipe VI
- Vice President: Cristina Narbona; Pío García-Escudero
- Preceded by: Manuel Cruz Rodríguez
- Succeeded by: Ander Gil

Member of the Senate
- In office 11 July 2019 – 8 July 2021
- Constituency: Assembly of Madrid

Government Delegate for Gender Violence
- In office 24 July 2018 – 13 April 2019
- Preceded by: María José Ordóñez
- Succeeded by: Rebeca Palomo

Member of the Assembly of Madrid
- In office 11 June 2019 – 12 July 2021
- In office 9 June 2015 – 13 July 2018

Personal details
- Born: 3 August 1973 (age 52) Madrid, Spain
- Citizenship: Spanish
- Occupation: Judge, politician, consultant

María Pilar Llop Cuenca (born 3 August 1973) is a Spanish judge and politician who served as the minister of Justice of Spain and ex officio First Notary of the Kingdom from 2021 to 2023. Previously, she served as the 61st president of the Senate of Spain. She has been Spanish Senator designated by the Assembly of Madrid, an assembly of which she has been part since June 2019. Previously, she was member of the Assembly of Madrid from 2015 to 2018 and Government Delegate for Gender Violence of the Government of Spain from 2018 to 2019.

== Early life and education ==
Born on 3 August 1973 in Madrid to a humble family; her father was a taxi-driver and her mother a hairdresser. She graduated with a degree in law at the Complutense University of Madrid. She also obtained a master's degree in judicial translation in the University of Alicante.

== Career ==
Llop entered the judiciary in 1999 and became a magistrate in 2004.

Llop ran in the Spanish Socialist Worker's Party (PSOE) list for the 2015 Madrilenian regional election led by Ángel Gabilondo and became a member of the 10th term of the regional legislature. She formalised the renouncement of her seat in the Assembly of Madrid on 13 July 2018, as she had been appointed by the Council of Ministers presided over by Pedro Sánchez as the new Government Delegate for Gender Violence. She was sworn into office on 24 July 2018.

During her time in office, Llop led efforts on reforming Spain’s insolvency law to simplify bankruptcy proceedings and meet a major condition agreed with the European Commission to obtain European Union recovery funds.
