= Daniel de la Rosa (politician) =

Spanish politician

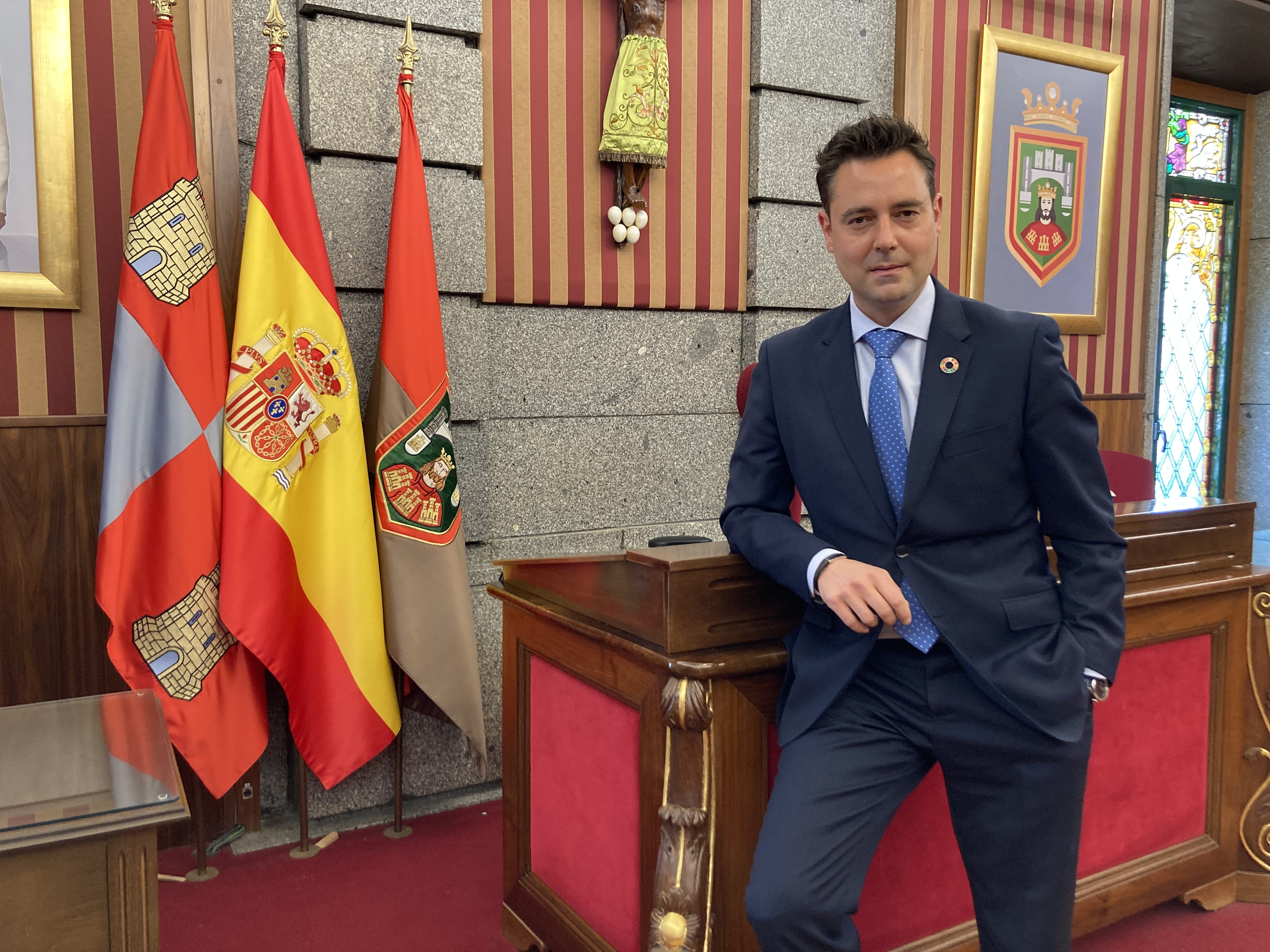

Daniel de la Rosa Villahoz (born 10 September 1980) is a politician of the Spanish Socialist Workers' Party (PSOE). He was a member of the city council of Burgos (2007–2011; 2015–2025) and the city's mayor (2019–2023). In 2026, he was elected to the Cortes of Castile and León.

== Early life and local politics ==
Born in Burgos in Castile and León, De la Rosa graduated in political sciences and in administration from the University of Burgos, as well as having diplomas in public administration and management. He joined the Socialist Youth of Spain when he was 22, leading its branch in Burgos. A year later he joined the Spanish Socialist Workers' Party (PSOE), and was first elected onto the city council in 2007.

De la Rosa missed out on re-election in the 2011 Spanish local elections but was named the lead candidate for the PSOE four years later. Incumbent Javier Lacalle of the People's Party (PP) retained the mayor's office with the support of his 10 councillors; De la Rosa had support of 13 between his party's 6 and 7 from a localist party, but this was not enough for a majority so the mayoralty went to the most voted list leader.

In the 2019 election, De la Rosa was elected mayor with the combined 13 seats of his party and Podemos. Rival Vicente Marañón of Citizens (Cs) had the 12 votes of his party and the PP, as the two councillors of Vox broke with their agreement and voted for their own leader. De la Rosa's election ended 16 years of PP government in the city; the only other Socialist mayor in Burgos's history was Ángel Olivares.

Despite being elected with the support of Podemos, De la Rosa's PSOE governed in a minority government until October 2020, when they struck a coalition government with the five councillors of Cs, making Marañón deputy mayor. In the run-up to the 2023 elections, with Cs forecast to have major losses, De la Rosa said that he would be a better fit for voters of the liberal party, in comparison to the conservative PP and Vox. De la Rosa's PSOE was the most voted-for party in the election, but PP and Vox formed a coalition and Cristina Ayala was elected mayor.

== Regional politics ==
In February 2025, Carlos Martínez Mínguez was named secretary general of the Socialist Party of Castile and León, and named De la Rosa as the secretary of organisation. Despite this move into regional politics, he remained the PSOE spokesperson in the Burgos city council. On 4 November, he resigned his municipal seat.

De la Rosa led the PSOE list in the Burgos constituency in the 2026 Castilian-Leonese regional election and was elected, as his party came runners-up to the PP overall and in the constituency. On 14 April, he was voted secretary of the Cortes.

== Personal life ==
In July 2022, De la Rosa married Blanca Carpintero, a councillor in his government.
