= Manuel Estella =

Spanish politician (1939–2026)

Manuel Estella Hoyos (19 August 1939 – 25 March 2026) was a Spanish politician. As a member of the People's Alliance and later People's Party, he was a deputy in the Cortes of Castile and León from 1983 to 2003, and the legislature's president (speaker) from 1991 to 2003.

== Early life ==
Born in Salamanca, Estella graduated with a law degree from the University of Salamanca. In 1970, he was made a member of the State Lawyers Corps, and worked in Lugo, Oviedo and Zamora before returning to Salamanca.

== Career ==
Estella's political career began in 1982, when he joined the People's Alliance (AP), which later became the People's Party (PP); from 1984 to 1992 he led the party in the Province of Salamanca. He was elected to the Cortes of Castile and León in the first regional election in 1983, and retained his seat until 2003. He remained a state lawyer until becoming president of the Cortes (speaker) in 1991. After leaving politics in 2003, he was a legal advisor to the Fundación Obra Social de Castilla y León.

In a 2007 interview, he said that he did not miss internal party politics, but did miss the presidency of the Cortes, describing it as "the most beautiful role there is".

== Personal life and death ==
In January 1983, Estella’s car was stolen from its garage by a gang who used it to steal 800,000 Spanish pesetas from a Banco Santander in Santa Marta de Tormes. His leisure interests included reading, golf and watching bullfights.

Estella died on 25 March 2026, at the age of 86. Alfonso Fernández Mañueco, the President of the Regional Government of Castile and León, remembered him as an "exemplary public servant and good friend".
