= Carlos Pollán =

Spanish politician (born 1966)

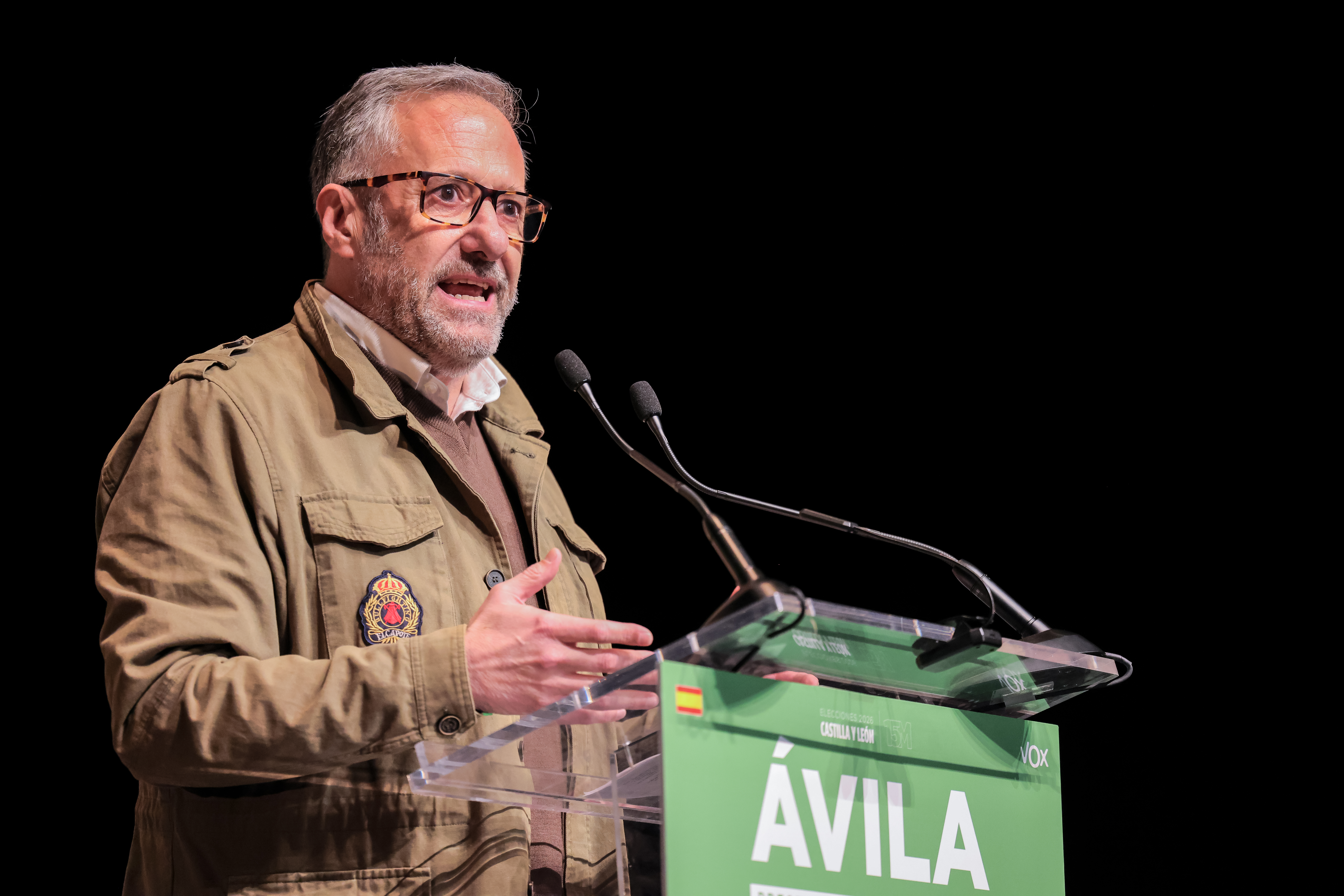
Pollán at a rally in Ávila in 2026

Carlo Pollán Fernández (born 1966) is a Spanish politician of the Vox party. He was formerly a player, coach and president of the CB Ademar León handball club. Elected to the Cortes of Castile and León in the 2022 election, he became the President of the Cortes. In the next election four years later, he led the party to third place and its highest percentage in any regional election.

== Early life and career ==
Born in León, Pollán is the son of a miner. He graduated in law and became an employment advisor, while being part of the CB Ademar León handball club from 1986 to 2013. He played as a goalkeeper for eight years and coached its youth teams before becoming club president in 2009. His presidency ended in bankruptcy over a €500,000 debt, with the club going through insolvency proceedings.

Pollán has two children and is separated from their mother.

== Political career ==
In 2019, Pollán ran unsuccessfully for mayor of Sariegos in the local elections, and in fifth on Vox's list for the Cortes of Castile and León in the regional election. In the same year, he became the fourth person in the same year to lead Vox in the Province of León, amidst a crisis over the party not entering the Provincial Deputation.

Pollán led Vox's list in León for the 2022 Castilian-Leonese regional election. On 10 March, the People's Party of regional president Alfonso Fernández Mañueco formed a government with Vox, the first regional government to include the party. Pollán became President of the Cortes, the speaker.

Pollán openly opposes Spain's division into autonomous communities, believing that this has turned a centralised state into 17 centralised states and has disadvantaged peripheral provinces such as his native León.

On 9 February 2026, Pollán was confirmed as Vox's lead candidate in the next month's regional election. El Confidencial noted his loyalty to party leader Santiago Abascal and his low media profile, both of which contrasted with predecessor Juan García-Gallardo. Polling before the election suggested that only 35% of regional voters knew who he was, rising to 60% for supporters of his party. He led the party to another third place in the election, growing by one seat up to 14 deputies, and achieving a best-ever percentage of just under 19%.
