= Pío García-Escudero =

Spanish architect and politician

The Most Excellent Pío García-Escudero 4th Count of Badarán OC OSP MS
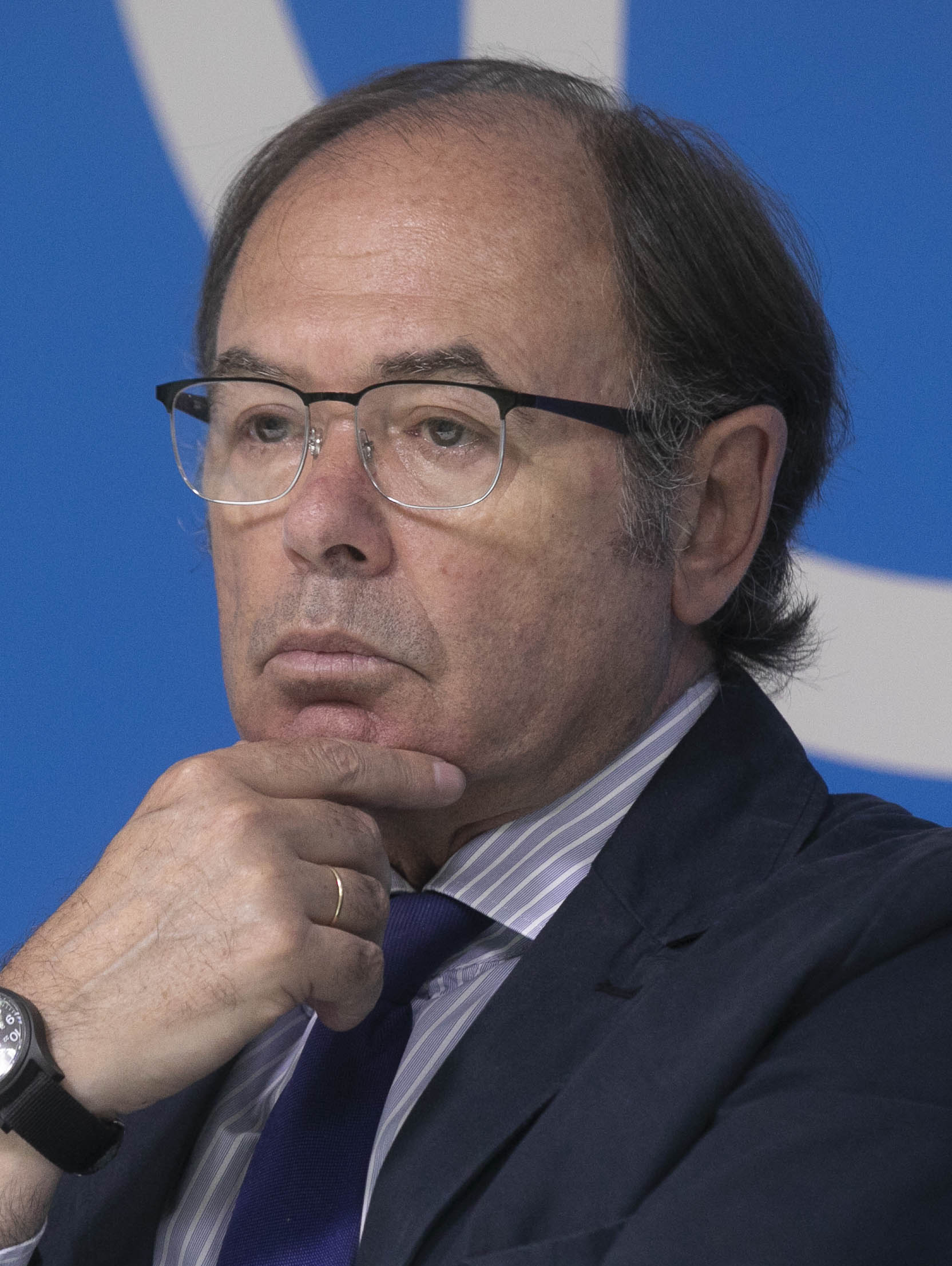

Second Vice President of the Senate
- Incumbent
- Assumed office 21 May 2019
- President: Manuel Cruz Rodríguez; Pilar Llop
- Preceded by: Joan Lerma

59th President of the Senate
- In office 13 December 2011 – 20 May 2019
- Monarchs: Juan Carlos I Felipe VI
- Vice President: Juan José Lucas; Pedro Sanz; Yolanda Vicente González; Joan Lerma
- Preceded by: Javier Rojo
- Succeeded by: Manuel Cruz Rodríguez

Member of the Senate
- Incumbent
- Assumed office 2 April 2004
- Constituency: Madrid

Personal details
- Born: Pío García-Escudero Márquez; 28 October 1952 (age 73) Madrid, Spain
- Party: People's Party
- Occupation: Politician

Pío García-Escudero Márquez, 4th Count of Badarán (born 28 October 1952) is a Spanish architect and politician who served as the 59th President of the Senate of Spain from 2011 to 2019. Since 21 May 2019, Escudero has served as the Second Vice President of the Senate.

== Early life ==
Born in 1952 in Madrid, where he was raised, he graduated from Technical University of Madrid and as an architect from Superior Technical School of Architecture of Madrid.

== Political career ==
García-Escudero Márquez was a senator from 9 April 1996 to 2 February 1999, and again from 13 April 2004 to 26 September 2011 as a member of the People's Party.

== Personal ==
García-Escudero Marquez was married on 15 June 1982 to María del Carmen Ramos Pérez. The couple has two children:

- Pío García-Escudero Ramos (b. 1984)
- Miguel García-Escudero Ramos (b. 1987)

He is involved in the Bárcenas affair corruption scandal and appeared before the court as a witness in Gürtel case trial on 26 July 2017.

== Honours ==
=== Foreign honours ===
- Peru: Grand Cross of the Order of the Sun of Peru (27 February 2019)
- Portugal: Grand Cross of the Order of Christ (Portugal)
- Portugal: Grand Cross of the Order of Aviz (15 April 2018)
