= Javier Rojo =

Spanish politician (born 1949)

Excelentísimo Señor Don Javier Rojo
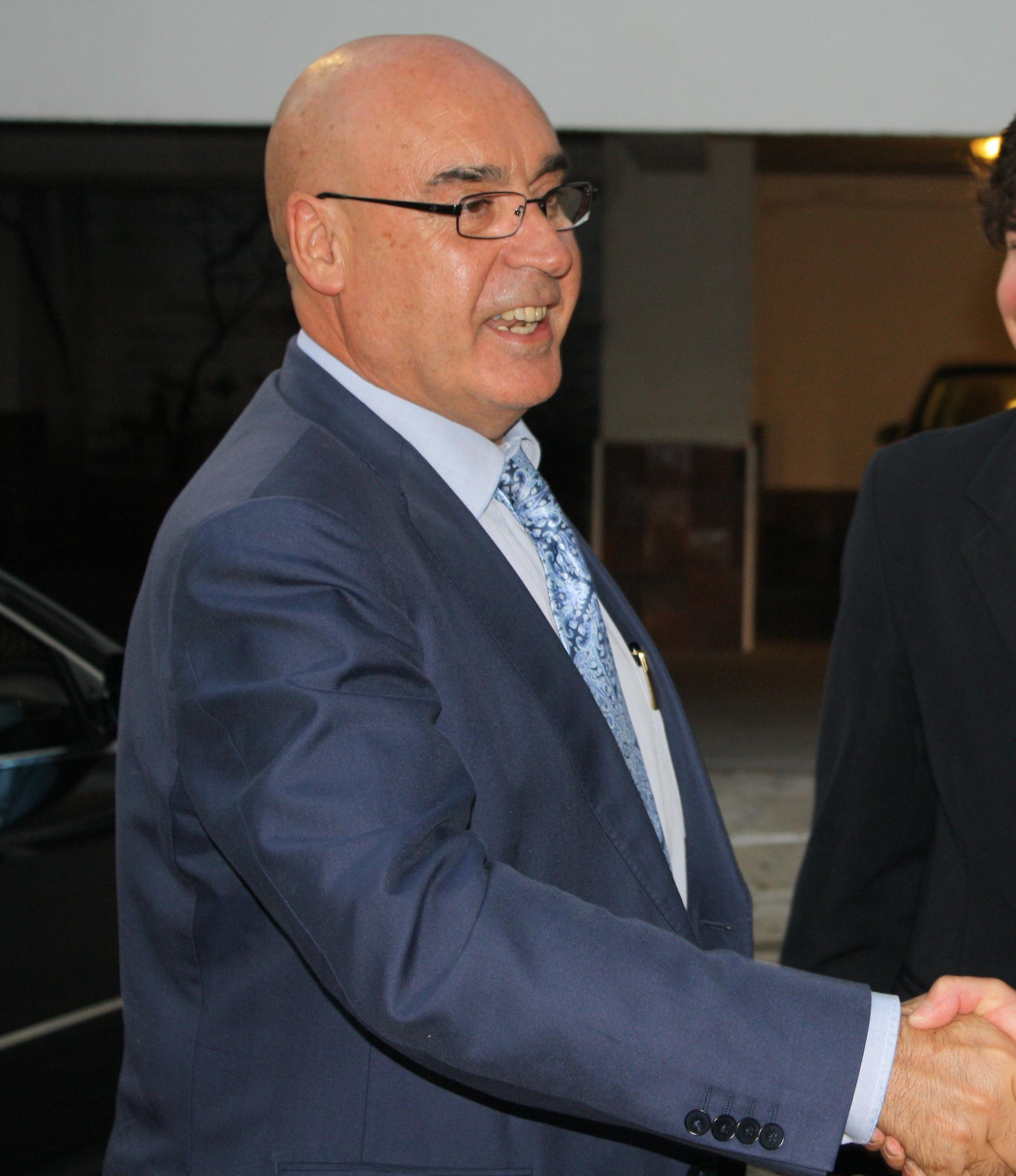

58th President of the Spanish Senate
- In office 2 April 2004 – 13 December 2011
- Preceded by: Juan José Lucas
- Succeeded by: Pío García-Escudero

Senator from Álava
- In office 1993–2011 Serving with Ramón Rabanera Rivacoba and Miguel Ángel Uzquiza González and Yolanda Vicente González
- Constituency: Álava

Personal details
- Born: Francisco Javier Rojo Garcia; 2 March 1949 (age 77) Pamplona, Navarre, Spain
- Party: PSOE (PSE-EE)
- Children: 2 Daughters
- Occupation: Politician
- Profession: Graphic Artist
- Website: Senate President

Francisco Javier Rojo Garcia (born 2 March 1949) is a Spanish socialist politician, from 2004 to 2011, he served as President of the Spanish Senate.

== Early life ==
Rojo Garcia was born on 2 March 1949 in the city of a village of Burgos. He moved to Vitoria-Gasteiz when he was very young. A lithographer and graphic artist by trade he moved into politics in 1976, and rose quickly through the ranks of the PSE-EE (Basque Socialist Party). He is married, and has two daughters.

== Political activity ==
He has been a member of the UGT (Universal Trade Union) since 1976, the year after he joined the PSE. In 1979 he was elected Provincial Councillor of Álava, a post he held until 1983. In the 1982 general election he was elected to the Congress for the constituency of Álava, he would be re elected in the elections of 1986 and 1989.

In the 1993 general election he was elected Senator for the constituency of Álava, a position to which he was re-elected in the elections of 1996, 2000, 2004 and 2008.

Since the victory of the Spanish Socialist Workers' Party in the 2004 general election, he served as President of the Senate from 2004 to 2011. In 2008, for his second term, he was the only presidential candidate on the ballot and was elected by an absolute majority on the first vote, receiving 134 of the 253 votes cast.

Political offices
Preceded by Juan José Lucas	President of the Spanish Senate; 2004–2011	Succeeded by Pío García-Escudero
