= Juan José Lucas =

Spanish attorney, professor and politician

The Most Excellent Juan José Lucas Giménez
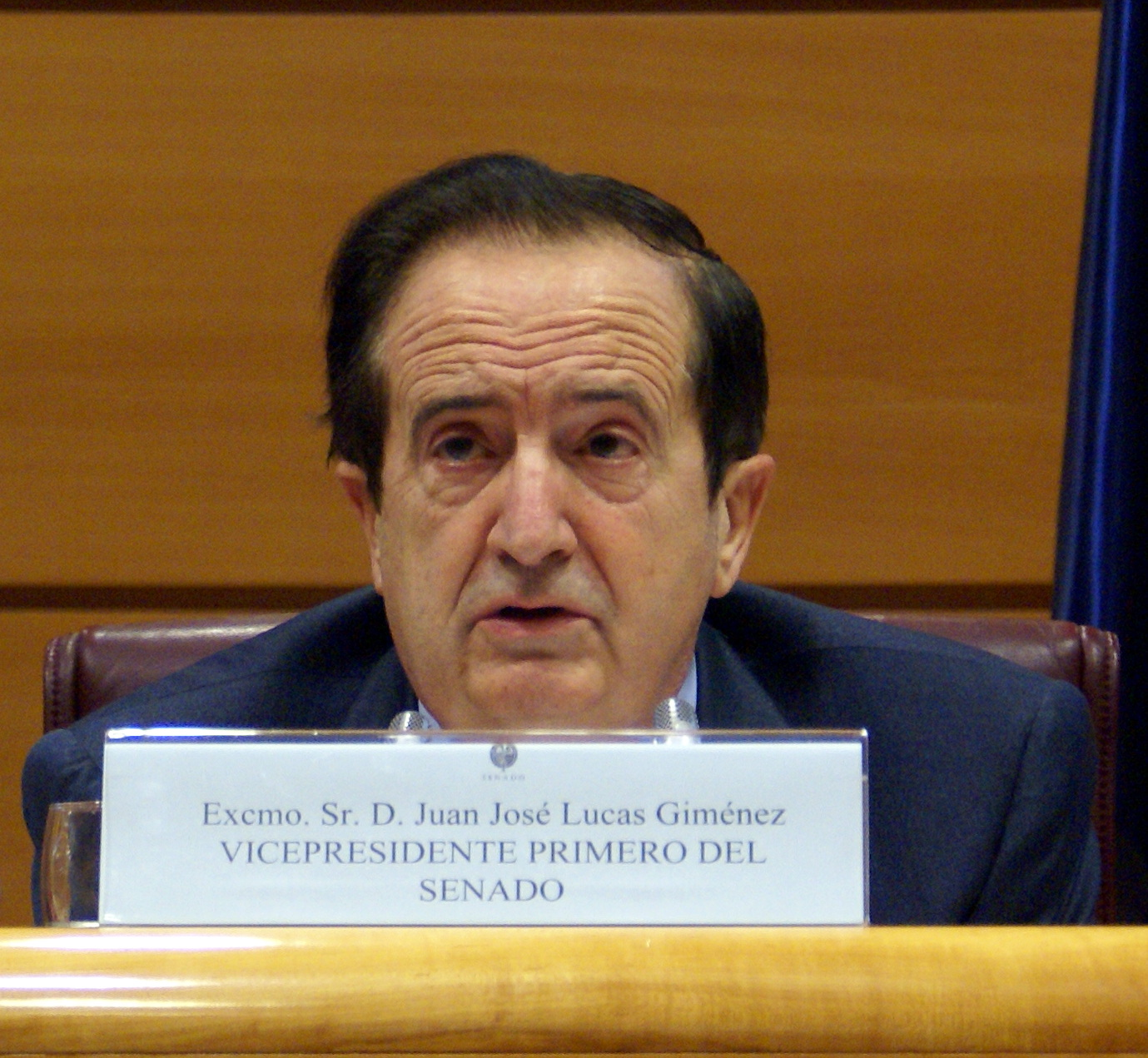

First Vice President of the Senate
- In office 13 December 2011 – 16 January 2016
- President: Pío García-Escudero
- Preceded by: Isidre Molas
- Succeeded by: Pedro Sanz

57th President of the Senate of Spain
- In office 16 October 2002 – 2 April 2004
- Preceded by: Esperanza Aguirre
- Succeeded by: Javier Rojo

Minister of the Presidency Secretary of the Council of Ministers
- In office 27 February 2001 – 10 July 2002
- Prime Minister: José María Aznar
- Preceded by: Mariano Rajoy
- Succeeded by: Mariano Rajoy

President of the Junta of Castile and León
- In office 4 July 1991 – 27 February 2001
- Prime Minister: Felipe González (1991–1996); José María Aznar (1996–2001)
- Preceded by: Jesús Posada
- Succeeded by: Juan Vicente Herrera

President of the People's Party of Castile and León
- In office 1991–2002
- Preceded by: José María Aznar
- Succeeded by: Juan Vicente Herrera

Member of the Congress of Deputies
- In office 22 June 1986 – 8 September 1987
- Constituency: Soria
- In office 28 October 1989 – 20 June 1991
- Constituency: Soria

Member of the Senate
- Incumbent
- Assumed office 22 March 2002
- Constituency: Castile and León

Member of the Cortes of Castile and León
- In office 21 June 1991 – 27 February 2001
- Constituency: Soria

Personal details
- Born: Juan José Lucas Giménez; 10 May 1944 (age 82) El Burgo de Osma, Soria, Spain
- Party: People's Party (1989–present)
- Education: Universidad Complutense de Madrid

Juan José Lucas Giménez (born 10 May 1944) is a Spanish attorney, professor and politician in the People's Party.

== Early life and education ==
Giménez was born in Burgo de Osma, Soria, Spain, on 10 May 1944. He graduated from the Universidad Complutense de Madrid with a degree in law.

== Professional career ==
Giménez worked as a professor in 1968 and 1969 and was also a tutor in Soria University. He joined INEM as a technician, and later held positions as secretary, Provincial Director, and Deputy Director General. He left the agency in 1982 to begin work in the Instituto Nacional de Colonización's sociologist group. He was Deputy Director General of Cooperatives in the Ministry of Labor and Social Affairs.

== Senate of Spain career ==
The Cortes of Castile and León appointed Giménez as a Senator on 22 March 2002. He later held the Presidency of the Senate of Spain, between 16 October 2002 and 2 April 2004, before his party lost its absolute majority in both houses in the general elections of 2004. Between 2004 and 2011 he was Second Vice President of the Senate. On 12 December 2011, Mariano Rajoy proposed Giménez to his party as Deputy President of the Senate of Spain for the 10th Legislature.
