= Jesús Quijano =

Spanish university professor

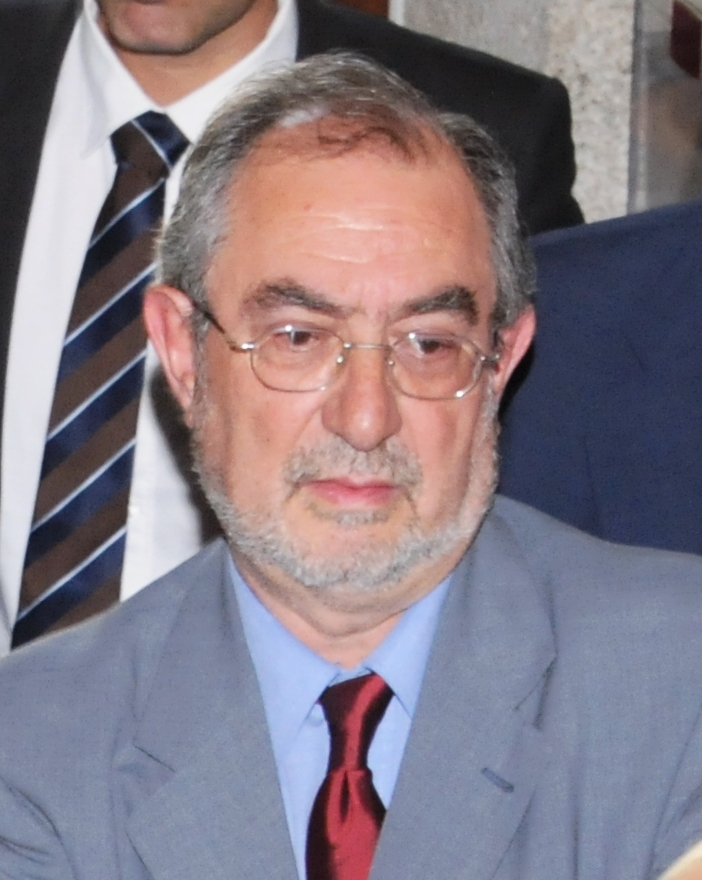
Jesús Quijano 2014 (cropped)

Jesús Quijano González (born 11 January 1951) is a Spanish university professor, jurist and politician who has carried out a large part of his political activity in Castile and León.

== Biography ==
Quijano was born on January 11, 1951, in Saldaña, province of Palencia. D. in Law from the University of Valladolid, he was awarded an extraordinary degree prize, obtaining the qualification of outstanding cum laude in his doctoral thesis.

He has been a scholarship holder, assistant professor and titular professor at the Faculty of Law of the University of Valladolid. Later he obtained the Chair of Commercial Law at the Faculty of Law of the University of Burgos and in 2008 he became Professor of Commercial Law at the Faculty of Economic Sciences of the University of Valladolid.

Quijano has been a member of the Spanish Socialist Workers' Party since 1974, and was General Secretary of the PSOE of Castile and León from 1990 to 2000. He has carried out his political activity in the Castile and León region, where he has been the Public Prosecutor from 1983 to 2003 and candidate to the Presidency of the Castile and León Government in 1991 and 1995. In 2003, he was elected by the Cortes of Castile and León as a member of the Advisory Council of that autonomous community.

In the 2008 general elections, he led the PSOE's candidacy to the Congress of Deputies for the electoral district of Valladolid, winning the seat.
