= Cortes of Castile and León =

Legislature of the Autonomous Community of Castile and León, Spain

Coordinates: 41.64381898060825°N 4.744677056070656°W

Cortes of Castile and León Cortes de Castilla y León
- Castile and León unicameral legislature

Type
- Type: Spanish regional legislature
- Houses: Unicameral

Leadership
- President: Francisco Vázquez Requero, PP since 14 April 2026
- Vice President: Carlos Menéndez, Vox since 14 April 2026
- Second Vice President: Nuria Rubio, PSOE since 14 April 2026
- Secretary: Daniel de la Rosa, PSOE since 14 April 2026
- Second Secretary: Rocío Lucas, PP since 14 April 2026
- Third Secretary: Susana Suárez, Vox since 14 April 2026

Structure
- Seats: 82
- Political groups: Government (47): PP (33); Vox (14); Opposition (35): PSOE (30); UPL (3); SY (1); XAV (1)
- Length of term: 4 years

Elections
- Last election: 15 March 2026

Meeting place
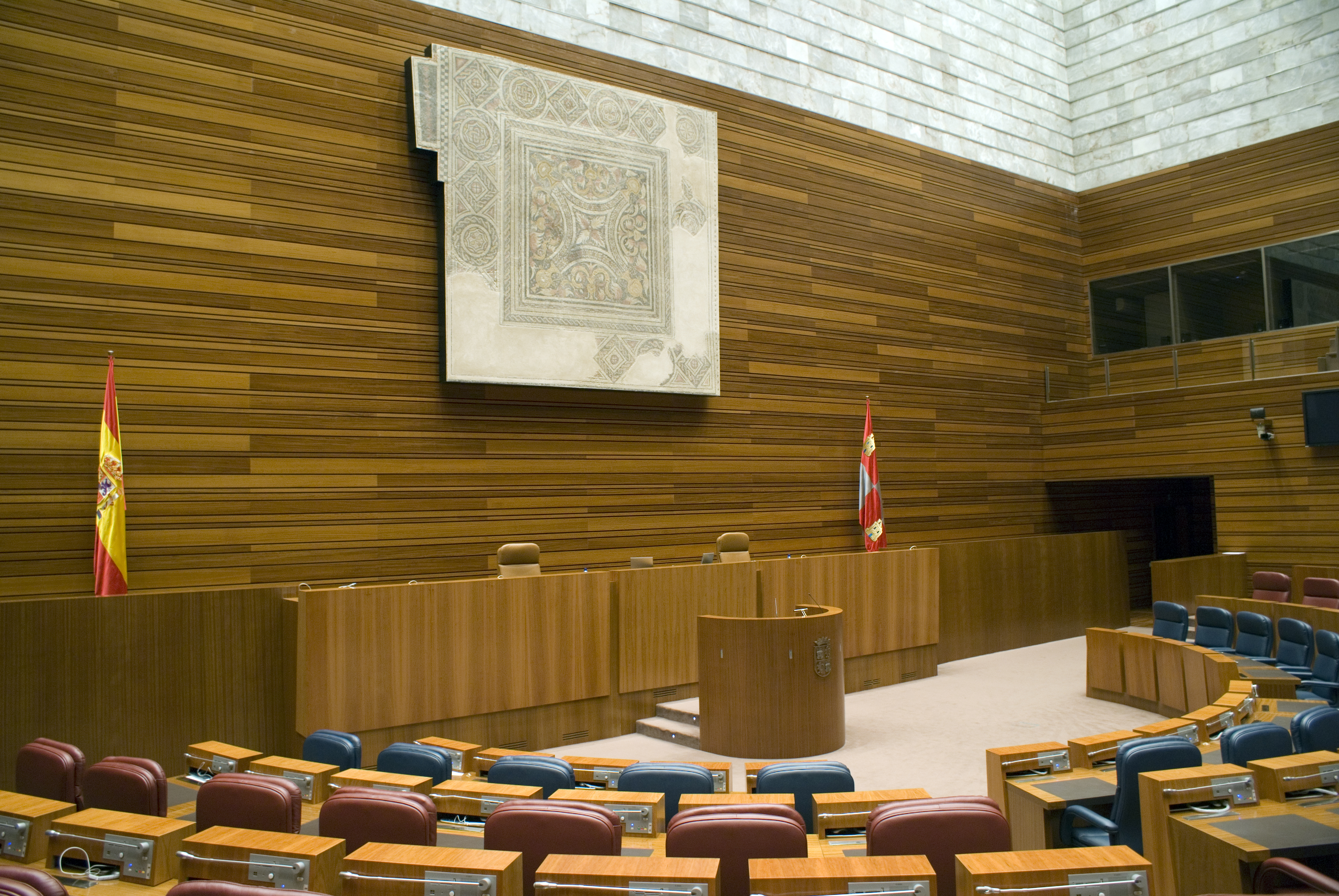
- Seat of the Cortes of Castile and León; Valladolid, Castile and León

Website
- Cortes de Castilla y León

The Cortes of Castile and León (Spanish: Cortes de Castilla y León) is the elected unicameral legislature of the Autonomous Community of Castile and León.

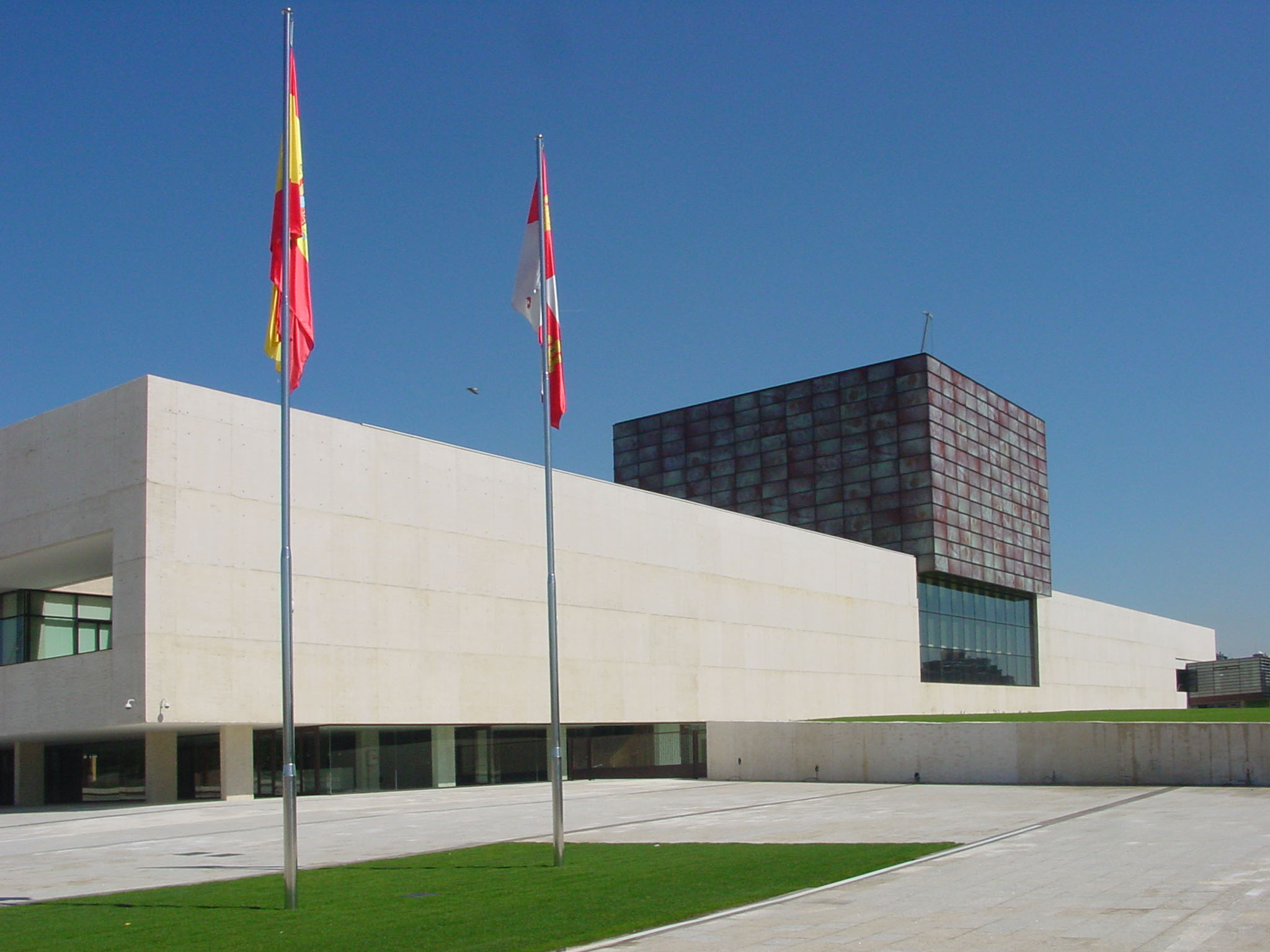
The exterior of the new Cortes building, opened in 2007, in Valladolid.

The tradition of the regional Cortes is traced back to the Royal Council (Latin: Curia Regis) of León (1188). The Curia Regis was a king's summons of the estates of the realm. Although the practical outcome of the Curia Regis of 1188 is still disputed, its charter seems to be an early move towards the rule of constitutional law, much like Magna Carta. The Cortes of Castile and León is seated in the city of Valladolid.

== Membership ==
=== Results of the elections to the Cortes of Castile and León ===
Deputies in the Corts of Castile and León since 1983
Key to parties PSOE AP-PDP-PL CDS PDL PDP AP SI PP IU UPL TC-PNC C’s Podemos Vox XAV EV SY
Election	Distribution	President
1983	42 / 2 / 1 / 39	Demetrio Madrid (PSOE)
1987	32 / 18 / 1 / 32 / 1	José María Aznar (AP)
1991	1 / 35 / 5 / 43	Juan José Lucas (PP)
1995	5 / 27 / 2 / 50	Juan José Lucas (PP)
1999	1 / 1 / 30 / 3 / 48	Juan José Lucas (PP)
2003	32 / 2 / 48	Juan Vicente Herrera (PP)
2007	33 / 2 / 48	Juan Vicente Herrera (PP)
2011	1 / 29 / 1 / 53	Juan Vicente Herrera (PP)
2015	1 / 10 / 25 / 1 / 5 / 42	Juan Vicente Herrera (PP)
2019	2 / 35 / 1 / 12 / 1 / 29 / 1	Alfonso Fernández Mañueco (PP)
2022	1 / 28 / 3 / 3 / 1 / 1 / 31 / 13	Alfonso Fernández Mañueco (PP)
2026	30 / 1 / 3 / 1 / 33 / 14	Alfonso Fernández Mañueco (PP)

== See also ==
- List of presidents of the Cortes of Castile and León
