= Rafael Bardají =

Spanish sociologist

Rafael Bardaji
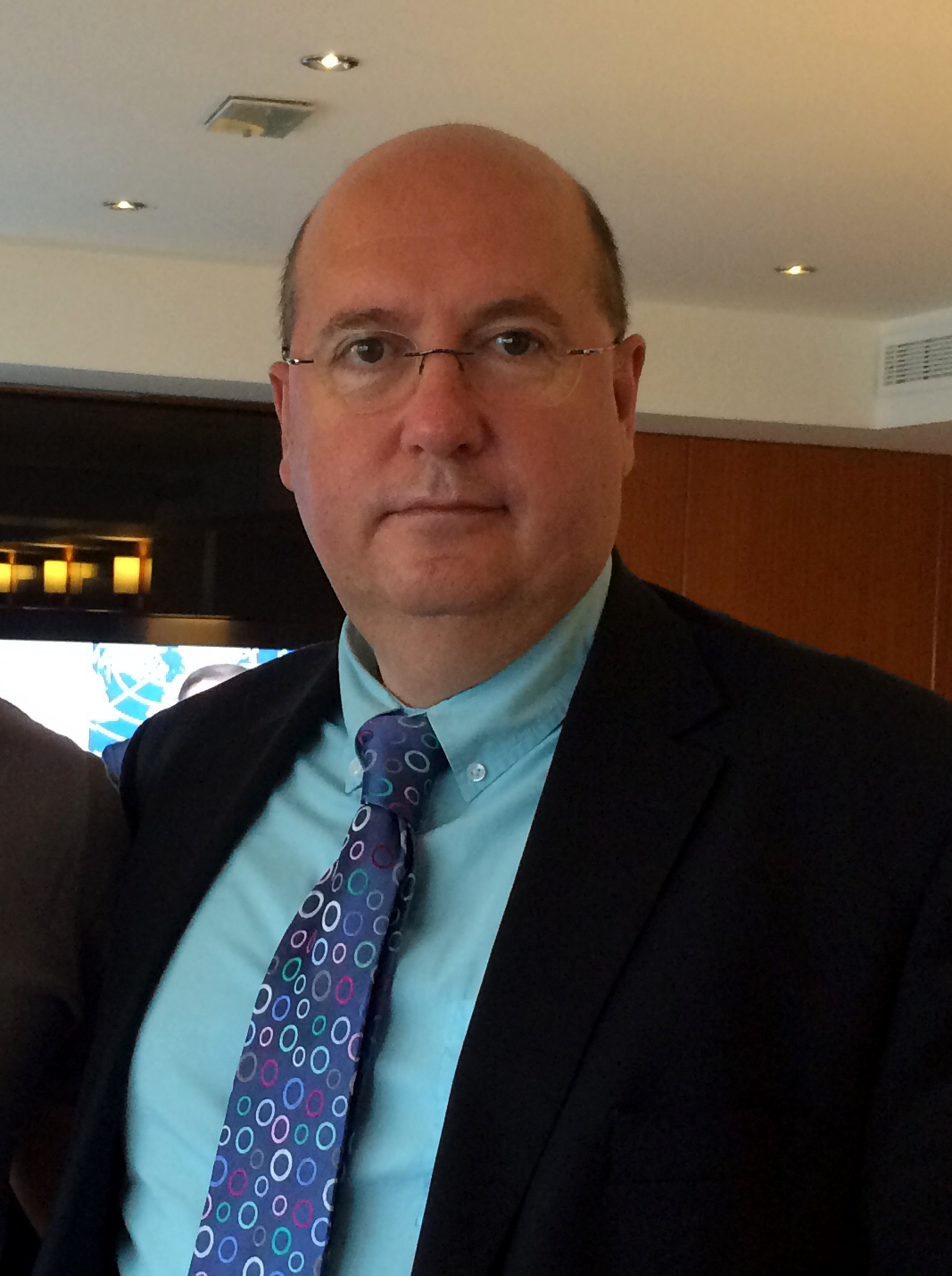
- Born: 1959 (age 66–67); Badajoz, Spain
- Occupations: Author, sociologist, political scientist
- Political party: Vox (2018-); People's Party (before 2018)

Rafael Luis Bardají López (born Badajoz, 1959) is a Spanish author, sociologist and former national security advisor to the Spanish government who researches the fields of neoconservatism and international politics. He was the founder of the Grupo de Estudios Estratégicos (Strategic Studies Group) think-tank.

== Biography ==
Bardaji graduated with degrees in political science and sociology from the Complutense University of Madrid (UCM). He became a researcher into American neoconservative politics under the George W. Bush administration and the 2003 Invasion of Iraq. Along with other academics, military figures and politicians, he founded the centre-right Strategic Studies Group which aims to provide research on defense and security. The group maintains informal ties to the Spanish People's Party. Bardaji also worked as a policy advisor to People's Party defense ministers Eduardo Serra Rexach and Federico Trillo. Bardaji has also written in support of Israel and is a member of the Friends of Israel Initiative in Spain.

In 2018, Bardaji announced he had ended his longstanding affiliation to the People's Party and had joined Vox. Italian journalist Steven Forti argued that Bardaji's role in Vox as being "the main channel that has put the Vox leaders in contact with the American neocon world."

== Views ==
Bardaji has described himself as a Zionist and a supporter of Israel. He is critical of Islam and has argued that Islamic teachings have been responsible for terrorism and that non-violent passages in Islam still encourage intolerance. In 2015, he claimed that contrary to other opinions, Islamic state could not be defined as a typical terrorist outfit as it was a generating support via an apparatus of security and order in comparison to the government of Syria.

== Bibliography ==
- Carmona Pascual, Pablo César (2012). Spanish Neocon: la revuelta neoconservadora en la derecha española (1a edición ed.). Madrid: Traficantes de Sueños. ISBN 978-84-96453-66-1. OCLC 795334955.
- Estefanía, Joaquín (11 July 2004). "Los 'neocons' castizos". El País.
- Garrido, José María (2018). "El asesor que 'amaba' a Chuck Norris y también traicionó al PP". El Plural.
- Lenore, Víctor (9 April 2018). "De Don Pelayo a Darth Vader: el giro pop de la ultraderecha española". El Confidencial.
- Medina, F. (15 Jan 2015). "Pablo Casado, ultraliberal, anticastrista, antiprogresista... y encendido prosionista". El Plural.
- Pardo de Vera, Ana (22 December 2003). "La inteligencia 'mariana'". El Siglo de Europa (583). Archived from the original on 12 April 2018.
- Rodríguez-Puértolas, Julio (2008). Historia de la literatura fascista española. Tres Cantos: Ediciones Akal. ISBN 978-84-460-2930-4.
- Santcovsky, Pablo; Polinelli, Nicola; Sabater, Marta (2008). "Líneas de pensamiento dominante sobre la situación política en Oriente Medio. Una aproximación a cómo cuatro think tanks construyen su discurso" (PDF). Ruta (1).
