= National Architecture Award of Spain =

Architecture prize

- Awarded for: Single architectural work (1932–2000); Architect's body of work (2001–present)
- Sponsored by: Government of Spain
- Country: Spain
- First award: 1932
- Website: www.fomento.gob.es/MFOM/LANG_CASTELLANO/DIRECCIONES_GENERALES/ARQ_VIVIENDA/ARQUITECTURA/PYD/PNA

The National Architecture Award of Spain (Spanish: Premio Nacional de Arquitectura de España) is an honor granted annually by the Government of Spain. It was first given in 1932, had a hiatus during the Civil War, and resumed in 1944, although it is not convened every year.

At its establishment it was awarded to a particular work, but since 2001 it has been awarded to an architect for the whole of their work. In 2004, the National Architecture Award was "recreated", the National Urban Planning Award was restored and, in addition, the National Award for Housing Quality was created, which recognized a specific building, but only those dedicated to housing. The latter has simply been called the National Housing Award since 2009.

In 2013, the National Architecture Award was once again combined into a single prize. The winner is selected by a jury (which nominates a candidate or declares the award will not be given), and the award is granted by order of the Minister of Development.

== Winners ==
=== 1932–2000 ===
Image	Year(s)	Architect(s)	Work	Location	Ref
	1932	Manuel Sánchez Arcas and Eduardo Torroja	Thermal Power Plant of the University City of Madrid	Madrid	
	1933	Fernando García Mercadal	Museum of Modern Art Project	Not built	
	1934	Not given			
	1935	Arturo Sáenz de la Calzada	Project for permanent fine arts exhibition building		
	1936–1943	Not convened			
	1944	Fernando Chueca Goitia	Completion of Almudena Cathedral	Madrid	
	1945	Juan González Cebrián	Architecture of the Spanish Garden		
	1946	Francisco Javier Sáenz de Oiza and Luis Laorga	Project for the Plaza of the Aqueduct of Segovia	Segovia	
	1947	Ricardo Anadón Frutos and Federico Garcia del Villar	Ordination of the Calle de Toledo		
	1948	José Antonio Corrales	Contest for a mountain hermitage in La Mancha		
	1949–1953	Not convened			
	1954	Francisco Javier Sáenz de Oiza and José Luis Romany Aranda	Chapel project in the Camino de Santiago		
	1955	Jorge Oteiza	Chapel proposal in the Camino de Santiago		
	1956	José María García de Paredes and Rafael de la Hoz Arderius	Colegio Mayor Universitario Santo Tomás de Aquino	Madrid	
	1957	Juan Moya Arderíus			
	1958	Pablo Pintado y Riba			
	1959	Carlos Sobrini			
	1960	Javier Barroso Ladrón de Guevara and Ángel Orbe Cano	Residency project for artists in homage to Velázquez		
	1961	Fernando Higueras and Rafael Moneo	Preliminary project of Artistic Restoration Center	Madrid	
	1962	Juan Daniel Fullaondo	Bandstand template project		
	1963	Antonio Fernández Alba	Convento del Rollo	Salamanca	
	1964	Not given			
	1965	Heliodoro Dols and Antonio López García	Monumental plaza	Pedraza, Segovia	
	1966–1967	Not given			
	1968	Fernando Garrido Rodríguez	Algeciras School of Art	Algeciras	
	1969	Jaime López de Asiaín and Ángel Díaz Domínguez	Museo Nacional Centro de Arte Reina Sofía of Madrid (currently dedicated to the Museo del Traje)	Madrid	
	1970	Not given			
	1971	José Manuel López Peláez and Julio Vidaurre Jofre	Central Model for General Basic Education		
	1972–1973	Not given			
	1974	Alejandro de la Sota	University of Seville classroom	Seville	
	1975	José Miguel de Prada Poole	Ice skating rink	Seville	
	1976–1986	Not convened			
	1987	Carlos Ferrater Lambarri	Residences in Calle Bertran, 113	Barcelona	
	1988–1989	Not given			
	1990	Juan Pecourt	PGOU	Torrent, Valencia	
	1991	Not given			
	1992	Carlos Ferrater Lambarri	Hotel Juan Carlos I	Barcelona	
	1993	Antonio Cruz Villalón and Antonio Ortiz García	Sevilla Santa Justa train station	Seville	
	1994	Not given			
	1995	Enric Miralles and Carme Pinós (finalized by Pinós)	Escuela-Hogar	Morella	
	1996	Mariano Bayón	PAD 96		
	1997	Manuel Gallego Jorreto	A Coruña Museum of Fine Arts	A Coruña	
	1998	Not given			
	1999	Manuel de las Casas	Faculty of Health Sciences	A Coruña	
	2000	César Portela	Córdoba Bus Station	Córdoba	

=== 2001–present ===
Year	Winner	Ref
2001	José Antonio Corrales	
2002	Miguel Fisac	
2003	Antonio Fernández Alba	
2004	Matilde Ucelay	
2005	Santiago Calatrava	
2006	Oriol Bohigas	
2007	Not given	
2008	Not given	
2009	Carlos Ferrater Lambarri	
2010	Lluís Clotet	
2011	Not given	
2012	Not given	
2013	Not given	
2014	Juan Navarro Baldeweg	
2015	Rafael Moneo	
2016	José Antonio Martínez Lapeña and Elías Torres	
2017	Not given	
2018	Manuel Gallego Jorreto	
2019	Álvaro Siza Vieira	
