= Enric Ucelay-Da Cal =

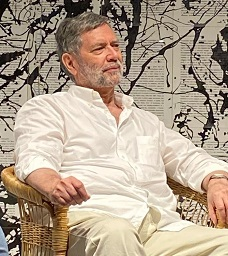
- Born: 1948 (age 77–78)

Academic background
- Education: Bard College; Columbia University; University of Barcelona
- Thesis: Catalan State : Strategies of Separation of Catalan Radical Nationalism and Revolution (1919-1933); El nacionalisme radical català i la resistència a la Dictadura de Primo de Rivera, 1923-1931
- Doctoral advisor: Robert O. Paxton; Edward Malefakis; Josep Fontana

Academic work
- Discipline: history
- Sub-discipline: contemporary history
- Institutions: Autonomous University of Barcelona; Pompeu Fabra University
- Main interests: Catalan history

Enric Ucelay-Da Cal (born 1948 in New York City, United States) is a historian specializing in contemporary history, who has done extensive work on Catalan history. He is at present (2014) Senior Professor Emeritus at the Pompeu Fabra University (UPF) in Barcelona and coordinator of a Research Group on States, Nations and Sovereignties, linked to the UPF.

== Early life and education ==
He is the son of Ernesto Guerra Da Cal and Margarita Ucelay, Spanish exiles from the Spanish Civil War of 1936-1939, and the nephew of Matilde Ucelay. Between 1965 and 1969 he studied at Bard College in New York City (now Bard University), graduated with a BA in 1969 and was awarded a Woodrow Wilson Scholarship. Accepted at the Graduate School of Columbia University in New York City, he studied with Arno Mayer and Robert O. Paxton (with whom he worked briefly as "research assistant "). He completed his Ph.D. in 1979 with a dissertation titled Catalan State : Strategies of Separation of Catalan Radical Nationalism and Revolution (1919-1933) ( Ann Arbor, Michigan, United States: University Microfilms International), a thesis initially directed by Paxton and then by the scholar on Spanish politics Edward Malefakis. This thesis was largely based on systematic interviewing, and the location of Catalan printed materials, as much of the archival sources were still inaccessible in the 1970s.

In 1972 he moved to Spain to research his dissertation. He was soon offered an instructorship at the Autonomous University of Barcelona (UAB), beginning in 1974. As Spanish legislation required citizenship for tenure status, Ucelay-Da Cal somewhat disingenuously maintained his situation as professor by obtaining a degree in Contemporary (i.e. Modern) History at the University of Barcelona in 1980 and, in 1983, a doctorate in history at the UAB with a new thesis, written in Catalan, re-researched and with a slight change of temporal focus, El nacionalisme radical català i la resistència a la Dictadura de Primo de Rivera, 1923-1931, directed by Josep Fontana. To document this new text, Ucelay-Da Cal worked in numerous archives of France, Italy, Belgium, Switzerland, Germany, the United Kingdom, Portugal and of course, Spain, which, because of standard time access clauses (usually fifty years), were previously closed to investigators working on the 1920s. The documentary research did not produce significant changes in the narrative previously established by oral and press sources.

In 1983 he obtained Spanish citizenship, and was granted tenure. Between 1983 and 2021 he was married with Mary Dorsey Boatwright (1947-2021), in her name it was created the Fundació Mary Dorsey per a l'Estudi de la Història Contemporània.

== University teaching ==
Accordingly, between 1983 and 1995, Ucelay-Da Cal was tenured “Titular Professor” of Contemporary history at the Universitat Autònoma de Barcelona. After the corresponding “opposition” or public contest for promotion characteristic of the Spanish University system, he became Senior Professor (“catedrático”) of contemporary history at the same university from 1995 to 2006. Since 2006, he has been senior professor of contemporary history at the Pompeu Fabra University, also in Barcelona. From 2009 to 2013 he participated in the Advanced Grant Project from the European Research Council (ERC) State Building in Latin America, at the UPF. Although he has not been particularly active in teaching abroad, he was “visiting professor " at Duke University between February and April 1994, taught also at Venice International University (Italy) in the spring semester of 2002, and received as " visiting scholar " at the School for Advanced Studies in the Social Sciences (École des Hautes Etudes de Sciences Sociales) in Paris in April 2004.

He directed the dissertations of historians, some whom have since gone on to very distinguished investigatory careers: as examples, one can cite Xavier Casals, who has become unquestionably the major specialist in Neo-Nazism in Spain; David Martinez Fiol, who pioneered research on the impact of the First World War in Catalonia; Joan Maria Thomàs, a top specialist on the Spanish Falange movement; and Joan Esculies, a rising figure among scholars of Catalan nationalism; among others. He has been open to work with researchers younger than himself. For many years, he collaborated closely with Francisco Veiga, the main Spanish researcher on Eastern Europe. More recently, he has also prepared books and projects on politically controversial topics in Catalan history together with Arnau Gonzàlez i Vilalta, a younger Catalan historian specializing in the diplomatic contacts of Catalan nationalism.

== Historical work ==
Ucelay-Da Cal has focused on his career production on the contemporary history of Spain and Catalonia, Spanish nationalism and Catalan nationalism, as well as specific issues such as the role of Catalan independence (the Estat Català movement, in particular) before and during the Second Spanish Republic, as well as during the Spanish Civil War. In broader terms, he has called for greater attention to regional dynamics in the explanation of 'national' history. He has insisted on themes such as the analysis of populism in Spain and its connections or analogies with Latin America. As regards the Spanish Civil War, he has called the use of the anthropology of religion as a means to interpret many trends considered usually as exclusively “political”. He has evinced a strong skepticism regarding many of the suppositions that govern the leading interpretations in contemporary Spanish history.

== Publications ==
Enric Ucelay-Da Cal has published over two hundred articles in academic journals and other history serial publications, as well as in books in Spanish, Catalan, English, French, and Italian. He also reviewed books. Much of his work is available in pdf format on his personal webpage. His major books are:

- 1982: La Catalunya populista: Imatge, cultura i política en l'etapa republicana, 1931-1939. Barcelona: La Magrana (ISBN 8474100925).
- 1984: Francesc Macià. Una vida en imatges. Barcelona: Generalitat de Catalunya (ISBN 8439303467).
- 1985: Macià i el seu temps. Barcelona: Diputació de Barcelona; 2nd edition, 1988 (ISBN 845050774X).
- 1987 (editor): La Joventut a Catalunya al segle XX: materials per a una història. Barcelona, Diputació de Barcelona (ISBN 845055523X).
- 1997: La paz simulada: una historia de la Guerra Fría, 1941-1991, co-authored with Francisco Veiga and Ángel Duarte. Madrid: Alianza Editorial; 2nd edition, 2006 (ISBN 8420648272).
- 2003: El imperialismo catalán. Prat de la Riba, Cambó, D'Ors y la conquista moral de España. Barcelona: Edhasa (ISBN 8435026493.
- 2005: Notícia nova de Catalunya: consideracions crítiques sobre la historiografia catalana als cinquanta anys de Notícia de Catalunya de Jaume Vicens i Vives, co-directed with Josep Maria Fradera. Barcelona, Centre de Cultura Contemporània de Barcelona (ISBN 8496103935).
- 2012: Contra Companys 1936: Contra Companys. La frustración nacionalista ante la Revolución, co-edited with Arnau González Vilalta. València, Publicacions de la Universitat de València (ISBN 978-84-370-8818-1).
- 2014: 6 d'Octubre. La desfeta de la revolució catalanista de 1934, co-edited with Arnau González i Vilalta and Manel López. Barcelona, Editorial Base, (ISBN 978-84-16166-19-0).
- 2015: Macià al país dels soviets, with Joan Esculies. Barcelona: Edicions de 1984 (ISBN 978-84-15835-68-4).
- 2017: Joan Lluhí i Vallescà. L'home que va portar la República, with Arnau González i Vilalta. Barcelona: Editorial Base (ISBN 978-84-16587-55-1).
- 2017: El proceso separatista en Cataluña. Análisis de un pasado reciente (2006-2017), co-edited with Steven Forti and Arnau González i Vilalta. Granada: Editorial Comares (ISBN 978-84-9045-560-9).
- 2017: "Tumulto". Meditacions sobre l'octubre català (2017), with Arnau González i Vilalta and Plàcid Garcia.Planas. Maçanet de la Selva: Editorial Gregal (ISBN 978-84-17082-38-3).
- 2018: El catalanisme davant del feixisme, 1919-2018, co-edited with Arnau González i Vilalta and Xosé Manoel Núñez Seixas. Maçanet de la Selva: Editorial Gregal (ISBN 978-84-17082-73-4).
- 2018: Breve historia del separatismo catalán. Barcelona: Ediciones B (ISBN 978-84-666-6511-7).
- 2019: L'aparença d'un poder propi. La mancomunitat de Catalunya i el catalanisme, co-edited with Arnau González i Vilalta and Josep Pich Mitjana. Catarroja-Barcelona, Editorial Afers (ISBN 978-84-16260-77-5).
- 2020: Patrias diversas, ¿misma lucha? Alianzas transnacionalistas en el mundo de entreguerras (1912-1939), co-edited with Xosé M. Núñez Seixas and Arnau González i Vilalta. Barcelona, Ediciones Bellaterra (ISBN 978-84- 7290-990-8).
- 2022: El Mediterrani Català (1931-1939), un inèdit contemporani, co-directed with Enric Ucelay-Da Cal, Susanna Tavera, Àngel Duarte i David Martínez Fiol, edited by Arnau González i Vilalta. Maçanet de la Selva, Editorial Aledis (ISBN 978-84-124555-2-6).
- 2023: El Fascio de las Ramblas, Los orígenes catalanes del fascismo español, with Xavier Casals Meseguer. Barcelona, Pasado y Presente (ISBN 978-84-125954-6-8).
- 2024: La Cataluña populista. Imagen, cultura y política en la etapa republicana (1931-1939). Madrid, Taurus (ISBN 978-84-306-2652-6).
