= Shakira as a feminist icon =

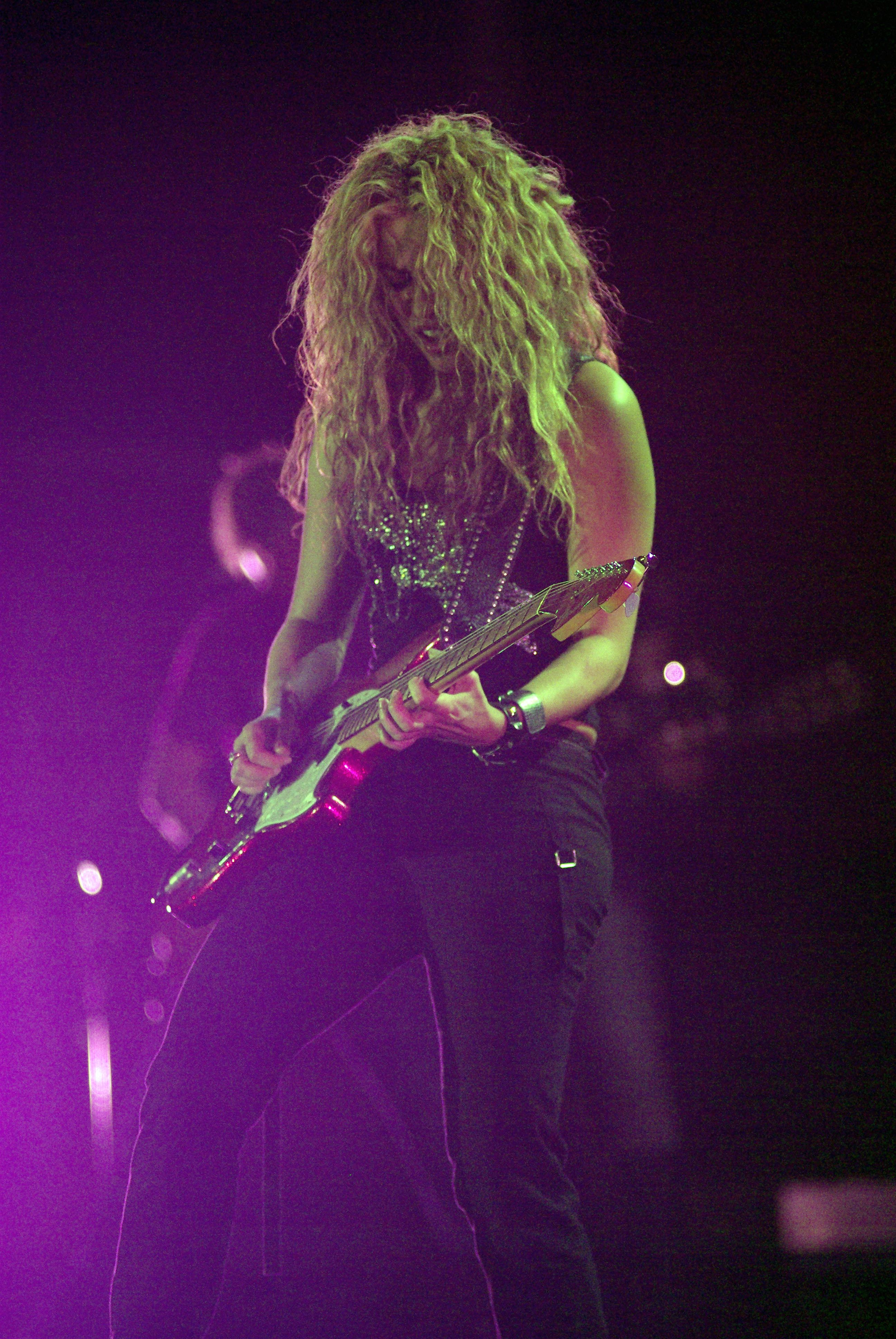
Shakira with a guitar performing her song "Inevitable"

The Colombian singer Shakira throughout her career has been considered a feminist symbol and a representation of (Latin) women globally. Since the beginning of her career, several magazines highlighted her appearance in the audiovisual medium with a "unique" style of a young female artist, differentiating herself from other Latin artists. Currently the lyrics of her songs (especially about heartbreak) are analyzed by experts.

Shakira aroused the total interest of various sectors that debated about her record material with her lyrics and symbolism. In addition, according to Carolina Maldonado she is "inspiration for a whole generation of Latin women" who trust more and more in themselves as artists than to depend on looks. According to Rolling Stone magazine, she has been hailed as a woman who "broke barriers and brought back female Latin pop rock music from the 90s," bringing several women into the genre.

Shakira around her more than 30 years of musical career has achieved various successes for a Latina woman such as: The Latina with the most sales of all time, the most famous Latina in the world and the "most influential Latina artist in the history" of music. Being described by VH1 as the "greatest Latin artist in the history of music"

== Context ==
"I consider myself a feminist, it matters a lot to me that girls enjoy the same opportunities and education as boys, because inequality starts very early, especially in some parts of the world where many girls do not attend school and then it is very difficult for them to overcome those inequalities to take charge of their lives. It is incredible that in 2020 we are still fighting for half of the population to enjoy the same rights. We have to progress much faster."

— Shakira, Marie Claire

Shakira expressed in the interviews of her album "Oral Fixation Vol 2" that she did not feel part of the feminist movement, adding that she did not want to wear that poster, according to her words, she feels a lot about her feminine side, but that somehow she has come closer to the side masculine of her life, especially in her relationships.

Years later during the interviews for her album She Wolf (2009) she declared that growing up made her realize as a woman the struggle that she faces every day with the difficulty that women have to satisfy themselves in a world where men are in charge. "We live in a society that represses dreams from the subconscious of women... You know, women have to make enormous efforts in life, much greater than men." Currently, Shakira's feminist position is focused on seeking equality in education and work for women and men, as well as seeking progress in the world with the same rights for both men and women. During an interview, Shakira quoted the ex-secretary of the United States Madeleine Albright saying "There is a place reserved in hell for those women who do not support others" expressing her full support for this phrase.

== Analysis ==
During the last months, Shakira's work has been the subject of analysis by journalists, critics, experts among others who analyzed some of her songs, managing to relate strongly to Shakira with the ideal of the feminist woman. Some of her songs like "She Wolf" have been analyzed the lyrics and the meaning of these, being in "She Wolf" according to Shock magazine "...it was a quite controversial song in its time" while according to Shakira "this song represents the woman of this time, the man of the present and the gays of now". The song expresses openly the desire that "la loba" has to satisfy her sexual desires" While in the song "Se Quiere, Se Mata" the writer Ita María Díez reviews the lyrics of the song stating that "... it is a song that denounces the risks to which the prohibition of abortion exposes us; the danger of not being able to decide over our own bodies and lives; the double standards of societies that prefer to see us dead rather than free and the shameless way in which the criminalization of abortion only punishes women".

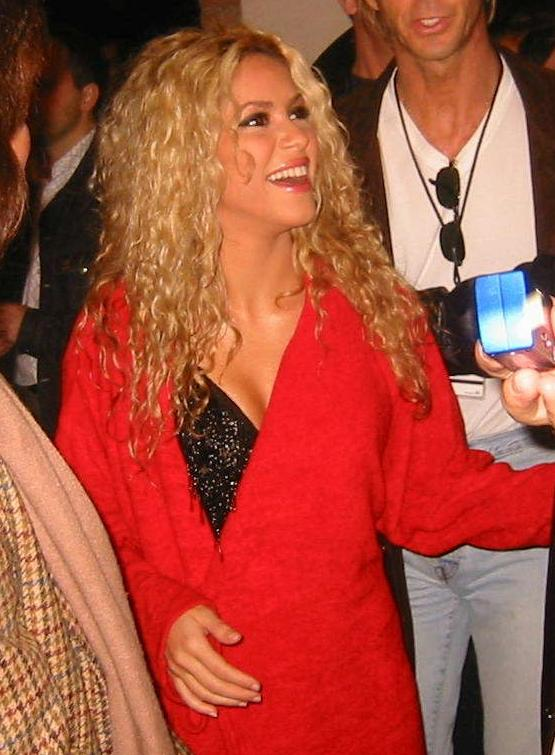
During the year 2001 Shakira presented an "alter ego" that represented the independent woman.

The specialist Mercedes Ortega wrote a book called "Todos me miran. América Latina y el Caribe desde los Estudios de género" which contains a chapter entitled "Shakira as gender technology: representations of feminine identity" where she identifies several images of Shakira, including "the girl with bare feet", the romantic lover, the femme fatale and the sex symbol. She sees to what extent they are built within gender norms and in what way it subverts them." Billboard magazine in 2016 made its top 5 "feminine power anthems" present in her bilingual album "Laundry Service" where they acclaim her "alter ego" presented as an independent woman fitting perfectly with her empowering songs like "Objection ( Tango)", "Te Dejo Madrid", "Ready for the good times", "Poem to a Horse" and "Rules" where she presents herself as a woman who is not "tied to toxic relationships"

In the year 2023 after the separation with her ex-partner Gerard Piqué Shakira released her song together with Bizarrap called "Out of your league" which immediately caught the attention of the media, immediately the song had a strong impact on the world generating controversy and reactions divided in the public but enjoying the acclaim of specialized critics, According to the newspaper El Plural expresses that Shakira "raises her voice, refuses the role of statism and submission assigned to women in the macho ideology, and cries out in defense of her self-esteem and her self-esteem" A CNN op-ed by author and communications specialist Ximena N. Beltran Quan Kiu felt that Shakira's lyrics were welcomely raw about all the things that were hurting her or keeping her up at night, including the cheating in which the new girlfriend was complicit, and her insecurity compared to younger women; Beltran Quan Kiu did note that among the popular responses were social media users "questioning whether Shakira broke an unwritten rule between women by dragging her ex's new flame". The song was also analyzed from a psychological point of view, reviewing the complete lyrics and reaching the conclusion that "She conveys that she is very hurt by the breakup, not only from the point of view of sadness and anger, which are two emotions that she expresses very well, but also tries to show it through her public figure, her songs" El Tiempo reported that, after a week of release, it was part of a study at the National Autonomous University of Mexico as a subject of analysis by gender studies experts. Educators are studying symbolism in its lyrics from the point of view of gender violence.

== Critics ==
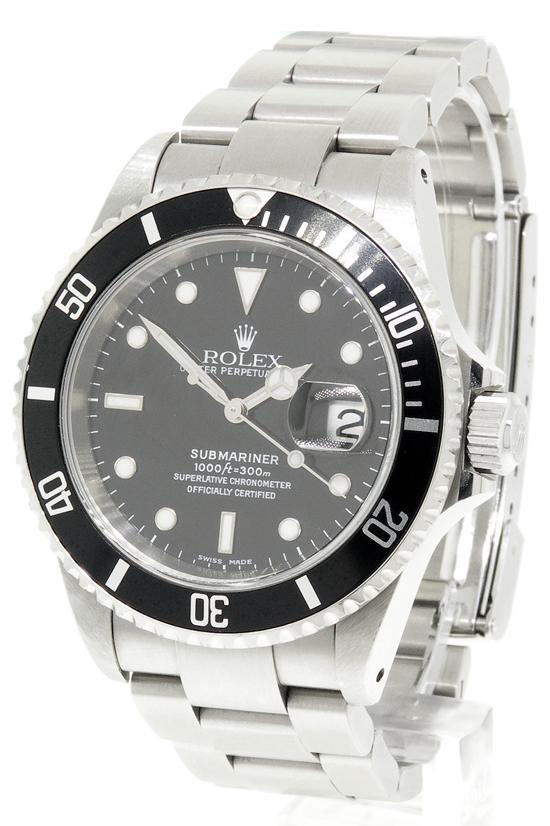
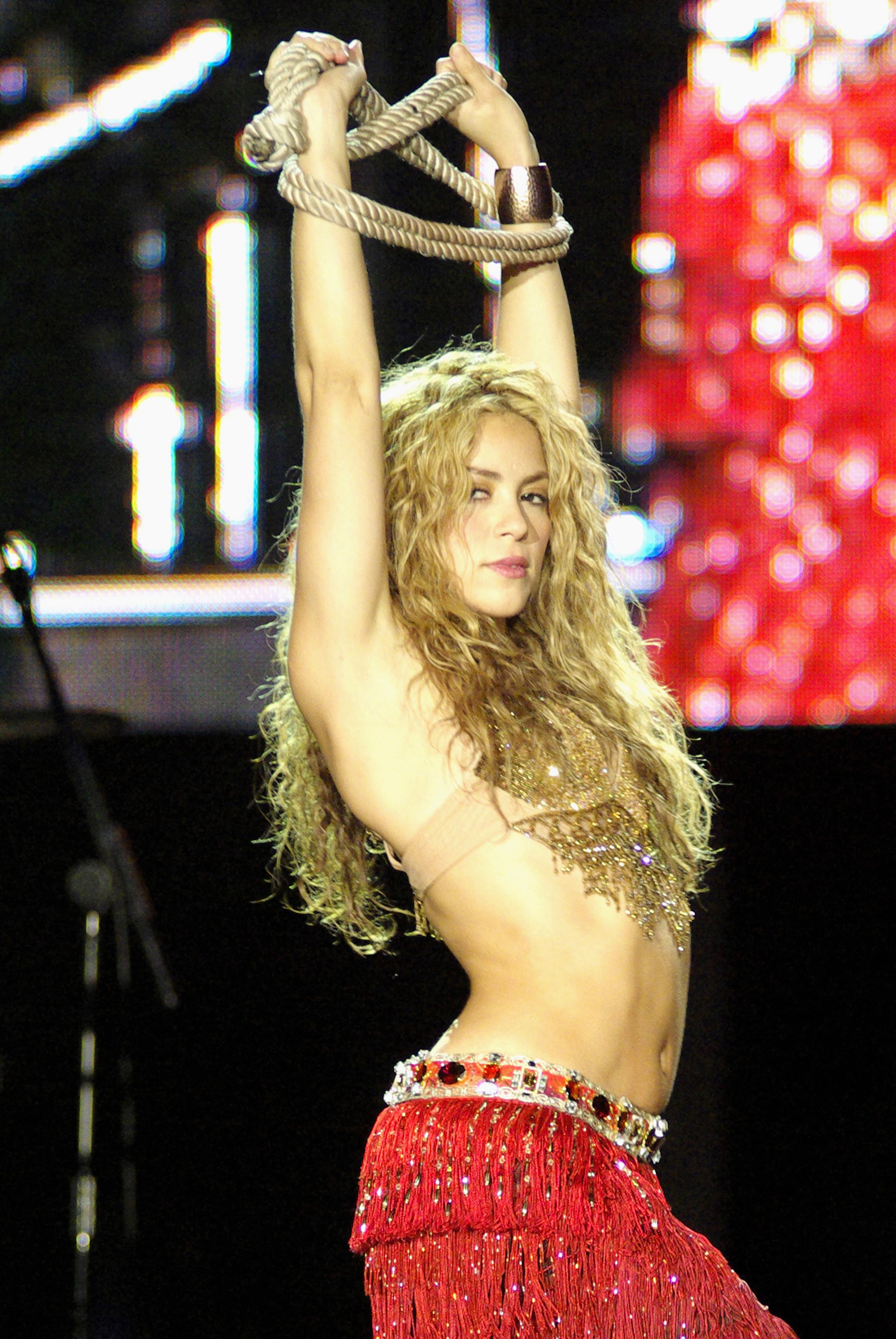
Shakira's objectification compared to a Rolex aroused discomfort in some feminists.

Shakira's image of an empowered woman was largely debated by feminists who questioned her position regarding the problem that occurred in their relationship, according to some magazines "Rivalry between women and competition for a man's "love" is promoted by the patriarchal culture. Questioning this is one of the tasks, among others, of the women's movement. Before there was talk of sorority, but it turns out that patriarchy is strengthened when women compete among themselves for a man. There is a media operation that is developing this edge of the song, and some sectors of feminism echo it, confusing it with empowerment".

Maghrebi feminist Noor Ammar Lamarty called Shakira's attitude "childish" stating "Shakira objectifies and objectifies herself by denigrating her ex's new partner under the phrase 'change a Rolex for a Casio'. We are human not objects. No There is nothing empowering in using curiosity to be mean and macho with another woman because it takes your place. You have to know how to leave".

University of Cambridge lecturer Dr Maya Feile Tomes wrote a letter published in The Guardian, criticizing how the song espoused a feminist message but was "disappointingly sexist" by the way it demeans and judges the new girlfriend in the lyrics, something Feile Tomes felt was unnecessary.

== Legacy ==
According to Billboard, various female artists were hit by the song &quot;Out of your league&quot;; triggering a wave of reactions on social networks <ref>Flores, Griselda (12 January 2023). "'What a Queen': Artists React to Shakira's Hard-Hitting Bizarrap Music Session". Billboard.</ref>

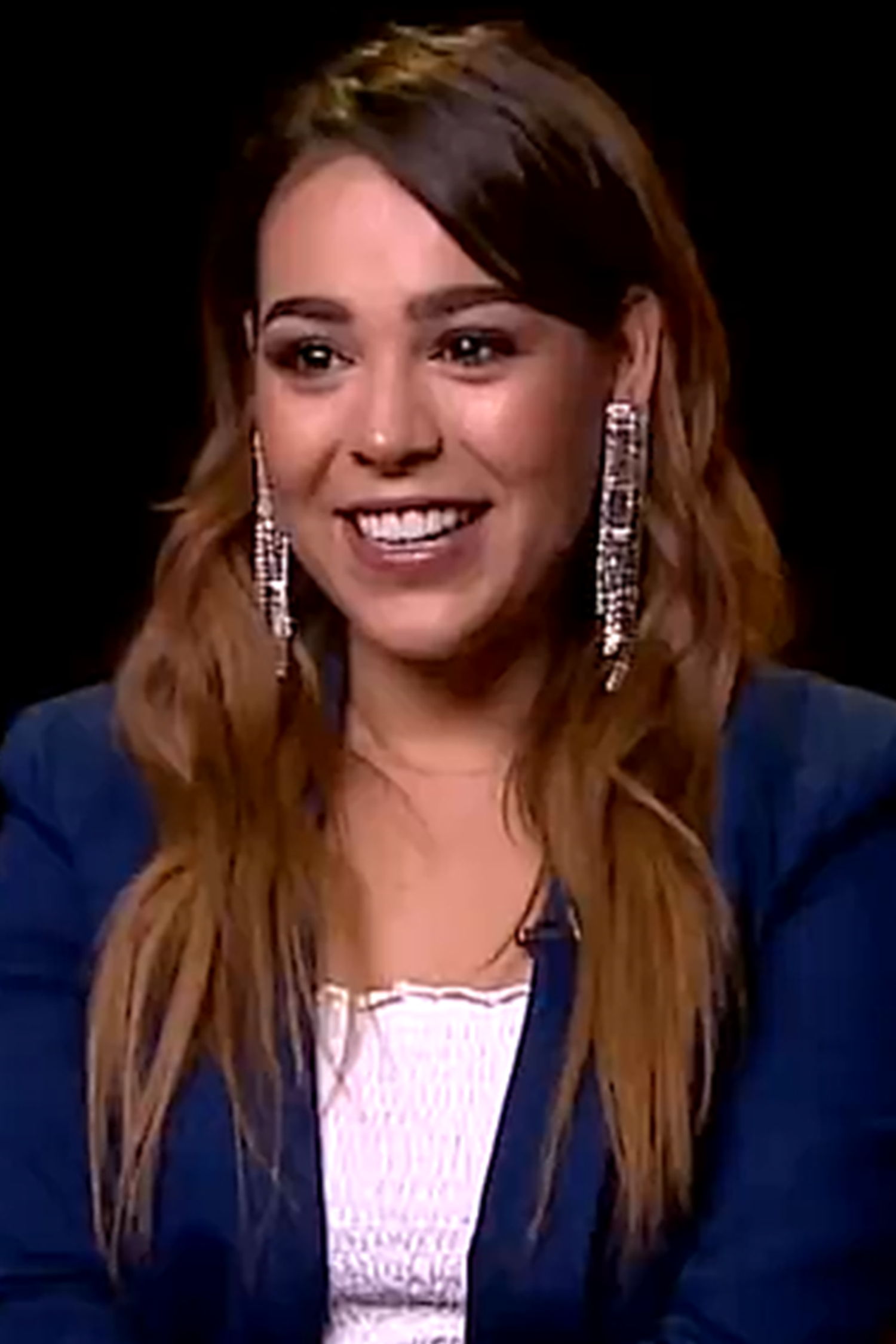

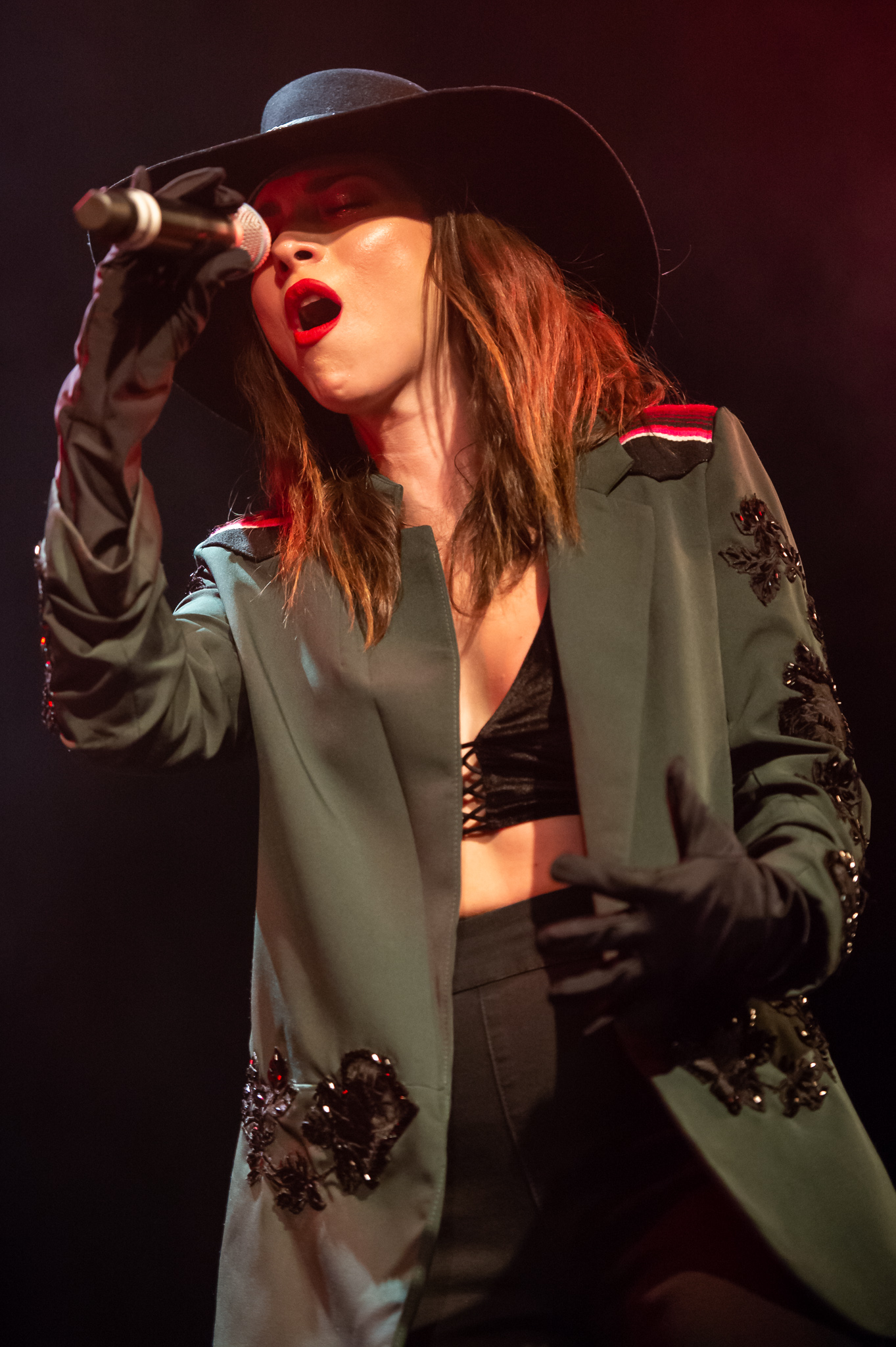

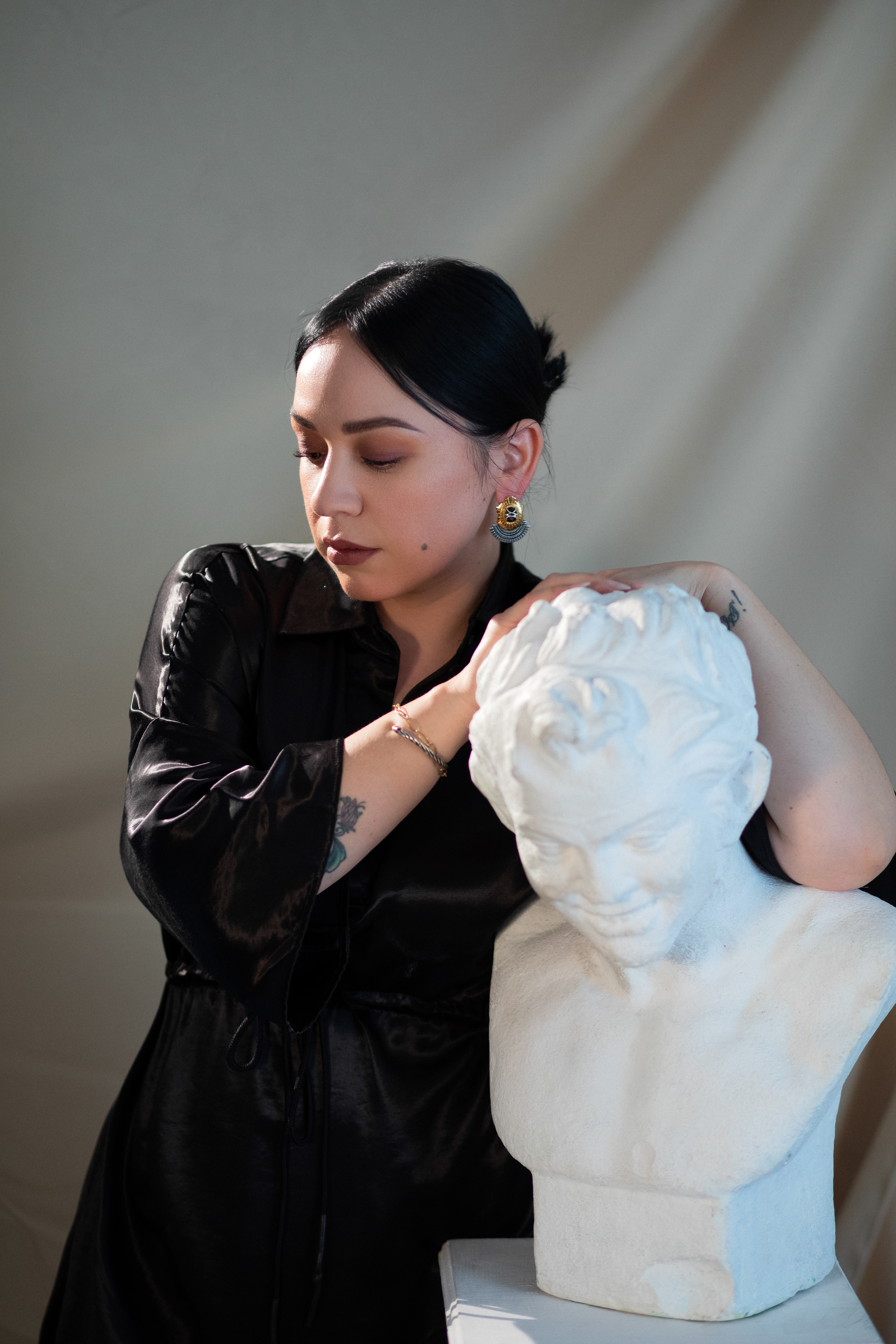

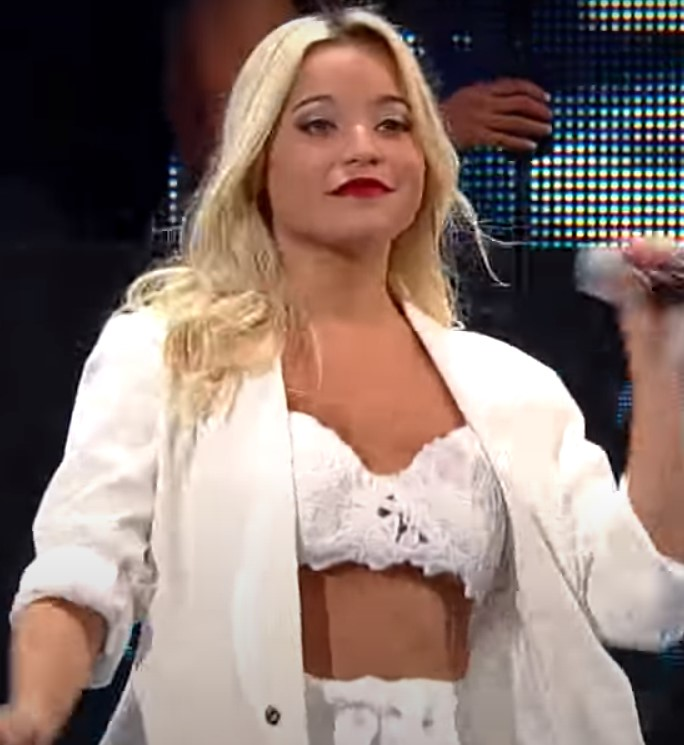

All of us as Latinas have to recognize she’s the one who represents us as Latinas around the world. When I was on set shooting the video and I was watching her, I was realizing all the amazing and legendary moments in her career, and a lot of things I need to work on to get to that point. But it was such a blessing to have her.

— Karol G, 2023'

Since Shakira's debut in the music market she was described as a musical phenomenon and a spokesperson for the especially female youth who identified with her, the Latino generation of the nineties "embraced" her presented style of being irreverent against the established norms of what a young woman should be and the way she should look, according to Edgar García in the book "Shakira ¡Que viva Colombia! " Shakira had reached a status of importance among Latina adolescents, her way of dressing was widely imitated by girls and adolescents from various Latin countries, Shakira represented all young women in her way of thinking and speaking in front of the world. Shakira from the beginning was seen as an artist who inspires Latina women to be proud of their roots, she managed to break down several barriers against the Latino community and facilitated the famous "crossover" to the mainstream market. Shakira is coveted to have broken the gender barriers in the Latin music industry which is considered to be "historically male-dominated" and passed their numbers. A fact that helps girls like her to have the same opportunities as her. According to the professor at the National University of La Plata, Patricia Larrús,

“Shakira is the ultimate Woman in Music. Thanks to her, Latin women all over the world have been empowered to write and perform deeply personal music. She created a movement all on her own, and continues to be more relevant than ever today, with grace, a deep tradition of giving back, and enormous talent. She is the definition of a Woman in Music,”

— Leila Cobo, 2023'

Shakira continues to break patriarchal stereotypes while being a "mirror issue" for the entire Latino female community, also calling Shakira as an emerging from a whole group of those women who do not achieve so much visibility, but that they add to this current by opting for a freer life, without conditioning and with other objectives, adding that "Shakira's image is contradictory: disruptive and hegemonic. Shakira's productions set trends, open paths, they copy or modify patterns that regulate the conduct of women. A 2021 survey conducted by LATFEM, a Latin American feminist organization concluded that Shakira is the most influential female artist among Latin Americas females, Also, Shakira's 4th studio album, Donde Estan Los Ladrones has come out as the most influential album within the surveyed population. Mexican journalist, Natalia Szendro said, "...many girls were directly influenced by Shakira and I am that generation, in which I felt identified for the first time with someone at that level." The survey also adds, "with age comes the recognition and it becomes very easy to see the legacy and the deep impact that "Shaki" has left." According to the journalist Sebastian Peña with "Dónde Están los Ladrones?" the singer was also credited with opening new doors for women in the industry and showing people that she could become a "superhero" to both men and women despite the fact that the artists always had them in the background, he also added that thanks to this album, Shakira managed to give greater strength and visibility to the international female boom at the end of the first millennium.

During the march on 8 March, 2023, former minister Izkia Siches declared that Shakira had "led the march" while a British journalist commented that there were Shakira masks selling very well, various posters with phrases from Shakira songs such as "She Wolf" and "Out of your league", while the latter was played with several girls singing it throughout the day. However, in Spain, the treasury would have fined all the women who carried posters with Shakira's phrases during the march.

== See also ==
- Cultural impact of Shakira
- Fashion of Shakira
- Shakira fandom
- Analysis of Shakira's musical work
