= José María Aznar =

Prime Minister of Spain from 1996 to 2004

The Most Excellent José María Aznar
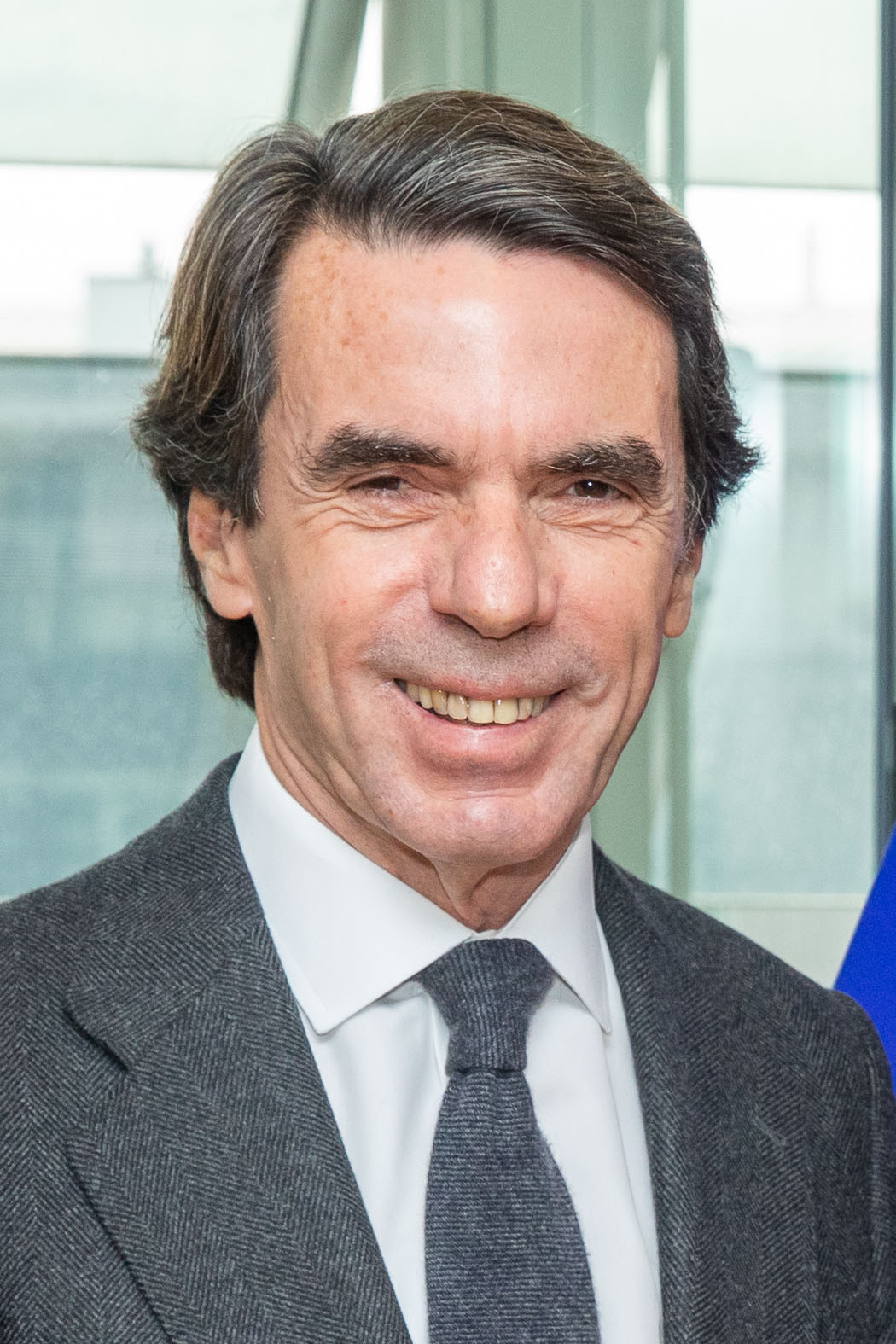
- Aznar in 2020

Prime Minister of Spain
- In office 5 May 1996 – 17 April 2004
- Monarch: Juan Carlos I
- Deputy: First Deputy; Francisco Álvarez-Cascos; Mariano Rajoy; Rodrigo Rato; Second Deputy; Rodrigo Rato; Javier Arenas
- Preceded by: Felipe González
- Succeeded by: José Luis Rodríguez Zapatero

President of the People's Party
- In office 1 April 1990 – 2 October 2004
- Secretary-General: Francisco Álvarez-Cascos; Javier Arenas; Mariano Rajoy
- Preceded by: Manuel Fraga
- Succeeded by: Mariano Rajoy

Leader of the Opposition
- In office 21 November 1989 – 4 May 1996
- Monarch: Juan Carlos I
- Prime Minister: Felipe González
- Preceded by: Manuel Fraga
- Succeeded by: Felipe González
Other offices held
President of the Junta of Castile and León
In office 27 July 1987 – 16 September 1989
Preceded by	José Constantino Nalda
Succeeded by	Jesús Posada
Member of the Congress of Deputies
In office 21 November 1989 – 15 January 2004
Constituency	Madrid
In office 18 November 1982 – 7 July 1987
Constituency	Ávila
Member of the Cortes of Castile and León
In office 10 June 1987 – 16 September 1989
Constituency	Ávila

Personal details
- Born: José María Aznar López; 25 February 1953 (age 73) Madrid, Spain
- Party: People's (since 1989)
- Other political affiliations: Frente de Estudiantes Sindicalistas (1970s); People's Alliance (1979–1989)
- Spouse: Ana Botella (m. 1977)
- Children: 3
- Education: Complutense University of Madrid

José María Aznar López (Spanish pronunciation: [xoˈse maˈɾi.a aθˈnaɾ ˈlopeθ]; born 25 February 1953) is a Spanish politician who served as Prime Minister of Spain from 1996 to 2004. He led the People's Party (PP), the dominant centre-right political party in Spain.

In his teens, he joined the Frente de Estudiantes Sindicalistas, a dissident Falangist student organisation. He studied law at the Complutense University of Madrid and first worked in the public sector as an Inspector of the Finances of the State (Spanish: Inspector de las Finanzas del Estado). He joined the People's Alliance, which was re-founded as the People's Party in 1989. He led the Junta of Castile and León from 1987 to 1989 and was Leader of the Opposition at the national level from 1989 to 1996. In 1995, he survived an assassination attempt from the Basque separatist group ETA.

The People's Party, led by Aznar, won the most parliamentary seats at the 1996 general election, but he failed to obtain a majority in the Congress of Deputies, which forced the PP to seek the support of Basque (EAJ-PNV), Catalan (CiU) and Canarian (CC) regionalists. He was finally sworn in as prime minister on 5 May 1996, and his first term was marked by market liberalization, deregulation of the economy, cutting of state expenses and privatization of several state-owned companies. During his first term, the economy grew and Spain met the criteria to participate in the creation of the eurozone, but unemployment remained moderately high. Some relevant events in Aznar's first term were the assassination of PP politician Miguel Ángel Blanco by ETA. Aznar attempted to negotiate with ETA between 1998 and 1999, but the parties did not reach an agreement and violence continued.

Aznar also got the most votes in the 2000 general election this time obtaining an absolute majority of 183 deputies (out of 350) in the Congress. The economy kept growing and unemployment finally began to fall during his second term. In foreign policy, Spain adopted a neoconservative approach and grew closer ties with the United States and the Bush administration, in the aftermath of the September 11 attacks. Aznar supported the American-led invasions of Afghanistan and Iraq. In 2002, he faced harsh criticisms for the government's response to the Prestige oil spill in Galicia. Support of the PP further declined after the invasion of Iraq, which was not supported by the majority of the Spanish population, but was nevertheless carried out with Spanish support for the U.S. and the UK. A 2003 poll conducted by the public research institute CIS found that 91% of Spaniards were against the invasion of Iraq.

In 2004, a general election in Spain was scheduled for 14 March, which was not contested by Aznar, but by his successor as lead of the PP, Mariano Rajoy. On 11 March, the 2004 Madrid train bombings occurred, which killed 192 people. The government claimed the bombings were perpetrated by ETA. In the few days between the bombings and the election, the PP defended this position: however, a major sector of the population rejected the hypothesis that the attacks were perpetrated by ETA and believed the government was lying because of the bombings' possible connection to Spanish support for the invasion of Iraq. This led to a massive drop in support for the PP in the days before the election, and the opposing PSOE's José Luis Rodríguez Zapatero won the election.

Aznar remains active in the private sector, and he sometimes gives his views on current issues. He was a member of the Council of State from 2005 to 2006. He is the president of Spanish think tank FAES and is a director of News Corp. He held the honorary (symbolic) presidency of the PP until 2016, when he renounced the title. On February 14, 2024, Aznar resigned from his position as a lobbyist for Philip Morris.

== Early life ==
Aznar was born in Madrid in 1953, the son of Manuel Aznar Acedo, an army official, journalist and radio broadcaster, and the grandson of Manuel Aznar Zubigaray, a former Basque nationalist broadcaster who later became a Falangist propagandist and a prominent journalist during the Franco era. Both his father and grandfather held governmental positions during the dictatorship.

He was educated at the Colegio del Pilar in Madrid. As a sixteen-year-old, Aznar espoused an independent brand of Falangism as a member of the Frente de Estudiantes Sindicalistas (FES), a Falangist dissident student organization opposed to the Francoist regime. Primordially a university organization, a teenage Aznar became responsible for the high-school branch set up in the late 1960s, and was tasked with promoting Falangism amongst Spain’s school-going youth along the organisation’s lines. (Note: After 1977 the FES would become the Falange Española Independiente (FEI).)

Aznar graduated in law at the Complutense University of Madrid in 1975 and became a Tax Authority inspector in 1976.

== Politician in People's Alliance ==
After the death of Francisco Franco and the restoration of democracy, Aznar joined the Alianza Popular (AP) in January 1979, a few months after his wife. In March he became the Secretary General of the party in La Rioja, occupying the post until 1980. In February 1981 he joined the AP's National executive committee. He became Assistant Secretary General in February 1982.

On 26 October 1982 he was elected to parliament, representing Ávila. On 22 June 1985 he was appointed to the presidency of the AP in Castile and León. On 2 December 1986 AP leader Manuel Fraga resigned following fierce internal party fighting in the aftermath of another failure to dislodge the ruling Spanish Socialist Workers' Party (PSOE). Aznar was not considered senior enough to be a possible successor, and gave his support to Miguel Herrero de Miñón, who lost the leadership bid to Fraga's choice, Antonio Hernández Mancha. As a result, Aznar lost his post as Assistant Secretary General.

On 10 June 1987, after having resigned to his seat in the Congress of Deputies, he was elected member of the Cortes of Castile and León in the 1987 Castilian-Leonese regional election, representing Ávila. Soon after, he was invested as president of the region, forming an uneasy coalition government with the Democratic and Social Centre (CDS).

== Leader of the Opposition ==
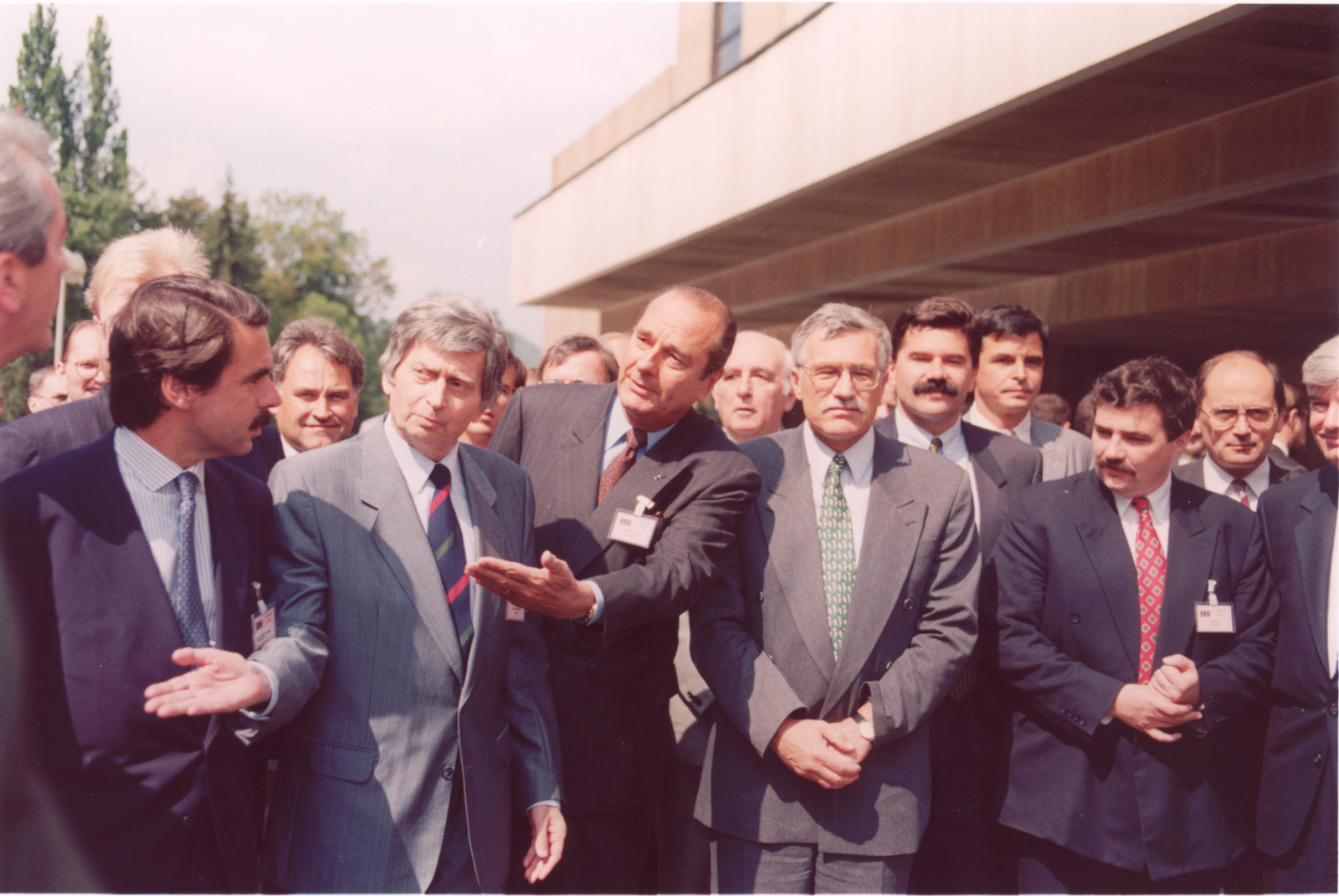
Hungarian Prime Minister József Antall, Aznar, Jacques Chirac (Mayor of Paris) and Czech Prime Minister Václav Klaus in 1993.

In 1989 Aznar was voted by the National Executive Committee of AP to be the new leader of the party, re-founded as the Partido Popular (People's Party, or PP). With Fraga focused on the presidency of Galicia, Aznar was confirmed as leader of the PP at their 10th National Congress at the end of March 1990. In November the PP moved from the Conservative group in the European Parliament to the more centrist Christian Democratic European People's Party.

On 6 June 1993 the PP again lost the general election, but improved on their previous performance by obtaining 34.8% of the vote. The PSOE lost its absolute majority and needed to form a coalition government with other parties in order to continue governing. The result was a disappointment for the PP as the opinion polls had predicted a victory for them. They did well in the 1994 European and 1995 local elections.

On 19 April 1995, Aznar's armored car prevented him from being assassinated by an ETA bomb.

The PP won the 3 March 1996 general election with 37.6% of the vote, thus ending 13 years of PSOE rule. With 156 of the 350 seats (the PSOE won 141) Aznar had to reach agreements with two regional nationalist parties, Convergence and Unity (Catalan) and the Canary Islands Coalition, in order to govern with additional support from the Basque Nationalist Party. He was voted in as prime minister with 181 votes in the Cortes Generales on 4 May and sworn in the next day by King Juan Carlos I.

== Premiership ==
=== First term (1996–2000) ===
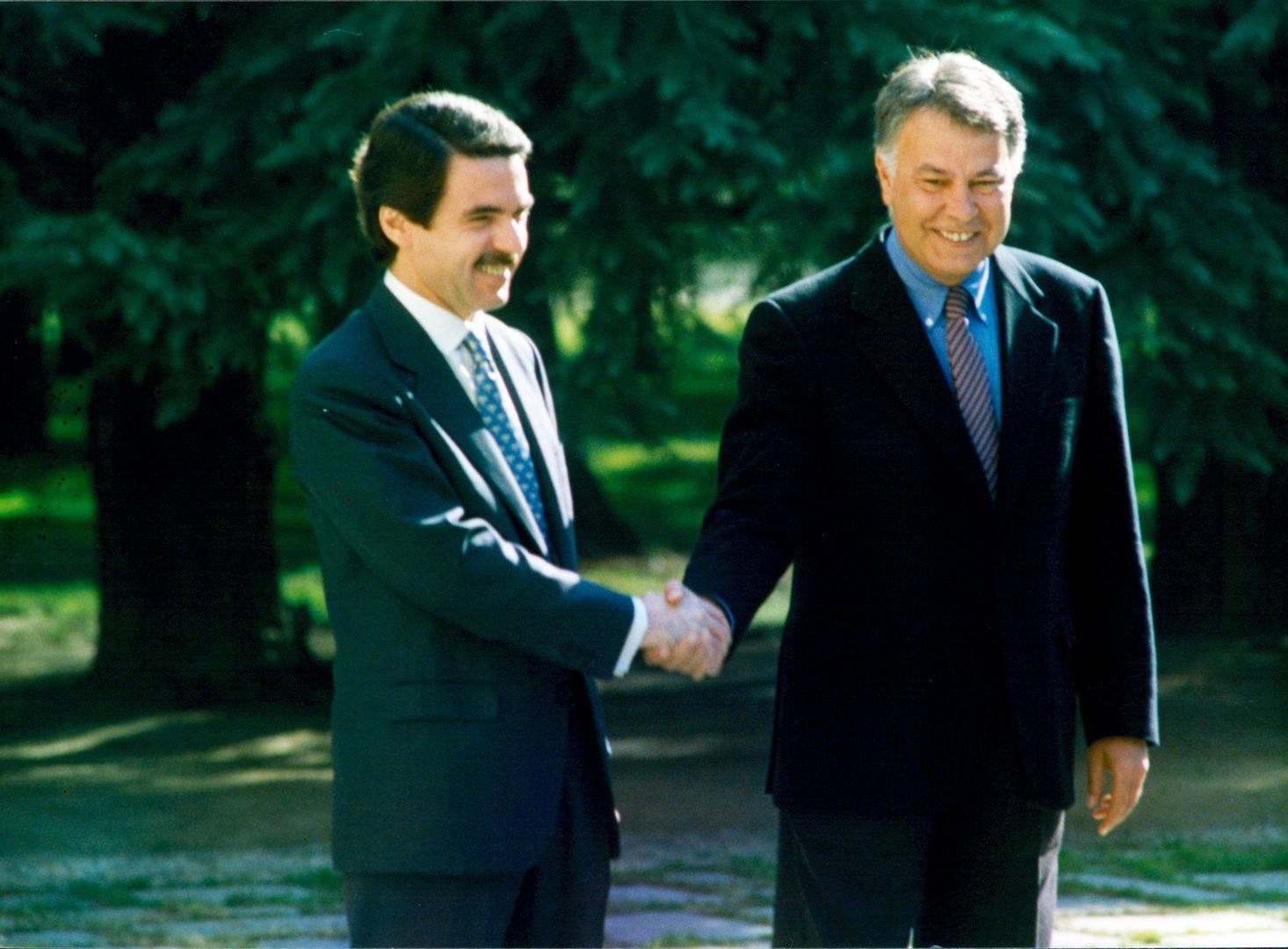
Felipe González, acting President of the Government, receives José María Aznar after the 1996 Spanish general election, prior to his appointment as President of the Government of Spain

Aznar's government has been described as the first conservative government since 1983, or since the death of Francisco Franco.

The Aznar Government maintained the commitment of the previous government to join the European Union's single currency and showed itself willing to take political risks in order to meet the requirements for membership. Aznar also announced the sale early in 1997 of the nation's remaining minority stake (golden shares) in the Telefónica telecommunications company and the petroleum group Repsol. This marked the beginning of a period of privatizations after the previous PSOE government had nationalized parts of the economy.

During the Premiership of José María Aznar, Spain gave residency to more than 500,000 undocumented migrants in different amnesties in 1996, 2000 and 2001.

=== Second term (2000–2004) ===
Spanish voters reelected Aznar in the 2000 general election with an outright majority. The PP obtained 44.5% of the vote and 183 seats. The Spanish electorate's participation was the lowest for a general election in Spain in the post-Franco era.

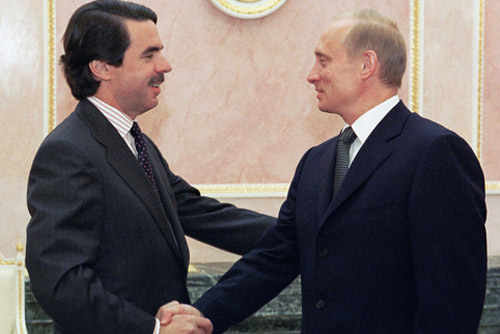
Aznar meets with Russian President Vladimir Putin

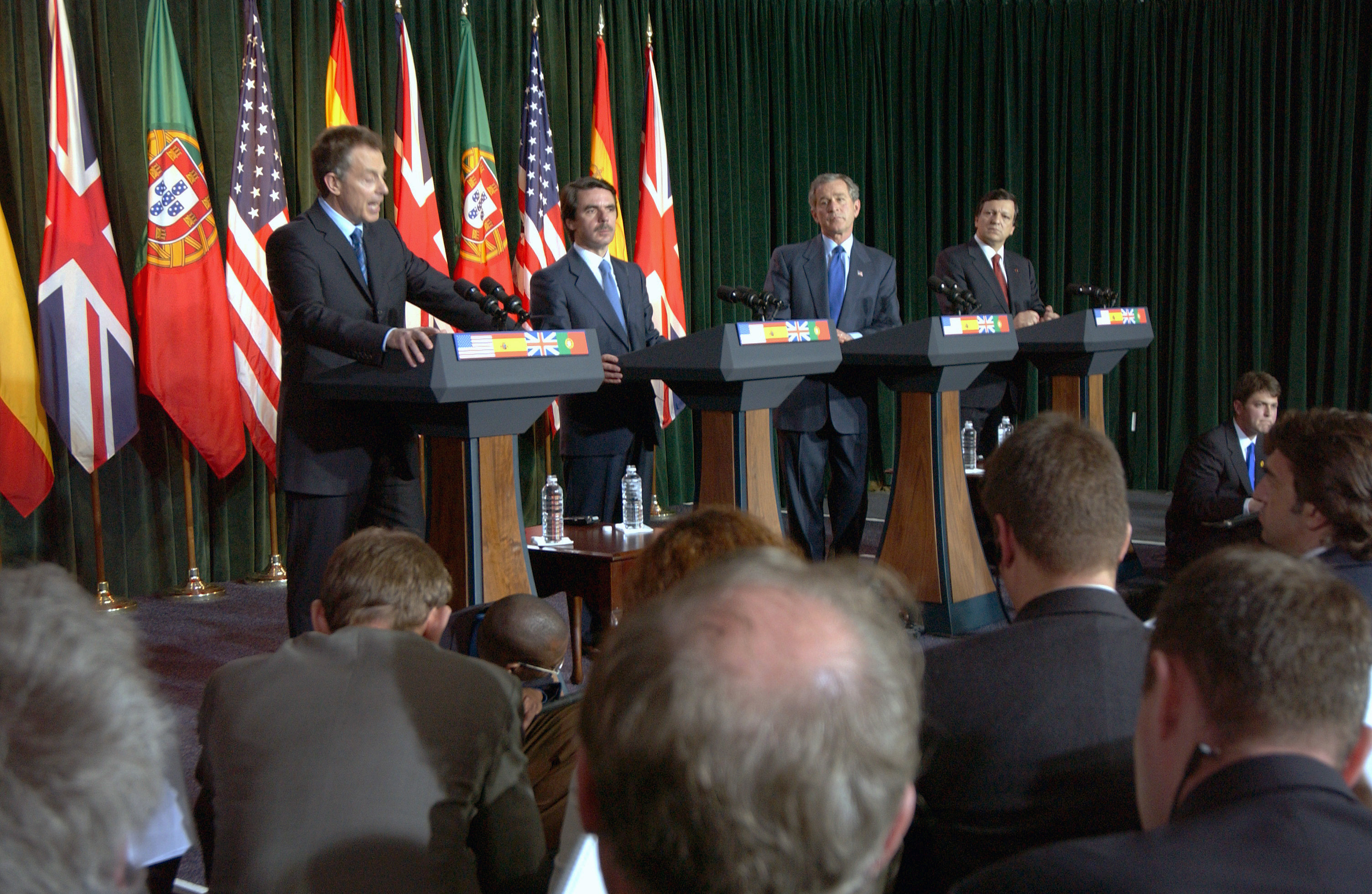
Barroso, Blair, Bush, and Aznar in the Azores, March 2003

After six years of relative political calm, when political debate was dominated by a consensus within the ruling party on economics, regional nationalism, and terrorism, several issues arose which polarized Spanish public opinion. Like UK Prime Minister Tony Blair, Aznar actively supported the United States' war on terrorism, despite public opposition. Aznar met with Bush in a private meeting before the 2003 invasion of Iraq to discuss the situation in the UN Security Council. El País leaked a partial transcript of the meeting. The government's handling of the wreckage of the Greek Prestige tanker near the Spanish coast, which resulted in a major ecological disaster, also became a divisive issue.

He actively encouraged and supported the Bush administration's foreign policy and the US invasion of Iraq in 2003. He defended it on the basis of secret intelligence allegedly containing evidence of the Iraqi government's nuclear proliferation. On 30 January 2003, Aznar signed The letter of the eight supporting US. policy on Iraq. The majority of the Spanish population, including some PP members, were against the war. Spain's major cities were the scene of the largest street demonstrations ever seen in the country as a result of the government's participation in the invasion. Aznar lost some support from those who had voted for the PP in 2000. On a live TV interview aired on the public station while demonstrations were taking place in the streets, he asked the Spanish people to take his word assuring there were weapons of mass destruction in Iraq, of which he had evidence. This is now regarded as incorrect.

On the economic front, the government pursued the privatization of public enterprises and focused its attention on debt reduction. Investment in research was drastically reduced, and large cuts were also made in social spending. Social housing construction fell by over 30%, and households went into debt in response to the sharp rise in the price of building land.

In January 2004 Aznar called a general election and designated his successor as candidate, Mariano Rajoy, sticking to a pledge of not seeking office for a third term. Despite political tensions, polls suggested that the People's Party was set to win a third consecutive election on the strength of the economy. An opinion poll carried out by the government-run CIS (which had estimated that 92% of the Spanish people did not support the War in Iraq) in February 2004 estimated that the PP would win an election with 42.2% of the vote while the PSOE would only get 35.5%.

=== Madrid train bombings and end of term ===
Three days before the 2004 general election, 10 bombs killed 191 people in the 11 March 2004 Madrid train bombings. Initially, the government and the opposition stated publicly that it was possible the bombings may have been the work of ETA. However, the PP government continued to blame ETA even after evidence that the attacks may have been the work of an Islamist group emerged, having the minister of foreign affairs, Ana Palacio, instruct all Spanish diplomats to place the blame on ETA at every opportunity. The public perception that the government hid information from the general population gave rise to a public outcry. Two days after the Atocha bombings, demonstrations took place across Spain demanding news from the investigation, where chants such as "We want the truth before we vote" and "Who is responsible?" were heard.

Three days after the train bombings, the opposition PSOE won the elections. The subsequent investigations held by a Parliamentary Committee were characterized by bitter partisan exchanges between the different political parties, with dispute over who may have been responsible for the bombings. Aznar appeared before the Committee in November 2004 and declared his belief that the authors of the bombings were not to be found "in faraway deserts or remote mountains." Aznar said in 2006 that he thought that the attacks were not exclusively perpetrated by Islamists.

== After 2004 ==
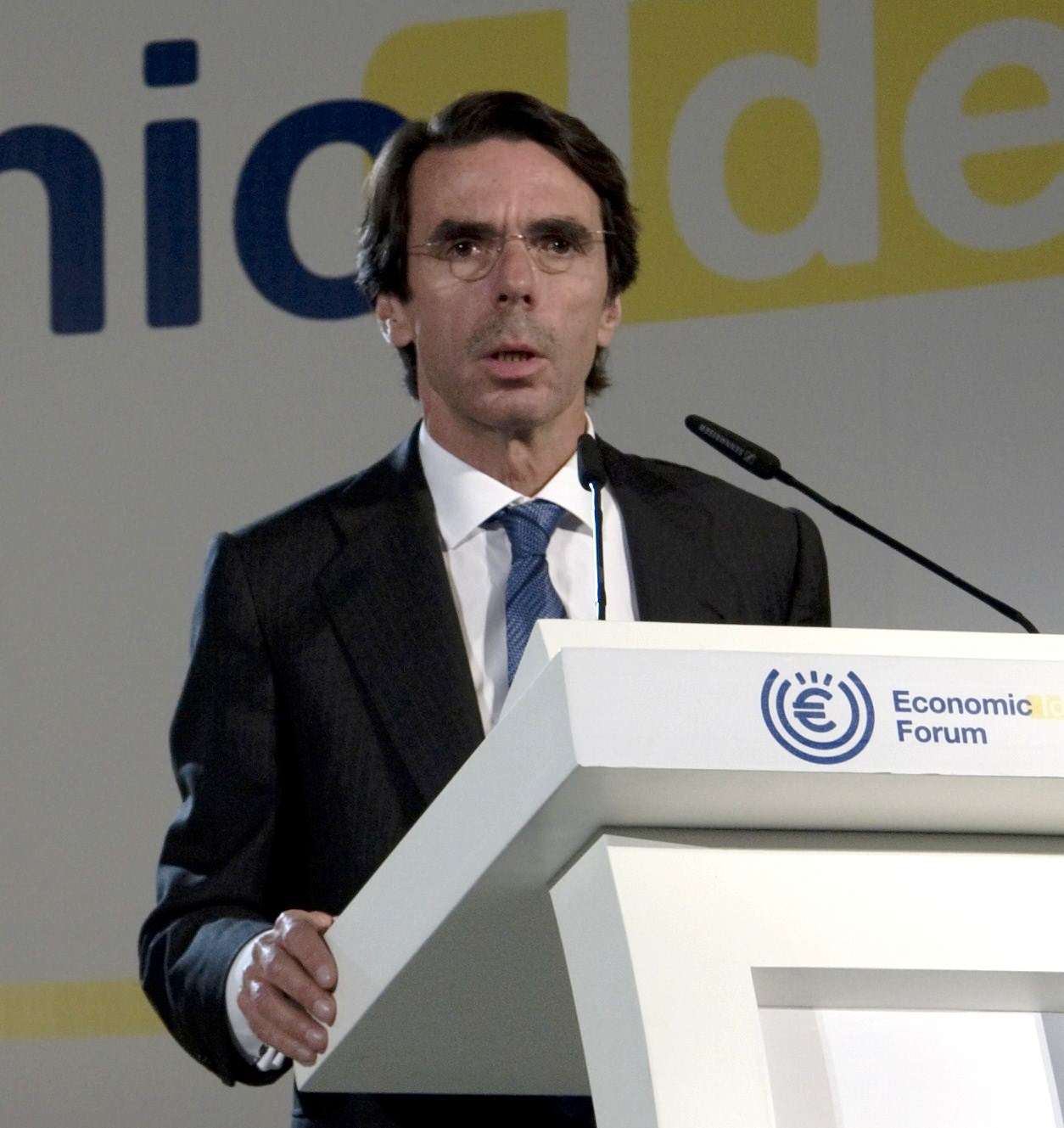
Aznar addressing the Martens Centre Economic Ideas Forum in 2010

After leaving office on 17 April 2004 he presided over the FAES think tank, which is associated with the PP. After a 2005 reform, promoted by Prime Minister Rodríguez Zapatero, former prime ministers were admitted into the Council of State, a position from which he later resigned.

Aznar was appointed Distinguished Scholar in the Practice of Global Leadership at Georgetown University in Washington, D.C. in April 2004. In this position, he teaches two seminars per semester on contemporary European politics and trans-Atlantic relationships in the Edmund A. Walsh School of Foreign Service. Additionally, he teaches a course on political leadership, convened by Professor Carol Lancaster, with former Polish President Kwasniewski. Aznar leads public dialogues on pressing contemporary concerns in collaboration with other members of the faculty; he was awarded an honorary degree at Universidad Francisco Marroquin.

In 2007, Aznar was appointed to the advisory board of Centaurus Capital, a London-based hedge fund, an appointment which proved to be short-lived. In 2006, he was appointed to the Board of Directors of News Corporation, the media conglomerate of Rupert Murdoch. He is also member of the European Advisory Panel of The European Business Awards and the European Council on Tolerance and Reconciliation.

Aznar is a member of the Club de Madrid, an independent non-profit organization created to promote democracy and change in the international community, composed by more than 100 members: former democratic Heads of State and Government from around the world.

Aznar was also one of the signatories and promoters of the Prague Charter.

Aznar was awarded an Honorary Doctorate from CEU Cardinal Herrera University.

Since 2013, Aznar has served on the Leadership Council for Concordia, a nonpartisan, nonprofit based in New York City focused on promoting effective public-private collaboration to create a more prosperous and sustainable future, and is a member of the Board of Directors of Afiniti, a US based artificial intelligence business.

He received the America Award of the Italy-USA Foundation in 2019.

In 2022, his cumulative salary since he began advising Rupert Murdoch in 2006 exceeded $4 million.

== Political positions ==
=== Environmental issues ===
In October 2008, on the occasion of a visit by the Czech President Václav Klaus to the Spanish capital, Aznar said that anthropogenic climate change is a "scientifically questionable" theory which had become a religion, and whose followers were "enemies of freedom". These views were similar to those expressed by Klaus in his book Blue Planet in Green Shackles, which was published in Spanish by FAES. Aznar's speech caused some puzzlement, as his government had been a signatory to the Kyoto Protocol in 1998, and it appeared that he had subsequently changed his mind about climate change. In 2009 Aznar was due to speak to a Heartland Institute conference, which was billed as the "world's largest-ever gathering of global warming skeptics". He withdrew at short notice, and in the absence of a public explanation there was speculation that he did so in order to spare his party embarrassment. The People's Party distanced itself from the environmental views of Aznar, classing him among a "sceptical minority" within its membership. However, some People's Party politicians favored Aznar and wanted a public debate on climate change, most notably Esperanza Aguirre.

In 2010 it was reported that Aznar would chair the Advisory Council of the Global Adaptation Institute, a new body concerned with adaptation to climate change.

=== Foreign policy ===
==== Israel ====
In 2010, Aznar founded the Friends of Israel Initiative, with the stated goal to "counter the attempts to delegitimize the State of Israel and its right to live in peace within safe and defensible borders". Referring to the ill-fated takeover of the Mavi Marmara by Israeli commandos, Aznar said in 2010 that the world must support Israel because "if it goes down, we all go down". He said that "In an ideal world, the assault by Israeli commandos on the Mavi Marmara would not have ended up with nine dead and a score wounded. In an ideal world, the soldiers would have been peacefully welcomed on to the ship."

He criticized Turkey for placing Israel "in an impossible situation" in which it would have to either give up its security or face world condemnation. Aznar concluded that Israel is the West's first line of defense, and must be protected. In 2014, in an address at the British House of Commons Aznar said Israel is needed by the European Union. He said his report recommends that due to its Western culture and the benefits it brings the European Union, Israel should become a full member of the EU without pre-conditions.

== Controversy ==
Aznar's government posthumously granted a medal of Civil Merit to Melitón Manzanas, the head of the secret police in San Sebastián and the first high-profile member of the Francoist government killed by ETA in 1968. Manzanas was widely considered a torturer, and Amnesty International condemned the award.

After the 2004 elections it was revealed that Aznar and his government secretly channeled public funds to a United States legal firm to lobby for the bestowment of the Congressional Gold Medal on Aznar. The contract consisted in a first payment of US$700,000 for the first seven months, followed by $100,000 monthly payments until it reached the sum of $2 million.

In an interview with BBC World on 27 July 2006 he voiced doubts about Islamists being the sole culprits of the disputed 2004 Madrid train bombings, "You know in this moment some perpetrators of the attacks, but you do not know who imagined the attack, who is the leader of the attack, who is the idea (sic) of the attack, who established and supported means for the attacks, who defined the logistics of the attacks, who established the strategies of the attack. Nothing...I think that one part of the perpetrators are Islamists, but I think that this is not only an Islamist attack."

During a Washington, D.C. conference at the Hudson Institute, a conservative U.S. think tank, on 23 September 2006, referring to Pope Benedict XVI's comments on Islam and violence, Aznar asked why Muslims had not apologized for occupying Spain for 800 years as Al-Andalus. He then called the Alliance of Civilizations initiative "stupid." His reference to apologies was a response to the demonstrations asking the Pope to apologize. One PP official clarified Aznar's speech by saying the prime minister thought it is pointless to apologize for historical events.

The American magazine Foreign Policy ranks him among the "five worst ex-presidents of the world" for his post-presidency behavior. According to the magazine, Aznar distinguished himself by his "extreme rhetoric" for his negationist positions on the issue of global warming, his rejection of the efforts of inter-religious dialogue or for having declared that the election of an African-American to the presidency of the United States would lead to a "foreseeable economic disaster".

=== Accusations of corruption ===
In 2015, after a series of cases spread over several years, 11 of the 14 members of José María Aznar's government from 2002 to 2003 were imprisoned or prosecuted for influence peddling, money laundering and tax fraud. Aznar himself is suspected by the Spanish justice system of having benefited from a party slush fund between 1990 and 1996 for an amount of 782,695 euros.

He was summoned by the courts in March 2021 to explain the 'B fund' that the PP had allegedly maintained for more than twenty years. This was allegedly used to receive anonymous donations from business leaders in order to pay "salary supplements" to party officials.

== Personal life ==
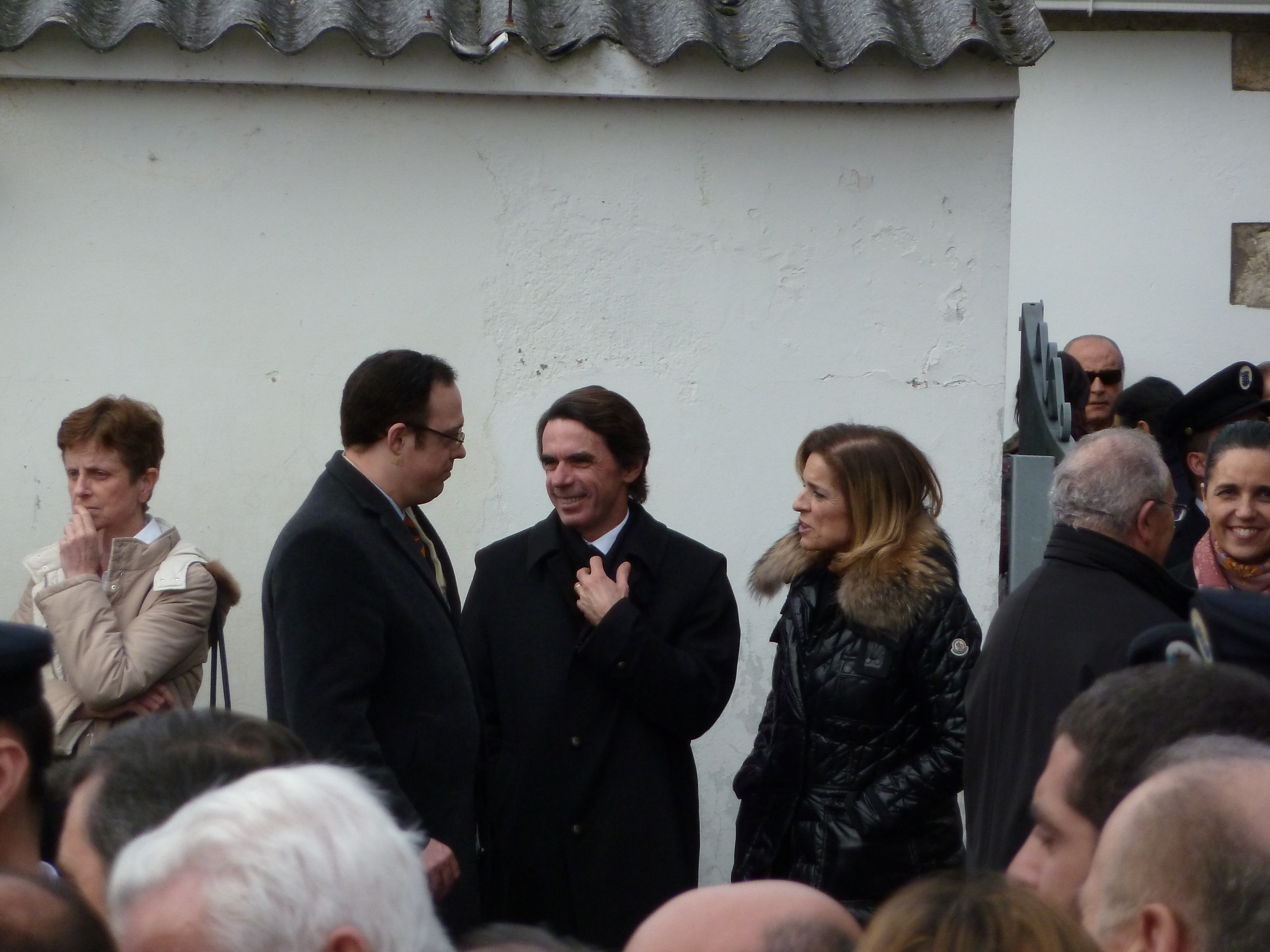
Aznar and Botella during the burial of Manuel Fraga in 2012.

In 1977 Aznar married Ana Botella, by whom he has three children: José María, Ana and Alonso. Their daughter married Alejandro Agag at El Escorial on 5 September 2002, and they have four children.

In 2008 in response to rumours, Aznar denied being the father of Zohra Dati, daughter of Rachida Dati, the then French minister for justice. Dati subsequently claimed that another individual, Dominique Desseigne, was the father of her child.

In December 2012, a French court ordered Desseigne to undergo a paternity test to see if he fathered Dati's child. A French court decision of 7 January 2016 ruled that Desseigne was indeed the father.

== Ancestry ==
Ancestors of José María Aznar

8. Gerónimo Benigno Aznar Guerendiain
4. Manuel Aznar y Zubigaray
9. Toribia Ignacia Zubigaray Iturría
2. Manuel Aznar y Acedo
10. Isidro Gómez Acedo y Moreno
5. María de las Mercedes Gómez Acedo y Villanueva
11. Serafina Villanueva Ortiz
1. José María Alfredo Aznar y López
12. Anselmo López Maroto
6. Facundo López Valdivieso
13. Rufina Valdivieso Crespo
3. Elvira López y Valdivieso
14. Francisco Panadero Pablos
7. Victoria Vicenta Panadero Sedano
15. María Sedano Pérez

== Books ==
- Libertad y solidaridad (1991)
- La España en que yo creo (1995)
- España: la segunda transición (1995)
- Ocho años de Gobierno (2004)
- Retratos y perfiles: de Fraga a Bush (2005)
- Cartas a un joven español (2007)
- España puede salir de la crisis (2009)
- Memorias I (2012)

== Conferences ==
- Latin America: An Agenda of Liberty, conference by José María Aznar at Francisco Marroquin University. Guatemala, November 2007"Conference by José María Aznar" (Language: Spanish)

== Awards and honors ==
- Collar of the Order of Isabella the Catholic (19 April 2004).
- Grand Cross of the Order of Prince Henry (23 August 1996).
- Grand Cross of the Order of Merit of the Republic of Poland (2003)
- Honorary Doctorate, Florida International University (1998).
- Honorary doctorate from the Catholic University of Sacred Heart of Milan (18 January 2007).
- Honorary Doctorate by the Peruvian University of Applied Sciences (2 October 2008).
- Honorary Doctorate, University of Santiago de Chile (5 October 2008).
- Honorary Doctorate by the Universidad Francisco Marroquin in Guatemala (11 November 2008).
- Honorary Doctorate by the Universidad San Ignacio de Loyola in Lima (21 March 2009).
- Honorary Doctorate, Universidad CEU Cardenal Herrera (20 January 2009).
- Honorary Doctorate from the Catholic University San Antonio (11 November 2010).
- Gold Medal of Madrid (May 2011).
- Honorary Doctorate from the University of the Americas Ecuador (11 October 2011).

== Notes ==
Party political offices
Preceded by Jose María Álvarez de Eulate	President of People's Alliance in Castile and León; 1985-1991	Succeeded by Juan José Lucas
Preceded by Isabel Tocino	Vice President of the People's Party; 1989-1990	Succeeded by Office abolished
Preceded by Manuel Fraga Iribarne	President of the People's Party; 1990–2004	Succeeded by Mariano Rajoy
Political offices
Preceded by Jose Constantino Nalda	President of the Junta of Castile and León; 1987–1989	Succeeded by Jesús Posada
Preceded by Manuel Fraga	Leader of the Opposition; 1989–1996	Succeeded by Felipe González
Preceded by Felipe González	Prime Minister of Spain; 1996–2004	Succeeded by José Luis Rodríguez Zapatero
Preceded by Guy Verhofstadt	President of the European Council; 2002	Succeeded by Anders Fogh Rasmussen
