= Hi uTandem =

Free language exchange mobile app

Hi uTandem, also known as uTandem, is a free language exchange mobile app. It helps people to connect with other language learners in order to carry out face-to-face language exchange sessions and also offers learners lists of businesses in the field of language learning or language exchange.

== Use ==
Hi uTandem is built around the concept of language exchange, which is a method of language learning based on mutual oral linguistic exchange between partners. Ideally, each partner is a native speaker of the language they are helping their counterpart to learn. The app designed for users to chat with other users and translate messages, find suitable language partners and to locate language schools, bars, cafés and language exchange groups around them.

== Team and development ==
Hi uTandem was released in January, 2016. The initial idea was conceived by Alberto Rodríguez as part of a team of eight Spanish youngsters. Hi uTandem belongs to the company Velvor Tech S.L., founded by the same members and registered in Ronda (Spain).

== Reception ==
Hi uTandem was listed on the Top 4 Apps to Learn Languages list by ElPlural.com and since its launch it has been featured in numerous online and physical sources, including 20 minutos, Europapress, ABC Andalucía and Telefónica's Think Big Blog.
