= Frente de Estudiantes Sindicalistas =

Spanish student political group

The Frente de Estudiantes Sindicalistas (FES) (English: Front of Syndicalist Students) was a Spanish student group belonging to the Falangist minority opposition to the Francoist regime.

Founded in 1963 in Madrid, the FES was led by Jorge Perales, Sigfredo Hillers and José Real. Initially operating as the student arm of the Frente Nacional de Trabajadores (FNT; "National Front of Workers"), its mottos were Falange sí, Movimiento no ("Yes to Falange, No to Movement"); Falange sí, dictadura no ("Yes to Falange, no to dictatorship") and Por la reconstrucción de Falange ("For the re-building of Falange"). It eventually developed intense conflict with its matrix organization, the FNT, led by Narciso Perales, that transformed into the Revolutionary Syndicalist Front.

The FES was the seed of Falange Española Independiente (FEI).

Prime Minister of Spain José María Aznar, Audiencia Nacional judge Nicolás Poveda Peñas, Juan Fernández Krohn and Juan Diego were members of the organization.

== Bibliography ==
- Casals Meseguer, Xavier (2009). "La renovación de la ultraderecha española: una historia generacional (1)". Historia y Política (22). Madrid: UCM; UNED; CEPC: 233–258. ISSN 1575-0361.
- Payne, Stanley G. (1987). The Franco Regime, 1936–1975. Madison: The University of Wisconsin Press. ISBN 0-299-11070-2.
- Rodríguez Jiménez, José Luis (1994). Reaccionarios y golpistas: la extrema derecha en España : del tardofranquismo a la consolidación de la democracia, 1967-1982. Madrid: CSIC. ISBN 84-00-07442-4.
- Ruiz Carnicer, Miguel Ángel (2013). "Falange y el cambio político y social en la España del desarrollismo. Materiales para explicar una socialización compleja". Falange. Las culturas políticas del fascismo en la España de Franco (1936-1975) (PDF). Zaragoza: Institución Fernando el Católico. p. 397. ISBN 978-84-9911-216-9.
