= Torreciudad =

Marian shrine in Aragon, Spain

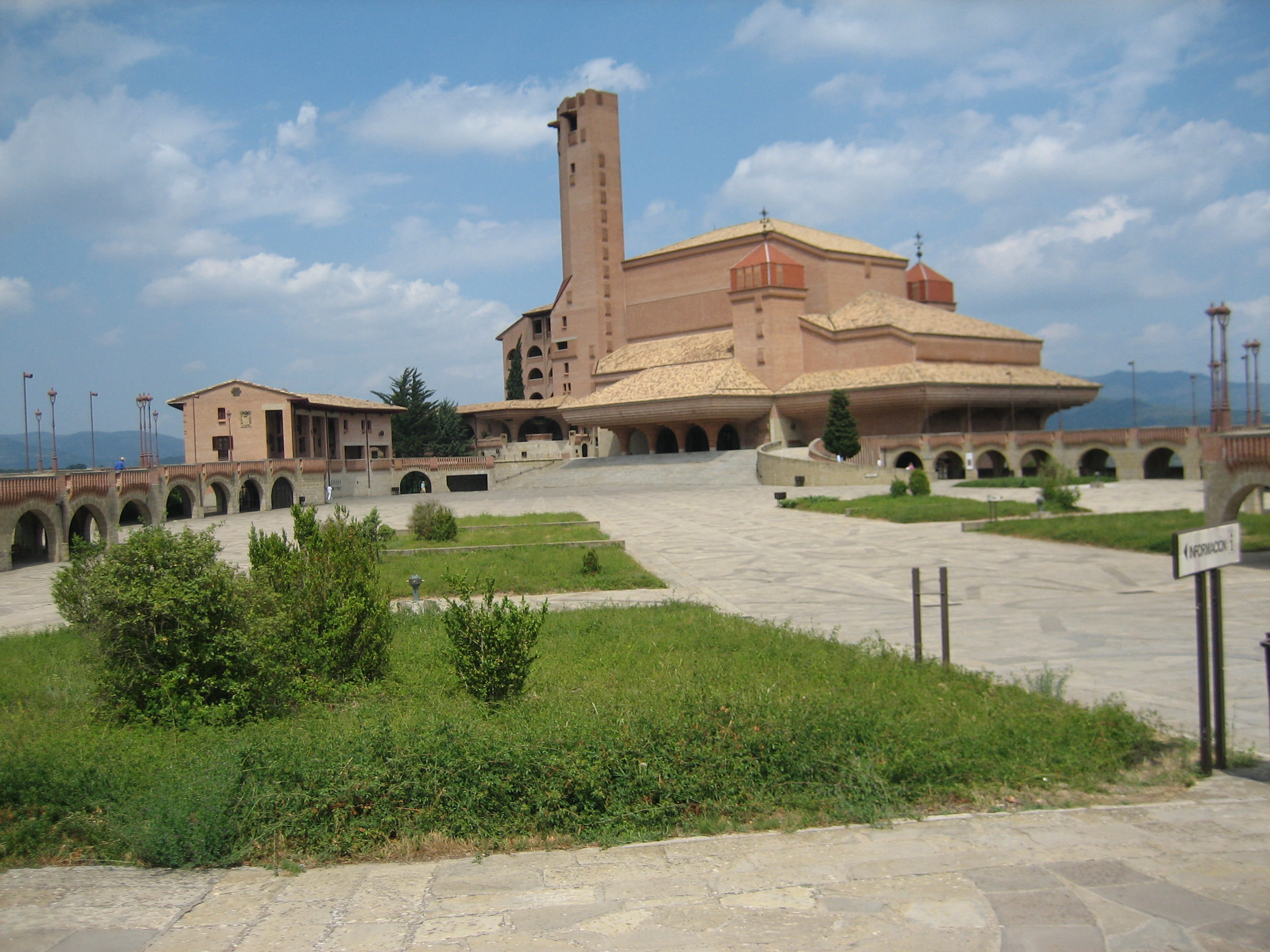
- Shrine of Torreciudad

Religion
- Affiliation: Catholicism
- Year consecrated: 1975

Location
- Location: Aragon
- Country: Spain
- Interactive map of Torreciudad

Architecture
- Architect: Heliodoro Dols

Torreciudad is a Marian shrine in Aragon, Spain, built by Josemaría Escrivá, the founder of Opus Dei, and consecrated on July 7, 1975, under the title of Our Lady of Torreciudad. Devotion to Mary under the title of Virgin of Torreciudad is said to date back to the eleventh century. The Torreciudad Trust is responsible for the upkeep of the shrine and its financial needs.

== Description ==
The shrine was designed by architect Heliodoro Dols (1933–2025) who supervised the construction with the assistance of the architects Santiago Sols and Ramon Mondejar. The main church contains several outstanding features in the alabaster altarpiece by Juan Mayné, and the Blessed Sacrament chapel with its bronze figure of the crucified Christ, by Pasquale Sciancalepore. The crypt contains a chapel dedicated to the Holy Family, as well as three confessional chapels respectively dedicated to Mary under the titles of Virgin of Loreto, Virgin of the Pillar, and Virgin of Guadalupe. The covered archways on the esplanade contain ceramic depictions by José Alzuet of the joyful, sorrowful, and glorious mysteries of the rosary. An old hermitage on the grounds originally housed the original statue of Our Lady of Torreciudad before it was transferred to the new church. A succinct multimedia item of 14 September 2026 provides up to date context and pointers to the modernisation and regularisation of ongoing collaborative arrangements between the multiple charitable and not for profit parties.

Many pilgrims visit northern Aragon to pray at the shrine. Spiritual activities at the Shrine are entrusted to the Opus Dei Prelature. The shrine is open every day of the year.

The shrine trustees commissioned a comprehensive economic impact report which was published in 2024.

== See also ==
- Catholic Church in Spain
- Shrine of the Virgin of the Rosary of Pompei
- Shrines to Mary, mother of Jesus
- List of canonically crowned images
