= Matilde Ucelay =

Spanish architect

Matilde Ucelay Maortúa
- Born: 1912; Madrid, Spain
- Died: 24 November 2008 (aged 95–96); Madrid, Spain
- Known for: Architect
- Spouse: Jose Ruiz-Castillo (m. 1937)
- Awards: Premio Nacional de Arquitectura de España, Complutense University of Madrid

Matilde Ucelay Maortúa (1912 – 24 November 2008) was the first woman licensed in architecture in Spain. She was awarded the Premio Nacional de Arquitectura de España (National Architecture Award of Spain) in 2004.

== Biography ==
Ucelay was the eldest daughter of the lawyer Enrique Sanz and his wife, Pura Ucelay Maortúa Lombera. Her sisters were Luz, Margarita (mother of the historian Enric Ucelay-Da Cal) and Carmen Ucelay. Her mother, Pure Maortúa, who was a great friend of Federico García Lorca, belonged to the Lyceum Club and was a founder of the theater company Anfistora.

She received her baccalaureate from the Instituto-Escuela. In 1931, she entered the School of Architecture at the University of Madrid where she was an active member of Federación Universitaria Escolar (FUE). Ucelay doubled up her course of study, thereby finishing a year ahead of schedule in June 1936. On July 10, at the National Hotel, her peers and friends paid tribute as she became the first woman to receive an architecture degree in Spain. The ceremony was attended by the architect Amós Salvador Carreras, then Minister of the Interior. In the same year, she served on the Governing Board of the Women Association of Architects of Madrid as secretary from August to October (or November), at which time she moved with her family to Valencia.

In January 1937, she married Jose Ruiz-Castillo, lawyer and official of the Ministry of Agriculture, a member of a known family of Madrid editors. His father owned Biblioteca Nueva, which Ruiz-Castillo inherited. The couple had two children, Jose Enrique and Javier.

After the Spanish Civil War, and because of her participation in the Governing Board of the College of Architects of Madrid in 1936, she was tried and charged with "assistance to the rebellion". At trial, testimony was presented in her favor by a number of people. However, she was sentenced on 9 July 1942 to disqualification in perpetuity for public office, banned from the private practice of her profession for five years, and fined 30,000 pesetas. The architecture title she obtained in 1936 was not officially issued to her until 1946.

In the 1950s, her candidacy for the board of the Association of University Women, which she founded with card number seven, was vetoed by the Franco authorities.

In 1998, the Asociación La Mujer Construye (Women Build Association) made a public acknowledgment of Ucelay as the first woman graduate in architecture in Spain. In 2004, she won the National Architecture Award. Two years later, she participated in the Venice Biennale, representing Spain in the event.

She died in Madrid on 24 November 2008.

== Selected works ==
- Oswald House in Puerta de Hierro in Madrid
- House Bernstein
- House Marichalar
- Ortega Esportono house
- House Simone Ortega
- Benitez Lugo House in Las Palmas
- Ucelay house on Long Island
- Bookstores Turner and Hispano-Argentina in Madrid

== Bibliography ==
- Sánchez de Madariaga, Inés (Dir). 2012. Matilde Ucelay Maórtua. Una vida en construcción. Premio Nacional de Arquitectura. Madrid: Ministerio de Fomento. ISBN 978-84-498-0920-0
- Sánchez de Madariaga, Inés (2010): "Amigos del alma. Matilde Ucelay y Félix Candela. La incautación del Colegio de Madrid y la represión de los arquitectos durante el franquismo", en del Cueto Ruiz-Funes, J.-I. (ed.) Félix Candela 1910-2010, Instituto Valenciano de Arte Moderno-Sociedad Estatal de conmemoraciones Culturales, pp. 121–138. ISBN 978-84-92827-95-4.
- Sánchez de Madariaga, Inés (2008): "El papel de las mujeres en la arquitectura y el urbanismo, de Matilde Ucelay a la primera generación universitaria en paridad", en Leboreiro, Marian (ed.), La arquitectura y el urbanismo desde la perspectiva de las arquitectas, Ministerio de Vivienda- ETSAM, Madrid, pp. 69–77. ISBN 978-84-691-9168-2.
