= Pura Maortua =

Pura Maortua Lombera, married Pura Ucelay (Limpias, Cantabria, April 10, 1883 - Madrid, December 3, 1972) was a Spanish theater director of the 20th century.

== Early life ==
She was born into a wealthy family. Her mother was Purificación Lombera, a native of Limpias, and her father, Ramón Maortua, a native of Elorrio (Vizcaya), who worked in the fat and soap industry. She spent her youth in Cantabria, but often lived in Madrid with her uncle, José Gómez Ocaña, a professor of physiology at the Central University. He introduced her to the cultural world of Madrid and accompanied her on her travels throughout Spain, France, and Italy.

== Personal life ==
After marrying Enrique Ucelay, she settled permanently in Madrid. Four daughters were born from their marriage, one of whom was Matilde Ucelay, the first woman in Spain to graduate in Architecture and winner of the National Prize in 2004. Another daughter was Margarita Ucelay, a philologist and specialist in the work of García Lorca.
