= Manuel Aznar Acedo =

Spanish journalist and broadcaster

- Born: 15 September 1916; Bilbao, Spain
- Died: 12 January 2001 (aged 84); Bilbao, Spain
- Occupations: Journalist and radio broadcaster

Manuel Aznar y Acedo (15 September 1916 – 12 January 2001) was a Spanish journalist and radio broadcaster.

== Life ==
He was the son of diplomat and journalist Manuel Aznar Zubigaray. His maternal uncle was footballer Domingo Acedo. He was married to Elvira López y Valdivieso and had four children, including politician, the President of the Government of Spain (May 1996 to August 2004) José María Aznar.

He was a member of the falangist movement and served during the Spanish Civil War as an officer in charge of propaganda for the Spanish Nationalist army. After the war, he worked for Cadena SER (1942–1962) and Radio Nacional de España (1962–1965) and was appointed co-director of the department of radio broadcasting for the Ministry of Information and Tourism (1964–1967). He also founded the newspapers Hoja Oficial de Alicante, Avance and Levante. In 1967, he became the first director of the Escuela Oficial de Radiodifusión y Televisión, the official school of radio and television broadcasting.
