= Heliodoro Dols =

Spanish architect (1933–2025)

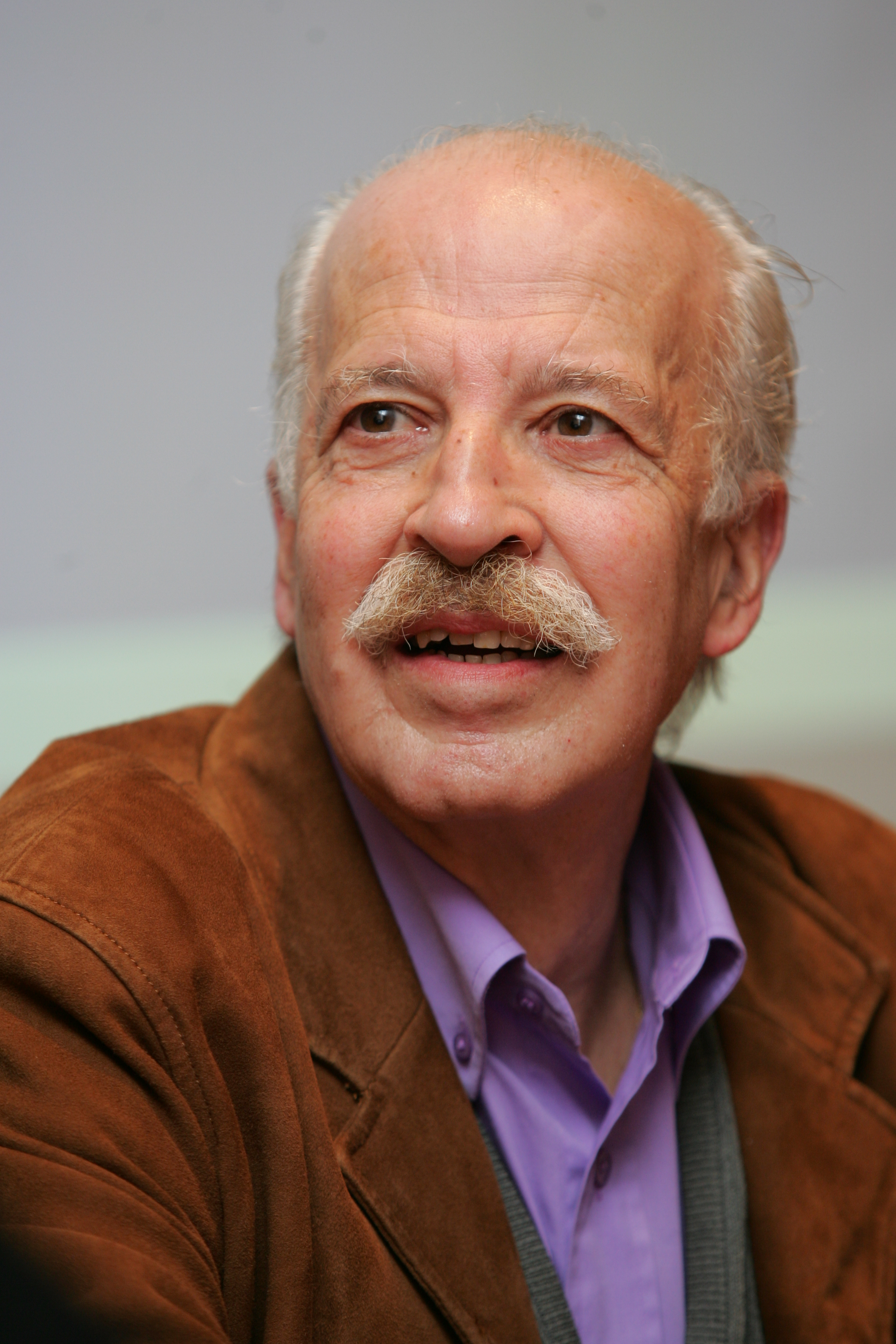
- Dols in 2006
- Born: 7 December 1933; Valencia, Spain
- Died: 28 May 2025 (aged 91)
- Occupation: Architect
- Notable work: Torreciudad
- Awards: National Architecture Award of Spain (1965)

Heliodoro Dols Morell (7 December 1933 – 28 May 2025) was a Spanish architect, recognised with various awards, including the National Architecture Award of Spain (1965). His best-known work is the Santuario de Torreciudad, in Huesca.

== Life and career ==
Dols was born in Valencia, although the family soon moved to Madrid, where he studied Architecture. From a young age he joined Opus Dei as a numerary member.

He graduated from the Higher Technical School of Architecture of Madrid in 1959, and was part of the school's CX Promotion, to which Fernando Higueras, Curro Inza and Luis Peña Ganchegui, among others, also belonged. He earned his Doctorate of Architecture in 1965 and the National Architecture Prize that same year together with the artist Antonio López for their project for a fountain in the Plaza Mayor of Pedraza (Segovia).

From 1963 to 1975, Dols focused primarily on the Torreciudad project. In 1973, he moved to Zaragoza. He spent his architectural career primarily in Aragon, working in places such as Boltaña, Jaca, and San Bruno, Zaragoza. He was known for "[combining] Aragonese folk tradition with a modern flair".

He received a distinction from the Fernando el Católico Institution in 2014.

Dols died on 28 May 2025, at the age of 91.

== Works ==
- Torreciudad, Huesca, Aragon
- Basilica of Santa Engracia (restoration)
- Colegio Mayor Peñalba
- Boltaña Courts, Aragon
- Convent of Carmelitas Descalzas, Huesca
- Plaza de San Bruno, Zaragoza
