= Xavier Casals =

Spanish historian (born 1963)

Xavier Casals Meseguer (born 1963) is a Spanish historian specialized in the field of the far-right.

== Biography ==
Born in 1963 in Barcelona, he has authored several works about the Far right, featuring studies both about the Spanish Neo-nazi and far right scene, as about an international comparative context. He has co-authored a biography of Miguel Primo de Rivera. He also has studied the phenomenon of populism.

== Work ==
- Neonazis en España: de las audiciones wagnerianas a los skinheads (1966-1995) (1995).
- La tentación neofascista en España (Plaza & Janés, 1998).
- Ultrapatriotas: extrema derecha y nacionalismo de la guerra fría a la era de la globalización (Crítica, 2003).
- Miguel Primo de Rivera (Ediciones de Barcelona, 2006), co-authored along Ramón Tamames.
- Ultracatalunya. L'extrema dreta a Catalunya: de l'emergència del búnker al rebuig de les mesquites (1966-2006) (L'esfera dels llibres, 2006).
- El pueblo contra el Parlamento. El nuevo populismo en España. 2009-2013 (Pasado & Presente, 2013), prologue by Enric Ucelay-Da Cal.
- La Transición española. El voto ignorado de las armas (Pasado & Presente, 2016)

== Bibliography ==
- Avilés, Juan (17 June 2016). "La Transición española. El voto ignorado de las armas". El Cultural.
- Avilés Farré, Juan (2013-05-10). "El pueblo contra el Parlamento. El nuevo populismo en España. 2009-2013. Xavier Casals. Prólogo de E. Ucelay-Da Cal. Pasado & Presente, 2013. 336 páginas, 24 euros". El Cultural.
- García Cárcel, Ricardo (2005-07-30). "El dictador sin muertos". Cultural (ABC): 17.
- Gil Pecharromán, Julio (2004). "Violencia skin y neonazi". Revista de Libros (86). Fundación Caja Madrid: 16. ISSN 1137-2249.
- González Calleja, Eduardo (2008). "La violencia política en la España del siglo xx: un balance historiográfico". Mélanges de la Casa de Velázquez. 38 (2). Madrid: Casa de Velázquez: 213–240. doi:10.4000/mcv.627. ISSN 2173-1306.
- Hernández-Carr, Aitor (October–December 2011). "La derecha radical populista en Europa: discurso, electorado y explicaciones". Reis: Revista Española de Investigaciones Sociológicas (136). Madrid: Centro de Investigaciones Sociológicas: 141–159. ISSN 0210-5233. JSTOR 23061483.
- Hernández García, José Ángel (2005). ""Ultra Patriotas" de Xavier Casals Meseguer". Pensamiento y Cultura (8). Universidad de La Sabana: 247–248. ISSN 0123-0999.
- Payne, Stanley (January 2000). "Review Article. Historical Fascism and the Radical Right". Journal of Contemporary History. 35 (1). Sage Publications: 109–118. doi:10.1177/002200940003500110. ISSN 1461-7250. JSTOR 261185. S2CID 159472730.

Works of Casals

- Casals i Meseguer, Xavier (2006). Ultracatalunya. L'extrema dreta a Catalunya: de l'emergència del búnker al rebuig de les mesquites (1966-2006) (PDF). Barcelona: L'esfera dels llibres.
