= Falange Española Independiente =

Falange Española Independiente Independent Spanish Phalanx
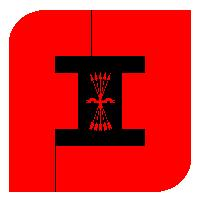
- Leader: Sigfredo Hillers de Luque; Norberto Pedro Pico Sanabria
- Founded: 23 February 1977
- Dissolved: 7 February 2004
- Preceded by: Frente de Estudiantes Sindicalistas (FES) "October" Youth Association
- Merged into: Falange Española de las JONS
- Headquarters: C/ Fernando Garrido 16 1º - 28015 - Madrid
- Student wing: Frente de Estudiantes Sindicalistas
- Ideology: Falangism; Anti-Francoism; National syndicalism Spanish nationalism Third position
- Political position: Far-right
- Colors: Red Black

Party flag

Falange Española Independiente (FEI; English: Independent Spanish Phalanx) was a Spanish political party registered in 1977, originating from the Frente de Estudiantes Sindicalistas (FES), a student group of anti-Francoist falangists.

== History ==
Led by Sigfredo Hillers, the FES became the Spanish Falange Independent on 23 February 1977, and celebrated its First National Congress on 27 and 28 October 1979.

After the resignation of Sigfredo Hillers in the 1980s and change most of the members and cadres of the organization left to join FE-JONS, and the organization was almost considered extinct. But, due to the persistence of a few veterans of the FES, the party was able to survive. FEI gained notoriety again in 1999, when, after an internal crisis in FE-JONS, many members joined the party.

In 2000 FEI formed an electoral coalition with the group Falange 2000. In 2004 both Falange 2000 and FEI merged with FE-JONS.

== See also ==
- Falange Española
- JONS
- FE-JONS
- FET-JONS

== Bibliography ==
- José Luis Rodríguez Jiménez. Reaccionarios y golpistas. La extrema derecha en España: del tardofranquismo a la consolidación de la democracia (1967-1982). Consejo Superior de Investigaciones Científicas, CSIC, 1994. ISBN 84-00-07442-4.
