= Luis Laorga =

Spanish architect

Luis Laorga (1919 - 1990) was a Spanish architect.

Luis Laorga was a key architect in the Spanish architecture of the second half of the twentieth century. His contributions are of great relevance, both for his built projects as well as for the way to produce them. It is certainly one of the architects that changed the architectural scene in Spain. During his professional career he signed around 600 projects, many of them relevant proposals, more than a dozen of which were awarded first prizes in different competitions.

He became an architect in 1946. In his first years he obtained the first prize in four important competitions, three of them together with Javier Sáenz de Oiza, former classmate: the Santuario de Aránzazu, the Basílica de la Merced and the planning of the aqueduct area in Segovia. They were awarded the Spanish National Award of Architecture in 1947. Simultaneously, he developed other projects, such as the church of the Rosario in Batán.

During the 50s he worked, above all, in housing projects, from social housing, such as the ‘poblado mínimo’ of Caño Roto, to the houses for the USAF in Madrid and Zaragoza. He designed also various complexes for self-construction in the periphery of Madrid, as well as several houses in the countryside. His collective housing buildings are remarkable too, being particularly outstanding Ponzano 71 and Concha Espina 65. During those years he developed also projects for educational facilities, such as Recuerdo, in Chamartín, and a number of rural schools.

In the 1960 decade he faced multiple big scale projects. Together with José López Zanón, he developed the projects for the Laboral Universities of Coruña, Madrid, Cáceres and Huesca; the Nautical Schools of Cádiz, Bilbao, San Sebastián, Tenerife, Lanzarote, Alicante and Vigo, as well as the Civil Engineering University of Madrid.

Also, during the 60s Laorga completed a large number of educational facility projects, such as Nuestra Señora de los Milagros, in Ourense; San Buenaventura School, in Madrid; the seminary of the Paules, in Andújar; Melchor Cano School, in Tarancón or the Colegio Mayor Loyola, in the Ciudad Universitaria of Madrid. He built likewise five churches: La Natividad and La Visitación, in Moratalaz; San Juan de Ávila, in Usera; La Merced, in Los Peñascales and Nuestra Señora de la Peña, in Vallecas.

In parallel to such a number of projects and to the dedication to his numerous relatives and friends, Laorga was always committed to multiple social initiatives of diverse scales and in different fields. For example, father Llanos explains how Laorga took him to the Pozo del Tío Raimundo and built for him the first ‘chabola’, shack. During the 50s and 60s he developed many other works in the Pozo: classrooms, a school, a cinema or a nursery.

In the 70s Laorga abandoned the big scale, with very few exceptions, and focused in single family houses, most of them for relatives or friends, until 1981, when a stroke resulted in a hemiplegia that made him quit architecture definitely.

He displayed a very personal language in all his projects. He begins with total rationality in the disposition of uses and elements of the programme, and then, with constructive and structural rigour, employs a variety of materials and solutions. It is a sober but expressive, fresh and frugal way of doing architecture. Those are projects with a strong character, in which the different layers are articulated with each other with simplicity, from the adaptation to the place, scale and uses, to the comfort of the users. The rigour of calculating every detail and the greatest economy of means result, however, in comfortable and homely projects. This is so thanks, to a great extent, to how the materials and their disposition characterize the construction. Every project has a unique personality, even though they are developed with similar strategies and comparable programmes. All of them have been drawn with formal freedom, which presents itself, above all, in the details and the singular elements of the programme.
