= Steven Forti =

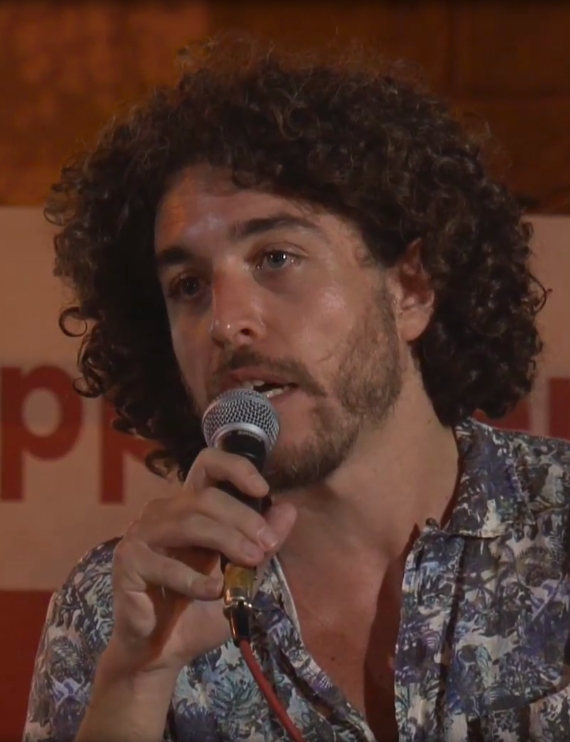
- Born: 1981 (age 44–45); Trento
- Title: Historian and Columnist

Steven Forti (born 1981 in Trento) is an Italian historian and associate professor at the Autonomous University of Barcelona (UAB). He specialises in the study of fascisms, nationalisms, and far-right movements in contemporary history.

He received his PhD in History in 2011 from UAB with a dissertation supervised by Pere Ysàs and Luciano Casali, which formed the basis of his work El peso de la nación. Nicola Bombacci, Paul Marion y Óscar Pérez Solís en la Europa de entreguerras (2014), examining the shift of left-wing politicians toward fascist positions during the interwar period. In 2017 he co-edited, together with Enric Ucelay-Da Cal and Arnau González i Vilalta, the study El Proceso separatista en Cataluña. Análisis de un pasado reciente (2006-2017).

He is a member of the Centre d'Estudis sobre les Èpoques Franquista i Democràtica (CEFID) and the Seminari Interuniversitari d'Investigadors del Feixisme (SIdIF).

== Published works ==
Author

- El peso de la nación. Nicola Bombacci, Paul Marion y Óscar Pérez Solís en la Europa de entreguerras. Santiago de Compostela: Universidade de Santiago de Compostela – Publicacions da Cátedra Juana de Vega. 2014.
- Extrema derecha 2.0. Qué es y cómo combatirla. Madrid: Siglo XXI. 2021. ISBN 978-84-323-2030-9.

Co-author

- Forti, Steven; Russo Spena (2016). Ada Colau, La città in comune. Da occupante di case a sindaca di Barcellona (con un'intervista a Luigi De Magistris). Roma: Edizioni Alegre.
- Veiga; González-Villa; Forti; Sasso, Ramón; Prokopljevic (2019). Patriotas indignados. Sobre la nueva ultraderecha en la Posguerra Fría. Madrid: Alianza Editorial.

Editor

- "El Proceso separatista en Cataluña. Análisis de un pasado reciente (2006-2017)". Índice Histórico Español. Granada: Editorial Comares. 2017.
- Mitos y cuentos de la extrema derecha. Catarata. 2023. ISBN 978-84-1352-845-8.
