= Josep Maria Fradera =

Spanish historian

Josep M. Fradera
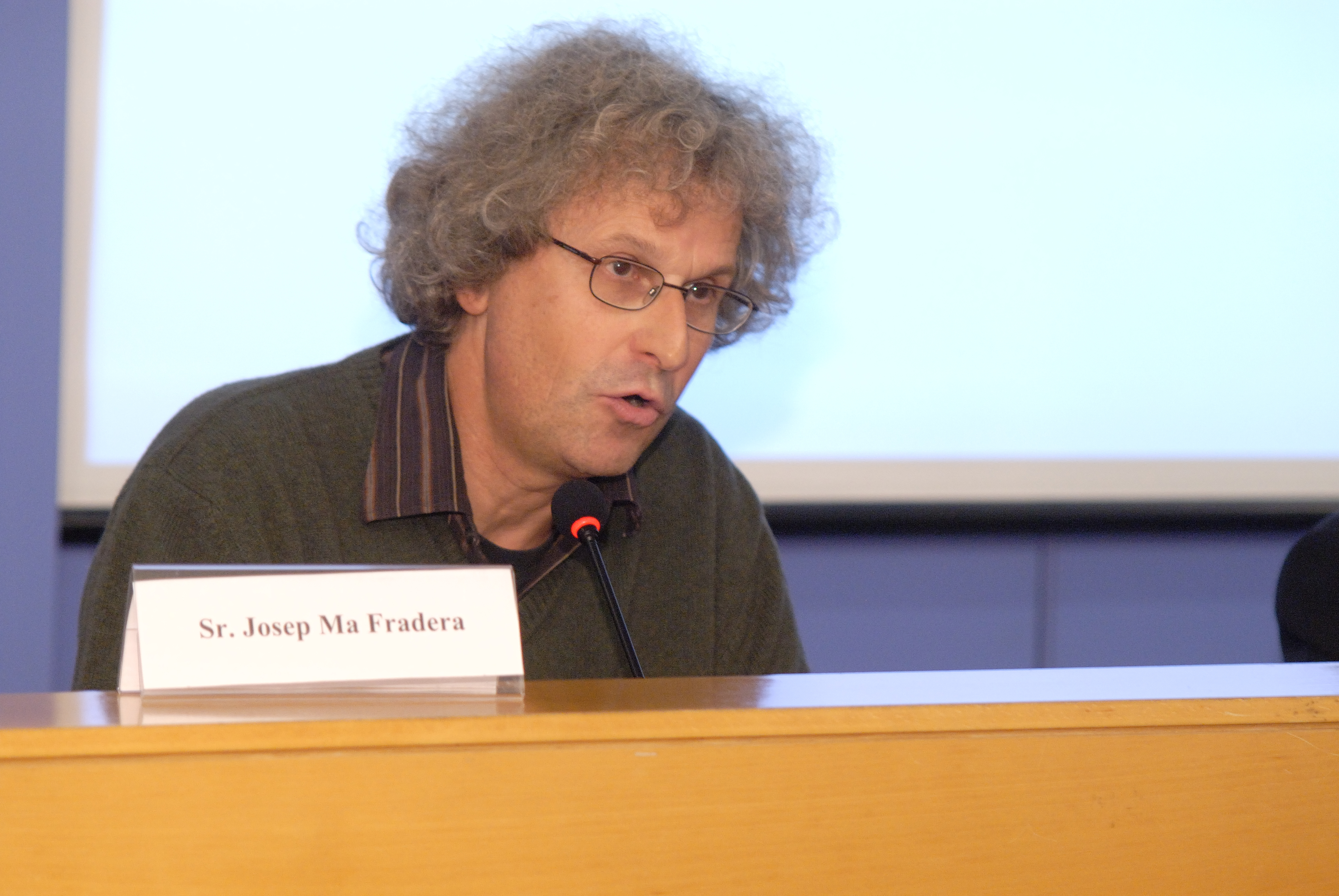
- Born: 1952 (age 73–74)

Academic background
- Education: Autonomous University of Barcelona
- Thesis: Crisi colonial i mercat interior, 1814-1837. Les bases comercials de la indústria catalana moderna
- Doctoral advisor: Josep Fontana

Academic work
- Discipline: history
- Institutions: Pompeu Fabra University
- Main interests: late Spanish Empire history of Catalonia

Josep Maria Fradera i Barceló (born 1952) is a Spanish historian, professor of Contemporary History at the Pompeu Fabra University. Specialised in the colonial system of the late Spanish Empire, he has also studied the history of Catalonia.

== Biography ==
Fradera was born in Mataró in 1952. An anti-francoist activist in his youth and member of the Unified Socialist Party of Catalonia (PSUC), Fradera began his college studies at the Autonomous University of Barcelona (UAB) in 1971. He earned a PhD from the UAB in 1983, reading a dissertation titled Crisi colonial i mercat interior, 1814-1837. Les bases comercials de la indústria catalana moderna and supervised by Josep Fontana.

From 1987 to 1988, he worked as research assistant of John H. Elliott at the Institute for Advanced Study in Princeton.

He was appointed to a chair of Contemporary History at the Pompeu Fabra University (UPF) in 1996. He has been a visiting scholar at the University of Chicago and at the Harvard University's Center For European Studies. He is also a researcher for the Catalan Institution for Research and Advanced Studies (ICREA).

He writes in Spanish and Catalan.

== Works ==
- — (1987). Indústria i mercat: les bases comercials de la indústria catalana moderna (1814-1845). Barcelona: Ed. Crítica.
- — (1992). Cultura nacional en una societat dividida. (Patriotisme i cultura a Catalunya (1838-1868). Barcelona: Curial.
- — (1996). Jaume Balmes: els fonaments racionals d'una política catòlica. Vic: Eumo Editorial.
- — (1999). Filipinas la colonia más peculiar. La Hacienda pública en la definición de la política colonial, 1762-1868. Madrid: Consejo Superior de Investigaciones Científicas.
- — (1999). Gobernar colonias. Barcelona: Editorial Península.
- — (2005). Colonias para después de un imperio.
- — (2009). La patria dels catalans. Barcelona: La Magrana.
- — (2015). La nación imperial. Derechos, representación y ciudadanía en los imperios de Gran Bretaña, Francia, España y Estados Unidos (1750-1918). Barcelona: Edhasa.
