= El Plural =

Left-wing online newspaper

Coordinates: 40.422283°N 3.708589°W

elplural.com
- Progressive Daily Newspaper
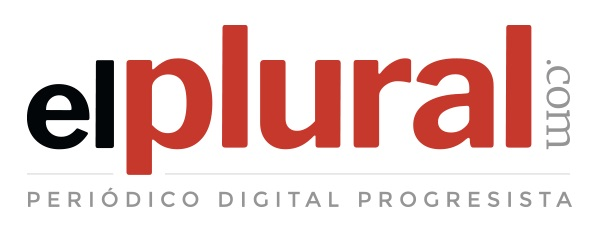
- Type: Digital daily
- Founder: Enric Sopena
- Publisher: Corporate Communicator
- Editor-in-chief: Marcos Paradinas
- Founded: 19 September 2005; 20 years ago
- Political alignment: Aligned with Spanish Socialist Workers' Party
- Language: Spanish
- Headquarters: Gran Vía, 64 Madrid Spain
- Website: www.elplural.com

elplural.com is a Spanish language news site which has been publishing since 19 September 2005. It defines itself as a combination of information with opinion which tries to offer its readers general interest news.

== History ==
elplural.com was born as a project by the Catalan journalist Enric Sopena, whose previous experience came from audiovisual or written media such as La Vanguardia and TVE. Despite its geographical origin in Catalonia, El Plural deals with national and international topics, and over time a fixed section has focused on Andalusia, together with other regional sections. From 2010, Enric Sopena became a shareholder of the newspaper's publishing company. Until then the ownership of this medium was in the hands of a company linked to Lavinia TV.

On 22 March 2017, the General Shareholders' Meeting of elplural.com accepted the retirement request of Enric Sopena as director of the newspaper, becoming 'President 'Emeritus', writing an opinion column titled 'Cabos Sueltos'.

The journalist Angélica Rubio became the director of the site, having served as Economics editor.

== Structure ==
The newspaper has sections on Politics, Economic, Communications and Society. In addition, elplural.com has an Autonomous communities' section, focused on Catalonia, the Balearic Islands and Andalusia. The latter, since 26 September 2016, is formed by the integration of the Andaluces Diario newspaper, led by the journalist Antonio Avendaño, who joined from Público.

The Opinion section is composed of conventional articles and analysis, as well as cartoons from the series "Los Calvitos", by humorist Patricio Rocco, a.k.a. Pat.

Apart from the usual sections, the newspaper includes various magazines, such as El Telescopio - dedicated to Technology and Innovation -, La Pimienta de la Vida - focused on gastronomy and lifestyle - Motor - automotive sector associated with the Autofácil publication -, Playtime - leisure and culture and Fuera de Foco, a miscellaneous section about social media, curiosities and humorous news.

== Editorial line ==
El Plural defines itself as a progressive daily. It has had connections with PSC-PSOE. It is aligned social-democratically. In 2011, journalist Carlos Carnicero lost his job at the publication following repeated criticism of former Prime Minister Zapatero's PSOE government.
