= 1987 Castilian-Leonese regional election =

Election in the Spanish region of Castile and León

- 10 June 1987

All 84 seats in the Cortes of Castile and León 43 seats needed for a majority
- Opinion polls
- Registered: 1,997,693 ▲0.2%
- Turnout: 1,461,386 (73.2%) ▲3.4 pp
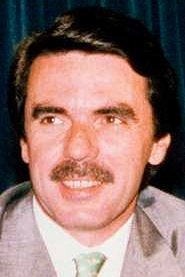

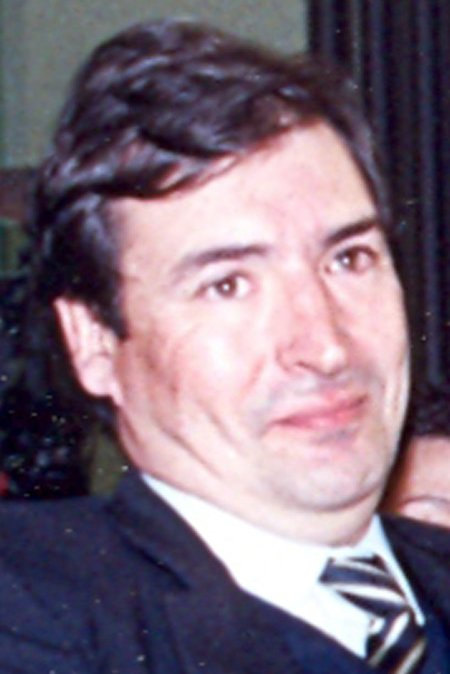

	First party	Second party	Third party
Leader	José María Aznar	Juan José Laborda	Carlos Sánchez-Reyes
Party	AP	PSOE	CDS
Leader since	22 June 1985	3 March 1987	1987
Leader's seat	Valladolid	Burgos	Valladolid
Last election	39 seats (CP) (Note: Within the AP–PDP–UL alliance in the 1983 election: AP (31 seats), PDP (6 seats), UL/PL (1 seat) and PANCAL (1 seat).)	42 seats, 44.4%	2 seats, 6.0%
Seats won	32	32	18
Seat change	▲1	▼10	▲16
Popular vote	493,488	488,469	278,253
Percentage	34.4%	34.0%	19.4%
Swing	n/a	▼10.4 pp	▲13.4 pp
	Fourth party	Fifth party
Leader	Rafael de las Heras	Tomás Cortés
Party	PDP	SI
Leader since	1986	1987
Leader's seat	Segovia	Burgos
Last election	6 seats (CP)	Did not contest
Seats won	1	1
Seat change	▼5	▲1
Popular vote	35,080	19,282
Percentage	2.4%	1.3%
Swing	n/a	New party
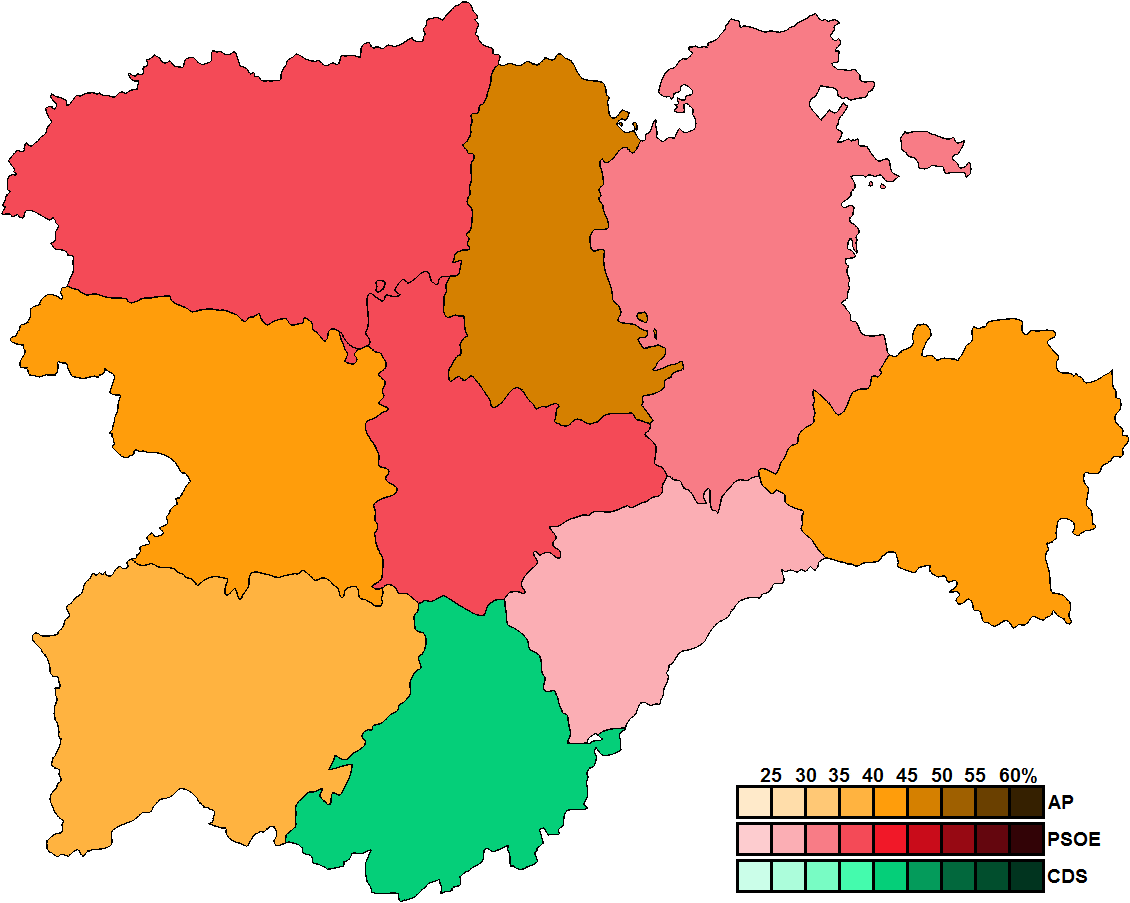
- Constituency results map for the Cortes of Castile and León
President before election
José Constantino Nalda
PSOE
President after election
José María Aznar
AP

A regional election was held in Castile and León on 10 June 1987 to elect the 2nd Cortes of the autonomous community. All 84 seats in the Cortes were up for election. It was held concurrently with regional elections in twelve other autonomous communities and local elections all across Spain, as well as the 1987 European Parliament election.

Expectations for the ruling Spanish Socialist Workers' Party (PSOE) were low after the resignation in October 1986 of former president Demetrio Madrid, besieged by a judicial investigation on the alleged fraudulent sale of a former textile company of his property and by internal opposition from within his party. The election saw both the PSOE and the opposition People's Alliance (AP)—which ran on its own after the break up of the People's Coalition with the People's Democratic Party (PDP) and the Liberal Party (PL) the previous year—lose ground to the Democratic and Social Centre (CDS) which, with 18 seats and 19.4% of the share, scored the best result for a third party in a Castilian-Leonese regional election to date. The PDP was able to win one seat by Segovia, with Castile and León becoming one of the only two autonomous communities—the other being Navarre—in which the party was able to secure parliamentary representation. In Burgos, a breakway party, Independent Solution (SI), formed by the incumbent mayor of its capital city, José María Peña San Martín, obtained one seat in the regional Cortes.

As a result of the election, the support of PDP and SI procurators and the decisive abstention of the CDS, AP candidate José María Aznar was able to become President of the Regional Government of Castile and León, replacing Socialist José Constantino Nalda and starting an uninterrupted stay of over three decades in power for AP and its successor, the People's Party (PP). Aznar's presidency would last until 1989, when he would resign to Jesús Posada in order to become the PP's national leader and, in 1996, prime minister of Spain.

== Overview ==
Under the 1983 Statute of Autonomy, the Cortes of Castile and León was the unicameral legislature of the homonymous autonomous community, having legislative power in devolved matters, as well as the ability to grant or withdraw confidence from a regional president. The electoral and procedural rules were supplemented by national law provisions.

=== Date ===
The term of the Cortes of Castile and León expired four years after the date of its previous ordinary election. The election decree was required to be issued no later than 25 days before the scheduled expiration date of parliament and published on the following day in the Official Gazette of Castile and León (BOCYL), with election day taking place between 54 and 60 days after the decree's publication. The previous election was held on 8 May 1983, which meant that the chamber's term would have expired on 8 May 1987. The election decree was required to be published in the BOCYL no later than 14 April 1987, setting the latest possible date for election day on 13 June 1987.

The Cortes of Castile and León could not be dissolved before the expiration date of parliament, except in the event of an investiture process failing to elect a regional president within a two-month period from the first ballot. In such a case—provided this did not happen during the last year of parliament before its planned expiration—the Cortes were to be automatically dissolved and a snap election called, with elected lawmakers serving the remainder of its original four-year term.

The election to the Cortes of Castile and León was officially called on 14 April 1987 with the publication of the corresponding decree in the BOCYL, setting election day for 10 June and scheduling for the chamber to reconvene on 2 July.

=== Electoral system ===
Voting for the Cortes was based on universal suffrage, comprising all Spanish nationals over 18 years of age, registered in Castile and León and with full political rights, provided that they had not been deprived of the right to vote by a final sentence, nor were legally incapacitated.

The Cortes of Castile and León had three seats per each multi-member constituency—corresponding to the provinces of Ávila, Burgos, León, Palencia, Salamanca, Segovia, Soria, Valladolid and Zamora—plus one additional seat per 45,000 inhabitants or fraction above 22,500. All were elected using the D'Hondt method and closed-list proportional voting, with a three percent-threshold of valid votes (including blank ballots) in each constituency. The use of this electoral method resulted in a higher effective threshold depending on district magnitude and vote distribution.

As a result of the aforementioned allocation, each Cortes constituency was entitled the following seats:

Seats	Constituencies
15	León
14	Valladolid
11	Burgos, Salamanca
8	Zamora
7	Ávila, Palencia
6	Segovia
5	Soria

The law did not provide for by-elections to fill vacant seats; instead, any vacancies arising after the proclamation of candidates and during the legislative term were filled by the next candidates on the party lists or, when required, by designated substitutes.

=== Outgoing parliament ===
The table below shows the composition of the parliamentary groups in the chamber at the time of the election call.

Parliamentary composition in April 1987
Groups	Parties	Legislators	
Groups	Parties	Seats	Total
Socialist Parliamentary Group	PSOE	41	41
People's Parliamentary Group	AP	31	36
People's Parliamentary Group	PDP	5	36
Mixed Parliamentary Group	CDS	1	7
Mixed Parliamentary Group	PANCAL	1 (Note: Francisco José Alonso.)	7
Mixed Parliamentary Group	INDEP	5 (Note: Manuel Cabezas, former PSOE legislator; Antonio Martín Beaumont and Fernando Gil Nieto, former AP legislators; José Manuel Hernández, former CDS legislator; Francisco Montoya, former PDL/PRD legislator.)	7

== Parties and candidates ==
The electoral law allowed for parties and federations registered in the interior ministry, alliances and groupings of electors to present lists of candidates. Parties and federations intending to form an alliance were required to inform the relevant electoral commission within 10 days of the election call, whereas groupings of electors needed to secure the signature of at least one percent of the electorate in the constituencies for which they sought election, disallowing electors from signing for more than one list.

Below is a list of the main parties and alliances which contested the election:

Candidacy	Parties and alliances	Leading candidate	Ideology	Previous result		Gov.	Ref.
Candidacy	Parties and alliances	Leading candidate	Ideology	Vote %	Seats	Gov.	Ref.
PSOE	List: Spanish Socialist Workers' Party (PSOE)	Juan José Laborda	Social democracy	44.4%	42	Yes	
AP	List: People's Alliance (AP)	José María Aznar	Conservatism; National conservatism	39.7%	39	No	
PDP	List: People's Democratic Party (PDP)	Rafael de las Heras	Christian democracy	39.7%	39	No	
CDS	List: Democratic and Social Centre (CDS)	Carlos Sánchez-Reyes	Centrism; Liberalism	6.0%	2	No	
IU	List: Communist Party of Castile and León (PCCyL); Socialist Action Party (PASOC); Communist Party of the Peoples of Spain (PCPE); Progressive Federation (FP); Republican Left (IR)	Antonio Herreros	Socialism; Communism	3.2% (Note: Results for PCCL–PCE in the 1983 election.)	0	No	
SI	List: Independent Solution (SI)	Tomás Cortés	Conservatism; Localism	Did not contest		No	

== Opinion polls ==
The tables below list opinion polling results in reverse chronological order, showing the most recent first and using the dates when the survey fieldwork was done, as opposed to the date of publication. Where the fieldwork dates are unknown, the date of publication is given instead. The highest percentage figure in each polling survey is displayed with its background shaded in the leading party's colour. If a tie ensues, this is applied to the figures with the highest percentages. The "Lead" column on the right shows the percentage-point difference between the parties with the highest percentages in a poll.

=== Voting intention estimates ===
The table below lists weighted voting intention estimates. Refusals are generally excluded from the party vote percentages, while question wording and the treatment of "don't know" responses and those not intending to vote may vary between polling organisations. When available, seat projections determined by the polling organisations are displayed below (or in place of) the percentages in a smaller font; 43 seats were required for an absolute majority in the Cortes of Castile and León.

Polling firm/Commissioner	Fieldwork date	Sample size	Turnout	PSOE	AP–PDP–PL	CDS	IU	PDL	AP	PDP	SI	Lead
1987 regional election	10 Jun 1987	—N/a	73.2	34.0; 32	–	19.4; 18	3.8; 0	–	34.4; 32	2.4; 1	1.3; 1	0.4
Government of Castile and León	27 May 1987	?	?	? 34/36	–	? 19/20	–	–	? 29/30	? 1/2	–	?
Demoscopia/El País	22–26 May 1987	?	60	29.4; 28/31	–	21.3; 18/20	5.3; 1	–	36.8; 33/35	2.0; 1	–	7.4
1986 general election	22 Jun 1986	—N/a	72.8	38.8 (36)	35.8 (34)	17.5 (14)	2.5 (0)	1.3 (Note: Results for PRD.) (0)	(Note: Within CP.)		–	3.0
Edis	28 Jul 1985	?	?	49.7	30.7	9.0	<5.0	–			–	19.0
1983 regional election	8 May 1983	—N/a	69.8	44.4; 42	39.7; 39	6.0; 2	3.2 (Note: Results for PCE.); 0	2.7; 1			–	4.7

=== Voting preferences ===
The table below lists raw, unweighted voting preferences.

Polling firm/Commissioner	Fieldwork date	Sample size	PSOE	AP–PDP–PL	CDS	IU	PDL	AP	PDP	SI	Question	X mark	Lead
1987 regional election (Note: Does not include non-resident citizens.)	10 Jun 1987	—N/a	24.5	–	13.9	2.7	–	24.7	1.8	1.0	—N/a	31.9	0.2
CIS	2–5 Jun 1987	4,603	22.4	–	12.6	2.3	–	18.9	0.7	–	36.6	4.9	3.5
CIS	9–16 May 1987	6,566	22.7	–	11.6	1.7	0.1	16.7	0.6	–	39.5	5.5	6.0
CIS	14–23 Apr 1987	6,566	23.3	–	10.8	1.7	0.1	14.1	0.7	–	42.7	5.3	9.2
CIS	12–22 Mar 1987	5,652	25.0	–	11.0	2.0	0.0	13.0	0.0	–	41.0	6.0	12.0
CIS	1 Dec 1986	4,496	29.8	–	10.1	1.7	0.2	13.2	0.5	–	36.1	6.5	16.6
1986 general election	22 Jun 1986	—N/a	27.9	25.8	12.6	1.8	1.0			–	—N/a	26.6	2.1
CIS	1 Feb–1 Mar 1986	2,501	26.5	13.3	3.1	1.4	0.4			–	42.6	10.9	13.2
1983 regional election	8 May 1983	—N/a	30.5	27.3	4.1	2.2	1.9			–	—N/a	30.2	3.2

=== Victory preferences ===
The table below lists opinion polling on the victory preferences for each party in the event of a regional election taking place.

Polling firm/Commissioner	Fieldwork date	Sample size	PSOE	CDS	IU	PDL	AP	PDP	Other/ None	Question	Lead
CIS	2–5 Jun 1987	4,603	27.8	16.8	2.7	–	23.8	0.8	2.1	26.0	4.0
CIS	9–16 May 1987	6,566	29.5	14.8	2.0	0.1	21.0	0.5	0.9	31.2	8.5
CIS	14–23 Apr 1987	6,566	29.2	14.7	2.0	0.1	18.0	0.7	1.2	33.8	11.2
CIS	12–22 Mar 1987	5,652	29.0	14.0	2.0	0.0	17.0	1.0	1.0	36.0	12.0
CIS	1 Dec 1986	4,496	35.8	13.3	2.0	0.2	16.4	0.6	1.7	30.0	19.4

=== Victory likelihood ===
The table below lists opinion polling on the perceived likelihood of victory for each party in the event of a regional election taking place.

Polling firm/Commissioner	Fieldwork date	Sample size	PSOE	CDS	IU	PDL	AP	PDP	Other/ None	Question	Lead
CIS	2–5 Jun 1987	4,603	42.4	6.0	0.3	–	12.1	0.2	0.2	38.8	30.3
CIS	9–16 May 1987	6,566	40.5	6.3	0.1	0.0	9.9	0.2	0.2	42.7	30.6
CIS	14–23 Apr 1987	6,566	40.5	6.0	0.1	0.0	7.7	0.3	0.3	45.1	32.8
CIS	12–22 Mar 1987	5,652	41.0	5.0	0.0	0.0	7.0	0.0	0.0	47.0	34.0
CIS	1 Dec 1986	4,496	54.8	3.0	0.1	0.0	5.5	0.1	0.1	36.3	49.3

=== Preferred President ===
The table below lists opinion polling on leader preferences to become president of the Regional Government of Castile and León.

Polling firm/Commissioner	Fieldwork date	Sample size										Other/ None/ Not care	Question	Lead
Polling firm/Commissioner	Fieldwork date	Sample size	Nalda PSOE	Laborda PSOE	Aznar AP	Calvo CDS	Fernando CDS	S.-Reyes CDS	Herreros IU	M. Villa PDP	Heras PDP	Other/ None/ Not care	Question	Lead
CIS	2–5 Jun 1987	4,603	–	19.7	18.0	–	–	3.9	1.8	–	1.9	11.0	43.7	1.7
CIS	9–16 May 1987	6,566	–	10.1	9.0	–	–	0.7	1.1	–	2.2	16.5	60.4	1.1
CIS	14–23 Apr 1987	6,566	10.2	4.4	6.1	1.3	1.3	–	–	8.3	–	16.7	51.9	1.9

== Results ==
=== Overall ===
← Summary of the 10 June 1987 Cortes of Castile and León election results →
Parties and alliances	Popular vote			Seats	
Parties and alliances	Votes	%	±pp	Total	+/−
People's Alliance (AP)^{1}	493,488	34.36	n/a	32	+1
Spanish Socialist Workers' Party (PSOE)	488,469	34.01	−10.36	32	−10
Democratic and Social Centre (CDS)	278,253	19.37	+13.41	18	+16
United Left (IU)^{2}	54,676	3.81	+0.58	0	±0
People's Democratic Party (PDP)^{1}	35,080	2.44	n/a	1	−5
Independent Solution (SI)	19,282	1.34	New	1	+1
Workers' Party of Spain–Communist Unity (PTE–UC)	11,943	0.83	New	0	±0
Leonesist Union (UNLE)	8,960	0.62	New	0	±0
Party of El Bierzo (PB)	5,387	0.38	+0.07	0	±0
Nationalist Party of Castile and León (PNCL–PANCAL)^{1}	5,190	0.36	n/a	0	−1
Regionalist Party of the Leonese Country (PREPAL)	4,090	0.28	−2.23	0	±0
Humanist Platform (PH)	3,934	0.27	New	0	±0
Liberal Party (PL)^{1}	2,213	0.15	n/a	0	−1
Spanish Phalanx of the CNSO (FE–JONS)	1,828	0.13	New	0	±0
Spanish Ruralist Party (PRE)	749	0.05	New	0	±0
Liberal Democratic Party (PDL)	n/a	n/a	−2.72	0	−1
Blank ballots	22,690	1.58	+0.62		
Total	1,436,232			84	±0
Valid votes	1,436,232	98.28	−0.23		
Invalid votes	25,154	1.72	+0.23		
Votes cast / turnout	1,461,386	73.15	+3.31		
Abstentions	536,307	26.85	−3.31		
Registered voters	1,997,693				
Sources
Footnotes: ^{1} Within the People's Coalition alliance in the 1983 election.; ^{2} United Left results are compared to Communist Party of Spain totals in the 1983 election.

Popular vote
AP	34.36%
PSOE	34.01%
CDS	19.37%
IU	3.81%
PDP	2.44%
SI	1.34%
Others	3.08%
Blank ballots	1.58%

Seats
AP	38.10%
PSOE	38.10%
CDS	21.43%
PDP	1.19%
SI	1.19%

=== Distribution by constituency ===
Constituency	AP		PSOE		CDS		PDP		SI	
Constituency	%	S	%	S	%	S	%	S	%	S
Ávila	30.3	2	23.5	2	40.6	3	1.9	−		
Burgos	30.3	4	34.4	4	17.1	2	1.7	−	10.0	1
León	33.8	6	38.2	7	13.7	2	1.7	−		
Palencia	45.0	4	33.4	2	13.7	1				
Salamanca	35.2	4	35.0	4	21.7	3	0.9	−		
Segovia	22.4	1	26.8	2	22.6	2	17.7	1		
Soria	41.7	2	32.3	2	14.3	1	5.5	−		
Valladolid	32.7	5	36.4	6	20.3	3	0.9	−		
Zamora	43.0	4	32.5	3	16.7	1	2.0	−		
Total	34.4	32	34.0	32	19.4	18	2.4	1	1.3	1

== Aftermath ==
=== Government formation ===
Investiture; Nomination of José María Aznar (AP)
Ballot →	21 July 1987	21 July 1987
Required majority →	43 out of 84	Simple
Yes: • AP (32); • PDP (1); • SI (1)	34 / 84	34 / 84
No: • PSOE (32)	32 / 84	32 / 84
Abstentions: • CDS (18)	18 / 84	18 / 84
Absentees	0 / 84	0 / 84

=== 1989 investiture ===
Investiture; Nomination of Jesús Posada (PP)
Ballot →	15 September 1989
Required majority →	43 out of 84
Yes: • PP (31); • CDS (18); • INDEP (2)	51 / 84
No: • PSOE (29); • INDEP (1)	30 / 84
Abstentions	0 / 84
Absentees: • PSOE (2); • CDS (1)	3 / 84

== Bibliography ==
- Ley Orgánica 4/1983, de 25 de febrero, de Estatuto de Autonomía de Castilla-León (Organic Law 4/1983). Official State Gazette (in Spanish). 25 February 1983. BOE-A-1983-6483.
- Ley Orgánica 5/1985, de 19 de junio, del Régimen Electoral General (Organic Law 5/1985). Official State Gazette (in Spanish). 19 June 1985 [version as of 3 April 1987]. BOE-A-1985-11672.
- Ley 3/1987, de 30 de marzo, Electoral de Castilla y León (Law 3/1987). Official State Gazette (in Spanish). 30 March 1987 [version as of 1 April 1987]. BOE-A-1987-9475.
- Decreto 74/1987, de 13 de abril, por el que se convocan elecciones a las Cortes de Castilla y León (PDF) (Decree 74/1987). Official Gazette of Castile and León (in Spanish). 13 April 1987. BOCYL-D-14041987-1.
