= 1983 Castilian-Leonese regional election =

Election in the Spanish region of Castile and León

- 8 May 1983

All 84 seats in the Cortes of Castile and León 43 seats needed for a majority
- Registered: 1,993,809
- Turnout: 1,392,403 (69.8%)
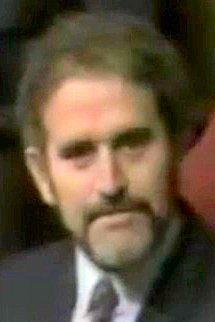

	First party	Second party	Third party
Leader	Demetrio Madrid	None/Various (Note: AP–PDP–UL did not field a single candidate for the post of regional president nor a single visible leader; instead, prominence was given to the lead candidate in each of the constituencies where it ran.)	Daniel de Fernando
Party	PSOE	AP–PDP–UL	CDS
Leader since	12 February 1983	—	1983
Leader's seat	Zamora	—	Ávila
Seats won	42	39	2
Popular vote	608,604	543,851	81,741
Percentage	44.4%	39.7%	6.0%
	Fourth party
Leader	Francisco Montoya
Party	PDL
Leader since	1983
Leader's seat	Burgos
Seats won	1
Popular vote	37,301
Percentage	2.7%
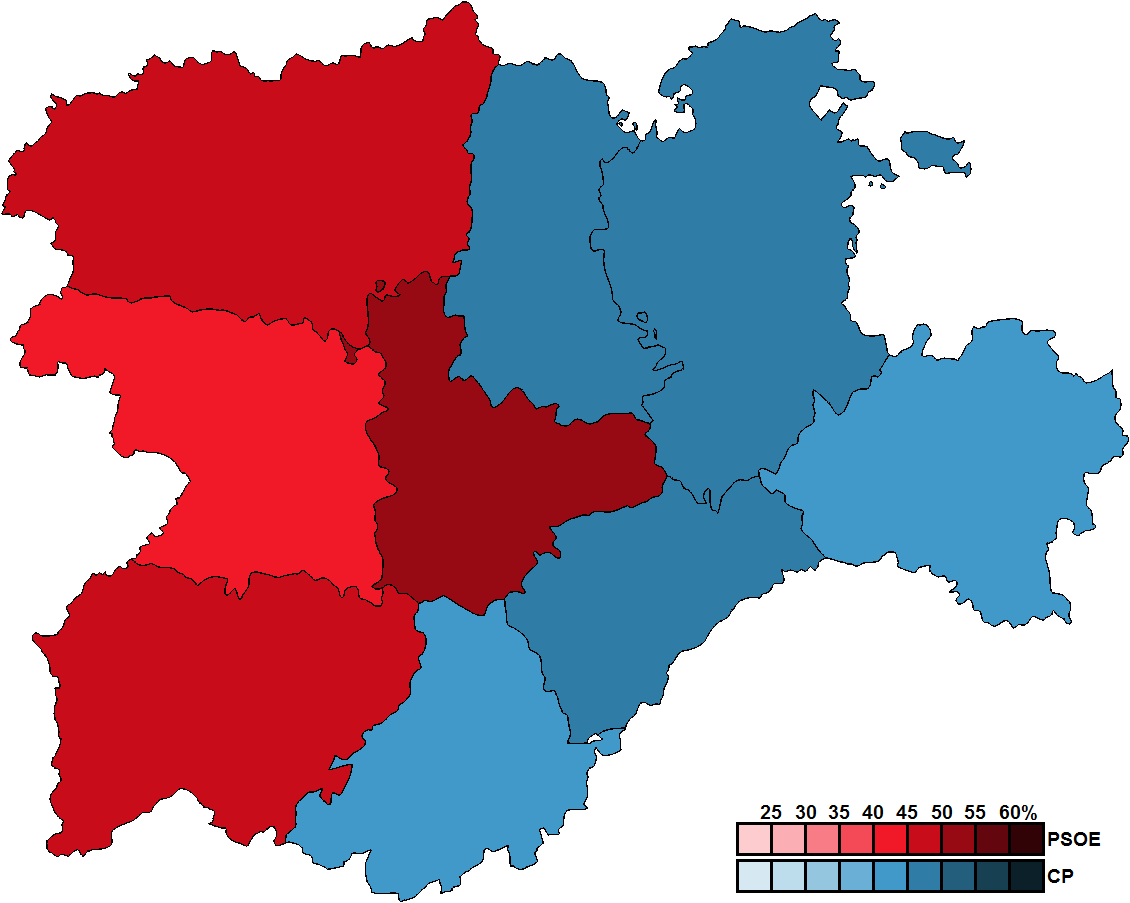
- Constituency results map for the Cortes of Castile and León
President before election
José Manuel García-Verdugo
Independent (ex-UCD) (Note: The UCD was dissolved as a political party in February 1983, with its regional presidents and elected officials maintaining their offices either as independents or joining other parties ahead of the May 1983 regional elections.)
President after election
Demetrio Madrid
PSOE

A regional election was held in Castile and León on 8 May 1983 to elect the 1st Cortes of the autonomous community. All 84 seats in the Cortes were up for election. It was held concurrently with regional elections in twelve other autonomous communities and local elections all across Spain.

The election granted a victory for the Spanish Socialist Workers' Party (PSOE) with 44.4% of the vote, but at 42 seats the party remained one seat short of an overall majority and at exactly half the size of the Cortes. The People's Coalition, an electoral alliance led by the right-wing People's Alliance (AP) and including the People's Democratic Party (PDP) and the Liberal Union (UL), became the second largest force in the community closely behind the PSOE, with 39 seats and 39.7%. Former Spanish prime minister Adolfo Suárez's Democratic and Social Centre (CDS) and the small Liberal Democratic Party (PDL) both entered the Cortes with two and one seats, respectively. The Communist Party of Spain (PCE), on the other hand, performed poorly, being unable to win any seats and obtaining 2.4% of the share.

Throughout the abstentions from CDS and PDL, the PSOE candidate Demetrio Madrid became the new regional president in a second round of voting, as the PSOE's 42 seats did not secure an absolute majority of seats to be elected in the first round. This would be the only time that the PSOE would go on to form the regional government, as well as the only out of two times—the other being in 2019—that the party would become the most voted political force in a regional election.

== Overview ==
Under the 1983 Statute of Autonomy, the Cortes of Castile and León was the unicameral legislature of the homonymous autonomous community, having legislative power in devolved matters, as well as the ability to grant or withdraw confidence from a regional president. The electoral and procedural rules were supplemented by national law provisions (which were those used in the 1977 general election).

=== Date ===
The General Council of Castile and León, in agreement with the Government of Spain, was required to call an election to the Cortes of Castile and León before 31 May 1983.

The Cortes of Castile and León could not be dissolved before the expiration date of parliament, except in the event of an investiture process failing to elect a regional president within a two-month period from the first ballot. In such a case, the Cortes were to be automatically dissolved and a snap election called, with elected lawmakers serving the remainder of its original four-year term.

On 7 March 1983, it was confirmed that the first Cortes election would be held on 8 May, together with regional elections for twelve other autonomous communities as well as the regularly scheduled nationwide local elections. The election to the Cortes of Castile and León was officially called on 10 March 1983 with the publication of the corresponding decree in the Official Gazette of Castile and León, setting election day for 8 May.

=== Electoral system ===
Voting for the Cortes was based on universal suffrage, comprising all Spanish nationals over 18 years of age, registered in Castile and León and with full political rights.

The Cortes of Castile and León had three seats per each multi-member constituency—corresponding to the provinces of Ávila, Burgos, León, Palencia, Salamanca, Segovia, Soria, Valladolid and Zamora—plus one additional seat per 45,000 inhabitants or fraction above 22,500. All were elected using the D'Hondt method and closed-list proportional voting, with a three percent-threshold of valid votes (including blank ballots) in each constituency. The use of this electoral method resulted in a higher effective threshold depending on district magnitude and vote distribution.

As a result of the aforementioned allocation, each Cortes constituency was entitled the following seats:

Seats	Constituencies
15	León
14	Valladolid
11	Burgos, Salamanca
8	Zamora
7	Ávila, Palencia
6	Segovia
5	Soria

The law did not provide for by-elections to fill vacant seats; instead, any vacancies arising after the proclamation of candidates and during the legislative term were filled by the next candidates on the party lists or, when required, by designated substitutes.

=== Provisional parliament ===
The regional Statute established a provisional assembly—to remain in place until an election to the actual Cortes of Castile and León could be held—which was to be made up of as many members as entitled by the regional electoral system, designated by political parties, on the basis of party results obtained in the 1982 Spanish general election (distributed by applying the D'Hondt method to provincial results and an electoral threshold of three percent of valid votes). As a result, the composition of the General Council of Castile and León, upon its constitution in March 1983, was as indicated below:

Parliamentary composition in March 1983
Parties	% of votes	Seats									
Parties	% of votes	A	B	L	P	Sa	Se	So	V	Z	Total
PSOE	42.38	2	5	8	4	6	3	2	8	3	41
AP–PDP	34.56	3	5	5	3	4	3	2	5	3	33
UCD	12.27	−	1	2	−	1	−	1	1	2	8
CDS	5.50	2	−	−	−	−	−	−	−	−	2
Total		7	11	15	7	11	6	5	14	8	84

== Parties and candidates ==
The electoral law allowed for parties and federations registered in the interior ministry, alliances and groupings of electors to present lists of candidates. Parties and federations intending to form an alliance were required to inform the relevant electoral commission within 15 days of the election call, whereas groupings of electors needed to secure the signature of at least one permille—and, in any case, 500 signatures—of the electorate in the constituencies for which they sought election, disallowing electors from signing for more than one list.

Below is a list of the main parties and alliances which contested the election:

Candidacy	Parties and alliances	Leading candidate	Ideology	Gov.	Ref.
PSOE	List: Spanish Socialist Workers' Party (PSOE)	Demetrio Madrid	Social democracy	No	
AP–PDP–UL	List: People's Alliance (AP); People's Democratic Party (PDP); Liberal Union (UL); Regionalist Party of Castile and León (PANCAL)	None/Various	Conservatism; Christian democracy	No	
CDS	List: Democratic and Social Centre (CDS)	Daniel de Fernando	Centrism; Liberalism	No	
PCCL–PCE	List: Communist Party of Castile and León (PCCL–PCE)	Angel Cristóbal Rodríguez	Eurocommunism	No	
PDL	List: Liberal Democratic Party (PDL)	Francisco Montoya	Liberalism	No	

The electoral disaster of the Union of the Democratic Centre (UCD) in the October 1982 general election and the outcome of its extraordinary congress held in December, in which the party's leadership chose to transform the UCD into a christian democratic political force, brought the party to a process of virtual disintegration as many of its remaining members either switched party allegiances, split into new, independent candidacies or left politics altogether. Subsequent attempts to seek electoral allies ahead of the incoming 1983 local and regional elections, mainly the conservative People's Alliance (AP) and the christian democratic People's Democratic Party (PDP), had limited success due to concerns from both AP and UCD over such alliance policy: AP strongly rejected any agreement that implied any sort of global coalition with UCD due to the party's ongoing decomposition, and prospects about a possible PDP–UCD merger did not come into fruition because of the latter's reluctance to dilute its brand within another party. By the time the UCD's executive had voted for the liquidation of the party's mounting debts and its subsequent dissolution on 18 February 1983, electoral alliances with the AP–PDP coalition had only been agreed in some provinces of the Basque Country and Galicia.

Together with AP, the PDP had agreed to maintain their general election alliance—now rebranded as the People's Coalition—for the May local and regional elections, with the inclusion of the Liberal Union (UL), a political party created in January 1983 out of independents from the AP–PDP coalition in an attempt to appeal to former UCD liberal voters. The Coalition had seen its numbers soar from late February as a result of many former members from the UCD's christian democratic wing joining the PDP.

== Results ==
=== Overall ===
Summary of the 8 May 1983 Cortes of Castile and León election results →
Parties and alliances	Popular vote			Seats	
Parties and alliances	Votes	%	±pp	Total	+/−
Spanish Socialist Workers' Party (PSOE)	608,604	44.37	n/a	42	n/a
People's Coalition (AP–PDP–UL)	543,851	39.65	n/a	39	n/a
Democratic and Social Centre (CDS)	81,741	5.96	n/a	2	n/a
Communist Party of Castile and León (PCCL–PCE)	44,357	3.23	n/a	0	n/a
Liberal Democratic Party (PDL)	37,301	2.72	n/a	1	n/a
Agrarian Bloc–Regionalist Party of the Leonese Country (BAR–PREPAL)	34,398	2.51	n/a	0	n/a
Party of El Bierzo (PB)	4,301	0.31	n/a	0	n/a
Spanish Communist Workers' Party–Unified Communist Party (PCOE–PCEU)	1,974	0.14	n/a	0	n/a
Castilian Communal Unity (UCC)	1,958	0.14	n/a	0	n/a
Blank ballots	13,103	0.96	n/a		
Total	1,371,588			84	n/a
Valid votes	1,371,588	98.51	n/a		
Invalid votes	20,815	1.49	n/a		
Votes cast / turnout	1,392,403	69.84	n/a		
Abstentions	601,406	30.16	n/a		
Registered voters	1,993,809				

Popular vote
PSOE	44.37%
AP–PDP–UL	39.65%
CDS	5.96%
PCCL–PCE	3.23%
PDL	2.72%
BAR–PREPAL	2.51%
Others	0.60%
Blank ballots	0.96%

Seats
PSOE	50.00%
AP–PDP–UL	46.43%
CDS	2.38%
PDL	1.19%

=== Distribution by constituency ===
Constituency	PSOE		CP		CDS		PDL	
Constituency	%	S	%	S	%	S	%	S
Ávila	31.4	2	41.3	3	23.3	2		
Burgos	36.9	4	45.3	6	4.6	−	7.9	1
León	47.7	9	35.2	6	2.4	−	4.3	−
Palencia	41.0	3	46.9	4	4.9	−		
Salamanca	49.8	6	37.6	5	3.7	−		
Segovia	39.8	3	45.8	3	5.7	−	4.7	−
Soria	38.5	2	44.2	3	7.7	−		
Valladolid	53.3	9	34.5	5	4.7	−		
Zamora	41.1	4	40.8	4	7.4	−	6.0	−
Total	44.4	42	39.7	39	6.0	2	2.7	1

== Aftermath ==
=== Government formation ===
Investiture; Nomination of Demetrio Madrid (PSOE)
Ballot →	23 May 1983	23 May 1983
Required majority →	43 out of 84	Simple
Yes: • PSOE (42)	42 / 84	42 / 84
No: • AP–PDP–UL (39)	39 / 84	39 / 84
Abstentions: • CDS (2); • PDL (1)	3 / 84	3 / 84
Absentees	0 / 84	0 / 84

=== 1986 investiture ===
The poor economic situation of a textile company property of the newly elected regional president Demetrio Madrid, Pekus, weakened his standing within his party and would eventually lead to Madrid's political downfall. In the years previous to his accession to power, Madrid had saved the company from default by borrowing several loans from the Zamora Provincial Savings Bank. By early 1984, Madrid's debts—amounting to 15 million Pta—resulted in an embargo notice over his patrimony, unraveling a crisis within the regional PSOE as the party was about to hold a regional congress in which Madrid's suitability for the office came under scrutiny in light of a possible conflict of interest. On 29 January, a slim majority voted to re-elect Madrid as secretary general, but during the following year the political landscape of the autonomous community would become dominated by the PSOE's internal division over Madrid's management and confrontational style.

In March 1985, amid growing tensions, the PSOE replaced Madrid as their regional secretary general by Juan José Laborda. In July 1985, Madrid sold Pekus to stop criticism on the company's dire economic situation, but a lawsuit was filed against him by the company's workers over the alleged fraudulent sale of the firm. Despite Madrid's will to remain in the post and run as candidate for a second term in office in the 1987 election, the judicial investigation compromised his personal position, being forced to resign as regional president after his indictment for a societal crime on 29 October 1986, though he would later be acquitted of any wrongdoing. José Constantino Nalda, who served as regional minister of the Presidency and Territorial Administration, was selected to replace Madrid in the post.

Investiture; Nomination of José Constantino Nalda (PSOE)
Ballot →	14 November 1986
Required majority →	43 out of 84
Yes: • PSOE (41); • INDEP (2)	43 / 84
No: • AP–PDP–PL (36); • CDS (1); • INDEP (2)	39 / 84
Abstentions: • PANCAL (1)	1 / 84
Absentees: • PSOE (1)	1 / 84

== Bibliography ==
- Real Decreto-ley 20/1977, de 18 de marzo, sobre Normas Electorales (Royal Decree-Law 20/1977). Official State Gazette (in Spanish). 18 March 1977. BOE-A-1977-7445.
- Ley Orgánica 4/1983, de 25 de febrero, de Estatuto de Autonomía de Castilla-León (Organic Law 4/1983). Official State Gazette (in Spanish). 25 February 1983. BOE-A-1983-6483.
- Decreto núm. 34/1983 de 9 de Marzo, de la Presidencia del Consejo General de Castilla y León, por el que se acuerda la publicación del Decreto núm. 1/1983 de 5 de Marzo del Pleno del Consejo General de Castilla y León de convocatoria de elecciones a Cortes de Castilla y León (PDF) (Decree 34/1983). Official Gazette of Castile and León (in Spanish). 9 March 1983. BOCYL-D-10031983-4.
