= List of presidents of the Senate of Spain =

The president of the Senate is the highest authority of the Senate of Spain, the upper house of the Cortes Generales, the legislative branch of Spain. The President is elected by and among the incumbent senators.

The office was established in 1834 by the Royal Statue which structured the legislature as a bicameral parliament with an upper house called House of Peers, formed by high clerics, grandees, other nobles and relevant members of the civil society. The current name of the upper house is Senate since 1837 and is currently regulated in Part III, Section 69 of the Constitution of 1978 which establishes a chamber with two kind of members: popular-elected senators and senators designated by regional legislatures.

In its almost two centuries of history, the Senate has not been always active. Between August 1836 and November 1837 the upper house was suppressed because of a revolt against the conservative government of the Queen Regent which forced her to reinstate the Constitution of 1812. In late 1837, a new Constitution was passed and the political stability restored. The next suppression happened in 1873, after the abdication of King Amadeo I, and was reestablished in 1877 when the Constitution of 1876 was passed.

Under the protection of this last constitution, there was the longest period of stability that lasted until the dictatorship of Primo de Rivera in 1923, which established a unicameral parliament. After the end of the dictatorship and the end of the Reign of Alfonso XIII, the Second Republic did not recover the upper house and maintained the unicameral parliament, thing that also did the dictator Francisco Franco. With the recovery of democracy, in 1977 the bicameral parliament was reestablished.

Since its creation in 1834, 44 people have served as president in 63 presidencies. The first president was the Duke of Bailén who served for 60 days before resigning. The shortest presidency was that of the Marquess of Miraflores which was president briefly between August 3 and August 12, 1836 and the longest was that of Javier Rojo serving 7 years, 8 months and 10 days. Many presidents have served in non-consecutive terms in office; The Marquess of Miraflores and Eugenio Montero Ríos served in five non-consecutive terms. The first woman who have served as president was Esperanza Aguirre, between 1999 and 2002. The current and 63rd President is Pedro Rollán, senator representing Madrid.

== List ==
=== House of Peers ===
Presidency	Name	Start	End	Party	Election	Refs.
Reign of Isabella II under the Regency of Maria Christina of Bourbon (1833-1840)
1st	The Duke of Bailén	17 July 1834	15 September 1834	Independent	Royal Prerogative (Royal Statue of 1834 § 12)	
2nd	The Duke of Ahumada	15 September 1834	30 May 1835	Independent	Royal Prerogative (Royal Statue of 1834 § 12)	
3rd	Pedro González Vallejo; Archbishop-elect of Toledo	10 October 1835	23 May 1836	Independent	Royal Prerogative (Royal Statue of 1834 § 12)	
4th	The Marquess of Miraflores	3 August 1836	12 August 1836	Moderate	Royal Prerogative (Royal Statue of 1834 § 12)	
The House of Peers was suppressed during 1836 and 1837

=== Senate ===
Presidency	Name	Start	End	Party	Election	Refs.
Reign of Isabella II under the Regency of Maria Christina of Bourbon (1833-1840)
5th	The Count of Fontao	18 November 1837	11 October 1840	Moderate	Royal Prerogative (Constitution of 1837 § 31)	
Reign of Isabella II under the Regency of Baldomero Espartero (1840-1843)
6th	The Count of Almodóvar	5 March 1841	31 May 1842	Progressive	Royal Prerogative (Constitution of 1837 § 31)	
7th	Álvaro Gómez Becerra	22 June 1842	19 May 1843	Progressive	Royal Prerogative (Constitution of 1837 § 31)	
Reign of Isabella II (Queen's coming of age) (1843-1868)
8th	Mauricio Carlos de Onís	14 October 1843	4 July 1844	Progressive	Provisional Government	
9th	The Count of Fontao	2 October 1844	28 July 1845	Moderate	Royal Prerogative (Constitution of 1837 § 31)	
10th	The Marquess of Miraflores	5 November 1845	30 October 1846	Moderate	Royal Prerogative (Constitution of 1845 § 30)	
11th	The Marquess of Viluma	29 December 1846	5 October 1847	Moderate	Royal Prerogative (Constitution of 1845 § 30)	
12th	The Marquess of Miraflores	6 November 1847	6 April 1851	Moderate	Royal Prerogative (Constitution of 1845 § 30)	
13th	The Marquess of Viluma	27 May 1851	7 January 1852	Moderate	Royal Prerogative (Constitution of 1845 § 30)	
14th	The Marquess of Miraflores	21 November 1852	2 December 1852	Moderate	Royal Prerogative (Constitution of 1845 § 30)	
15th	Joaquín Ezpeleta Enrile	12 February 1853	9 April 1853	Moderate	Royal Prerogative (Constitution of 1845 § 30)	
16th	The Marquess of Viluma	18 November 1853	16 July 1857	Moderate	Royal Prerogative (Constitution of 1845 § 30)	
17th	Francisco Javier de Istúriz	30 January 1858	11 September 1858	Moderate	Royal Prerogative (Constitution of 1845 § 30)	
18th	The Marquess of Duero	20 November 1858	10 October 1865	Moderate	Royal Prerogative (Constitution of 1845 § 30)	
19th	The Duke of la Torre	12 December 1865	30 December 1866	Liberal Union	Royal Prerogative (Constitution of 1845 § 30)	
20th	The Marquess of Miraflores	19 March 1867	6 December 1868	Moderate	Royal Prerogative (Constitution of 1845 § 30)	
Reign of Amadeo I (1871-1873)
21st	Francisco Santa Cruz Pacheco	4 April 1871	28 June 1872	Constitutional	Chosen by the House (Constitution of 1869 § 46)	
22nd	Laureano Figuerola	18 September 1872	11 February 1873	Constitutional	Chosen by the House (Constitution of 1869 § 46)	
The Senate was suppressed during 1873 and 1877					Chosen by the House (Constitution of 1869 § 46)	
Reign of Alfonso XII (1875-1885)					Chosen by the House (Constitution of 1869 § 46)	
23rd	Manuel García Barzanallana	24 April 1877	25 June 1881	Conservador	Royal Prerogative (Constitution of 1876 § 36)	
24th	The Marquess of La Habana	18 September 1881	26 July 1883	Conservador	Royal Prerogative (Constitution of 1876 § 36)	
25th	The Duke of la Torre	12 December 1883	31 March 1884	Dynastic Left	Royal Prerogative (Constitution of 1876 § 36)	
26th	The Count of Puñonrrostro	16 May 1884	11 July 1885	Conservador	Royal Prerogative (Constitution of 1876 § 36)	
Regency of Maria Christina of Austria (1885-1902)
27th	Arsenio Martínez Campos	23 December 1885	8 March 1886	Liberal	Royal Prerogative (Constitution of 1876 § 36)	
28th	The Marquess of La Habana	8 May 1886	29 December 1890	Conservador	Royal Prerogative (Constitution of 1876 § 36)	
29th	Arsenio Martínez Campos	27 February 1891	4 February 1893	Liberal	Royal Prerogative (Constitution of 1876 § 36)	
30th	The Marquess of La Habana	3 April 1893	16 October 1894	Conservador	Royal Prerogative (Constitution of 1876 § 36)	
31st	Eugenio Montero Ríos	10 November 1894	28 February 1896	Liberal	Royal Prerogative (Constitution of 1876 § 36)	
32nd	José Elduayen Gorriti	7 May 1896	26 February 1898	Conservador	Royal Prerogative (Constitution of 1876 § 36)	
33rd	Eugenio Montero Ríos	18 April 1898	16 March 1899	Liberal	Royal Prerogative (Constitution of 1876 § 36)	
34th	Arsenio Martínez Campos	30 May 1899	23 September 1900 / 18 October 1900	Liberal	Royal Prerogative (Constitution of 1876 § 36)	
35th	Marcelo Azcárraga Palmero	18 October 1900	8 November 1900	Conservador	Royal Prerogative (Constitution of 1876 § 36)	
36th	The Count of Tejada de Valdosera	8 November 1900	24 April 1901	Conservador	Royal Prerogative (Constitution of 1876 § 36)	
37th	Eugenio Montero Ríos	8 June 1901	26 March 1903	Liberal	Royal Prerogative (Constitution of 1876 § 36)	
Reign of Alfonso XIII (1902-1931)
37th	Eugenio Montero Ríos	8 June 1901	26 March 1903	Liberal	Royal Prerogative (Constitution of 1876 § 36)	
38th	Marcelo Azcárraga Palmero	15 May 1903	16 December 1904	Conservador	Royal Prerogative (Constitution of 1876 § 36)	
39th	The Marquess of Pidal	19 December 1904	17 August 1905	Conservador	Royal Prerogative (Constitution of 1876 § 36)	
40th	José López Domínguez	9 October 1905	6 July 1906	Liberal	Royal Prerogative (Constitution of 1876 § 36)	
41st	Eugenio Montero Ríos	17 September 1906	30 March 1907	Liberal	Royal Prerogative (Constitution of 1876 § 36)	
42nd	Marcelo Azcárraga Palmero	10 May 1907	14 April 1910	Conservador	Royal Prerogative (Constitution of 1876 § 36)	
43rd	Eugenio Montero Ríos	9 June 1910	11 June 1913	Liberal	Royal Prerogative (Constitution of 1876 § 36)	
44th	Marcelo Azcárraga Palmero	8 November 1913	30 May 1915	Conservador	Royal Prerogative (Constitution of 1876 § 36)	
45th	Joaquín Sánchez de Toca	25 June 1915	16 March 1916	Conservador	Royal Prerogative (Constitution of 1876 § 36)	
46th	The Marquess of Alhucemas	6 May 1916	19 April 1917	Liberal	Royal Prerogative (Constitution of 1876 § 36)	
47th	Alejandro Groizard	31 May 1917	2 May 1919	Liberal	Royal Prerogative (Constitution of 1876 § 36)	
48th	Manuel Allendesalazar Muñoz	23 June 1919	15 December 1919	Conservador	Royal Prerogative (Constitution of 1876 § 36)	
49th	Joaquín Sánchez de Toca	15 December 1919	>6 April 1923	Conservador	Royal Prerogative (Constitution of 1876 § 36)	
50th	The Count of Romanones	26 May 1923	13 November 1923	Liberal	Royal Prerogative (Constitution of 1876 § 36)	
The Senate was suppressed during 1923 and 1977

Presidency	Name	Start	End	Party	Election	Votes
Reign of Juan Carlos I (1975-2014)
51st	Antonio Fontán	15 June 1977	26 March 1979	UCD	Chosen by the House (Constitution of 1978 § 72)	132 votes
52nd	Cecilio Valverde	27 March 1979	17 November 1982	UCD	Chosen by the House (Constitution of 1978 § 72)	122 votes
53rd	José Federico de Carvajal	18 November 1982	20 November 1989	PSOE	Chosen by the House (Constitution of 1978 § 72)	158 votes 235 votes
54th	Juan José Laborda	21 November 1989	26 March 1996	PSOE	Chosen by the House (Constitution of 1978 § 72)	144 votes 137 votes
55th	Juan Ignacio Barrero	27 March 1996	9 February 1999	PP	Chosen by the House (Constitution of 1978 § 72)	238 votes
56th	Esperanza Aguirre	9 February 1999	17 October 2002	PP	Chosen by the House (Constitution of 1978 § 72)	223 votes
57th	Juan José Lucas	22 October 2002	1 April 2004	PP	Chosen by the House (Constitution of 1978 § 72)	155 votes 151 votes
58th	Javier Rojo	2 April 2004	12 December 2011	PSOE	Chosen by the House (Constitution of 1978 § 72)	128 votes 134 votes
59th	The Count of Badarán	13 December 2011	20 May 2019	PP	Chosen by the House (Constitution of 1978 § 72)	180 votes
Reign of Felipe VI (2014-)
59th	The Count of Badarán	13 December 2011	20 May 2019	PP	Chosen by the House (Constitution of 1978 § 72)	180 votes 144 votes 151 votes
60th	Manuel Cruz	21 May 2019	2 December 2019	PSOE	Chosen by the House (Constitution of 1978 § 72)	140 votes
61st	Pilar Llop	3 December 2019	8 July 2021	PSOE	Chosen by the House (Constitution of 1978 § 72)	130 votes
-	Cristina Narbona (acting)	8 July 2021	12 July 2021	PSOE	Chosen by the House (Constitution of 1978 § 72)	-
62nd	Ander Gil	12 July 2021	16 August 2023	PSOE	Chosen by the House (Constitution of 1978 § 72)	132 votes
63rd	Pedro Rollán	17 August 2023	Incumbent	PP	Chosen by the House (Constitution of 1978 § 72)	142 votes

== See also ==
- List of presidents of the Congress of Deputies
