= Ávila (Cortes of Castile and León constituency) =

Coordinates: 40°35′N 5°00′W

- Cortes of Castile and León; Electoral constituency
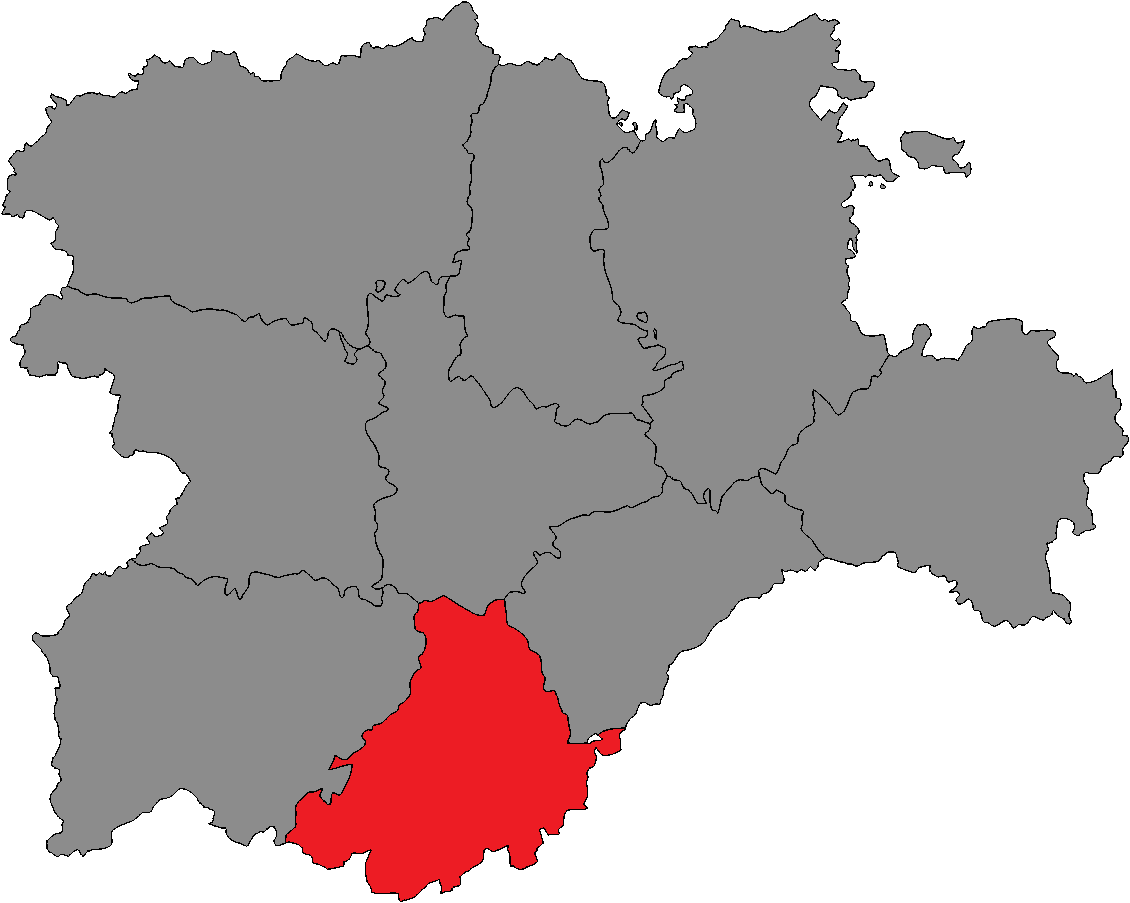
- Location of Ávila within Castile and León
- Province: Ávila
- Autonomous community: Castile and León
- Population: ▲159,887 (2025)
- Electorate: ▼136,195 (2026)
- Major settlements: Ávila

Current constituency
- Created: 1983
- Seats: 7
- Members: PP (3); PSOE (2); Vox (1); XAV (1)

Ávila is one of the nine constituencies (Spanish: circunscripciones) represented in the Cortes of Castile and León, the regional legislature of the Autonomous Community of Castile and León. The constituency currently elects seven deputies. Its boundaries correspond to those of the Spanish province of Ávila. The electoral system uses the D'Hondt method and closed-list proportional representation, with a minimum threshold of three percent.

== Electoral system ==
The constituency was created as per the Statute of Autonomy of Castile and León of 1983 and was first contested in the 1983 regional election. The Statute provided for the nine provinces in Castile and León—Ávila, Burgos, León, Palencia, Salamanca, Segovia, Soria, Valladolid and Zamora—to be established as multi-member districts in the Cortes of Castile and León, with this regulation being maintained under the 1987 regional electoral law. Each constituency is entitled to an initial minimum of three seats, with one additional member per each 45,000 inhabitants or fraction greater than 22,500.

Voting is on the basis of universal suffrage, which comprises all nationals over eighteen, registered in Castile and León and in full enjoyment of their political rights. Amendments to the electoral law in 2011 required for Castilian-Leonese people abroad to apply for voting before being permitted to vote, a system known as "begged" or expat vote (Spanish: Voto rogado) which was abolished in 2022. Seats are elected using the D'Hondt method and a closed list proportional representation, with an electoral threshold of three percent of valid votes—which includes blank ballots—being applied in each constituency. The use of the D'Hondt method might result in a higher effective threshold, depending on the district magnitude.

The electoral law allows for parties and federations registered in the interior ministry, coalitions and groupings of electors to present lists of candidates. Parties and federations intending to form a coalition ahead of an election are required to inform the relevant Electoral Commission within ten days of the election call—fifteen before 1985—whereas groupings of electors need to secure the signature of at least one percent of the electorate in the constituencies for which they seek election—one-thousandth of the electorate, with a compulsory minimum of 500 signatures, until 1985—disallowing electors from signing for more than one list of candidates.

== Procurators ==
Procurators 1983–present
Key to parties PSOE CDS Cs XAV PP CP AP Vox
Cortes	Election	Distribution
1st	1983	2 / 2 / 3
2nd	1987	2 / 3 / 2
3rd	1991	2 / 2 / 3
4th	1995	2 / 5
5th	1999	2 / 5
6th	2003	2 / 5
7th	2007	2 / 5
8th	2011	2 / 5
9th	2015	2 / 1 / 4
10th	2019	2 / 1 / 1 / 3
11th	2022	2 / 1 / 3 / 1
12th	2026	2 / 1 / 3 / 1

== Regional elections ==
=== 2026 ===
Summary of the 15 March 2026 Cortes of Castile and León election results in Ávila
Parties and alliances	Popular vote			Seats	
Parties and alliances	Votes	%	±pp	Total	+/−
People's Party (PP)	29,550	36.06	+2.03	3	±0
Spanish Socialist Workers' Party (PSOE)	20,274	24.74	+0.53	2	±0
Vox (Vox)	15,814	19.30	+1.87	1	±0
For Ávila (XAV)	11,372	13.88	–2.86	1	±0
United Left, Unite Movement, Greens Equo: In Common (IU–MS–VQ)^{1}	1,208	1.47	n/a	0	±0
The Party is Over (SALF)	1,120	1.37	New	0	±0
We Can–Green Alliance CyL 2026 (Podemos–AV)^{1}	557	0.68	n/a	0	±0
Animalist Party with the Environment (PACMA)^{2}	299	0.36	–0.09	0	±0
Citizens–Party of the Citizenry (Cs)	239	0.29	–2.07	0	±0
Blank Seats to Leave Empty Seats (EB)	199	0.24	New	0	±0
Castilian Party–Commoners' Land (PCAS–TC)	153	0.19	–0.05	0	±0
Spanish Phalanx of the CNSO (FE de las JONS)	150	0.18	+0.08	0	±0
Nine Castile and León (NueveCyL)	118	0.14	New	0	±0
Blank ballots	903	1.10	+0.33		
Total	81,956			7	±0
Valid votes	81,956	98.63	–0.22		
Invalid votes	1,137	1.37	+0.22		
Votes cast / turnout	83,093	61.01	+0.79		
Abstentions	53,112	38.99	–0.79		
Registered voters	136,205				
Sources
Footnotes: ^{1} Within the United We Can Castile and León alliance in the 2022 election.; ^{2} Animalist Party with the Environment results are compared to Animalist Party Against Mistreatment of Animals totals in the 2022 election.

=== 2022 ===
Summary of the 13 February 2022 Cortes of Castile and León election results in Ávila
Parties and alliances	Popular vote			Seats	
Parties and alliances	Votes	%	±pp	Total	+/−
People's Party (PP)	27,865	34.03	–2.09	3	±0
Spanish Socialist Workers' Party (PSOE)	19,826	24.21	–4.04	2	±0
Vox (Vox)	14,275	17.43	+11.76	1	+1
For Ávila (XAV)	13,703	16.74	+7.14	1	±0
United We Can Castile and León (Podemos–IU–AV)^{1}	3,007	3.67	–1.50	0	±0
Citizens–Party of the Citizenry (Cs)	1,932	2.36	–10.66	0	–1
Animalist Party Against Mistreatment of Animals (PACMA)	371	0.45	–0.14	0	±0
Castilian Party–Commoners' Land–Zero Cuts (PCAS–TC–RC)	194	0.24	New	0	±0
Spanish Phalanx of the CNSO (FE de las JONS)	79	0.10	–0.04	0	±0
Blank ballots	627	0.77	–0.11		
Total	81,879			7	±0
Valid votes	81,879	98.85	–0.01		
Invalid votes	955	1.15	+0.01		
Votes cast / turnout	82,834	60.22	–12.49		
Abstentions	54,721	39.78	+12.49		
Registered voters	137,555				
Sources
Footnotes: ^{1} United We Can Castile and León results are compared to the combined totals of We Can–Equo and United Left–Anticapitalists in the 2019 election.

=== 2019 ===
Summary of the 26 May 2019 Cortes of Castile and León election results in Ávila
Parties and alliances	Popular vote			Seats	
Parties and alliances	Votes	%	±pp	Total	+/−
People's Party (PP)	35,566	36.12	–9.17	3	–1
Spanish Socialist Workers' Party (PSOE)	27,821	28.25	+6.20	2	±0
Citizens–Party of the Citizenry (Cs)	12,818	13.02	+1.07	1	±0
For Ávila (XAV)	9,455	9.60	New	1	+1
Vox (Vox)	5,582	5.67	+4.77	0	±0
We Can–Equo (Podemos–Equo)	3,796	3.85	–6.24	0	±0
United Left–Anticapitalists (IU–Anticapitalistas–PCAS/TC–ALTER)	1,296	1.32	–2.64	0	±0
Animalist Party Against Mistreatment of Animals (PACMA)	584	0.59	–0.25	0	±0
Ávila Free of Tolls (ÁvilaLP)	552	0.56	New	0	±0
Spanish Phalanx of the CNSO (FE de las JONS)	133	0.14	–0.33	0	±0
Blank ballots	870	0.88	–1.35		
Total	98,473			7	±0
Valid votes	98,473	98.86	+1.28		
Invalid votes	1,138	1.14	–1.28		
Votes cast / turnout	99,611	72.71	+2.91		
Abstentions	37,392	27.29	–2.91		
Registered voters	137,003				

=== 2015 ===
Summary of the 24 May 2015 Cortes of Castile and León election results in Ávila
Parties and alliances	Popular vote			Seats	
Parties and alliances	Votes	%	±pp	Total	+/−
People's Party (PP)	43,434	45.29	–13.78	4	–1
Spanish Socialist Workers' Party (PSOE)	21,149	22.05	–1.70	2	±0
Citizens–Party of the Citizenry (C's)	11,456	11.95	New	1	+1
We Can (Podemos)	9,675	10.09	New	0	±0
United Left–Equo: Convergence for Castile and León (IU–Equo)	3,796	3.96	–1.32	0	±0
Union, Progress and Democracy (UPyD)	2,133	2.22	–3.49	0	±0
Vox (Vox)	864	0.90	New	0	±0
Animalist Party Against Mistreatment of Animals (PACMA)	803	0.84	+0.40	0	±0
Spanish Phalanx of the CNSO (FE de las JONS)	449	0.47	+0.01	0	±0
Blank ballots	2,140	2.23	–0.55		
Total	95,899			7	±0
Valid votes	95,899	97.58	–0.37		
Invalid votes	2,374	2.42	+0.37		
Votes cast / turnout	98,273	69.80	–3.51		
Abstentions	42,528	30.20	+3.51		
Registered voters	140,801				

=== 2011 ===
Summary of the 22 May 2011 Cortes of Castile and León election results in Ávila
Parties and alliances	Popular vote			Seats	
Parties and alliances	Votes	%	±pp	Total	+/−
People's Party (PP)	60,577	59.07	+0.17	5	±0
Spanish Socialist Workers' Party (PSOE)	24,354	23.75	–8.54	2	±0
Union, Progress and Democracy (UPyD)	5,852	5.71	New	0	±0
United Left of Castile and León (IUCyL)	5,415	5.28	+1.36	0	±0
The Party of Castile and León–Independent Candidacy (PCL–CI)	2,333	2.28	+0.73	0	±0
Spanish Phalanx of the CNSO (FE de las JONS)	468	0.46	New	0	±0
Anti-Bullfighting Party Against Mistreatment of Animals (PACMA)	456	0.44	New	0	±0
Family and Life Party (PFyV)	238	0.23	New	0	±0
Blank ballots	2,852	2.78	+1.00		
Total	102,545			7	±0
Valid votes	102,545	97.95	–1.09		
Invalid votes	2,147	2.05	+1.09		
Votes cast / turnout	104,692	73.31	–2.05		
Abstentions	38,116	26.69	+2.05		
Registered voters	142,808				

=== 2007 ===
Summary of the 27 May 2007 Cortes of Castile and León election results in Ávila
Parties and alliances	Popular vote			Seats	
Parties and alliances	Votes	%	±pp	Total	+/−
People's Party (PP)	63,328	58.90	–0.51	5	±0
Spanish Socialist Workers' Party (PSOE)	34,715	32.29	+0.15	2	±0
United Left–The Greens–Commitment for Castile and León (IU–LV–CyL)	4,211	3.92	–0.09	0	±0
Independent Candidacy–The Party of Castile and León (CI–PCL)	1,667	1.55	New	0	±0
Commoners' Land–Alternative for Castile and León (TC–ACAL)	1,141	1.06	–0.16	0	±0
Authentic Phalanx (FA)	290	0.27	+0.05	0	±0
The Phalanx (FE)	265	0.25	–0.02	0	±0
Blank ballots	1,909	1.78	–0.15		
Total	107,526			7	±0
Valid votes	107,526	99.04	+0.09		
Invalid votes	1,040	0.96	–0.09		
Votes cast / turnout	108,566	75.36	–2.00		
Abstentions	35,506	24.64	+2.00		
Registered voters	144,072				

=== 2003 ===
Summary of the 25 May 2003 Cortes of Castile and León election results in Ávila
Parties and alliances	Popular vote			Seats	
Parties and alliances	Votes	%	±pp	Total	+/−
People's Party (PP)	65,496	59.41	–2.95	5	±0
Spanish Socialist Workers' Party (PSOE)	35,439	32.14	+5.19	2	±0
United Left of Castile and León (IUCyL)	4,422	4.01	–2.40	0	±0
Commoners' Land–Castilian Nationalist Party (TC–PNC)	1,343	1.22	+0.79	0	±0
The Phalanx (FE)	303	0.27	New	0	±0
Castilian Left (IzCa)	293	0.27	New	0	±0
Humanist Party (PH)	293	0.27	New	0	±0
Republican Left (IR)	285	0.26	New	0	±0
Authentic Phalanx (FA)	243	0.22	New	0	±0
Blank ballots	2,132	1.93	–0.47		
Total	110,249			7	±0
Valid votes	110,249	98.95	+0.12		
Invalid votes	1,171	1.05	–0.12		
Votes cast / turnout	111,420	77.36	+4.15		
Abstentions	32,610	22.64	–4.15		
Registered voters	144,030				

=== 1999 ===
Summary of the 13 June 1999 Cortes of Castile and León election results in Ávila
Parties and alliances	Popular vote			Seats	
Parties and alliances	Votes	%	±pp	Total	+/−
People's Party (PP)	66,148	62.36	+4.01	5	±0
Spanish Socialist Workers' Party (PSOE)	28,585	26.95	+3.14	2	±0
United Left of Castile and León (IUCyL)	6,801	6.41	–1.81	0	±0
Party of Self-employed of Spain and Spanish Independent Groups (PAE–I)	565	0.53	New	0	±0
Regionalist Unity of Castile and León (URCL)	495	0.47	New	0	±0
Spanish Phalanx of the CNSO (FE–JONS)	478	0.45	+0.10	0	±0
Commoners' Land–Castilian Nationalist Party (TC–PNC)	453	0.43	–0.01	0	±0
Blank ballots	2,550	2.40	+1.05		
Total	106,075			7	±0
Valid votes	106,075	98.83	–0.21		
Invalid votes	1,257	1.17	+0.21		
Votes cast / turnout	107,332	73.21	–4.64		
Abstentions	39,281	26.79	+4.64		
Registered voters	146,613				

=== 1995 ===
Summary of the 28 May 1995 Cortes of Castile and León election results in Ávila
Parties and alliances	Popular vote			Seats	
Parties and alliances	Votes	%	±pp	Total	+/−
People's Party (PP)	64,624	58.35	+16.03	5	+2
Spanish Socialist Workers' Party (PSOE)	26,373	23.81	–2.53	2	±0
United Left of Castile and León (IU)	9,104	8.22	+4.62	0	±0
Independent Group of Ávila (AIAV)	8,159	7.37	New	0	±0
Commoners' Land–Castilian Nationalist Party (TC–PNC)	487	0.44	New	0	±0
Spanish Phalanx of the CNSO (FE–JONS)	393	0.35	+0.10	0	±0
Party of El Bierzo (PB)	121	0.11	New	0	±0
Democratic and Social Centre (CDS)	n/a	n/a	–24.83	0	–2
Blank ballots	1,490	1.35	+0.28		
Total	110,751			7	±0
Valid votes	110,751	99.04	–0.03		
Invalid votes	1,071	0.96	+0.03		
Votes cast / turnout	111,822	77.85	+4.31		
Abstentions	31,820	22.15	–4.31		
Registered voters	143,642				

=== 1991 ===
Summary of the 26 May 1991 Cortes of Castile and León election results in Ávila
Parties and alliances	Popular vote			Seats	
Parties and alliances	Votes	%	±pp	Total	+/−
People's Party (PP)^{1}	44,593	42.32	+10.12	3	+1
Spanish Socialist Workers' Party (PSOE)	27,753	26.34	+2.84	2	±0
Democratic and Social Centre (CDS)	26,164	24.83	–15.75	2	–1
United Left (IU)	3,792	3.60	+1.15	0	±0
The Greens (LV)	1,681	1.60	New	0	±0
Spanish Phalanx of the CNSO (FE–JONS)	265	0.25	New	0	±0
Blank ballots	1,132	1.07	±0.00		
Total	105,380			7	±0
Valid votes	105,380	99.07	+0.24		
Invalid votes	985	0.93	–0.24		
Votes cast / turnout	106,365	73.54	–2.34		
Abstentions	38,267	26.46	+2.34		
Registered voters	144,632				
Sources
Footnotes: ^{1} People's Party results are compared to the combined totals of People's Alliance and People's Democratic Party in the 1987 election.

=== 1987 ===
Summary of the 10 June 1987 Cortes of Castile and León election results in Ávila
Parties and alliances	Popular vote			Seats	
Parties and alliances	Votes	%	±pp	Total	+/−
Democratic and Social Centre (CDS)	43,099	40.58	+17.24	3	+1
People's Alliance (AP)^{1}	32,209	30.33	n/a	2	–1
Spanish Socialist Workers' Party (PSOE)	24,960	23.50	–7.86	2	±0
United Left (IU)^{2}	2,606	2.45	–0.76	0	±0
People's Democratic Party (PDP)^{1}	1,991	1.87	n/a	0	±0
Workers' Party of Spain–Communist Unity (PTE–UC)	387	0.36	New	0	±0
Blank ballots	1,139	1.07	+0.32		
Total	106,391			7	±0
Valid votes	106,391	98.83	+0.14		
Invalid votes	1,255	1.17	–0.14		
Votes cast / turnout	107,646	75.88	+3.03		
Abstentions	34,226	24.12	–3.03		
Registered voters	141,872				
Sources
Footnotes: ^{1} Within the People's Coalition alliance in the 1983 election.; ^{2} United Left results are compared to Communist Party of Spain totals in the 1983 election.

=== 1983 ===
Summary of the 8 May 1983 Cortes of Castile and León election results in Ávila
Parties and alliances	Popular vote			Seats	
Parties and alliances	Votes	%	±pp	Total	+/−
People's Coalition (AP–PDP–UL)	43,164	41.34	n/a	3	n/a
Spanish Socialist Workers' Party (PSOE)	32,741	31.36	n/a	2	n/a
Democratic and Social Centre (CDS)	24,366	23.34	n/a	2	n/a
Communist Party of Castile and León (PCCL–PCE)	3,344	3.21	n/a	0	n/a
Blank ballots	788	0.75	n/a		
Total	104,403			7	n/a
Valid votes	104,403	98.69	n/a		
Invalid votes	1,386	1.31	n/a		
Votes cast / turnout	105,789	72.85	n/a		
Abstentions	39,426	27.15	n/a		
Registered voters	145,215				
