= Salamanca (Cortes of Castile and León constituency) =

Coordinates: 40°50′N 6°00′W

- Cortes of Castile and León; Electoral constituency
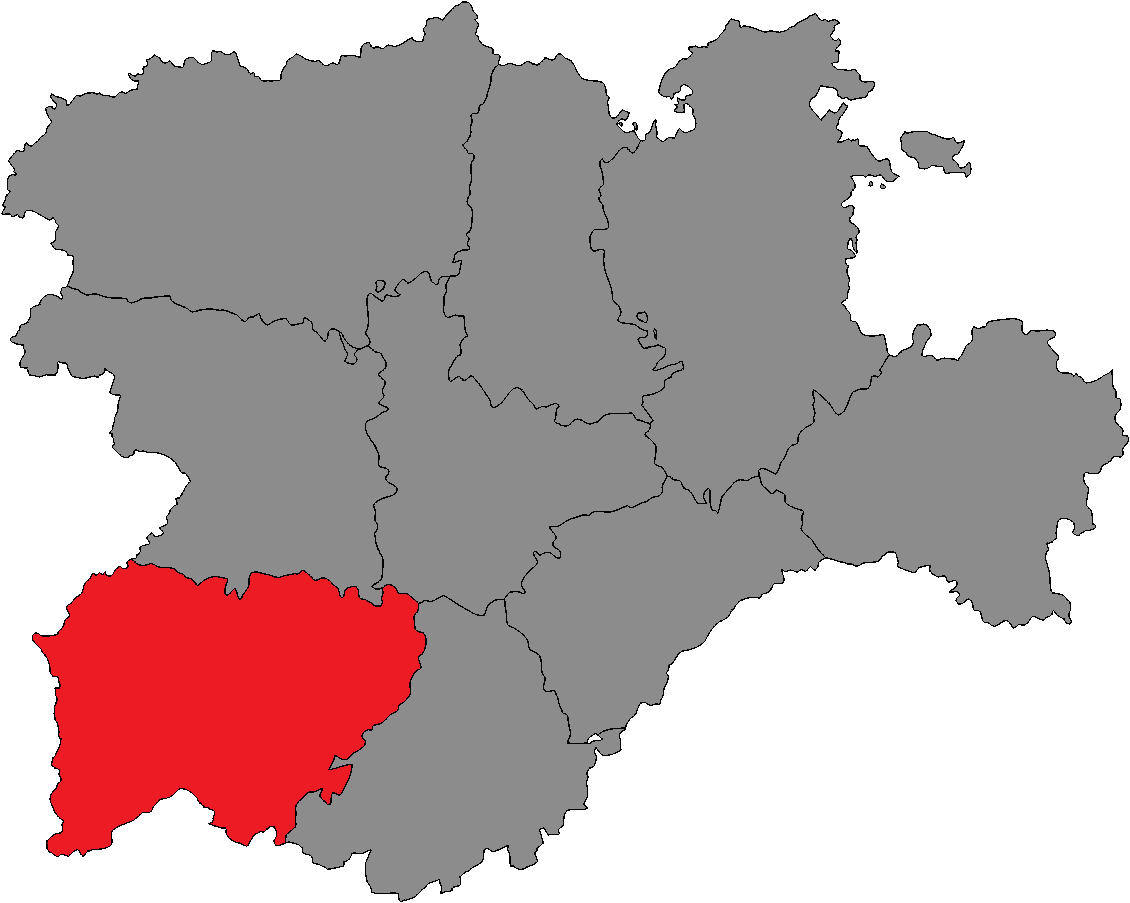
- Location of Salamanca within Castile and León
- Province: Salamanca
- Autonomous community: Castile and León
- Population: ▲328,779 (2025)
- Electorate: ▼303,191 (2026)
- Major settlements: Salamanca

Current constituency
- Created: 1983
- Seats: 11 (1983–2019); 10 (2019–present)
- Members: PP (5); PSOE (3); Vox (2)

Salamanca is one of the nine constituencies (Spanish: circunscripciones) represented in the Cortes of Castile and León, the regional legislature of the Autonomous Community of Castile and León. The constituency currently elects 11 deputies. Its boundaries correspond to those of the Spanish province of Salamanca. The electoral system uses the D'Hondt method and closed-list proportional representation, with a minimum threshold of three percent.

== Electoral system ==
The constituency was created as per the Statute of Autonomy of Castile and León of 1983 and was first contested in the 1983 regional election. The Statute provided for the nine provinces in Castile and León—Ávila, Burgos, León, Palencia, Salamanca, Segovia, Soria, Valladolid and Zamora—to be established as multi-member districts in the Cortes of Castile and León, with this regulation being maintained under the 1987 regional electoral law. Each constituency is entitled to an initial minimum of three seats, with one additional member per each 45,000 inhabitants or fraction greater than 22,500.

Voting is on the basis of universal suffrage, which comprises all nationals over eighteen, registered in Castile and León and in full enjoyment of their political rights. Amendments to the electoral law in 2011 required for Castilian-Leonese people abroad to apply for voting before being permitted to vote, a system known as "begged" or expat vote (Spanish: Voto rogado) which was abolished in 2022. Seats are elected using the D'Hondt method and a closed list proportional representation, with an electoral threshold of three percent of valid votes—which includes blank ballots—being applied in each constituency. The use of the D'Hondt method might result in a higher effective threshold, depending on the district magnitude.

The electoral law allows for parties and federations registered in the interior ministry, coalitions and groupings of electors to present lists of candidates. Parties and federations intending to form a coalition ahead of an election are required to inform the relevant Electoral Commission within ten days of the election call—fifteen before 1985—whereas groupings of electors need to secure the signature of at least one percent of the electorate in the constituencies for which they seek election—one-thousandth of the electorate, with a compulsory minimum of 500 signatures, until 1985—disallowing electors from signing for more than one list of candidates.

== Procurators ==
Procurators 1983–present
Key to parties IU Podemos PSOE CDS Cs PP CP AP Vox
Cortes	Election	Distribution
1st	1983	6 / 5
2nd	1987	4 / 3 / 4
3rd	1991	5 / 1 / 5
4th	1995	1 / 4 / 6
5th	1999	4 / 7
6th	2003	4 / 7
7th	2007	4 / 7
8th	2011	4 / 7
9th	2015	1 / 3 / 1 / 6
10th	2019	4 / 2 / 4
11th	2022	3 / 5 / 2
12th	2026	3 / 5 / 2

== Regional elections ==
=== 2026 ===
Summary of the 15 March 2026 Cortes of Castile and León election results in Salamanca
Parties and alliances	Popular vote			Seats	
Parties and alliances	Votes	%	±pp	Total	+/−
People's Party (PP)	74,060	42.78	+4.01	5	±0
Spanish Socialist Workers' Party (PSOE)	50,665	29.26	–0.31	3	±0
Vox (Vox)	32,487	18.76	+0.72	2	±0
Leonese People's Union (UPL)	2,667	1.54	+0.57	0	±0
The Party is Over (SALF)	2,132	1.23	New	0	±0
United Left, Unite Movement, Greens Equo: In Common (IU–MS–VQ)^{1}	1,956	1.13	n/a	0	±0
Nine Castile and León (NueveCyL)	1,855	1.07	New	0	±0
We Can–Green Alliance CyL 2026 (Podemos–AV)^{1}	1,143	0.66	n/a	0	±0
Citizens–Party of the Citizenry (Cs)	798	0.46	–4.49	0	±0
Empty Spain (España Vaciada)	665	0.38	–1.53	0	±0
Animalist Party with the Environment (PACMA)^{2}	601	0.35	–0.16	0	±0
Blank Seats to Leave Empty Seats (EB)	507	0.29	New	0	±0
Regionalist Party of the Leonese Country (PREPAL)	311	0.18	±0.00	0	±0
Communist Party of the Workers of Spain (PCTE)	263	0.15	+0.03	0	±0
For a Fairer World (M+J)	261	0.15	–0.06	0	±0
Castilian Party–Commoners' Land (PCAS–TC)	135	0.08	+0.01	0	±0
Blank ballots	2,632	1.52	+0.52		
Total	173,138			10	±0
Valid votes	173,138	98.67	–0.21		
Invalid votes	2,332	1.33	+0.21		
Votes cast / turnout	175,470	57.87	+1.50		
Abstentions	127,731	42.13	–1.50		
Registered voters	303,201				
Sources
Footnotes: ^{1} Within the United We Can Castile and León alliance in the 2022 election.; ^{2} Animalist Party with the Environment results are compared to Animalist Party Against Mistreatment of Animals totals in the 2022 election.

=== 2022 ===
Summary of the 13 February 2022 Cortes of Castile and León election results in Salamanca
Parties and alliances	Popular vote			Seats	
Parties and alliances	Votes	%	±pp	Total	+/−
People's Party (PP)	65,277	38.77	+0.25	5	+1
Spanish Socialist Workers' Party (PSOE)	49,795	29.57	–3.77	3	–1
Vox (Vox)	30,370	18.04	+13.25	2	+2
Citizens–Party of the Citizenry (Cs)	8,334	4.95	–10.60	0	–2
United We Can Castile and León (Podemos–IU–AV)^{1}	5,832	3.46	–1.89	0	±0
Empty Spain (España Vaciada)	3,219	1.91	New	0	±0
Leonese People's Union (UPL)	1,631	0.97	+0.66	0	±0
Animalist Party Against Mistreatment of Animals (PACMA)	856	0.51	–0.05	0	±0
For a Fairer World (PUM+J)	350	0.21	New	0	±0
Regionalist Party of the Leonese Country (PREPAL)	299	0.18	–0.05	0	±0
Volt Spain (Volt)	273	0.16	New	0	±0
Communist Party of the Workers of Spain (PCTE)	199	0.12	New	0	±0
You Contribute (TAB)	149	0.09	New	0	±0
Castilian Party–Commoners' Land–Zero Cuts (PCAS–TC–RC)	123	0.07	New	0	±0
Blank ballots	1,684	1.00	–0.02		
Total	168,391			10	±0
Valid votes	168,391	98.88	–0.14		
Invalid votes	1,903	1.12	+0.14		
Votes cast / turnout	170,294	56.37	–6.57		
Abstentions	131,785	43.63	+6.57		
Registered voters	302,079				
Sources
Footnotes: ^{1} United We Can Castile and León results are compared to the combined totals of We Can–Equo and United Left–Anticapitalists in the 2019 election.

=== 2019 ===
Summary of the 26 May 2019 Cortes of Castile and León election results in Salamanca
Parties and alliances	Popular vote			Seats	
Parties and alliances	Votes	%	±pp	Total	+/−
People's Party (PP)	73,431	38.52	–2.99	4	–2
Spanish Socialist Workers' Party (PSOE)	63,556	33.34	+8.05	4	+1
Citizens–Party of the Citizenry (Cs)	29,648	15.55	+2.28	2	+1
Vox (Vox)	9,137	4.79	+4.02	0	±0
We Can–Equo (Podemos–Equo)	7,652	4.01	–6.75	0	–1
United Left–Anticapitalists (IU–Anticapitalistas–PCAS/TC–ALTER)^{1}	2,554	1.34	–1.88	0	±0
Animalist Party Against Mistreatment of Animals (PACMA)	1,059	0.56	–0.20	0	±0
With You, We Are Democracy (Contigo)	614	0.32	New	0	±0
Leonese People's Union (UPL)	594	0.31	New	0	±0
Regionalist Party of the Leonese Country (PREPAL)	441	0.23	–0.06	0	±0
Blank ballots	1,942	1.02	–1.42		
Total	190,628			10	–1
Valid votes	190,628	99.02	+1.10		
Invalid votes	1,884	0.98	–1.10		
Votes cast / turnout	192,512	62.94	+1.18		
Abstentions	113,343	37.06	–1.18		
Registered voters	305,855				
Sources
Footnotes: ^{1} United Left–Anticapitalists results are compared to the combined totals of United Left–Equo: Convergence for Castile and León and Castilian Party–Commoners' Land: Pact in the 2015 election.

=== 2015 ===
Summary of the 24 May 2015 Cortes of Castile and León election results in Salamanca
Parties and alliances	Popular vote			Seats	
Parties and alliances	Votes	%	±pp	Total	+/−
People's Party (PP)	77,915	41.51	–15.23	6	–1
Spanish Socialist Workers' Party (PSOE)	47,479	25.29	–3.87	3	–1
Citizens–Party of the Citizenry (C's)^{1}	24,909	13.27	+11.41	1	+1
We Can (Podemos)	20,207	10.76	New	1	+1
United Left–Equo: Convergence for Castile and León (IU–Equo)	5,612	2.99	–0.23	0	±0
Union, Progress and Democracy (UPyD)	2,807	1.50	–1.46	0	±0
Vox (Vox)	1,444	0.77	New	0	±0
Animalist Party Against Mistreatment of Animals (PACMA)	1,429	0.76	+0.45	0	±0
Regionalist Party of the Leonese Country (PREPAL)	539	0.29	–0.02	0	±0
Castilian Party–Commoners' Land: Pact (PCAS–TC–Pacto)	430	0.23	+0.06	0	±0
Communist Party of the Peoples of Spain (PCPE)	370	0.20	New	0	±0
Blank ballots	4,577	2.44	–0.69		
Total	187,718			11	±0
Valid votes	187,718	97.92	–0.23		
Invalid votes	3,983	2.08	+0.23		
Votes cast / turnout	191,701	61.76	–3.55		
Abstentions	118,704	38.24	+3.55		
Registered voters	310,405				
Sources
Footnotes: ^{1} Citizens–Party of the Citizenry results are compared to Yes for Salamanca totals in the 2011 election.

=== 2011 ===
Summary of the 22 May 2011 Cortes of Castile and León election results in Salamanca
Parties and alliances	Popular vote			Seats	
Parties and alliances	Votes	%	±pp	Total	+/−
People's Party (PP)	113,517	56.74	+3.74	7	±0
Spanish Socialist Workers' Party (PSOE)	58,339	29.16	–8.44	4	±0
United Left of Castile and León (IUCyL)	6,449	3.22	+0.98	0	±0
Union, Progress and Democracy (UPyD)	5,924	2.96	New	0	±0
Yes for Salamanca (UPSa–C's)^{1}	3,718	1.86	–1.86	0	±0
Greens of Salamanca (LV)	2,822	1.41	New	0	±0
Citizens for Blank Votes (CenB)	1,063	0.53	New	0	±0
Regionalist Party of the Leonese Country (PREPAL)	628	0.31	+0.03	0	±0
Anti-Bullfighting Party Against Mistreatment of Animals (PACMA)	625	0.31	New	0	±0
Regionalist Unity of Castile and León (URCL)	361	0.18	New	0	±0
Party of Castile and León (PCAL)^{2}	337	0.17	–0.03	0	±0
Blank ballots	6,266	3.13	+1.24		
Total	200,049			11	±0
Valid votes	200,049	98.15	–1.06		
Invalid votes	3,764	1.85	+1.06		
Votes cast / turnout	203,813	65.31	–4.07		
Abstentions	108,280	34.69	+4.07		
Registered voters	312,093				
Sources
Footnotes: ^{1} Yes for Salamanca results are compared to Union of the Salamancan People totals in the 2007 election.; ^{2} Party of Castile and León results are compared to Commoners' Land–Alternative for Castile and León totals in the 2007 election.

=== 2007 ===
Summary of the 27 May 2007 Cortes of Castile and León election results in Salamanca
Parties and alliances	Popular vote			Seats	
Parties and alliances	Votes	%	±pp	Total	+/−
People's Party (PP)	113,509	53.00	+1.29	7	±0
Spanish Socialist Workers' Party (PSOE)	80,523	37.60	+0.81	4	±0
Union of the Salamancan People (UPSa)	7,965	3.72	+0.69	0	±0
United Left–The Greens–Commitment for Castile and León (IU–LV–CyL)	4,802	2.24	+0.20	0	±0
The Greens of Europe (LVE)	1,271	0.59	New	0	±0
Regionalist Party of the Leonese Country (PREPAL)	603	0.28	+0.05	0	±0
Commoners' Land–Alternative for Castile and León (TC–ACAL)	429	0.20	+0.06	0	±0
National Democracy (DN)	421	0.20	New	0	±0
Communist Party of the Castilian People (PCPC)	310	0.14	New	0	±0
Republican Left (IR)	292	0.14	+0.06	0	±0
Blank ballots	4,043	1.89	–0.02		
Total	214,168			11	±0
Valid votes	214,168	99.21	–0.02		
Invalid votes	1,712	0.79	+0.02		
Votes cast / turnout	215,880	69.38	–1.38		
Abstentions	95,282	30.62	+1.38		
Registered voters	311,162				

=== 2003 ===
Summary of the 25 May 2003 Cortes of Castile and León election results in Salamanca
Parties and alliances	Popular vote			Seats	
Parties and alliances	Votes	%	±pp	Total	+/−
People's Party (PP)	113,026	51.71	–3.20	7	±0
Spanish Socialist Workers' Party (PSOE)	80,401	36.79	+2.72	4	±0
Union of the Salamancan People (UPSa)	6,630	3.03	New	0	±0
United Left of Castile and León (IUCyL)	4,462	2.04	–1.84	0	±0
The Greens–Left Forum (LV–FI)	4,130	1.89	New	0	±0
Regionalist Unity of Castile and León (URCL)	4,039	1.85	–0.54	0	±0
Salamancan People for Salamanca–PREPAL (PREPAL)	513	0.23	–0.29	0	±0
The Phalanx (FE)	377	0.17	New	0	±0
Castilian Left (IzCa)	335	0.15	New	0	±0
Commoners' Land–Castilian Nationalist Party (TC–PNC)	298	0.14	–0.14	0	±0
Republican Left (IR)	173	0.08	New	0	±0
Blank ballots	4,174	1.91	–0.74		
Total	218,558			11	±0
Valid votes	218,558	99.23	+0.09		
Invalid votes	1,705	0.77	–0.09		
Votes cast / turnout	220,263	70.76	+4.75		
Abstentions	91,007	29.24	–4.75		
Registered voters	311,270				

=== 1999 ===
Summary of the 13 June 1999 Cortes of Castile and León election results in Salamanca
Parties and alliances	Popular vote			Seats	
Parties and alliances	Votes	%	±pp	Total	+/−
People's Party (PP)	113,537	54.91	+0.61	7	+1
Spanish Socialist Workers' Party (PSOE)	70,449	34.07	+1.16	4	±0
United Left of Castile and León (IUCyL)	8,013	3.88	–4.38	0	–1
Regionalist Unity of Castile and León (URCL)	4,939	2.39	+1.05	0	±0
Independent Salamancan Union (USI)	1,851	0.90	New	0	±0
Salamanca–Zamora–León–PREPAL (PREPAL)	1,073	0.52	+0.04	0	±0
Commoners' Land–Castilian Nationalist Party (TC–PNC)	575	0.28	+0.07	0	±0
Spanish Democratic Party (PADE)	504	0.24	New	0	±0
Humanist Party (PH)	342	0.17	New	0	±0
Blank ballots	5,487	2.65	+0.94		
Total	206,770			11	±0
Valid votes	206,770	99.14	±0.00		
Invalid votes	1,801	0.86	±0.00		
Votes cast / turnout	208,571	66.01	–8.11		
Abstentions	107,383	33.99	+8.11		
Registered voters	315,954				

=== 1995 ===
Summary of the 28 May 1995 Cortes of Castile and León election results in Salamanca
Parties and alliances	Popular vote			Seats	
Parties and alliances	Votes	%	±pp	Total	+/−
People's Party (PP)	121,221	54.30	+9.82	6	+1
Spanish Socialist Workers' Party (PSOE)	73,457	32.91	–6.60	4	–1
United Left of Castile and León (IU)	18,428	8.26	+4.28	1	+1
Regionalist Unity of Castile and León (URCL)^{1}	2,982	1.34	+0.96	0	±0
Platform of Independents of Spain (PIE)	1,529	0.68	New	0	±0
Salamancan People for Salamanca–PREPAL (PREPAL)	1,078	0.48	–0.02	0	±0
Commoners' Land–Castilian Nationalist Party (TC–PNC)	472	0.21	New	0	±0
Party of El Bierzo (PB)	239	0.11	New	0	±0
Democratic and Social Centre (CDS)	n/a	n/a	–7.84	0	–1
Blank ballots	3,825	1.71	+0.32		
Total	223,231			11	±0
Valid votes	223,231	99.14	–0.11		
Invalid votes	1,940	0.86	+0.11		
Votes cast / turnout	225,171	74.12	+5.34		
Abstentions	78,602	25.88	–5.34		
Registered voters	303,773				
Sources
Footnotes: ^{1} Regionalist Unity of Castile and León results are compared to Regionalist Democracy of Castile and León totals in the 1991 election.

=== 1991 ===
Summary of the 26 May 1991 Cortes of Castile and León election results in Salamanca
Parties and alliances	Popular vote			Seats	
Parties and alliances	Votes	%	±pp	Total	+/−
People's Party (PP)^{1}	89,576	44.48	+8.40	5	+1
Spanish Socialist Workers' Party (PSOE)	79,562	39.51	+4.55	5	+1
Democratic and Social Centre (CDS)	15,798	7.84	–13.84	1	–2
United Left (IU)	8,020	3.98	+0.81	0	±0
The Greens (LV)	3,862	1.92	New	0	±0
Regionalist Party of the Leonese Country (PREPAL)	1,015	0.50	+0.02	0	±0
Regionalist Democracy of Castile and León (DRCL)	762	0.38	New	0	±0
Blank ballots	2,800	1.39	–0.93		
Total	201,395			11	±0
Valid votes	201,395	99.25	+1.44		
Invalid votes	1,521	0.75	–1.44		
Votes cast / turnout	202,916	68.78	–7.52		
Abstentions	92,123	31.22	+7.52		
Registered voters	295,039				
Sources
Footnotes: ^{1} People's Party results are compared to the combined totals of People's Alliance and People's Democratic Party in the 1987 election.

=== 1987 ===
Summary of the 10 June 1987 Cortes of Castile and León election results in Salamanca
Parties and alliances	Popular vote			Seats	
Parties and alliances	Votes	%	±pp	Total	+/−
People's Alliance (AP)^{1}	73,385	35.16	n/a	4	–1
Spanish Socialist Workers' Party (PSOE)	72,968	34.96	–14.79	4	–2
Democratic and Social Centre (CDS)	45,258	21.68	+17.93	3	+3
United Left (IU)^{2}	6,606	3.17	+1.41	0	±0
People's Democratic Party (PDP)^{1}	1,913	0.92	n/a	0	±0
Workers' Party of Spain–Communist Unity (PTE–UC)	1,021	0.49	New	0	±0
Regionalist Party of the Leonese Country (PREPAL)	1,012	0.48	–5.53	0	±0
Humanist Platform (PH)	842	0.40	New	0	±0
Spanish Phalanx of the CNSO (FE–JONS)	495	0.24	New	0	±0
Leonesist Union (UNLE)	372	0.18	New	0	±0
Blank ballots	4,845	2.32	+1.57		
Total	208,717			11	±0
Valid votes	208,717	97.81	–0.86		
Invalid votes	4,666	2.19	+0.86		
Votes cast / turnout	213,383	76.30	+3.40		
Abstentions	66,281	23.70	–3.40		
Registered voters	279,664				
Sources
Footnotes: ^{1} Within the People's Coalition alliance in the 1983 election.; ^{2} United Left results are compared to Communist Party of Spain totals in the 1983 election.

=== 1983 ===
Summary of the 8 May 1983 Cortes of Castile and León election results in Salamanca
Parties and alliances	Popular vote			Seats	
Parties and alliances	Votes	%	±pp	Total	+/−
Spanish Socialist Workers' Party (PSOE)	100,399	49.75	n/a	6	n/a
People's Coalition (AP–PDP–UL)	75,792	37.56	n/a	5	n/a
Agrarian Bloc–Regionalist Party of the Leonese Country (BAR–PREPAL)	12,122	6.01	n/a	0	n/a
Democratic and Social Centre (CDS)	7,561	3.75	n/a	0	n/a
Communist Party of Castile and León (PCCL–PCE)	3,554	1.76	n/a	0	n/a
Spanish Communist Workers' Party–Unified Communist Party (PCOE–PCEU)	848	0.42	n/a	0	n/a
Blank ballots	1,513	0.75	n/a		
Total	201,789			11	n/a
Valid votes	201,789	98.67	n/a		
Invalid votes	2,720	1.33	n/a		
Votes cast / turnout	204,509	72.90	n/a		
Abstentions	76,032	27.10	n/a		
Registered voters	280,541				
