= Zamora (Cortes of Castile and León constituency) =

Coordinates: 41°45′N 6°00′W

- Cortes of Castile and León; Electoral constituency
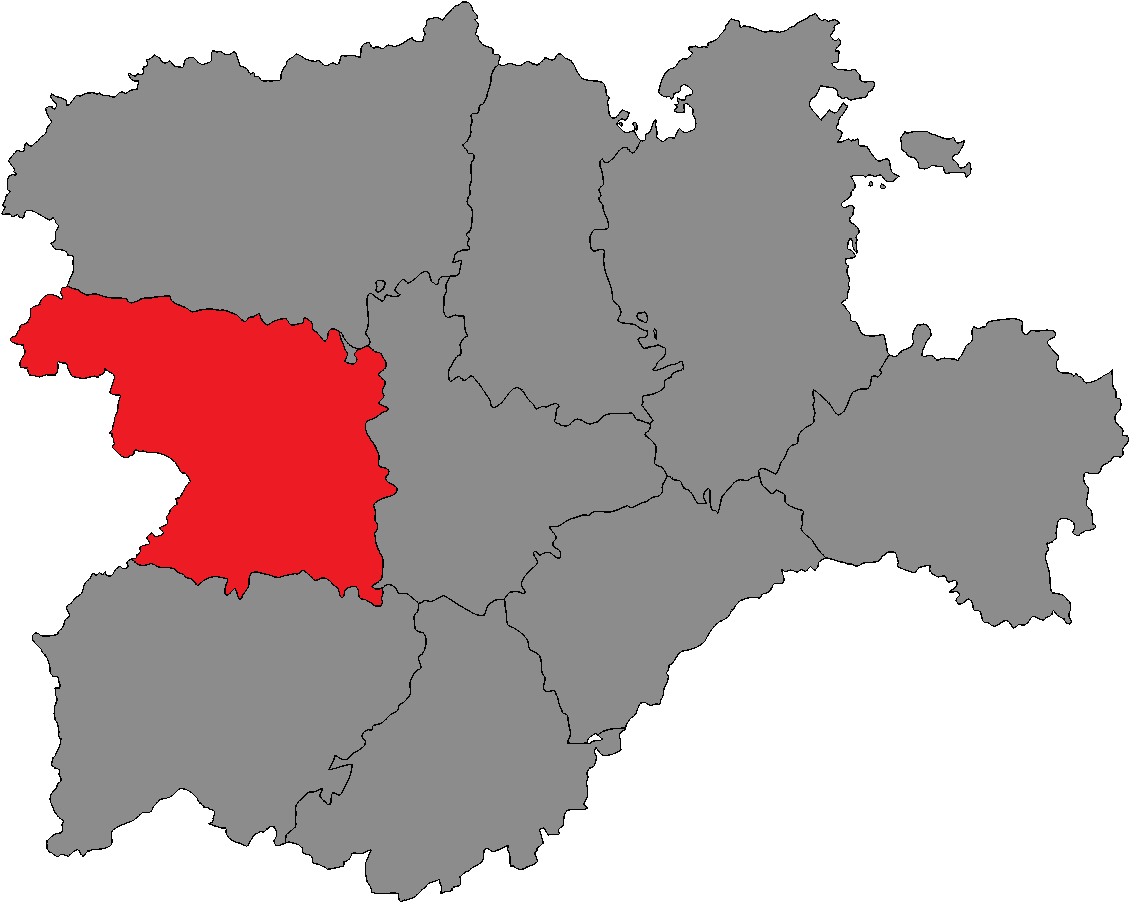
- Location of Zamora within Castile and León
- Province: Zamora
- Autonomous community: Castile and León
- Population: ▼165,275 (2025)
- Electorate: ▼162,155 (2026)
- Major settlements: Zamora, Benavente

Current constituency
- Created: 1983
- Seats: 8 (1983–2003); 7 (2003–present)
- Members: PP (3); PSOE (3); Vox (1)

Zamora is one of the nine constituencies (Spanish: circunscripciones) represented in the Cortes of Castile and León, the regional legislature of the Autonomous Community of Castile and León. The constituency currently elects seven deputies. Its boundaries correspond to those of the Spanish province of Zamora. The electoral system uses the D'Hondt method and closed-list proportional representation, with a minimum threshold of three percent.

== Electoral system ==
The constituency was created as per the Statute of Autonomy of Castile and León of 1983 and was first contested in the 1983 regional election. The Statute provided for the nine provinces in Castile and León—Ávila, Burgos, León, Palencia, Salamanca, Segovia, Soria, Valladolid and Zamora—to be established as multi-member districts in the Cortes of Castile and León, with this regulation being maintained under the 1987 regional electoral law. Each constituency is entitled to an initial minimum of three seats, with one additional member per each 45,000 inhabitants or fraction greater than 22,500.

Voting is on the basis of universal suffrage, which comprises all nationals over eighteen, registered in Castile and León and in full enjoyment of their political rights. Amendments to the electoral law in 2011 required for Castilian-Leonese people abroad to apply for voting before being permitted to vote, a system known as "begged" or expat vote (Spanish: Voto rogado) which was abolished in 2022. Seats are elected using the D'Hondt method and a closed list proportional representation, with an electoral threshold of three percent of valid votes—which includes blank ballots—being applied in each constituency. The use of the D'Hondt method might result in a higher effective threshold, depending on the district magnitude.

The electoral law allows for parties and federations registered in the interior ministry, coalitions and groupings of electors to present lists of candidates. Parties and federations intending to form a coalition ahead of an election are required to inform the relevant Electoral Commission within ten days of the election call—fifteen before 1985—whereas groupings of electors need to secure the signature of at least one percent of the electorate in the constituencies for which they seek election—one-thousandth of the electorate, with a compulsory minimum of 500 signatures, until 1985—disallowing electors from signing for more than one list of candidates.

== Procurators ==
Procurators 1983–present
Key to parties Podemos PSOE CDS Cs PP CP AP Vox
Cortes	Election	Distribution
1st	1983	4 / 4
2nd	1987	3 / 1 / 4
3rd	1991	3 / 1 / 4
4th	1995	3 / 5
5th	1999	3 / 5
6th	2003	3 / 4
7th	2007	3 / 4
8th	2011	2 / 5
9th	2015	1 / 2 / 4
10th	2019	3 / 1 / 3
11th	2022	3 / 3 / 1
12th	2026	3 / 3 / 1

== Regional elections ==
=== 2026 ===
Summary of the 15 March 2026 Cortes of Castile and León election results in Zamora
Parties and alliances	Popular vote			Seats	
Parties and alliances	Votes	%	±pp	Total	+/−
People's Party (PP)	33,438	37.96	+4.37	3	±0
Spanish Socialist Workers' Party (PSOE)	26,913	30.55	−2.10	3	±0
Vox (Vox)	17,563	19.94	+1.02	1	±0
Leonese People's Union (UPL)	2,498	2.84	+0.17	0	±0
United Left, Unite Movement, Greens Equo: In Common (IU–MS–VQ)^{1}	2,432	2.76	n/a	0	±0
Decide Now–Empty Spain (AD–EV)^{2}	1,000	1.14	−1.30	0	±0
The Party is Over (SALF)	916	1.04	New	0	±0
We Can–Green Alliance CyL 2026 (Podemos–AV)^{1}	457	0.52	n/a	0	±0
Regionalist Party of the Leonese Country (PREPAL)	333	0.38	+0.05	0	±0
Animalist Party with the Environment (PACMA)^{3}	258	0.29	−0.11	0	±0
Blank Seats to Leave Empty Seats (EB)	243	0.28	New	0	±0
Citizens–Party of the Citizenry (Cs)	208	0.24	−3.38	0	±0
Nine Castile and León (NueveCyL)	159	0.18	New	0	±0
Spanish Food Sovereignty (SAE)	123	0.14	New	0	±0
Castilian Party–Commoners' Land (PCAS–TC)	67	0.08	−0.04	0	±0
For a Fairer World (M+J)	61	0.07	New	0	±0
Blank ballots	1,417	1.61	+0.51		
Total	88,086			7	±0
Valid votes	88,086	98.61	−0.19		
Invalid votes	1,241	1.39	+0.19		
Votes cast / turnout	89,327	55.09	+1.81		
Abstentions	72,832	44.91	−1.81		
Registered voters	162,159				
Sources
Footnotes: ^{1} Within the United We Can Castile and León alliance in the 2022 election.; ^{2} Decide Now–Empty Spain results are compared to Zamora Decides totals in the 2022 election.; ^{3} Animalist Party with the Environment results are compared to Animalist Party Against Mistreatment of Animals totals in the 2022 election.

=== 2022 ===
Summary of the 13 February 2022 Cortes of Castile and León election results in Zamora
Parties and alliances	Popular vote			Seats	
Parties and alliances	Votes	%	±pp	Total	+/−
People's Party (PP)	29,228	33.59	–0.25	3	±0
Spanish Socialist Workers' Party (PSOE)	28,413	32.65	–3.55	3	±0
Vox (Vox)	16,463	18.92	+13.84	1	+1
Citizens–Party of the Citizenry (Cs)	3,147	3.62	–10.27	0	–1
United We Can Castile and León (Podemos–IU–AV)^{1}	2,810	3.23	–3.21	0	±0
Leonese People's Union (UPL)	2,323	2.67	+1.96	0	±0
Zamora Decides (Zamora Decide)^{2}	2,121	2.44	+0.73	0	±0
For Zamora (Por Zamora)	814	0.94	New	0	±0
Animalist Party Against Mistreatment of Animals (PACMA)	345	0.40	–0.11	0	±0
Regionalist Party of the Leonese Country (PREPAL)	290	0.33	–0.06	0	±0
Castilian Party–Commoners' Land–Zero Cuts (PCAS–TC–RC)	107	0.12	New	0	±0
Blank ballots	956	1.10	–0.17		
Total	87,017			7	±0
Valid votes	87,017	98.80	+0.03		
Invalid votes	1,055	1.20	–0.03		
Votes cast / turnout	88,072	53.28	–10.51		
Abstentions	77,235	46.72	+10.51		
Registered voters	165,307				
Sources
Footnotes: ^{1} United We Can Castile and León results are compared to the combined totals of We Can–Equo and United Left–Anticapitalists in the 2019 election.; ^{2} Zamora Decides results are compared to the Decide Now totals in the 2019 election.

=== 2019 ===
Summary of the 26 May 2019 Cortes of Castile and León election results in Zamora
Parties and alliances	Popular vote			Seats	
Parties and alliances	Votes	%	±pp	Total	+/−
Spanish Socialist Workers' Party (PSOE)	38,536	36.20	+10.67	3	+1
People's Party (PP)	36,019	33.84	–7.48	3	–1
Citizens–Party of the Citizenry (Cs)	14,788	13.89	+6.13	1	+1
Vox (Vox)	5,412	5.08	New	0	±0
We Can–Equo (Podemos–Equo)	3,710	3.49	–7.55	0	–1
United Left–Anticapitalists (IU–Anticapitalistas–PCAS/TC–ALTER)^{1}	3,143	2.95	–1.48	0	±0
Decide Now (Ahora Decide)^{2}	1,777	1.67	–2.46	0	±0
Leonese People's Union (UPL)	758	0.71	+0.03	0	±0
Animalist Party Against Mistreatment of Animals (PACMA)	543	0.51	±0.00	0	±0
Regionalist Party of the Leonese Country (PREPAL)	413	0.39	+0.06	0	±0
Blank ballots	1,355	1.27	–1.54		
Total	106,454			7	±0
Valid votes	106,454	98.77	+0.94		
Invalid votes	1,326	1.23	–0.94		
Votes cast / turnout	107,780	63.79	+0.08		
Abstentions	61,171	36.21	–0.08		
Registered voters	168,951				
Sources
Footnotes: ^{1} United Left–Anticapitalists results are compared to the combined totals of United Left–Equo: Convergence for Castile and León and Castilian Party–Commoners' Land: Pact in the 2015 election.; ^{2} Decide Now results are compared to the combined totals of Decide Now–Socialist Alternative and Zamoran Independent Electors in the 2015 election.

=== 2015 ===
Summary of the 24 May 2015 Cortes of Castile and León election results in Zamora
Parties and alliances	Popular vote			Seats	
Parties and alliances	Votes	%	±pp	Total	+/−
People's Party (PP)	45,225	41.32	–12.64	4	–1
Spanish Socialist Workers' Party (PSOE)	27,940	25.53	–5.13	2	±0
We Can (Podemos)	12,077	11.04	New	1	+1
Citizens–Party of the Citizenry (C's)	8,491	7.76	New	0	±0
United Left–Equo: Convergence for Castile and León (IU–Equo)	4,750	4.34	–0.31	0	±0
Decide Now–Socialist Alternative (Ahora Decide–AS)	2,285	2.09	New	0	±0
Zamoran Independent Electors (ADEIZA)	2,238	2.04	–0.81	0	±0
Union, Progress and Democracy (UPyD)	962	0.88	–1.17	0	±0
Leonese People's Union (UPL)	745	0.68	–0.56	0	±0
Cives (Cives)	628	0.57	New	0	±0
Animalist Party Against Mistreatment of Animals (PACMA)	562	0.51	New	0	±0
Regionalist Party of the Leonese Country (PREPAL)	364	0.33	–0.12	0	±0
Castilian Party–Commoners' Land: Pact (PCAS–TC–Pacto)	99	0.09	–0.07	0	±0
Blank ballots	3,074	2.81	–0.44		
Total	109,440			7	±0
Valid votes	109,440	97.83	–0.40		
Invalid votes	2,433	2.17	+0.40		
Votes cast / turnout	111,873	63.71	–2.98		
Abstentions	63,721	36.29	+2.98		
Registered voters	175,594				

=== 2011 ===
Summary of the 22 May 2011 Cortes of Castile and León election results in Zamora
Parties and alliances	Popular vote			Seats	
Parties and alliances	Votes	%	±pp	Total	+/−
People's Party (PP)	63,000	53.96	+2.81	5	+1
Spanish Socialist Workers' Party (PSOE)	35,796	30.66	–6.68	2	–1
United Left of Castile and León (IUCyL)	5,427	4.65	+1.99	0	±0
Zamoran Independent Electors–Zamoran People's Union (ADEIZA–UPZ)	3,322	2.85	+0.30	0	±0
Union, Progress and Democracy (UPyD)	2,388	2.05	New	0	±0
Leonese People's Union (UPL)^{1}	1,448	1.24	+0.66	0	±0
Citizens for Blank Votes (CenB)	852	0.73	New	0	±0
Regionalist Party of the Leonese Country (PREPAL)	525	0.45	–0.05	0	±0
Party of Castile and León (PCAL)^{2}	190	0.16	+0.03	0	±0
Blank ballots	3,795	3.25	+1.51		
Total	116,743			7	±0
Valid votes	116,743	98.23	–0.93		
Invalid votes	2,104	1.77	+0.93		
Votes cast / turnout	118,847	66.69	–4.36		
Abstentions	59,348	33.31	+4.36		
Registered voters	178,195				
Sources
Footnotes: ^{1} Leonese People's Union results are compared to United Zamora–Leonese People's Union totals in the 2007 election.; ^{2} Party of Castile and León results are compared to Commoners' Land–Alternative for Castile and León totals in the 2007 election.

=== 2007 ===
Summary of the 27 May 2007 Cortes of Castile and León election results in Zamora
Parties and alliances	Popular vote			Seats	
Parties and alliances	Votes	%	±pp	Total	+/−
People's Party (PP)	64,906	51.15	+0.33	4	±0
Spanish Socialist Workers' Party (PSOE)	47,386	37.34	+0.86	3	±0
United Left–The Greens–Commitment for Castile and León (IU–LV–CyL)	3,381	2.66	+0.12	0	±0
Zamoran Independent Electors–Zamoran People's Union (ADEIZA–UPZ)	3,241	2.55	+1.03	0	±0
Independent Candidacy–The Party of Castile and León (CI–PCL)	2,688	2.12	New	0	±0
United Zamora–Leonese People's Union (ZU–UPL)^{1}	738	0.58	–4.40	0	±0
Regionalist Party of the Leonese Country (PREPAL)	637	0.50	–0.04	0	±0
The Greens (LV)	629	0.50	New	0	±0
The Greens of Europe (LVE)	391	0.31	New	0	±0
Liberal Centrist Union (UCL)	315	0.25	–0.25	0	±0
Republican Left (IR)	201	0.16	+0.05	0	±0
Commoners' Land–Alternative for Castile and León (TC–ACAL)	171	0.13	–0.03	0	±0
Blank ballots	2,205	1.74	–0.35		
Total	126,889			7	±0
Valid votes	126,889	99.16	+0.19		
Invalid votes	1,071	0.84	–0.19		
Votes cast / turnout	127,960	71.05	–1.39		
Abstentions	52,130	28.95	+1.39		
Registered voters	180,090				
Sources
Footnotes: ^{1} United Zamora–Leonese People's Union results are compared to the combined totals of Leonese People's Union and United Zamora in the 2003 election.

=== 2003 ===
Summary of the 25 May 2003 Cortes of Castile and León election results in Zamora
Parties and alliances	Popular vote			Seats	
Parties and alliances	Votes	%	±pp	Total	+/−
People's Party (PP)	66,619	50.82	–2.23	4	–1
Spanish Socialist Workers' Party (PSOE)	47,822	36.48	+2.55	3	±0
Leonese People's Union (UPL)	3,942	3.01	New	0	±0
United Left of Castile and León (IUCyL)	3,324	2.54	–0.36	0	±0
United Zamora (ZU)	2,579	1.97	New	0	±0
Zamoran People's Union (UPZ)	1,998	1.52	+0.28	0	±0
Zamoran People for Zamora–PREPAL (PREPAL)	713	0.54	–0.58	0	±0
Liberal Centrist Union (UCL)	652	0.50	New	0	±0
Commoners' Land–Castilian Nationalist Party (TC–PNC)	210	0.16	±0.00	0	±0
The Phalanx (FE)	196	0.15	New	0	±0
Castilian Left (IzCa)	154	0.12	New	0	±0
Republican Left (IR)	140	0.11	New	0	±0
Blank ballots	2,744	2.09	–0.32		
Total	131,093			7	–1
Valid votes	131,093	98.97	+0.07		
Invalid votes	1,368	1.03	–0.07		
Votes cast / turnout	132,461	72.44	+3.80		
Abstentions	50,400	27.56	–3.80		
Registered voters	182,861				

=== 1999 ===
Summary of the 13 June 1999 Cortes of Castile and León election results in Zamora
Parties and alliances	Popular vote			Seats	
Parties and alliances	Votes	%	±pp	Total	+/−
People's Party (PP)	66,720	53.05	–2.66	5	±0
Spanish Socialist Workers' Party (PSOE)	42,677	33.93	+0.02	3	±0
Centrist Union–Democratic and Social Centre (UC–CDS)	5,302	4.22	New	0	±0
United Left of Castile and León (IUCyL)	3,650	2.90	–3.69	0	±0
Zamoran People's Union (UPZ)	1,556	1.24	New	0	±0
Salamanca–Zamora–León–PREPAL (PREPAL)	1,412	1.12	–0.54	0	±0
Confederation of the Greens (LV)	791	0.63	New	0	±0
Regionalist Unity of Castile and León (URCL)	310	0.25	New	0	±0
Commoners' Land–Castilian Nationalist Party (TC–PNC)	197	0.16	New	0	±0
Humanist Party (PH)	137	0.11	New	0	±0
Blank ballots	3,025	2.41	+0.54		
Total	125,777			8	±0
Valid votes	125,777	98.90	+0.08		
Invalid votes	1,400	1.10	–0.08		
Votes cast / turnout	127,177	68.64	–5.14		
Abstentions	58,093	31.36	+5.14		
Registered voters	185,270				

=== 1995 ===
Summary of the 28 May 1995 Cortes of Castile and León election results in Zamora
Parties and alliances	Popular vote			Seats	
Parties and alliances	Votes	%	±pp	Total	+/−
People's Party (PP)	73,088	55.71	+10.31	5	+1
Spanish Socialist Workers' Party (PSOE)	44,489	33.91	–3.69	3	±0
United Left of Castile and León (IU)	8,641	6.59	+3.18	0	±0
Zamoran People for Zamora–PREPAL (PREPAL)	2,182	1.66	+0.77	0	±0
Party of El Bierzo (PB)	331	0.25	New	0	±0
Democratic and Social Centre (CDS)	n/a	n/a	–9.90	0	–1
Blank ballots	2,454	1.87	+0.31		
Total	131,185			8	±0
Valid votes	131,185	98.82	–0.15		
Invalid votes	1,570	1.18	+0.15		
Votes cast / turnout	132,755	73.78	+3.82		
Abstentions	47,173	26.22	–3.82		
Registered voters	179,928				

=== 1991 ===
Summary of the 26 May 1991 Cortes of Castile and León election results in Zamora
Parties and alliances	Popular vote			Seats	
Parties and alliances	Votes	%	±pp	Total	+/−
People's Party (PP)^{1}	56,544	45.40	+0.44	4	±0
Spanish Socialist Workers' Party (PSOE)	46,827	37.60	+5.06	3	±0
Democratic and Social Centre (CDS)	12,335	9.90	–6.81	1	±0
United Left (IU)	4,243	3.41	+1.26	0	±0
The Greens (LV)	1,553	1.25	New	0	±0
Regionalist Party of the Leonese Country (PREPAL)	1,108	0.89	+0.12	0	±0
Blank ballots	1,938	1.56	+0.01		
Total	124,548			8	±0
Valid votes	124,548	98.97	+0.67		
Invalid votes	1,301	1.03	–0.67		
Votes cast / turnout	125,849	69.96	–3.53		
Abstentions	54,040	30.04	+3.53		
Registered voters	179,889				
Sources
Footnotes: ^{1} People's Party results are compared to the combined totals of People's Alliance and People's Democratic Party in the 1987 election.

=== 1987 ===
Summary of the 10 June 1987 Cortes of Castile and León election results in Zamora
Parties and alliances	Popular vote			Seats	
Parties and alliances	Votes	%	±pp	Total	+/−
People's Alliance (AP)^{1}	55,698	42.96	n/a	4	+1
Spanish Socialist Workers' Party (PSOE)	42,193	32.54	–8.53	3	–1
Democratic and Social Centre (CDS)	21,664	16.71	+9.33	1	+1
United Left (IU)^{2}	2,792	2.15	+0.54	0	±0
People's Democratic Party (PDP)^{1}	2,587	2.00	n/a	0	–1
Regionalist Party of the Leonese Country (PREPAL)	1,000	0.77	–1.50	0	±0
Leonesist Union (UNLE)	711	0.55	New	0	±0
Workers' Party of Spain–Communist Unity (PTE–UC)	555	0.43	New	0	±0
Nationalist Party of Castile and León (PNCL–PANCAL)^{1}	444	0.34	n/a	0	±0
Blank ballots	2,009	1.55	+0.64		
Total	129,653			8	±0
Valid votes	129,653	98.30	–0.14		
Invalid votes	2,245	1.70	+0.14		
Votes cast / turnout	131,898	73.49	+3.50		
Abstentions	47,579	26.51	–3.50		
Registered voters	179,477				
Sources
Footnotes: ^{1} Within the People's Coalition alliance in the 1983 election.; ^{2} United Left results are compared to Communist Party of Spain totals in the 1983 election.

=== 1983 ===
Summary of the 8 May 1983 Cortes of Castile and León election results in Zamora
Parties and alliances	Popular vote			Seats	
Parties and alliances	Votes	%	±pp	Total	+/−
Spanish Socialist Workers' Party (PSOE)	51,716	41.07	n/a	4	n/a
People's Coalition (AP–PDP–UL)	51,367	40.79	n/a	4	n/a
Democratic and Social Centre (CDS)	9,299	7.38	n/a	0	n/a
Liberal Democratic Party (PDL)	7,520	5.97	n/a	0	n/a
Agrarian Bloc–Regionalist Party of the Leonese Country (BAR–PREPAL)	2,863	2.27	n/a	0	n/a
Communist Party of Castile and León (PCCL–PCE)	2,027	1.61	n/a	0	n/a
Blank ballots	1,140	0.91	n/a		
Total	125,932			8	n/a
Valid votes	125,932	98.44	n/a		
Invalid votes	1,991	1.56	n/a		
Votes cast / turnout	127,923	69.99	n/a		
Abstentions	54,838	30.01	n/a		
Registered voters	182,761				
