= José Federico de Carvajal =

Spanish lawyer and politician

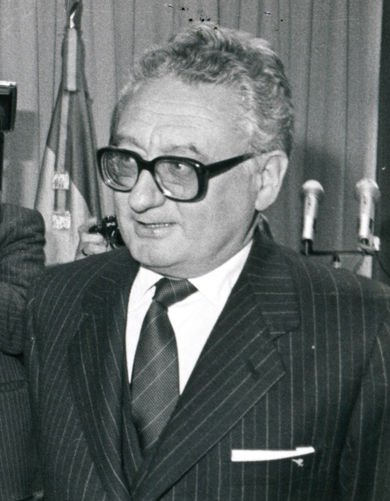

President of the Spanish Senate
- In office 18 November 1982 – 21 November 1989
- Preceded by: Cecilio Valverde Mazuelas
- Succeeded by: Juan José Laborda

Member of the Congress of Deputies
- In office 28 October 1989 – 6 June 1993
- Constituency: Madrid

Member of the Senate
- In office 28 October 1982 – 28 October 1989
- Constituency: Madrid
- In office 15 June 1977 – 2 January 1979
- Constituency: Ávila

Personal details
- Born: José Federico de Carvajal Pérez; 14 March 1930 Málaga, Spain
- Died: 13 June 2015 (aged 85)
- Party: Spanish Socialist Workers' Party

José Federico de Carvajal Pérez (14 March 1930 – 13 June 2015) was a Spanish lawyer and politician, member of the Spanish Socialist Workers' Party and President of the Spanish Senate from 1982 to 1989.
