= Juan José Laborda =

Spanish politician, President of the Senate (1989-1996)

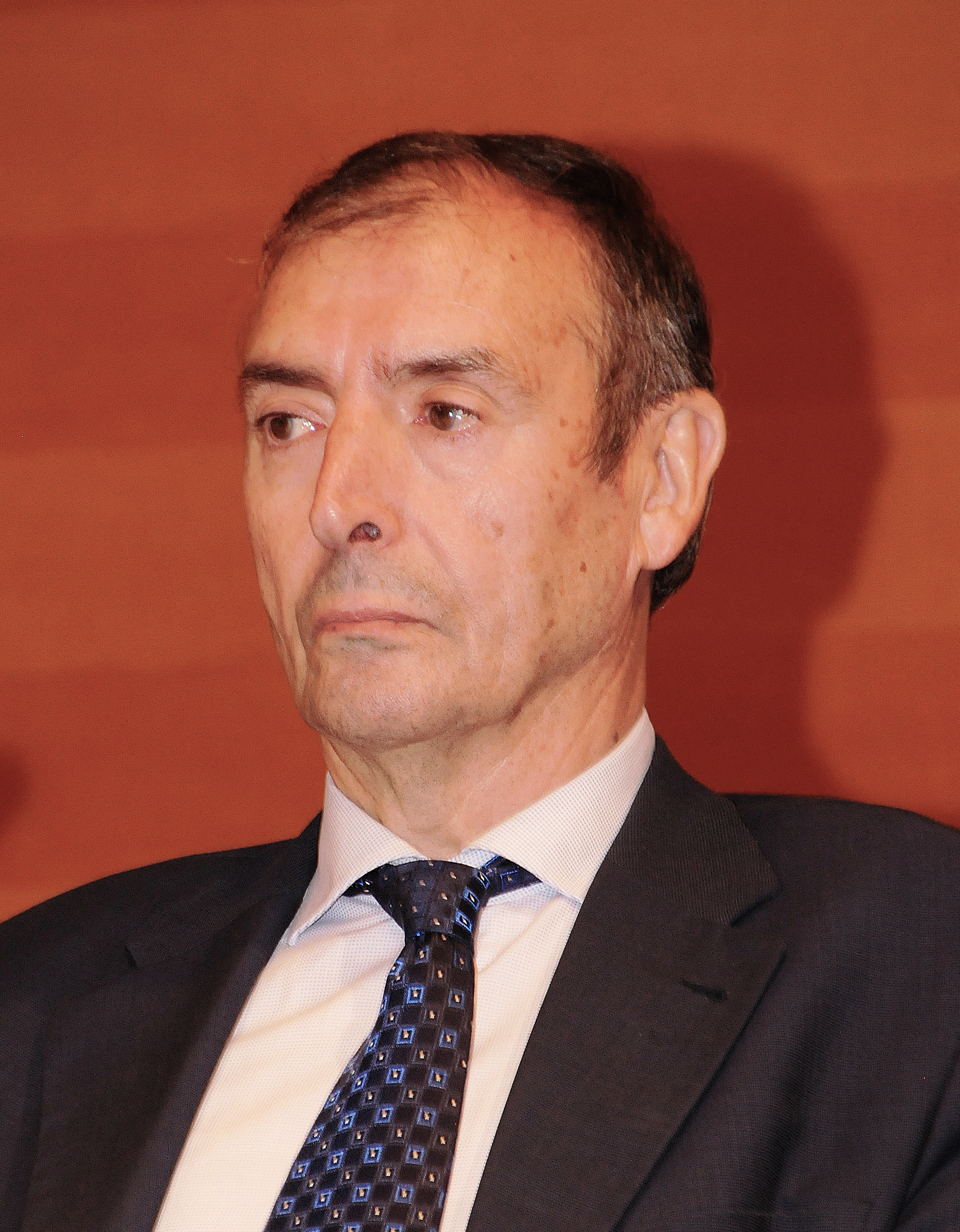
- Laborda in 2014

54th President of the Senate
- In office 21 November 1989 – 9 January 1996
- Prime Minister: Felipe González
- Preceded by: José Federico de Carvajal
- Succeeded by: Juan Ignacio Barrero

Spokesperson of the Socialist Workers' Party in the Senate
- In office 27 March 1996 – 2 April 2004
- In office 27 March 1979 – 15 September 1987
- Preceded by: Francisco Ramos Molins
- Succeeded by: Jaime Barreiro

Secretary-General of the Spanish Socialist Workers' Party of the Community of Castile and León
- In office 9 March 1985 – 26 May 1990
- Preceded by: Demetrio Madrid
- Succeeded by: Jesús Quijano

Senator of Spain
- In office 15 June 1977 – 2 April 2004
- Constituency: Burgos

Personal details
- Born: 4 October 1947 (age 78) Bilbao, Spain
- Party: PSOE
- Spouse: Ana Martinez (until 2020)
- Awards: Cross of Military Merit (1988); Order of Charles III (1996)

Juan José Laborda Martín (Spanish pronunciation: [xwaŋ xoˈse laˈβoɾða maɾˈtin]; born 4 October 1947) is a Spanish politician, historian, journalist and university professor, who served as President of the Senate from 1989 to 1996. He also served as Secretary-General of the Spanish Socialist Workers' Party of the Community of Castilla-León from 1985 to 1990, and a member of the Senate from 1977 to 2004.

Since 2015, he is the current director of the Chair of Parliamentary Monarchy at the University of Burgos.

== Career ==
A member of the Spanish Socialist Workers' Party, he was elected Senator for the province of Burgos in every legislature from 1977 to 2004. He was spokesperson for the Spanish Socialist Workers' Party in the Senate from 1979 to 1987 and again from 1996 to 2004, being the parliamentarian who has held the position of spokesperson for the longest period of time. He announced his retirement from active politics on 21 November 2007, the day he presented the reform of the Statute of Autonomy of Castile and León for debate. It was also he who, in 1978, formed part of the drafting commission of the pre-autonomy decree for Castile and León approved in 1982.

== Personal life ==
Laborda has three children. He was married to Ana Martinez until her death in 2020.
