= José Constantino Nalda =

Spanish politician

President of the Junta of Castile and León
- In office 18 November 1986 – 27 July 1987
- Preceded by: Demetrio Madrid
- Succeeded by: José María Aznar

Personal details
- Born: José Constantino Nalda García; August 5, 1939 Valladolid, Castile and León, Spain
- Party: PSOE

José Constantino Nalda García (born 5 August 1939) is a Spanish politician and member of the Spanish Socialist Workers' Party (PSOE) who served as President of the Junta of Castile and León from November 1986 to July 1987.
