= President of the Regional Government of Castile and León =

President of Castile and León
- Flag of Castile and León

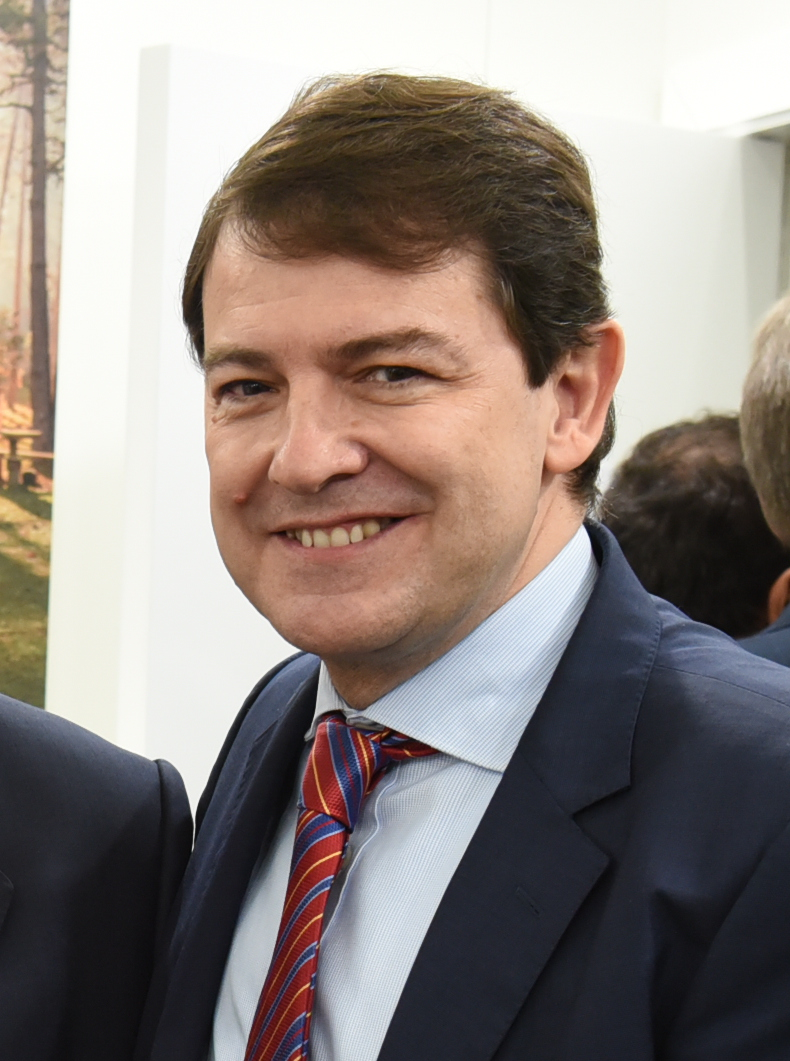
- Incumbent; Alfonso Fernández Mañueco since July 11, 2019
- Residence: Colegio de la Asunción
- Nominator: Cortes of Castile and León
- Appointer: The Monarch countersigned by the Prime Minister
- Term length: 4 years, renewable once
- Inaugural holder: Demetrio Madrid
- Formation: 1983

The president of the Regional Government of Castile and León (Spanish: Presidente de la Junta de Castilla y León) is the executive head of government of the Spanish autonomous community of Castile and León. The president is the head of the Junta of Castile and León, or regional government.

The current president of Castile and León is Alfonso Fernández Mañueco of the PP, who has held the office since July 11, 2019.

== List of presidents of Castile and León ==
#	Name	Portrait	Parliamentary term	Appointment Date	Cessation Date	Party
1	Demetrio Madrid		I	25 May 1983	18 November 1986	PSOE
2	Constantino Nalda		I	18 November 1986	27 July 1987	PSOE
3	José María Aznar		II	27 July 1987	16 September 1989	AP
3	José María Aznar		II	27 July 1987	16 September 1989	PP
4	Jesús Posada		II	16 September 1989	5 July 1991	PP
5	Juan José Lucas		III	5 July 1991	27 February 2001	PP
5	Juan José Lucas		IV	5 July 1991	27 February 2001	PP
5	Juan José Lucas		V	5 July 1991	27 February 2001	PP
6	Juan Vicente Herrera		V	16 March 2001	11 July 2019	PP
6	Juan Vicente Herrera		VI	16 March 2001	11 July 2019	PP
6	Juan Vicente Herrera		VII	16 March 2001	11 July 2019	PP
6	Juan Vicente Herrera		VIII	16 March 2001	11 July 2019	PP
7	Alfonso Fernández Mañueco		IX	11 July 2019	Incumbent	PP
7	Alfonso Fernández Mañueco		X	11 July 2019	Incumbent	PP
