= Cecilio Valverde Mazuelas =

Spanish politician and lawyer

Cecilio Valverde Mazuelas (27 June 1927 - 11 June 2001) was a Spanish politician and lawyer who was president of the Senate from 1979 to 1982.

== Biography ==
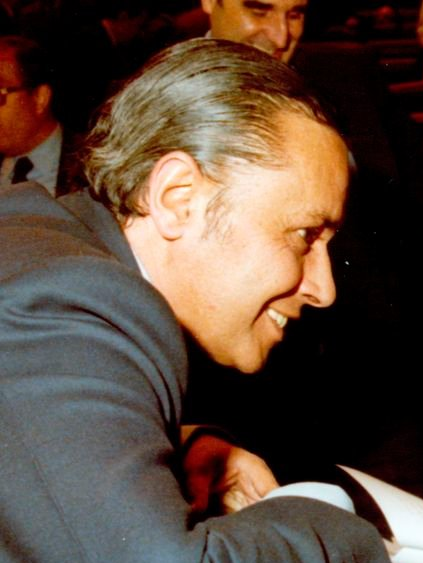
(Cecilio Valverde) 1979 (cropped)

He was born in Córdoba. He studied high school at Colegio de La Salle in his hometown. He obtained his degree in Law in 1948 after passing through the Central University of Madrid. Later he worked as a lawyer in different law firms in Córdoba, Seville, Granada and Madrid.

In 1961, he moved to the Archdiocese of Antioquia (Colombia) to implement the Cursillos de Cristiandad movement in Cordoba.

Secretary of the Bar Association of Cordoba (1962-1966), he was also a member of the board of directors of the Caja Provincial de Ahorros de Córdoba.

He served as President of the Senate from March 27, 1979 to August 31, 1982.

On May 1, 1980, while he was President of the Senate and Senator for the province of Córdoba, a false bomb was placed on the door of his home in Córdoba, which was attributed to the Armed Groups 28 de Febrero (GAVF).

He died in June 2001 at his residence in Madrid. He was married and had nine children.
