= Demetrio Madrid =

Spanish politician

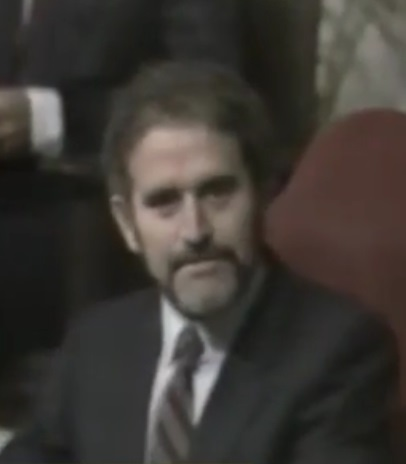

President of the Junta of Castile and León
- In office 25 May 1983 – 18 November 1986
- Preceded by: José Manuel García-Verdugo
- Succeeded by: José Constantino Nalda

Personal details
- Born: Demetrio Madrid López; 1 August 1936 Villaralbo, Castile and León, Spain
- Party: PSOE

Demetrio Madrid López (born 1 August 1936) is a Spanish politician and member of the Spanish Socialist Workers' Party (PSOE) who served as President of the Junta of Castile and León from May 1983 to November 1986.
