= Liberal Union (Spain, 1983) =

Liberal Union Unión Liberal
- Leader: Pedro Schwartz
- Founded: 18 January 1983
- Dissolved: 22 December 1984
- Ideology: Liberalism

The Liberal Union (Spanish: Unión Liberal; UL) was a small Spanish liberal party founded by Pedro Schwartz in 1983 and officially launched on 23 March that year.

== History ==
In the 1982 general election, Pedro Schwartz ran as an independent in the lists of the coalition formed by People's Alliance and the People's Democratic Party (AP-PDP), winning a seat for Madrid. He convinced the coalition leader, Manuel Fraga, of the need to create a liberal party with which would challenge for the votes of the political center. Fraga acceded and Schwartz created the Liberal Union party that joined the coalition between AP and PDP (as a result, the coalition was renamed AP-PDP-UL). The party was registered in the Register of the Ministry of Interior on 18 January 1983.

On 26 January 1984, in an attempt to "renew" the party, Pedro Schwartz was replaced as party president by Antonio Fontán. On 22 November 1984 the Liberal Union appointed Rafael Márquezas president of the party, replacing Antonio Fontán.

On 22 December 1984 the Liberal Union agreed to merge with another liberal party that had approached the orbit of the coalition, with the party taking the name of the second: Liberal Party, so that the center-right coalition was renamed AP-PDP-PL (at the time of the 1986 general election it would be named People's Coalition). The merge of both parties was completed in 1985.

Among the Liberal Union members was Esperanza Aguirre.
