= Albacete (Cortes of Castilla–La Mancha constituency) =

Coordinates: 38°50′N 2°00′W

- Cortes of Castilla–La Mancha; Electoral constituency
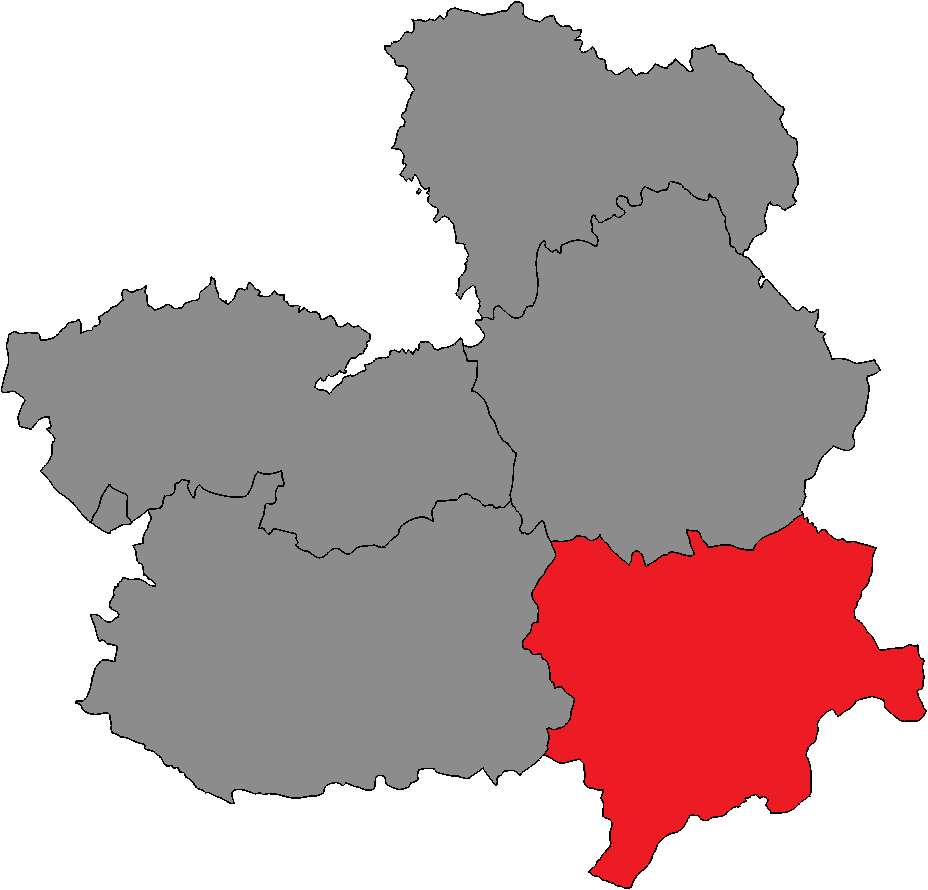
- Location of Albacete within Castilla–La Mancha
- Province: Albacete
- Autonomous community: Castilla–La Mancha
- Population: ▲388,599 (2024)
- Electorate: ▼308,216 (2023)
- Major settlements: Albacete

Current constituency
- Created: 1983
- Seats: 9 (1983–1986); 10 (1986–2014); 6 (2014–2019); 7 (2019–present)
- Members: PSOE (3); PP (3); Vox (1)

Albacete is one of the five constituencies (Spanish: circunscripciones) represented in the Cortes of Castilla–La Mancha, the regional legislature of the autonomous community of Castilla–La Mancha. The constituency currently elects six deputies. Its boundaries correspond to those of the Spanish province of Albacete. The electoral system uses the D'Hondt method and closed-list proportional representation, with a minimum threshold of three percent.

== Electoral system ==
The constituency was created as per the Statute of Autonomy of Castilla–La Mancha of 1982 and was first contested in the 1983 regional election. The Statute provided for the five provinces in Castilla–La Mancha—Albacete, Ciudad Real, Cuenca, Guadalajara and Toledo—to be established as multi-member districts in the Cortes of Castilla–La Mancha, with this regulation being maintained under the 1986 regional electoral law. Each constituency is entitled to an initial minimum of three seats, with the remaining 18—22 from 1986 to 1998—being distributed in proportion to their populations. In 1983 and from 1998 to 2014, each constituency was allocated a fixed number of seats: 9 for Albacete (10 from 1998 to 2014), 10 for Ciudad Real (11 from 1998 to 2012; 12 until 2014), 8 for Cuenca (8 from 2012 to 2014), 7 for Guadalajara (8 from 2007 to 2012; 9 until 2014) and 10 for Toledo (11 from 1998 to 2007; 12 from 2007 to 2012; 13 until 2014).

Voting is on the basis of universal suffrage, which comprises all nationals over eighteen, registered in Castilla–La Mancha and in full enjoyment of their political rights. Amendments to the electoral law in 2011 required for Castilian-Manchegan people abroad to apply for voting before being permitted to vote, a system known as "begged" or expat vote (Spanish: Voto rogado) which was abolished in 2022. Seats are elected using the D'Hondt method and a closed list proportional representation, with an electoral threshold of three percent of valid votes—which includes blank ballots—being applied in each constituency. The only exception was in 1983, when a five percent threshold was applied regionally. The use of the D'Hondt method might result in a higher effective threshold, depending on the district magnitude.

The electoral law allows for parties and federations registered in the interior ministry, coalitions and groupings of electors to present lists of candidates. Parties and federations intending to form a coalition ahead of an election are required to inform the relevant Electoral Commission within ten days of the election call—fifteen before 1985—whereas groupings of electors need to secure the signature of at least one percent of the electorate in the constituencies for which they seek election—one-thousandth of the electorate, with a compulsory minimum of 500 signatures, until 1985—disallowing electors from signing for more than one list of candidates.

== Deputies ==
Deputies 1983–present
Key to parties IU PSOE CDS Cs PP CP AP Vox
| Cortes | Election | Distribution |
| 1st | 1983 | 5 / 4 |
| 2nd | 1987 | 6 / 1 / 3 |
| 3rd | 1991 | 1 / 6 / 3 |
| 4th | 1995 | 1 / 5 / 4 |
| 5th | 1999 | 6 / 4 |
| 6th | 2003 | 6 / 4 |
| 7th | 2007 | 6 / 4 |
| 8th | 2011 | 5 / 5 |
| 9th | 2015 | 3 / 3 |
| 10th | 2019 | 4 / 1 / 2 |
| 11th | 2023 | 3 / 3 / 1 |

== Regional elections ==
=== 2023 ===
Summary of the 28 May 2023 Cortes of Castilla–La Mancha election results in Albacete
| Parties and alliances | Popular vote | | | Seats | |
| Parties and alliances | Votes | % | ±pp | Total | +/− |
|---|---|---|---|---|---|
| Spanish Socialist Workers' Party (PSOE) | 89,054 | 42.62 | +0.70 | 3 | –1 |
| People's Party (PP) | 74,179 | 35.50 | +6.44 | 3 | +1 |
| Vox (Vox) | 25,915 | 12.40 | +6.72 | 1 | +1 |
| United We Can Castilla–La Mancha (Unidas Podemos CLM) | 9,721 | 4.65 | –3.29 | 0 | ±0 |
| Citizens–Party of the Citizenry (CS) | 3,371 | 1.61 | –11.55 | 0 | –1 |
| Animalist Party with the Environment (PACMA)^{1} | 2,470 | 1.18 | +0.32 | 0 | ±0 |
| Country with Managers (País con Gestores) | 718 | 0.34 | New | 0 | ±0 |
| Blank ballots | 3,514 | 1.68 | +0.86 | | |
| Total | 208,942 | | | 7 | ±0 |
| Valid votes | 208,942 | 98.20 | –0.79 | | |
| Invalid votes | 3,826 | 1.80 | +0.79 | | |
| Votes cast / turnout | 212,768 | 69.03 | +1.70 | | |
| Abstentions | 95,448 | 30.97 | –1.70 | | |
| Registered voters | 308,216 | | | | |
Sources
Footnotes: ^{1} Animalist Party with the Environment results are compared to Animalist Party Against Mistreatment of Animals totals in the 2019 election.

=== 2019 ===
Summary of the 26 May 2019 Cortes of Castilla–La Mancha election results in Albacete
| Parties and alliances | Popular vote | | | Seats | |
| Parties and alliances | Votes | % | ±pp | Total | +/− |
|---|---|---|---|---|---|
| Spanish Socialist Workers' Party (PSOE) | 86,626 | 41.92 | +8.07 | 4 | +1 |
| People's Party (PP) | 60,059 | 29.06 | –7.60 | 2 | –1 |
| Citizens–Party of the Citizenry (Cs) | 27,191 | 13.16 | +3.53 | 1 | +1 |
| United We Can–United Left–Equo CLM (Podemos–IU–Equo)^{1} | 16,398 | 7.94 | –7.10 | 0 | ±0 |
| Vox (Vox) | 11,744 | 5.68 | +5.31 | 0 | ±0 |
| Animalist Party Against Mistreatment of Animals (PACMA) | 1,769 | 0.86 | –0.04 | 0 | ±0 |
| Communist Party of the Peoples of Spain (PCPE) | 538 | 0.26 | +0.02 | 0 | ±0 |
| For a Fairer World (PUM+J) | 260 | 0.13 | New | 0 | ±0 |
| Traditions and Rural World (ANATUR–UDEC) | 204 | 0.10 | New | 0 | ±0 |
| Together We Win (JG) | 149 | 0.07 | New | 0 | ±0 |
| Blank ballots | 1,704 | 0.82 | –0.92 | | |
| Total | 206,642 | | | 7 | +1 |
| Valid votes | 206,642 | 98.99 | +0.96 | | |
| Invalid votes | 2,113 | 1.01 | –0.96 | | |
| Votes cast / turnout | 208,755 | 67.33 | –3.43 | | |
| Abstentions | 101,304 | 32.67 | +3.43 | | |
| Registered voters | 310,059 | | | | |
Sources
Footnotes: ^{1} United We Can–United Left–Equo CLM results are compared to the combined totals of We Can and Let's Win Castilla–La Mancha–The Greens–United Left in the 2015 election.

=== 2015 ===
Summary of the 24 May 2015 Cortes of Castilla–La Mancha election results in Albacete
| Parties and alliances | Popular vote | | | Seats | |
| Parties and alliances | Votes | % | ±pp | Total | +/− |
|---|---|---|---|---|---|
| People's Party (PP) | 79,082 | 36.66 | –11.73 | 3 | –2 |
| Spanish Socialist Workers' Party (PSOE) | 73,004 | 33.85 | –7.81 | 3 | –2 |
| We Can (Podemos) | 24,235 | 11.24 | New | 0 | ±0 |
| Citizens–Party of the Citizenry (C's) | 20,775 | 9.63 | New | 0 | ±0 |
| Let's Win Castilla–La Mancha–The Greens–United Left (Ganemos–LV–IU)^{1} | 8,193 | 3.80 | –0.92 | 0 | ±0 |
| Union, Progress and Democracy (UPyD) | 2,085 | 0.97 | –0.97 | 0 | ±0 |
| Animalist Party Against Mistreatment of Animals (PACMA) | 1,933 | 0.90 | +0.44 | 0 | ±0 |
| Union of Independent Citizens (UCIN) | 1,076 | 0.50 | New | 0 | ±0 |
| Vox (Vox) | 802 | 0.37 | New | 0 | ±0 |
| Communist Party of the Peoples of Spain (PCPE) | 511 | 0.24 | New | 0 | ±0 |
| Castilian Party–Castilian Unity (PCAS–UdCa)^{2} | 244 | 0.11 | –0.08 | 0 | ±0 |
| Blank ballots | 3,758 | 1.74 | –0.19 | | |
| Total | 215,698 | | | 6 | –4 |
| Valid votes | 215,698 | 98.03 | –0.60 | | |
| Invalid votes | 4,336 | 1.97 | +0.60 | | |
| Votes cast / turnout | 220,034 | 70.76 | –3.99 | | |
| Abstentions | 90,917 | 29.24 | +3.99 | | |
| Registered voters | 310,951 | | | | |
Sources
Footnotes: ^{1} Let's Win Castilla–La Mancha–The Greens–United Left results are compared to United Left of Castilla–La Mancha totals in the 2011 election.; ^{2} Castilian Party–Castilian Unity results are compared to Castilian Party totals in the 2011 election.

=== 2011 ===
Summary of the 22 May 2011 Cortes of Castilla–La Mancha election results in Albacete
| Parties and alliances | Popular vote | | | Seats | |
| Parties and alliances | Votes | % | ±pp | Total | +/− |
|---|---|---|---|---|---|
| People's Party (PP) | 110,255 | 48.39 | +7.64 | 5 | +1 |
| Spanish Socialist Workers' Party (PSOE) | 94,910 | 41.66 | –10.99 | 5 | –1 |
| United Left of Castilla–La Mancha (IUCLM) | 10,751 | 4.72 | +0.81 | 0 | ±0 |
| Union, Progress and Democracy (UPyD) | 4,412 | 1.94 | New | 0 | ±0 |
| Citizens for Blank Votes (CenB) | 1,615 | 0.71 | New | 0 | ±0 |
| Anti-Bullfighting Party Against Mistreatment of Animals (PACMA) | 1,048 | 0.46 | New | 0 | ±0 |
| Castilian Party (PCAS)^{1} | 442 | 0.19 | +0.07 | 0 | ±0 |
| Blank ballots | 4,408 | 1.93 | +0.47 | | |
| Total | 227,841 | | | 10 | ±0 |
| Valid votes | 227,841 | 98.63 | –0.64 | | |
| Invalid votes | 3,163 | 1.37 | +0.64 | | |
| Votes cast / turnout | 231,004 | 74.75 | +3.05 | | |
| Abstentions | 78,025 | 25.25 | –3.05 | | |
| Registered voters | 309,029 | | | | |
Sources
Footnotes: ^{1} Castilian Party results are compared to Commoners' Land totals in the 2007 election.

=== 2007 ===
Summary of the 27 May 2007 Cortes of Castilla–La Mancha election results in Albacete
| Parties and alliances | Popular vote | | | Seats | |
| Parties and alliances | Votes | % | ±pp | Total | +/− |
|---|---|---|---|---|---|
| Spanish Socialist Workers' Party (PSOE) | 113,295 | 52.65 | –5.38 | 6 | ±0 |
| People's Party (PP) | 87,684 | 40.75 | +4.39 | 4 | ±0 |
| United Left–Left of Castilla–La Mancha (IU–ICAM) | 8,416 | 3.91 | +0.43 | 0 | ±0 |
| The Greens of Europe (LVE) | 1,697 | 0.79 | New | 0 | ±0 |
| Republican Left (IR) | 410 | 0.19 | New | 0 | ±0 |
| Humanist Party (PH) | 286 | 0.13 | –0.09 | 0 | ±0 |
| Commoners' Land (TC) | 259 | 0.12 | –0.06 | 0 | ±0 |
| Blank ballots | 3,140 | 1.46 | –0.09 | | |
| Total | 215,187 | | | 10 | ±0 |
| Valid votes | 215,187 | 99.27 | –0.11 | | |
| Invalid votes | 1,579 | 0.73 | +0.11 | | |
| Votes cast / turnout | 216,766 | 71.70 | –2.36 | | |
| Abstentions | 85,555 | 28.30 | +2.36 | | |
| Registered voters | 302,321 | | | | |

=== 2003 ===
Summary of the 25 May 2003 Cortes of Castilla–La Mancha election results in Albacete
| Parties and alliances | Popular vote | | | Seats | |
| Parties and alliances | Votes | % | ±pp | Total | +/− |
|---|---|---|---|---|---|
| Spanish Socialist Workers' Party (PSOE) | 127,148 | 58.03 | +2.19 | 6 | ±0 |
| People's Party (PP) | 79,672 | 36.36 | –0.72 | 4 | ±0 |
| United Left–Left of Castilla–La Mancha (IU–ICAM) | 7,635 | 3.48 | –0.69 | 0 | ±0 |
| Humanist Party (PH) | 492 | 0.22 | +0.09 | 0 | ±0 |
| Commoners' Land–Castilian Nationalist Party (TC–PNC) | 389 | 0.18 | +0.10 | 0 | ±0 |
| National Democracy (DN) | 360 | 0.16 | New | 0 | ±0 |
| Blank ballots | 3,399 | 1.55 | –0.21 | | |
| Total | 219,095 | | | 10 | ±0 |
| Valid votes | 219,095 | 99.38 | ±0.00 | | |
| Invalid votes | 1,375 | 0.62 | ±0.00 | | |
| Votes cast / turnout | 220,470 | 74.06 | +1.91 | | |
| Abstentions | 77,211 | 25.94 | –1.91 | | |
| Registered voters | 297,681 | | | | |

=== 1999 ===
Summary of the 13 June 1999 Cortes of Castilla–La Mancha election results in Albacete
| Parties and alliances | Popular vote | | | Seats | |
| Parties and alliances | Votes | % | ±pp | Total | +/− |
|---|---|---|---|---|---|
| Spanish Socialist Workers' Party–Progressives (PSOE–p) | 117,615 | 55.84 | +11.38 | 6 | +1 |
| People's Party (PP) | 78,097 | 37.08 | –6.13 | 4 | ±0 |
| United Left–Left of Castilla–La Mancha (IU–ICAM) | 8,785 | 4.17 | –6.18 | 0 | –1 |
| Manchegan Regionalist Party (PRM) | 993 | 0.47 | New | 0 | ±0 |
| Spanish Phalanx of the CNSO (FE–JONS) | 361 | 0.17 | New | 0 | ±0 |
| Centrist Union–Democratic and Social Centre (UC–CDS) | 341 | 0.16 | –0.18 | 0 | ±0 |
| Regionalist Party of Castilla–La Mancha (PRCM) | 305 | 0.14 | –0.20 | 0 | ±0 |
| Humanist Party (PH) | 277 | 0.13 | New | 0 | ±0 |
| Commoners' Land–Castilian Nationalist Party (TC–PNC) | 161 | 0.08 | –0.03 | 0 | ±0 |
| Blank ballots | 3,697 | 1.76 | +0.63 | | |
| Total | 210,632 | | | 10 | ±0 |
| Valid votes | 210,632 | 99.38 | +0.04 | | |
| Invalid votes | 1,316 | 0.62 | –0.04 | | |
| Votes cast / turnout | 211,948 | 72.15 | –5.89 | | |
| Abstentions | 81,827 | 27.85 | +5.89 | | |
| Registered voters | 293,775 | | | | |

=== 1995 ===
Summary of the 28 May 1995 Cortes of Castilla–La Mancha election results in Albacete
| Parties and alliances | Popular vote | | | Seats | |
| Parties and alliances | Votes | % | ±pp | Total | +/− |
|---|---|---|---|---|---|
| Spanish Socialist Workers' Party (PSOE) | 96,565 | 44.46 | –9.58 | 5 | –1 |
| People's Party (PP) | 93,843 | 43.21 | +11.69 | 4 | +1 |
| United Left–Left of Castilla–La Mancha (IU–ICAM) | 22,475 | 10.35 | +1.64 | 1 | ±0 |
| Regionalist Party of Castilla–La Mancha (PRCM) | 747 | 0.34 | New | 0 | ±0 |
| Centrist Union (UC) | 618 | 0.28 | –3.13 | 0 | ±0 |
| Commoners' Land–Castilian Nationalist Party (TC–PNC) | 245 | 0.11 | New | 0 | ±0 |
| Action for Talavera Region (ACTAL) | 237 | 0.11 | New | 0 | ±0 |
| Blank ballots | 2,464 | 1.13 | ±0.00 | | |
| Total | 217,194 | | | 10 | ±0 |
| Valid votes | 217,194 | 99.34 | +0.09 | | |
| Invalid votes | 1,449 | 0.66 | –0.09 | | |
| Votes cast / turnout | 218,643 | 78.04 | +7.64 | | |
| Abstentions | 61,522 | 21.96 | –7.64 | | |
| Registered voters | 280,165 | | | | |

=== 1991 ===
Summary of the 26 May 1991 Cortes of Castilla–La Mancha election results in Albacete
| Parties and alliances | Popular vote | | | Seats | |
| Parties and alliances | Votes | % | ±pp | Total | +/− |
|---|---|---|---|---|---|
| Spanish Socialist Workers' Party (PSOE) | 100,420 | 54.04 | +5.50 | 6 | ±0 |
| People's Party (PP)^{1} | 58,568 | 31.52 | –0.27 | 3 | ±0 |
| United Left (IU) | 16,194 | 8.71 | +2.16 | 1 | +1 |
| Democratic and Social Centre (CDS) | 6,342 | 3.41 | –7.35 | 0 | –1 |
| The Greens Ecologist–Humanist List (LVLE–H)^{2} | 1,824 | 0.98 | +0.77 | 0 | ±0 |
| Social Democratic Party of Castilla–La Mancha (PSDCLM) | 378 | 0.20 | New | 0 | ±0 |
| Blank ballots | 2,109 | 1.13 | +0.14 | | |
| Total | 185,835 | | | 10 | ±0 |
| Valid votes | 185,835 | 99.25 | +0.27 | | |
| Invalid votes | 1,410 | 0.75 | –0.27 | | |
| Votes cast / turnout | 187,245 | 70.40 | –2.79 | | |
| Abstentions | 78,732 | 29.60 | +2.79 | | |
| Registered voters | 265,977 | | | | |
Sources
Footnotes: ^{1} People's Party results are compared to the combined totals of People's Alliance and People's Democratic Party in the 1987 election.; ^{2} The Greens Ecologist–Humanist List results are compared to Humanist Platform totals in the 1987 election.

=== 1987 ===
Summary of the 10 June 1987 Cortes of Castilla–La Mancha election results in Albacete
| Parties and alliances | Popular vote | | | Seats | |
| Parties and alliances | Votes | % | ±pp | Total | +/− |
|---|---|---|---|---|---|
| Spanish Socialist Workers' Party (PSOE) | 87,833 | 48.54 | –4.30 | 6 | +1 |
| People's Alliance (AP)^{1} | 55,425 | 30.63 | –6.31 | 3 | –1 |
| Democratic and Social Centre (CDS) | 19,471 | 10.76 | +8.79 | 1 | +1 |
| United Left (IU)^{2} | 11,854 | 6.55 | –0.72 | 0 | ±0 |
| People's Democratic Party (PDP) | 2,090 | 1.16 | New | 0 | ±0 |
| Workers' Party of Spain–Communist Unity (PTE–UC) | 1,609 | 0.89 | New | 0 | ±0 |
| Manchegan Regionalist Party (PRM) | 487 | 0.27 | New | 0 | ±0 |
| Humanist Platform (PH) | 380 | 0.21 | New | 0 | ±0 |
| Blank ballots | 1,789 | 0.99 | +0.34 | | |
| Total | 180,938 | | | 10 | +1 |
| Valid votes | 180,938 | 98.98 | +0.15 | | |
| Invalid votes | 1,861 | 1.02 | –0.15 | | |
| Votes cast / turnout | 182,799 | 73.19 | +2.30 | | |
| Abstentions | 66,962 | 26.81 | –2.30 | | |
| Registered voters | 249,761 | | | | |
Sources
Footnotes: ^{1} People's Alliance results are compared to People's Coalition totals in the 1983 election.; ^{2} United Left results are compared to Communist Party of Spain totals in the 1983 election.

=== 1983 ===
Summary of the 8 May 1983 Cortes of Castilla–La Mancha election results in Albacete
| Parties and alliances | Popular vote | | | Seats | |
| Parties and alliances | Votes | % | ±pp | Total | +/− |
|---|---|---|---|---|---|
| Spanish Socialist Workers' Party (PSOE) | 91,876 | 52.84 | n/a | 5 | n/a |
| People's Coalition (AP–PDP–UL) | 64,235 | 36.94 | n/a | 4 | n/a |
| Communist Party of Spain (PCE) | 12,643 | 7.27 | n/a | 0 | n/a |
| Democratic and Social Centre (CDS) | 3,424 | 1.97 | n/a | 0 | n/a |
| Spanish Communist Workers' Party–Unified Communist Party (PCOE–PCEU) | 579 | 0.33 | n/a | 0 | n/a |
| Blank ballots | 1,125 | 0.65 | n/a | | |
| Total | 173,882 | | | 9 | n/a |
| Valid votes | 173,882 | 98.83 | n/a | | |
| Invalid votes | 2,064 | 1.17 | n/a | | |
| Votes cast / turnout | 175,946 | 70.89 | n/a | | |
| Abstentions | 72,256 | 29.11 | n/a | | |
| Registered voters | 248,202 | | | | |
