= Toledo (Cortes of Castilla–La Mancha constituency) =

Coordinates: 39°50′N 4°00′W

- Cortes of Castilla–La Mancha; Electoral constituency
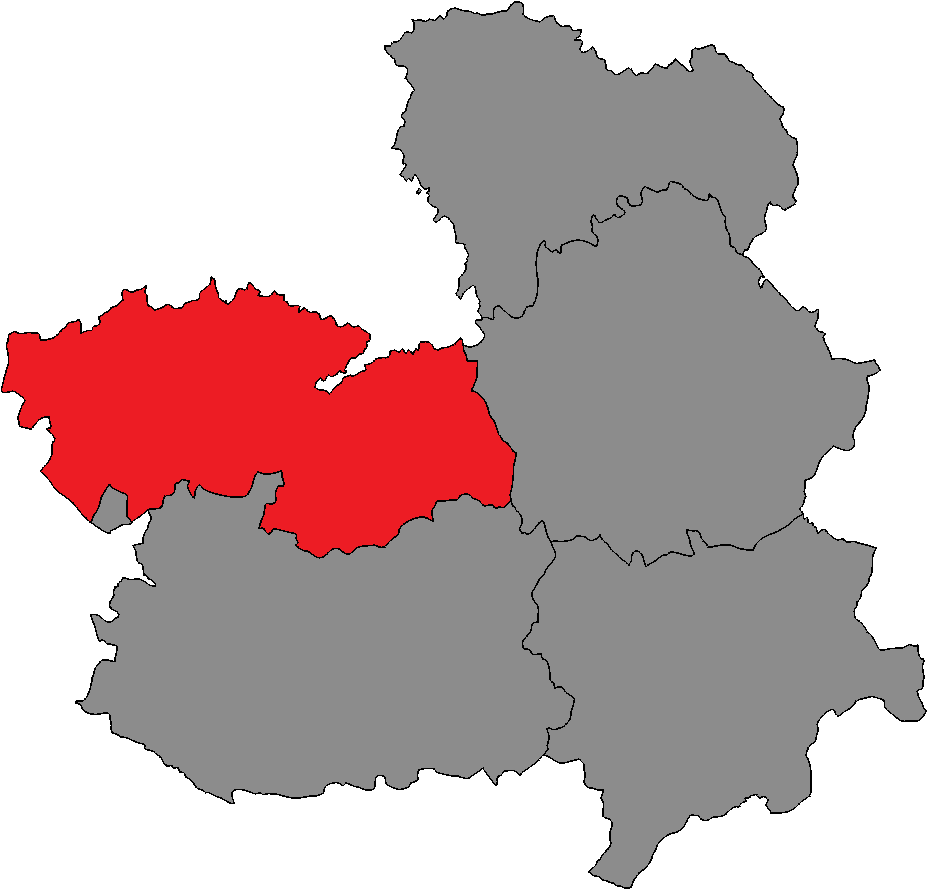
- Location of Toledo within Castilla–La Mancha
- Province: Toledo
- Autonomous community: Castilla–La Mancha
- Population: ▲740,148 (2024)
- Electorate: ▲541,628 (2023)
- Major settlements: Talavera de la Reina, Toledo

Current constituency
- Created: 1983
- Seats: 10 (1983–1986); 11 (1986–2007); 12 (2007–2012); 13 (2012–2014); 9 (2014–present)
- Members: PSOE (5); PP (3); Vox (1)

Toledo is one of the five constituencies (Spanish: circunscripciones) represented in the Cortes of Castilla–La Mancha, the regional legislature of the autonomous community of Castilla–La Mancha. The constituency currently elects nine deputies. Its boundaries correspond to those of the Spanish province of Toledo. The electoral system uses the D'Hondt method and closed-list proportional representation, with a minimum threshold of three percent.

== Electoral system ==
The constituency was created as per the Statute of Autonomy of Castilla–La Mancha of 1982 and was first contested in the 1983 regional election. The Statute provided for the five provinces in Castilla–La Mancha—Albacete, Ciudad Real, Cuenca, Guadalajara and Toledo—to be established as multi-member districts in the Cortes of Castilla–La Mancha, with this regulation being maintained under the 1986 regional electoral law. Each constituency is entitled to an initial minimum of three seats, with the remaining 18—22 from 1986 to 1998—being distributed in proportion to their populations. In 1983 and from 1998 to 2014, each constituency was allocated a fixed number of seats: 9 for Albacete (10 from 1998 to 2014), 10 for Ciudad Real (11 from 1998 to 2012; 12 until 2014), 8 for Cuenca (8 from 2012 to 2014), 7 for Guadalajara (8 from 2007 to 2012; 9 until 2014) and 10 for Toledo (11 from 1998 to 2007; 12 from 2007 to 2012; 13 until 2014).

Voting is on the basis of universal suffrage, which comprises all nationals over eighteen, registered in Castilla–La Mancha and in full enjoyment of their political rights. Amendments to the electoral law in 2011 required for Castilian-Manchegan people abroad to apply for voting before being permitted to vote, a system known as "begged" or expat vote (Spanish: Voto rogado) which was abolished in 2022. Seats are elected using the D'Hondt method and a closed list proportional representation, with an electoral threshold of three percent of valid votes—which includes blank ballots—being applied in each constituency. The only exception was in 1983, when a five percent threshold was applied regionally. The use of the D'Hondt method might result in a higher effective threshold, depending on the district magnitude.

The electoral law allows for parties and federations registered in the interior ministry, coalitions and groupings of electors to present lists of candidates. Parties and federations intending to form a coalition ahead of an election are required to inform the relevant Electoral Commission within ten days of the election call—fifteen before 1985—whereas groupings of electors need to secure the signature of at least one percent of the electorate in the constituencies for which they seek election—one-thousandth of the electorate, with a compulsory minimum of 500 signatures, until 1985—disallowing electors from signing for more than one list of candidates.

== Deputies ==
Deputies 1983–present
Key to parties Podemos PSOE CDS Cs PP CP AP Vox
Cortes	Election	Distribution
1st	1983	5 / 5
2nd	1987	6 / 1 / 4
3rd	1991	6 / 5
4th	1995	6 / 5
5th	1999	6 / 5
6th	2003	7 / 4
7th	2007	6 / 5
8th	2011	6 / 6
9th	2015	1 / 4 / 4
10th	2019	5 / 1 / 3
11th	2023	5 / 3 / 1

== Regional elections ==
=== 2023 ===
Summary of the 28 May 2023 Cortes of Castilla–La Mancha election results in Toledo
Parties and alliances	Popular vote			Seats	
Parties and alliances	Votes	%	±pp	Total	+/−
Spanish Socialist Workers' Party (PSOE)	167,292	45.58	+1.01	5	±0
People's Party (PP)	121,848	33.20	+4.92	3	±0
Vox (Vox)	48,622	13.25	+5.12	1	+1
United We Can Castilla–La Mancha (Unidas Podemos CLM)	14,466	3.94	–2.59	0	±0
Animalist Party with the Environment (PACMA)^{1}	2,976	0.81	+0.04	0	±0
Citizens–Party of the Citizenry (CS)	2,662	0.73	–9.79	0	–1
Empty Spain (España Vaciada)	1,670	0.45	New	0	±0
Communist Party of the Peoples of Spain (PCPE)	989	0.27	+0.12	0	±0
Country with Managers (País con Gestores)	865	0.24	New	0	±0
Here Now (Aquí Ahora)	724	0.20	New	0	±0
Castilian Party–Commoners' Land–Zero Cuts (PCAS–TC–RC)	509	0.14	–0.06	0	±0
Blank ballots	4,444	1.21	+0.46		
Total	367,067			9	±0
Valid votes	367,067	98.25	–0.68		
Invalid votes	6,553	1.75	+0.68		
Votes cast / turnout	373,620	68.98	–0.98		
Abstentions	168,008	31.02	+0.98		
Registered voters	541,628				
Sources
Footnotes: ^{1} Animalist Party with the Environment results are compared to Animalist Party Against Mistreatment of Animals totals in the 2019 election.

=== 2019 ===
Summary of the 26 May 2019 Cortes of Castilla–La Mancha election results in Toledo
Parties and alliances	Popular vote			Seats	
Parties and alliances	Votes	%	±pp	Total	+/−
Spanish Socialist Workers' Party (PSOE)	161,723	44.57	+7.63	5	+1
People's Party (PP)	102,626	28.28	–9.97	3	–1
Citizens–Party of the Citizenry (Cs)	38,174	10.52	+2.08	1	+1
Vox (Vox)	29,492	8.13	+7.62	0	±0
United We Can–United Left–Equo CLM (Podemos–IU–Equo)^{1}	23,700	6.53	–5.23	0	–1
Animalist Party Against Mistreatment of Animals (PACMA)	2,796	0.77	–0.09	0	±0
Communist Party of the Peoples of Spain (PCPE)	710	0.20	+0.07	0	±0
Castilian Party–Commoners' Land (PCAS–TC)	551	0.15	+0.05	0	±0
Traditions and Rural World (ANATUR–UDEC)	351	0.10	New	0	±0
Blank ballots	2,720	0.75	–0.74		
Total	362,843			9	±0
Valid votes	362,843	98.93	+1.24		
Invalid votes	3,922	1.07	–1.24		
Votes cast / turnout	366,765	69.96	–2.00		
Abstentions	157,517	30.04	+2.00		
Registered voters	524,282				
Sources
Footnotes: ^{1} United We Can–United Left–Equo CLM results are compared to the combined totals of We Can and Let's Win Castilla–La Mancha–The Greens–United Left in the 2015 election.

=== 2015 ===
Summary of the 24 May 2015 Cortes of Castilla–La Mancha election results in Toledo
Parties and alliances	Popular vote			Seats	
Parties and alliances	Votes	%	±pp	Total	+/−
People's Party (PP)	139,622	38.25	–10.86	4	–2
Spanish Socialist Workers' Party (PSOE)	134,851	36.94	–5.94	4	–2
We Can (Podemos)	32,068	8.79	New	1	+1
Citizens–Party of the Citizenry (C's)	30,794	8.44	New	0	±0
Let's Win Castilla–La Mancha–The Greens–United Left (Ganemos–LV–IU)^{1}	10,828	2.97	–0.66	0	±0
Animalist Party Against Mistreatment of Animals (PACMA)	3,137	0.86	+0.57	0	±0
Union, Progress and Democracy (UPyD)	2,896	0.79	–0.70	0	±0
Vox (Vox)	1,869	0.51	New	0	±0
The Greens–Green Group (LV–GV)	1,479	0.41	–0.20	0	±0
Union of Independent Citizens (UCIN)^{2}	1,176	0.32	–0.05	0	±0
Communist Party of the Peoples of Spain (PCPE)	476	0.13	New	0	±0
Castilian Party–Castilian Unity (PCAS–UdCa)^{3}	381	0.10	–0.10	0	±0
Blank ballots	5,445	1.49	+0.07		
Total	365,022			9	–3
Valid votes	365,022	97.69	–1.05		
Invalid votes	8,640	2.31	+1.05		
Votes cast / turnout	373,662	71.96	–4.75		
Abstentions	145,608	28.04	+4.75		
Registered voters	519,270				
Sources
Footnotes: ^{1} Let's Win Castilla–La Mancha–The Greens–United Left results are compared to United Left of Castilla–La Mancha totals in the 2011 election.; ^{2} Union of Independent Citizens results are compared to the combined totals of Union of Independent Citizens of Toledo in the 2011 election.; ^{3} Castilian Party–Castilian Unity results are compared to Castilian Party totals in the 2011 election.

=== 2011 ===
Summary of the 22 May 2011 Cortes of Castilla–La Mancha election results in Toledo
Parties and alliances	Popular vote			Seats	
Parties and alliances	Votes	%	±pp	Total	+/−
People's Party (PP)	190,410	49.11	+5.45	6	+1
Spanish Socialist Workers' Party (PSOE)	166,249	42.88	–8.09	6	±0
United Left of Castilla–La Mancha (IUCLM)	14,094	3.63	+0.20	0	±0
Union, Progress and Democracy (UPyD)	5,777	1.49	New	0	±0
The Greens–Green Group (LV–GV)	2,375	0.61	New	0	±0
Union of Independent Citizens of Toledo (UCIT)	1,430	0.37	New	0	±0
Anti-Bullfighting Party Against Mistreatment of Animals (PACMA)	1,133	0.29	New	0	±0
Castilian Party (PCAS)^{1}	773	0.20	+0.01	0	±0
Blank ballots	5,499	1.42	+0.44		
Total	387,740			12	+1
Valid votes	387,740	98.74	–0.54		
Invalid votes	4,967	1.26	+0.54		
Votes cast / turnout	392,707	76.71	+0.55		
Abstentions	119,258	23.29	–0.55		
Registered voters	511,965				
Sources
Footnotes: ^{1} Castilian Party results are compared to Commoners' Land totals in the 2007 election.

=== 2007 ===
Summary of the 27 May 2007 Cortes of Castilla–La Mancha election results in Toledo
Parties and alliances	Popular vote			Seats	
Parties and alliances	Votes	%	±pp	Total	+/−
Spanish Socialist Workers' Party (PSOE)	183,583	50.97	–7.81	6	–1
People's Party (PP)	157,230	43.66	+7.51	5	+1
United Left–Left of Castilla–La Mancha (IU–ICAM)	12,358	3.43	+0.57	0	±0
The Greens of Europe (LVE)	1,845	0.51	New	0	±0
Commoners' Land (TC)	701	0.19	+0.08	0	±0
Independent Regional Unity (URI)	610	0.17	±0.00	0	±0
Humanist Party (PH)	286	0.08	New	0	±0
Blank ballots	3,537	0.98	–0.05		
Total	360,150			47	±0
Valid votes	360,150	99.28	–0.10		
Invalid votes	2,630	0.72	+0.10		
Votes cast / turnout	362,780	76.16	–2.04		
Abstentions	113,544	23.84	+2.04		
Registered voters	476,324				

=== 2003 ===
Summary of the 25 May 2003 Cortes of Castilla–La Mancha election results in Toledo
Parties and alliances	Popular vote			Seats	
Parties and alliances	Votes	%	±pp	Total	+/−
Spanish Socialist Workers' Party (PSOE)	203,462	58.78	+4.67	7	+1
People's Party (PP)	125,133	36.15	–3.76	4	–1
United Left–Left of Castilla–La Mancha (IU–ICAM)	9,898	2.86	–0.37	0	±0
The Greens–Green Group (LV–GV)	1,684	0.49	+0.17	0	±0
Family and Life Party (PFyV)	866	0.25	New	0	±0
Independent Regional Unity (URI)	580	0.17	–0.02	0	±0
Commoners' Land–Castilian Nationalist Party (TC–PNC)	386	0.11	+0.01	0	±0
National Democracy (DN)	293	0.08	New	0	±0
Castilian Left (IzCa)	288	0.08	New	0	±0
Blank ballots	3,569	1.03	–0.12		
Total	346,159			11	±0
Valid votes	346,159	99.38	±0.00		
Invalid votes	2,154	0.62	±0.00		
Votes cast / turnout	348,313	78.20	+0.70		
Abstentions	97,098	21.80	–0.70		
Registered voters	445,411				

=== 1999 ===
Summary of the 13 June 1999 Cortes of Castilla–La Mancha election results in Toledo
Parties and alliances	Popular vote			Seats	
Parties and alliances	Votes	%	±pp	Total	+/−
Spanish Socialist Workers' Party–Progressives (PSOE–p)	176,528	54.11	+6.54	6	±0
People's Party (PP)	130,218	39.91	–3.59	5	±0
United Left–Left of Castilla–La Mancha (IU–ICAM)	10,537	3.23	–3.05	0	±0
The Greens–Green Group (LV–GV)	1,034	0.32	–0.14	0	±0
Spanish Democratic Party (PADE)	813	0.25	New	0	±0
Centrist Union–Democratic and Social Centre (UC–CDS)	700	0.21	–0.16	0	±0
Independent Regional Unity (URI)	635	0.19	+0.07	0	±0
Union of Talavera and Region (UTyC)	474	0.15	New	0	±0
Spanish Phalanx of the CNSO (FE–JONS)	400	0.12	+0.02	0	±0
Regionalist Party of Castilla–La Mancha (PRCM)	382	0.12	–0.08	0	±0
Party of Self-employed of Spain and Spanish Independent Groups (PAE–I)	336	0.10	New	0	±0
Commoners' Land–Castilian Nationalist Party (TC–PNC)	313	0.10	+0.01	0	±0
Humanist Party (PH)	142	0.04	New	0	±0
Blank ballots	3,745	1.15	+0.25		
Total	326,257			11	±0
Valid votes	326,257	99.38	+0.13		
Invalid votes	2,032	0.62	–0.13		
Votes cast / turnout	328,289	77.50	–2.86		
Abstentions	95,285	22.50	+2.86		
Registered voters	423,574				

=== 1995 ===
Summary of the 28 May 1995 Cortes of Castilla–La Mancha election results in Toledo
Parties and alliances	Popular vote			Seats	
Parties and alliances	Votes	%	±pp	Total	+/−
Spanish Socialist Workers' Party (PSOE)	151,801	47.57	–3.70	6	±0
People's Party (PP)	138,813	43.50	+5.42	5	±0
United Left–Left of Castilla–La Mancha (IU–ICAM)	20,042	6.28	+0.51	0	±0
The Greens–Green Group (LV–GV)	1,474	0.46	New	0	±0
Action for Talavera Region (ACTAL)	1,270	0.40	–0.46	0	±0
Centrist Union (UC)	1,186	0.37	–1.78	0	±0
Regionalist Party of Castilla–La Mancha (PRCM)	649	0.20	–0.15	0	±0
Independent Regional Unity (URI)	391	0.12	New	0	±0
Spanish Phalanx of the CNSO (FE–JONS)	327	0.10	New	0	±0
Commoners' Land–Castilian Nationalist Party (TC–PNC)	289	0.09	New	0	±0
Blank ballots	2,863	0.90	+0.03		
Total	319,105			11	±0
Valid votes	319,105	99.25	–0.04		
Invalid votes	2,398	0.75	+0.04		
Votes cast / turnout	321,503	80.36	+4.64		
Abstentions	78,568	19.64	–4.64		
Registered voters	400,071				

=== 1991 ===
Summary of the 26 May 1991 Cortes of Castilla–La Mancha election results in Toledo
Parties and alliances	Popular vote			Seats	
Parties and alliances	Votes	%	±pp	Total	+/−
Spanish Socialist Workers' Party (PSOE)	145,861	51.27	+6.21	6	±0
People's Party (PP)^{1}	108,339	38.08	+0.64	5	+1
United Left (IU)	16,406	5.77	–0.03	0	±0
Democratic and Social Centre (CDS)	6,110	2.15	–8.05	0	–1
Action for Talavera (ACTAL)	2,441	0.86	New	0	±0
The Greens Ecologist–Humanist List (LVLE–H)^{2}	1,899	0.67	+0.49	0	±0
Regionalist Party of Castilla–La Mancha (PRCM)	984	0.35	New	0	±0
Blank ballots	2,475	0.87	+0.05		
Total	284,515			11	±0
Valid votes	284,515	99.29	+0.49		
Invalid votes	2,047	0.71	–0.49		
Votes cast / turnout	286,562	75.72	–3.28		
Abstentions	91,893	24.28	+3.28		
Registered voters	378,455				
Sources
Footnotes: ^{1} People's Party results are compared to the combined totals of People's Alliance and People's Democratic Party in the 1987 election.; ^{2} The Greens Ecologist–Humanist List results are compared to Humanist Platform totals in the 1987 election.

=== 1987 ===
Summary of the 10 June 1987 Cortes of Castilla–La Mancha election results in Toledo
Parties and alliances	Popular vote			Seats	
Parties and alliances	Votes	%	±pp	Total	+/−
Spanish Socialist Workers' Party (PSOE)	128,713	45.06	+1.40	6	+1
People's Alliance (AP)^{1}	105,232	36.84	–5.27	4	–1
Democratic and Social Centre (CDS)	29,132	10.20	+6.77	1	+1
United Left (IU)^{2}	16,554	5.80	–1.88	0	±0
People's Democratic Party (PDP)	1,718	0.60	New	0	±0
Workers' Party of Spain–Communist Unity (PTE–UC)	933	0.33	New	0	±0
Humanist Platform (PH)	512	0.18	New	0	±0
Social Democratic Party of Castilla–La Mancha (PSDCLM)	512	0.18	New	0	±0
Blank ballots	2,352	0.82	+0.28		
Total	285,658			11	+1
Valid votes	285,658	98.80	–0.21		
Invalid votes	3,456	1.20	+0.21		
Votes cast / turnout	289,114	79.00	+1.53		
Abstentions	76,845	21.00	–1.53		
Registered voters	365,959				
Sources
Footnotes: ^{1} People's Alliance results are compared to People's Coalition totals in the 1983 election.; ^{2} United Left results are compared to Communist Party of Spain totals in the 1983 election.

=== 1983 ===
Summary of the 8 May 1983 Cortes of Castilla–La Mancha election results in Toledo
Parties and alliances	Popular vote			Seats	
Parties and alliances	Votes	%	±pp	Total	+/−
Spanish Socialist Workers' Party (PSOE)	118,295	43.66	n/a	5	n/a
People's Coalition (AP–PDP–UL)	114,090	42.11	n/a	5	n/a
Communist Party of Spain (PCE)	20,809	7.68	n/a	0	n/a
Democratic and Social Centre (CDS)	9,299	3.43	n/a	0	n/a
Liberal Democratic Party (PDL)	6,958	2.57	n/a	0	n/a
Blank ballots	1,471	0.54	n/a		
Total	270,922			10	n/a
Valid votes	270,922	99.01	n/a		
Invalid votes	2,699	0.99	n/a		
Votes cast / turnout	273,621	77.47	n/a		
Abstentions	79,581	22.53	n/a		
Registered voters	353,202				
