= Ciudad Real (Cortes of Castilla–La Mancha constituency) =

Coordinates: 39°00′N 4°00′W

- Cortes of Castilla–La Mancha; Electoral constituency
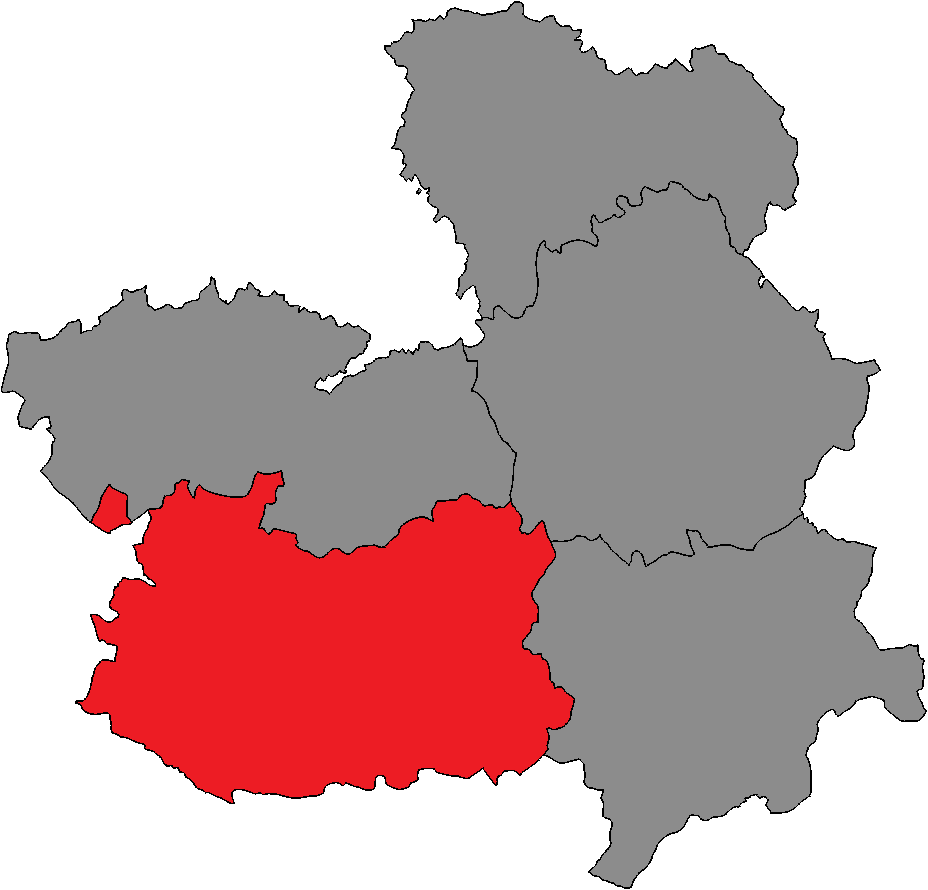
- Location of Ciudad Real within Castilla–La Mancha
- Province: Ciudad Real
- Autonomous community: Castilla–La Mancha
- Population: ▲492,640 (2024)
- Electorate: ▼391,211 (2023)
- Major settlements: Ciudad Real, Puertollano, Alcázar de San Juan

Current constituency
- Created: 1983
- Seats: 10 (1983–1986); 11 (1986–2012); 12 (2012–2014); 8 (2014–2019); 7 (2019–present)
- Members: PSOE (4); PP (2); Vox (1)

Ciudad Real is one of the five constituencies (Spanish: circunscripciones) represented in the Cortes of Castilla–La Mancha, the regional legislature of the autonomous community of Castilla–La Mancha. The constituency currently elects eight deputies. Its boundaries correspond to those of the Spanish province of Ciudad Real. The electoral system uses the D'Hondt method and closed-list proportional representation, with a minimum threshold of three percent.

== Electoral system ==
The constituency was created as per the Statute of Autonomy of Castilla–La Mancha of 1982 and was first contested in the 1983 regional election. The Statute provided for the five provinces in Castilla–La Mancha—Albacete, Ciudad Real, Cuenca, Guadalajara and Toledo—to be established as multi-member districts in the Cortes of Castilla–La Mancha, with this regulation being maintained under the 1986 regional electoral law. Each constituency is entitled to an initial minimum of three seats, with the remaining 18—22 from 1986 to 1998—being distributed in proportion to their populations. In 1983 and from 1998 to 2014, each constituency was allocated a fixed number of seats: 9 for Albacete (10 from 1998 to 2014), 10 for Ciudad Real (11 from 1998 to 2012; 12 until 2014), 8 for Cuenca (8 from 2012 to 2014), 7 for Guadalajara (8 from 2007 to 2012; 9 until 2014) and 10 for Toledo (11 from 1998 to 2007; 12 from 2007 to 2012; 13 until 2014).

Voting is on the basis of universal suffrage, which comprises all nationals over eighteen, registered in Castilla–La Mancha and in full enjoyment of their political rights. Amendments to the electoral law in 2011 required for Castilian-Manchegan people abroad to apply for voting before being permitted to vote, a system known as "begged" or expat vote (Spanish: Voto rogado) which was abolished in 2022. Seats are elected using the D'Hondt method and a closed list proportional representation, with an electoral threshold of three percent of valid votes—which includes blank ballots—being applied in each constituency. The only exception was in 1983, when a five percent threshold was applied regionally. The use of the D'Hondt method might result in a higher effective threshold, depending on the district magnitude.

The electoral law allows for parties and federations registered in the interior ministry, coalitions and groupings of electors to present lists of candidates. Parties and federations intending to form a coalition ahead of an election are required to inform the relevant Electoral Commission within ten days of the election call—fifteen before 1985—whereas groupings of electors need to secure the signature of at least one percent of the electorate in the constituencies for which they seek election—one-thousandth of the electorate, with a compulsory minimum of 500 signatures, until 1985—disallowing electors from signing for more than one list of candidates.

== Deputies ==
Deputies 1983–present
Key to parties PSOE CDS Cs PP CP AP Vox
Cortes	Election	Distribution
1st	1983	6 / 4
2nd	1987	6 / 1 / 4
3rd	1991	7 / 4
4th	1995	6 / 5
5th	1999	6 / 5
6th	2003	7 / 4
7th	2007	7 / 4
8th	2011	6 / 5
9th	2015	4 / 4
10th	2019	4 / 1 / 2
11th	2023	4 / 2 / 1

== Regional elections ==
=== 2023 ===
Summary of the 28 May 2023 Cortes of Castilla–La Mancha election results in Ciudad Real
Parties and alliances	Popular vote			Seats	
Parties and alliances	Votes	%	±pp	Total	+/−
Spanish Socialist Workers' Party (PSOE)	125,306	46.59	+0.33	4	±0
People's Party (PP)	92,873	34.53	+5.97	2	±0
Vox (Vox)	32,247	11.99	+6.01	1	+1
United We Can Castilla–La Mancha (Unidas Podemos CLM)	9,706	3.61	–2.54	0	±0
Animalist Party with the Environment (PACMA)^{1}	2,553	0.95	+0.26	0	±0
Citizens–Party of the Citizenry (CS)	2,431	0.90	–10.36	0	–1
Blank ballots	3,854	1.43	+0.57		
Total	268,970			7	±0
Valid votes	268,970	98.23	–0.65		
Invalid votes	3,044	1.77	+0.65		
Votes cast / turnout	273,807	69.99	+1.56		
Abstentions	117,404	30.01	–1.56		
Registered voters	391,211				
Sources
Footnotes: ^{1} Animalist Party with the Environment results are compared to Animalist Party Against Mistreatment of Animals totals in the 2019 election.

=== 2019 ===
Summary of the 26 May 2019 Cortes of Castilla–La Mancha election results in Ciudad Real
Parties and alliances	Popular vote			Seats	
Parties and alliances	Votes	%	±pp	Total	+/−
Spanish Socialist Workers' Party (PSOE)	124,028	46.26	+7.42	4	±0
People's Party (PP)	76,569	28.56	–8.52	2	–2
Citizens–Party of the Citizenry (Cs)	30,196	11.26	+3.79	1	+1
United We Can–United Left–Equo CLM (Podemos–IU–Equo)^{1}	16,480	6.15	–5.35	0	±0
Vox (Vox)	16,032	5.98	+5.63	0	±0
Animalist Party Against Mistreatment of Animals (PACMA)	1,862	0.69	±0.00	0	±0
For a Fairer World (PUM+J)	342	0.13	New	0	±0
Traditions and Rural World (ANATUR–UDEC)	269	0.10	New	0	±0
Blank ballots	2,308	0.86	–1.11		
Total	268,086			7	–1
Valid votes	268,086	98.88	+1.29		
Invalid votes	3,044	1.12	–1.29		
Votes cast / turnout	271,130	68.43	–2.01		
Abstentions	125,109	31.57	+2.01		
Registered voters	396,239				
Sources
Footnotes: ^{1} United We Can–United Left–Equo CLM results are compared to the combined totals of We Can and Let's Win Castilla–La Mancha–The Greens–United Left in the 2015 election.

=== 2015 ===
Summary of the 24 May 2015 Cortes of Castilla–La Mancha election results in Ciudad Real
Parties and alliances	Popular vote			Seats	
Parties and alliances	Votes	%	±pp	Total	+/−
Spanish Socialist Workers' Party (PSOE)	107,829	38.84	–7.50	4	–2
People's Party (PP)	102,940	37.08	–9.05	4	–1
We Can (Podemos)	23,423	8.44	New	0	±0
Citizens–Party of the Citizenry (C's)	20,741	7.47	New	0	±0
Let's Win Castilla–La Mancha–The Greens–United Left (Ganemos–LV–IU)^{1}	8,502	3.06	–0.28	0	±0
Union, Progress and Democracy (UPyD)	3,182	1.15	–0.43	0	±0
Union of Independent Citizens (UCIN)	2,058	0.74	New	0	±0
Animalist Party Against Mistreatment of Animals (PACMA)	1,918	0.69	+0.30	0	±0
Vox (Vox)	983	0.35	New	0	±0
Castilian Party–Castilian Unity (PCAS–UdCa)^{2}	293	0.11	–0.28	0	±0
Independents and Liberals for Manzanares (LIM)	287	0.10	New	0	±0
Blank ballots	5,483	1.97	+0.32		
Total	277,639			8	–3
Valid votes	277,639	97.59	–1.19		
Invalid votes	6,860	2.41	+1.19		
Votes cast / turnout	284,499	70.44	–4.48		
Abstentions	119,405	29.56	+4.48		
Registered voters	403,904				
Sources
Footnotes: ^{1} Let's Win Castilla–La Mancha–The Greens–United Left results are compared to United Left of Castilla–La Mancha totals in the 2011 election.; ^{2} Castilian Party–Castilian Unity results are compared to the combined totals of Castilian Party and Castilian Unity in the 2011 election.

=== 2011 ===
Summary of the 22 May 2011 Cortes of Castilla–La Mancha election results in Ciudad Real
Parties and alliances	Popular vote			Seats	
Parties and alliances	Votes	%	±pp	Total	+/−
Spanish Socialist Workers' Party (PSOE)	138,372	46.34	–9.35	6	–1
People's Party (PP)	137,739	46.13	+6.89	5	+1
United Left of Castilla–La Mancha (IUCLM)	9,972	3.34	+0.44	0	±0
Union, Progress and Democracy (UPyD)	4,719	1.58	New	0	±0
Anti-Bullfighting Party Against Mistreatment of Animals (PACMA)	1,170	0.39	New	0	±0
Castilian Unity (UdCa)	745	0.25	–0.18	0	±0
Citizens of Democratic Centre (CCD)	507	0.17	New	0	±0
Castilian Party (PCAS)^{1}	430	0.14	–0.03	0	±0
Blank ballots	4,917	1.65	+0.29		
Total	298,571			11	±0
Valid votes	298,571	98.78	–0.50		
Invalid votes	3,692	1.22	+0.50		
Votes cast / turnout	302,263	74.92	+3.09		
Abstentions	101,175	25.08	–3.09		
Registered voters	403,438				
Sources
Footnotes: ^{1} Castilian Party results are compared to Commoners' Land totals in the 2007 election.

=== 2007 ===
Summary of the 27 May 2007 Cortes of Castilla–La Mancha election results in Ciudad Real
Parties and alliances	Popular vote			Seats	
Parties and alliances	Votes	%	±pp	Total	+/−
Spanish Socialist Workers' Party (PSOE)	156,721	55.69	–4.72	7	±0
People's Party (PP)	110,411	39.24	+4.64	4	±0
United Left–Left of Castilla–La Mancha (IU–ICAM)	8,164	2.90	+0.14	0	±0
Castilian Unity (UdCa)	1,213	0.43	–0.04	0	±0
The Phalanx (FE)	588	0.21	+0.05	0	±0
Commoners' Land (TC)	490	0.17	–0.06	0	±0
Blank ballots	3,818	1.36	+0.08		
Total	281,405			11	±0
Valid votes	281,405	99.28	±0.00		
Invalid votes	2,037	0.72	±0.00		
Votes cast / turnout	283,442	71.53	–2.27		
Abstentions	112,831	28.47	+2.27		
Registered voters	396,273				

=== 2003 ===
Summary of the 25 May 2003 Cortes of Castilla–La Mancha election results in Ciudad Real
Parties and alliances	Popular vote			Seats	
Parties and alliances	Votes	%	±pp	Total	+/−
Spanish Socialist Workers' Party (PSOE)	173,455	60.41	+5.92	7	+1
People's Party (PP)	99,350	34.60	–5.40	4	–1
United Left–Left of Castilla–La Mancha (IU–ICAM)	7,922	2.76	–0.40	0	±0
Castilian Unity (UdCa)	1,344	0.47	New	0	±0
Commoners' Land–Castilian Nationalist Party (TC–PNC)	667	0.23	+0.08	0	±0
The Phalanx (FE)	472	0.16	New	0	±0
Castilian Left (IzCa)	234	0.08	New	0	±0
Blank ballots	3,674	1.28	+0.01		
Total	287,118			11	±0
Valid votes	287,118	99.28	–0.05		
Invalid votes	2,070	0.72	+0.05		
Votes cast / turnout	289,188	73.80	+1.66		
Abstentions	102,667	26.20	–1.66		
Registered voters	391,855				

=== 1999 ===
Summary of the 13 June 1999 Cortes of Castilla–La Mancha election results in Ciudad Real
Parties and alliances	Popular vote			Seats	
Parties and alliances	Votes	%	±pp	Total	+/−
Spanish Socialist Workers' Party–Progressives (PSOE–p)	153,484	54.49	+7.32	6	±0
People's Party (PP)	112,678	40.00	–2.99	5	±0
United Left–Left of Castilla–La Mancha (IU–ICAM)	8,892	3.16	–4.58	0	±0
Regionalist Party of Castilla–La Mancha (PRCM)	934	0.33	–0.12	0	±0
Centrist Union–Democratic and Social Centre (UC–CDS)	694	0.25	–0.18	0	±0
Commoners' Land–Castilian Nationalist Party (TC–PNC)	415	0.15	+0.04	0	±0
Spanish Phalanx of the CNSO (FE–JONS)	283	0.10	New	0	±0
Humanist Party (PH)	273	0.10	New	0	±0
Spanish Democratic Party (PADE)	258	0.09	New	0	±0
Party of Self-employed of Spain and Spanish Independent Groups (PAE–I)	174	0.06	New	0	±0
Blank ballots	3,584	1.27	+0.29		
Total	281,669			11	±0
Valid votes	281,669	99.33	+0.11		
Invalid votes	1,903	0.67	–0.11		
Votes cast / turnout	283,572	72.14	–4.49		
Abstentions	109,528	27.86	+4.49		
Registered voters	393,100				

=== 1995 ===
Summary of the 28 May 1995 Cortes of Castilla–La Mancha election results in Ciudad Real
Parties and alliances	Popular vote			Seats	
Parties and alliances	Votes	%	±pp	Total	+/−
Spanish Socialist Workers' Party (PSOE)	136,243	47.17	–9.26	6	–1
People's Party (PP)	124,181	42.99	+11.27	5	+1
United Left–Left of Castilla–La Mancha (IU–ICAM)	22,346	7.74	+2.11	0	±0
Regionalist Party of Castilla–La Mancha (PRCM)	1,313	0.45	New	0	±0
Centrist Union (UC)	1,251	0.43	–4.29	0	±0
Action for Talavera Region (ACTAL)	359	0.12	New	0	±0
Commoners' Land–Castilian Nationalist Party (TC–PNC)	328	0.11	New	0	±0
Blank ballots	2,822	0.98	+0.12		
Total	288,843			11	±0
Valid votes	288,843	99.22	–0.02		
Invalid votes	2,273	0.78	+0.02		
Votes cast / turnout	291,116	76.63	+7.34		
Abstentions	88,799	23.37	–7.34		
Registered voters	379,915				

=== 1991 ===
Summary of the 26 May 1991 Cortes of Castilla–La Mancha election results in Ciudad Real
Parties and alliances	Popular vote			Seats	
Parties and alliances	Votes	%	±pp	Total	+/−
Spanish Socialist Workers' Party (PSOE)	144,494	56.43	+6.32	7	+1
People's Party (PP)^{1}	81,214	31.72	+0.62	4	±0
United Left (IU)	14,420	5.63	+0.11	0	±0
Democratic and Social Centre (CDS)	12,096	4.72	–6.79	0	–1
Regionalist Unitary Party (PUR)	1,052	0.41	–0.05	0	±0
Social Democratic Party of Castilla–La Mancha (PSDCLM)	581	0.23	–0.08	0	±0
Blank ballots	2,200	0.86	–0.13		
Total	256,057			11	±0
Valid votes	256,057	99.24	+0.35		
Invalid votes	1,965	0.76	–0.35		
Votes cast / turnout	258,022	69.29	–2.78		
Abstentions	114,358	30.71	+2.78		
Registered voters	372,380				
Sources
Footnotes: ^{1} People's Party results are compared to the combined totals of People's Alliance and People's Democratic Party in the 1987 election.

=== 1987 ===
Summary of the 10 June 1987 Cortes of Castilla–La Mancha election results in Ciudad Real
Parties and alliances	Popular vote			Seats	
Parties and alliances	Votes	%	±pp	Total	+/−
Spanish Socialist Workers' Party (PSOE)	129,581	50.11	–0.37	6	±0
People's Alliance (AP)^{1}	74,690	28.88	–10.21	4	±0
Democratic and Social Centre (CDS)	29,773	11.51	+8.02	1	+1
United Left (IU)^{2}	14,272	5.52	–0.74	0	±0
People's Democratic Party (PDP)	5,734	2.22	New	0	±0
Regionalist Unitary Party (PUR)	1,183	0.46	New	0	±0
Social Democratic Party of Castilla–La Mancha (PSDCLM)	805	0.31	New	0	±0
Blank ballots	2,568	0.99	+0.31		
Total	258,606			11	+1
Valid votes	258,606	98.89	+0.13		
Invalid votes	2,909	1.11	–0.13		
Votes cast / turnout	261,515	72.07	+2.45		
Abstentions	101,323	27.93	–2.45		
Registered voters	362,838				
Sources
Footnotes: ^{1} People's Alliance results are compared to People's Coalition totals in the 1983 election.; ^{2} United Left results are compared to Communist Party of Spain totals in the 1983 election.

=== 1983 ===
Summary of the 8 May 1983 Cortes of Castilla–La Mancha election results in Ciudad Real
Parties and alliances	Popular vote			Seats	
Parties and alliances	Votes	%	±pp	Total	+/−
Spanish Socialist Workers' Party (PSOE)	122,580	50.48	n/a	6	n/a
People's Coalition (AP–PDP–UL)	94,929	39.09	n/a	4	n/a
Communist Party of Spain (PCE)	15,199	6.26	n/a	0	n/a
Democratic and Social Centre (CDS)	8,475	3.49	n/a	0	n/a
Blank ballots	1,657	0.68	n/a		
Total	242,840			10	n/a
Valid votes	242,840	98.76	n/a		
Invalid votes	3,040	1.24	n/a		
Votes cast / turnout	245,880	69.62	n/a		
Abstentions	107,307	30.38	n/a		
Registered voters	353,187				
