= 2007 Castilian-Manchegan regional election =

Election in the Spanish region of Castilla–La Mancha

- 27 May 2007

All 47 seats in the Cortes of Castilla–La Mancha 24 seats needed for a majority
- Opinion polls
- Registered: 1,506,504 ▲4.0%
- Turnout: 1,110,885 (73.7%) ▼2.5 pp
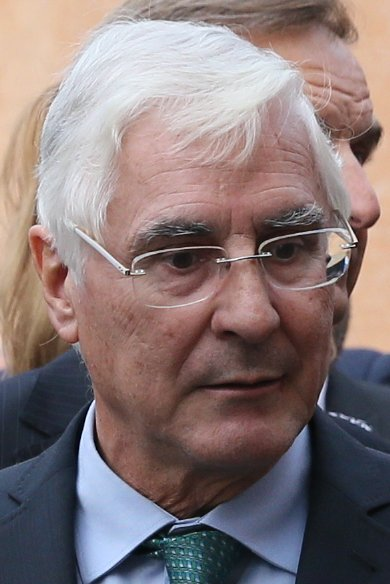

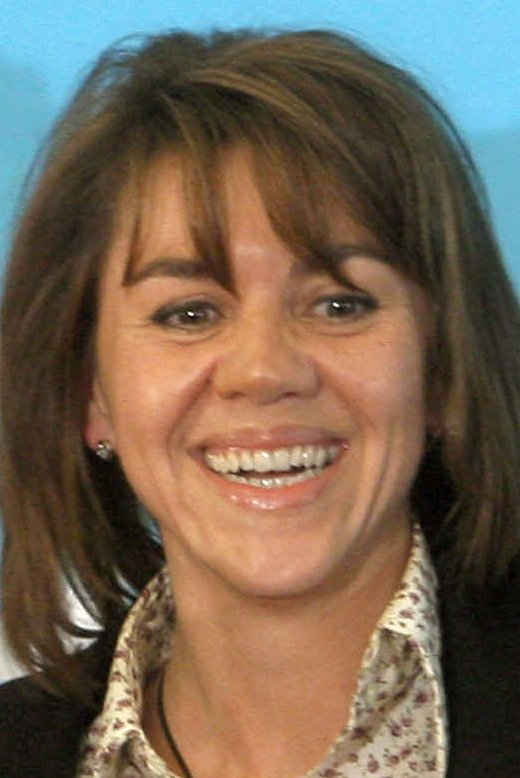
	First party	Second party
Leader	José María Barreda	María Dolores de Cospedal
Party	PSOE	PP
Leader since	29 April 2004	14 June 2006
Leader's seat	Toledo	Toledo
Last election	29 seats, 57.8%	18 seats, 36.7%
Seats won	26	21
Seat change	▼3	▲3
Popular vote	572,849	467,319
Percentage	52.0%	42.4%
Swing	▼5.8 pp	▲5.7 pp
- Constituency results map for the Cortes of Castilla–La Mancha
President before election
José María Barreda
PSOE
Elected President
José María Barreda
PSOE

A regional election was held in Castilla–La Mancha on 27 May 2007 to elect the 7th Cortes of the autonomous community. All 47 seats in the Cortes were up for election. It was held concurrently with regional elections in twelve other autonomous communities and local elections all across Spain.

== Overview ==
=== Electoral system ===
The Cortes of Castilla–La Mancha were the devolved, unicameral legislature of the autonomous community of Castilla–La Mancha, having legislative power in regional matters as defined by the Spanish Constitution and the Castilian-Manchegan Statute of Autonomy, as well as the ability to vote confidence in or withdraw it from a President of the Junta of Communities. Voting for the Cortes was on the basis of universal suffrage, which comprised all nationals over 18 years of age, registered in Castilla–La Mancha and in full enjoyment of their political rights.

The 47 members of the Cortes of Castilla–La Mancha were elected using the D'Hondt method and a closed list proportional representation, with an electoral threshold of three percent of valid votes—which included blank ballots—being applied in each constituency. Additionally, the use of the D'Hondt method might result in an effective threshold over three percent, depending on the district magnitude. Seats were allocated to constituencies, corresponding to the provinces of Albacete, Ciudad Real, Cuenca, Guadalajara and Toledo. Each constituency was allocated a fixed number of seats: 10 for Albacete, 11 for Ciudad Real, 8 for Cuenca, 7 for Guadalajara and 11 for Toledo.

The electoral law provided that parties, federations, coalitions and groupings of electors were allowed to present lists of candidates. However, groupings of electors were required to secure the signature of at least 1 percent of the electors registered in the constituency for which they sought election. Electors were barred from signing for more than one list of candidates. Concurrently, parties and federations intending to enter in coalition to take part jointly at an election were required to inform the relevant Electoral Commission within ten days of the election being called.

=== Election date ===
The term of the Cortes of Castilla–La Mancha expired four years after the date of their previous election. Elections to the Cortes were fixed for the fourth Sunday of May every four years. The previous election was held on 25 May 2003, setting the election date for the Cortes on 27 May 2007.

The President of the Junta of Communities had the prerogative to dissolve the Cortes of Castilla–La Mancha and call a snap election, provided that no motion of no confidence was in process, no nationwide election was due and some time requirements were met: namely, that dissolution did not occur either during the first legislative session or within the legislature's last year ahead of its scheduled expiry, nor before one year had elapsed since a previous dissolution. Any snap election held as a result of these circumstances would not alter the period to the next ordinary election, with elected lawmakers serving the remainder of its original four-year term. In the event of an investiture process failing to elect a regional President within a two-month period from the first ballot, the candidate from the party with the highest number of seats was to be deemed automatically elected.

== Opinion polls ==
The table below lists voting intention estimates in reverse chronological order, showing the most recent first and using the dates when the survey fieldwork was done, as opposed to the date of publication. Where the fieldwork dates are unknown, the date of publication is given instead. The highest percentage figure in each polling survey is displayed with its background shaded in the leading party's colour. If a tie ensues, this is applied to the figures with the highest percentages. The "Lead" column on the right shows the percentage-point difference between the parties with the highest percentages in a poll. When available, seat projections determined by the polling organisations are displayed below (or in place of) the percentages in a smaller font; 24 seats were required for an absolute majority in the Cortes of Castilla–La Mancha.

Color key:

Exit poll

Polling firm/Commissioner	Fieldwork date	Sample size	Turnout	PSOE	PP	IU–ICAM	Lead
2007 regional election	27 May 2007	—N/a	73.7	52.0; 26	42.4; 21	3.4; 0	9.6
Ipsos/RTVE–FORTA	27 May 2007	?	?	? 25/28	? 19/22	? 0	?
Opina/Cadena SER	18 May 2007	1,000	?	53.0; 26/27	41.0; 20	? 0/1	12.0
TNS Demoscopia/Antena 3	15 May 2007	?	?	56.1; 27/29	39.0; 18/20	3.6; 0	17.1
Celeste-Tel/Terra	9–15 May 2007	?	?	53.7; 26/27	41.8; 20/21	3.5; 0	11.9
Sigma Dos/El Mundo	27 Apr–8 May 2007	1,000	?	52.0; 25/27	42.3; 20/22	2.9; 0	9.7
CIS	9 Apr–6 May 2007	1,992	?	54.4; 26/28	40.7; 19/21	3.7; 0	13.7
Sigma Dos/El Mundo	16–24 Nov 2006	?	?	? 24/27	? 20/23	? 0	?
2004 EP election	13 Jun 2004	—N/a	51.5	45.8 (22)	49.7 (25)	2.7 (0)	3.9
2004 general election	14 Mar 2004	—N/a	79.9	46.5 (23)	47.4 (24)	3.4 (0)	0.9
2003 regional election	25 May 2003	—N/a	76.3	57.8; 29	36.7; 18	3.0; 0	21.1

== Results ==
=== Overall ===
← Summary of the 27 May 2007 Cortes of Castilla–La Mancha election results →
Parties and alliances	Popular vote			Seats	
Parties and alliances	Votes	%	±pp	Total	+/−
Spanish Socialist Workers' Party (PSOE)	572,849	51.96	−5.87	26	−3
People's Party (PP)	467,319	42.38	+5.72	21	+3
United Left–Left of Castilla–La Mancha (IU–ICAM)	37,753	3.42	+0.37	0	±0
The Greens of Europe (LVE)	3,542	0.32	New	0	±0
Commoners' Land (TC)	2,525	0.23	+0.03	0	±0
Castilian Unity (UdCa)	1,213	0.11	−0.01	0	±0
The Phalanx (FE)	1,071	0.10	+0.06	0	±0
Regionalist Party of Guadalajara (PRGU)	619	0.06	+0.01	0	±0
Independent Regional Unity (URI)	610	0.06	+0.01	0	±0
Humanist Party (PH)	572	0.05	+0.01	0	±0
Republican Left (IR)	410	0.04	±0.00	0	±0
Blank ballots	14,080	1.28	−0.05		
Total	1,102,563			47	±0
Valid votes	1,102,563	99.25	−0.07		
Invalid votes	8,322	0.75	+0.07		
Votes cast / turnout	1,110,885	73.74	−2.50		
Abstentions	395,619	26.26	+2.50		
Registered voters	1,506,504				

Popular vote
PSOE	51.96%
PP	42.38%
IU–ICAM	3.42%
Others	0.96%
Blank ballots	1.28%

Seats
PSOE	55.32%
PP	44.68%

=== Distribution by constituency ===
Constituency	PSOE		PP	
Constituency	%	S	%	S
Albacete	52.6	6	40.7	4
Ciudad Real	55.7	7	39.2	4
Cuenca	50.9	4	44.7	4
Guadalajara	45.8	3	46.6	4
Toledo	51.0	6	43.7	5
Total	52.0	26	42.4	21

== Aftermath ==
Investiture; José María Barreda (PSOE)
Ballot →	26 June 2007
Required majority →	24 out of 47
Yes: • PSOE (26)	26 / 47
No: • PP (21)	21 / 47
Abstentions	0 / 47
Absentees	0 / 47
