= 2003 Castilian-Manchegan regional election =

Election in the Spanish region of Castilla–La Mancha

- 25 May 2003

All 47 seats in the Cortes of Castilla–La Mancha 24 seats needed for a majority
- Opinion polls
- Registered: 1,448,289 ▲2.5%
- Turnout: 1,104,118 (76.2%) ▲1.3 pp
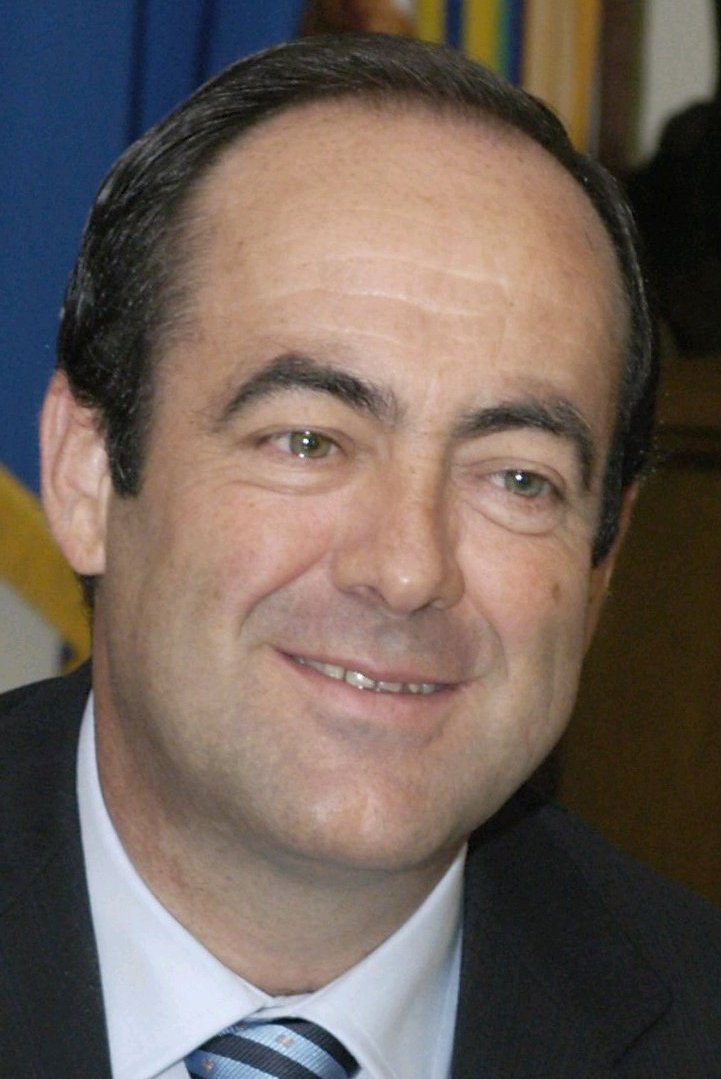

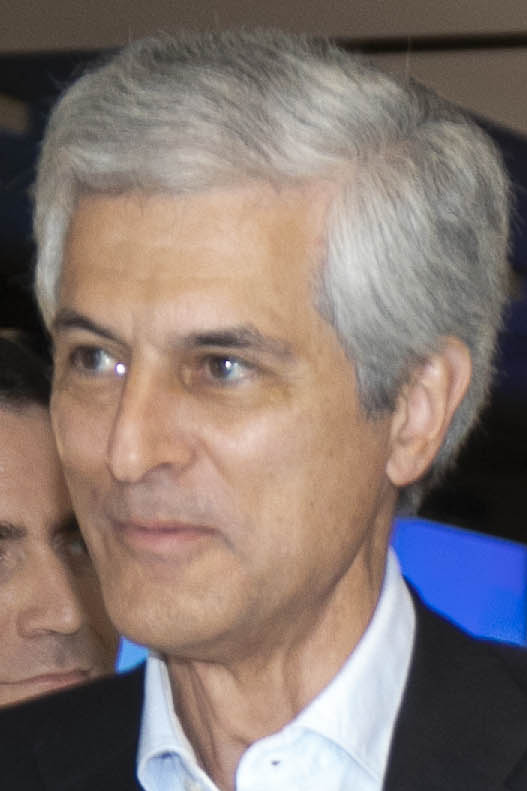
	First party	Second party
Leader	José Bono	Adolfo Suárez Illana
Party	PSOE	PP
Leader since	25 March 1983	26 May 2002
Leader's seat	Toledo	Albacete
Last election	26 seats, 53.4%	21 seats, 40.4%
Seats won	29	18
Seat change	▲3	▼3
Popular vote	634,132	402,047
Percentage	57.8%	36.7%
Swing	▲4.4 pp	▼3.7 pp
- Constituency results map for the Cortes of Castilla–La Mancha
President before election
José Bono
PSOE
Elected President
José Bono
PSOE

A regional election was held in Castilla–La Mancha on 25 May 2003 to elect the 6th Cortes of the autonomous community. All 47 seats in the Cortes were up for election. It was held concurrently with regional elections in twelve other autonomous communities and local elections all across Spain.

The election was won again by the ruling Spanish Socialist Workers' Party (PSOE), which obtained its best historical result and the largest overall majority ever in the region, with nearly 58% of the share and over 3/5 of the seats. It became, at the time, the largest vote share obtained by any party in a regional election in Spain; a record which would be exceeded by the PP results in Murcia in 2007 and 2011. The opposition People's Party (PP), despite naming former Spanish Prime Minister Adolfo Suárez' son, Adolfo Suárez Illana, as its presidential candidate, continued its decline in the region and obtained its worst election result since 1987, with only 18 seats.

As a result, José Bono was elected for his sixth and last term in office, which he would not complete. He would resign in 2004 after being appointed Minister of Defence in José Luis Rodríguez Zapatero's Cabinet, as a result of the PSOE winning the 2004 general election. Bono would be succeeded as regional premier by his deputy since 1999, José María Barreda.

== Overview ==
=== Electoral system ===
The Cortes of Castilla–La Mancha were the devolved, unicameral legislature of the autonomous community of Castilla–La Mancha, having legislative power in regional matters as defined by the Spanish Constitution and the Castilian-Manchegan Statute of Autonomy, as well as the ability to vote confidence in or withdraw it from a President of the Junta of Communities. Voting for the Cortes was on the basis of universal suffrage, which comprised all nationals over 18 years of age, registered in Castilla–La Mancha and in full enjoyment of their political rights.

The 47 members of the Cortes of Castilla–La Mancha were elected using the D'Hondt method and a closed list proportional representation, with an electoral threshold of three percent of valid votes—which included blank ballots—being applied in each constituency. Additionally, the use of the D'Hondt method might result in an effective threshold over three percent, depending on the district magnitude. Seats were allocated to constituencies, corresponding to the provinces of Albacete, Ciudad Real, Cuenca, Guadalajara and Toledo. Each constituency was allocated a fixed number of seats: 10 for Albacete, 11 for Ciudad Real, 8 for Cuenca, 7 for Guadalajara and 11 for Toledo.

The electoral law provided that parties, federations, coalitions and groupings of electors were allowed to present lists of candidates. However, groupings of electors were required to secure the signature of at least 1 percent of the electors registered in the constituency for which they sought election. Electors were barred from signing for more than one list of candidates. Concurrently, parties and federations intending to enter in coalition to take part jointly at an election were required to inform the relevant Electoral Commission within ten days of the election being called.

=== Election date ===
The term of the Cortes of Castilla–La Mancha expired four years after the date of their previous election. Elections to the Cortes were fixed for the fourth Sunday of May every four years. The previous election was held on 13 June 1999, setting the election date for the Cortes on 25 May 2003.

The President of the Junta of Communities had the prerogative to dissolve the Cortes of Castilla–La Mancha and call a snap election, provided that no motion of no confidence was in process, no nationwide election was due and some time requirements were met: namely, that dissolution did not occur either during the first legislative session or within the legislature's last year ahead of its scheduled expiry, nor before one year had elapsed since a previous dissolution. Any snap election held as a result of these circumstances would not alter the period to the next ordinary election, with elected lawmakers serving the remainder of its original four-year term. In the event of an investiture process failing to elect a regional President within a two-month period from the first ballot, the candidate from the party with the highest number of seats was to be deemed automatically elected.

== Opinion polls ==
The table below lists voting intention estimates in reverse chronological order, showing the most recent first and using the dates when the survey fieldwork was done, as opposed to the date of publication. Where the fieldwork dates are unknown, the date of publication is given instead. The highest percentage figure in each polling survey is displayed with its background shaded in the leading party's colour. If a tie ensues, this is applied to the figures with the highest percentages. The "Lead" column on the right shows the percentage-point difference between the parties with the highest percentages in a poll. When available, seat projections determined by the polling organisations are displayed below (or in place of) the percentages in a smaller font; 24 seats were required for an absolute majority in the Cortes of Castilla–La Mancha.

Color key:

Exit poll

Polling firm/Commissioner	Fieldwork date	Sample size	Turnout	PSOE	PP	IU	Lead
2003 regional election	25 May 2003	—N/a	76.3	57.8; 29	36.7; 18	3.0; 0	21.1
Sigma Dos/Antena 3	25 May 2003	?	?	? 26/29	? 18/21	–	?
Ipsos–Eco/RTVE	25 May 2003	?	?	? 28/30	? 17/19	–	?
CIS	22 Mar–28 Apr 2003	2,343	79.4	57.4; 30	35.4; 17	4.2; 0	22.0
Synovate/JCCM	25–31 Mar 2003	4,600	?	52.4	29.9	–	22.5
CIS	9 Sep–9 Oct 2002	536	79.5	54.6	39.6	3.2	15.0
Inner Social Dynamics	18–30 Sep 2002	2,009	?	58.1; 28	37.8; 19	3.7; 0	20.3
Inner Social Dynamics	10–13 Jun 2002	803	?	55.5; 27	40.0; 20	3.0; 0	15.5
Sigma Dos/El Mundo	28 Mar 2002	?	?	54.5	39.4	–	15.1
Inner Social Dynamics	19 Oct 2001	?	?	57.5	38.9	–	18.6
2000 general election	12 Mar 2000	—N/a	76.3	40.8 (20)	52.4 (27)	4.3 (0)	11.6
1999 regional election	13 Jun 1999	—N/a	74.9	53.4; 26	40.4; 21	3.4; 0	13.0

== Results ==
=== Overall ===
← Summary of the 25 May 2003 Cortes of Castilla–La Mancha election results →
Parties and alliances	Popular vote			Seats	
Parties and alliances	Votes	%	±pp	Total	+/−
Spanish Socialist Workers' Party (PSOE)	634,132	57.83	+4.41	29	+3
People's Party (PP)	402,047	36.66	−3.74	18	−3
United Left–Left of Castilla–La Mancha (IU–ICAM)	33,413	3.05	−0.36	0	±0
Commoners' Land–Castilian Nationalist Party (TC–PNC)	2,187	0.20	+0.03	0	±0
The Greens–Green Group (LV–GV)	1,684	0.15	+0.05	0	±0
Independents for Cuenca (ixC)	1,658	0.15	New	0	±0
Castilian Unity (UdCa)	1,344	0.12	New	0	±0
Family and Life Party (PFyV)	866	0.08	New	0	±0
National Democracy (DN)	802	0.07	New	0	±0
Castilian Left (IzCa)	621	0.06	New	0	±0
Independent Regional Unity (URI)	580	0.05	−0.01	0	±0
Regionalist Party of Guadalajara (PRGU)	517	0.05	±0.00	0	±0
Spanish Democratic Party (PADE)	498	0.05	−0.05	0	±0
Humanist Party (PH)	492	0.04	−0.05	0	±0
The Phalanx (FE)	472	0.04	New	0	±0
Republican Left (IR)	467	0.04	New	0	±0
Authentic Phalanx (FA)	250	0.02	New	0	±0
Blank ballots	14,554	1.33	−0.09		
Total	1,096,584			47	±0
Valid votes	1,096,584	99.32	±0.00		
Invalid votes	7,534	0.68	±0.00		
Votes cast / turnout	1,104,118	76.24	+1.39		
Abstentions	344,171	23.76	−1.39		
Registered voters	1,448,289				

Popular vote
PSOE	57.83%
PP	36.66%
IU–ICAM	3.05%
Others	1.13%
Blank ballots	1.33%

Seats
PSOE	61.70%
PP	38.30%

=== Distribution by constituency ===
Constituency	PSOE		PP	
Constituency	%	S	%	S
Albacete	58.0	6	36.4	4
Ciudad Real	60.4	7	34.6	4
Cuenca	54.0	5	40.7	3
Guadalajara	52.4	4	39.4	3
Toledo	58.8	7	36.1	4
Total	57.8	29	36.7	18

== Aftermath ==
=== Government formation ===
Investiture; José Bono (PSOE)
Ballot →	26 June 2003
Required majority →	24 out of 47
Yes: • PSOE (29)	29 / 47
No: • PP (18)	18 / 47
Abstentions	0 / 47
Absentees	0 / 47

=== 2004 investiture ===
Investiture; José María Barreda (PSOE)
Ballot →	27 April 2004
Required majority →	24 out of 47
Yes: • PSOE (29)	29 / 47
No: • PP (18)	18 / 47
Abstentions	0 / 47
Absentees	0 / 47
