= 1999 Castilian-Manchegan regional election =

Election in the Spanish region of Castilla–La Mancha

- 13 June 1999

All 47 seats in the Cortes of Castilla–La Mancha 24 seats needed for a majority
- Opinion polls
- Registered: 1,413,503 ▲4.5%
- Turnout: 1,058,010 (74.9%) ▼3.9 pp
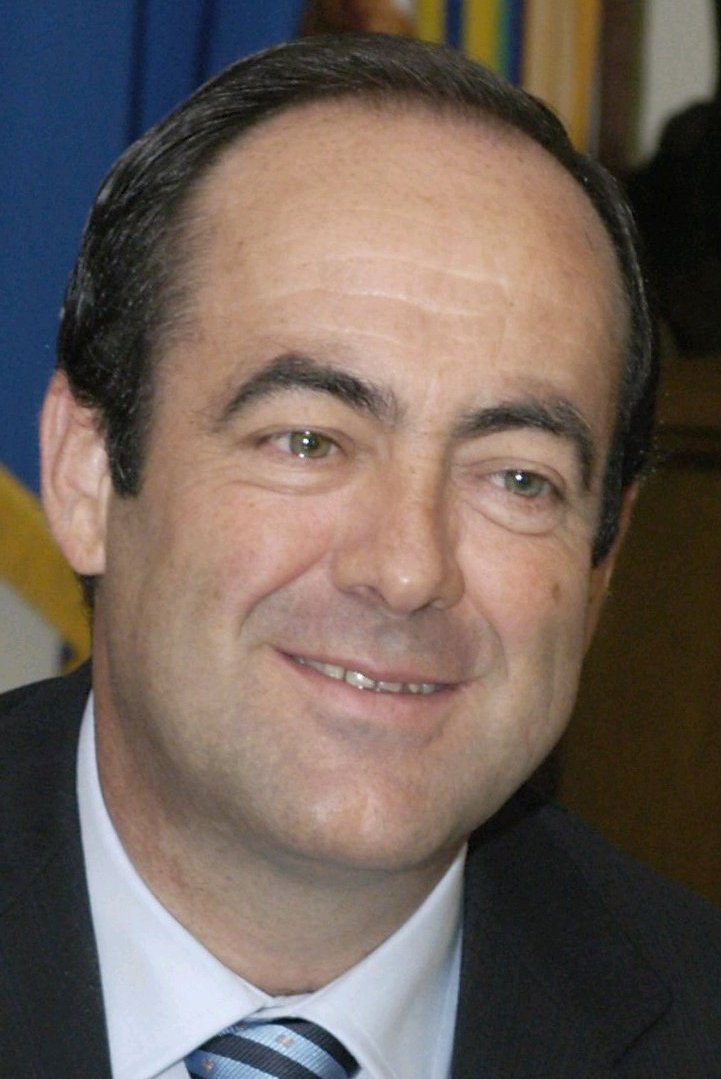

| | First party | Second party |
|---|---|---|
| Leader | José Bono | Agustín Conde |
| Party | PSOE–p | PP |
| Leader since | 25 March 1983 | 18 September 1996 |
| Leader's seat | Toledo | Toledo |
| Last election | 24 seats, 45.7% | 22 seats, 44.3% |
| Seats won | 26 | 21 |
| Seat change | ▲2 | ▼1 |
| Popular vote | 561,332 | 424,531 |
| Percentage | 53.4% | 40.4% |
| Swing | ▲7.7 pp | ▼3.9 pp |
- Constituency results map for the Cortes of Castilla–La Mancha
President before election
José Bono
PSOE
Elected President
José Bono
PSOE

A regional election was held in Castilla–La Mancha on 13 June 1999 to elect the 5th Cortes of the autonomous community. All 47 seats in the Cortes were up for election. It was held concurrently with regional elections in twelve other autonomous communities and local elections all across Spain, as well as the 1999 European Parliament election.

The Spanish Socialist Workers' Party (PSOE) recovered after its 1995 result and increased its absolute majority in the regional Cortes. The People's Party (PP), on the other hand, saw its share decrease 4 points to 40% and lost 1 seat from the previous election, not being able to maintain a part of its 1995 vote that it had received as a punishment to Felipe González's Socialist government.

United Left (IU) lost half of its votes as a result of the PSOE rise and lost its only seat in the Cortes, being expelled from the regional parliament as a result.

== Overview ==
=== Electoral system ===
The Cortes of Castilla–La Mancha were the devolved, unicameral legislature of the autonomous community of Castilla–La Mancha, having legislative power in regional matters as defined by the Spanish Constitution and the Castilian-Manchegan Statute of Autonomy, as well as the ability to vote confidence in or withdraw it from a President of the Junta of Communities. Voting for the Cortes was on the basis of universal suffrage, which comprised all nationals over 18 years of age, registered in Castilla–La Mancha and in full enjoyment of their political rights.

The 47 members of the Cortes of Castilla–La Mancha were elected using the D'Hondt method and a closed list proportional representation, with an electoral threshold of three percent of valid votes—which included blank ballots—being applied in each constituency. Additionally, the use of the D'Hondt method might result in an effective threshold over three percent, depending on the district magnitude. Seats were allocated to constituencies, corresponding to the provinces of Albacete, Ciudad Real, Cuenca, Guadalajara and Toledo. Each constituency was allocated a fixed number of seats: 10 for Albacete, 11 for Ciudad Real, 8 for Cuenca, 7 for Guadalajara and 11 for Toledo.

The electoral law provided that parties, federations, coalitions and groupings of electors were allowed to present lists of candidates. However, groupings of electors were required to secure the signature of at least 1 percent of the electors registered in the constituency for which they sought election. Electors were barred from signing for more than one list of candidates. Concurrently, parties and federations intending to enter in coalition to take part jointly at an election were required to inform the relevant Electoral Commission within ten days of the election being called.

=== Election date ===
The term of the Cortes of Castilla–La Mancha expired four years after the date of their previous election. Elections to the Cortes were fixed for the fourth Sunday of May every four years. Legal amendments introduced in 1998 allowed for these to be held together with European Parliament elections, provided that they were scheduled for within a four month-timespan. The previous election was held on 28 May 1995, setting the election date for the Cortes concurrently with a European Parliament election on 13 June 1999.

After legal amendments in 1997, the President of the Junta of Communities was granted the prerogative to dissolve the Cortes of Castilla–La Mancha and call a snap election, provided that no motion of no confidence was in process, no nationwide election was due and some time requirements were met: namely, that dissolution did not occur either during the first legislative session or within the legislature's last year ahead of its scheduled expiry, nor before one year had elapsed since a previous dissolution. Any snap election held as a result of these circumstances would not alter the period to the next ordinary election, with elected lawmakers serving the remainder of its original four-year term. In the event of an investiture process failing to elect a regional President within a two-month period from the first ballot, the candidate from the party with the highest number of seats was to be deemed automatically elected.

== Opinion polls ==
The table below lists voting intention estimates in reverse chronological order, showing the most recent first and using the dates when the survey fieldwork was done, as opposed to the date of publication. Where the fieldwork dates are unknown, the date of publication is given instead. The highest percentage figure in each polling survey is displayed with its background shaded in the leading party's colour. If a tie ensues, this is applied to the figures with the highest percentages. The "Lead" column on the right shows the percentage-point difference between the parties with the highest percentages in a poll. When available, seat projections determined by the polling organisations are displayed below (or in place of) the percentages in a smaller font; 24 seats were required for an absolute majority in the Cortes of Castilla–La Mancha.

| Polling firm/Commissioner | Fieldwork date | Sample size | Turnout | PSOE | PP | IU | Lead |
|---|---|---|---|---|---|---|---|
| 1999 regional election | 13 Jun 1999 | —N/a | 74.9 | 53.4; 26 | 40.4; 21 | 3.4; 0 | 13.0 |
| Eco Consulting/ABC | 24 May–2 Jun 1999 | ? | ? | 44.4; 22/23 | 45.5; 23/24 | 7.4; 1 | 1.1 |
| Demoscopia/El País | 26 May–1 Jun 1999 | ? | 74 | 51.3; 25/26 | 43.6; 21/22 | 4.8; 0 | 7.7 |
| Sigma Dos/El Mundo | 25–29 May 1999 | 1,000 | ? | 48.9; 24/26 | 44.0; 21/23 | 4.6; 0 | 4.9 |
| CIS | 3–21 May 1999 | 1,879 | 76.4 | 46.8; 24 | 44.4; 22 | 6.3; 1 | 2.4 |
| 1996 general election | 3 Mar 1996 | —N/a | 83.1 | 42.6 (21) | 47.2 (23) | 8.4 (3) | 4.6 |
| 1995 regional election | 28 May 1995 | —N/a | 78.8 | 45.7; 24 | 44.3; 22 | 7.6; 1 | 1.4 |

== Results ==
=== Overall ===
← Summary of the 13 June 1999 Cortes of Castilla–La Mancha election results →
| Parties and alliances | Popular vote | | | Seats | |
| Parties and alliances | Votes | % | ±pp | Total | +/− |
|---|---|---|---|---|---|
| Spanish Socialist Workers' Party–Progressives (PSOE–p) | 561,332 | 53.42 | +7.72 | 26 | +2 |
| People's Party (PP) | 424,531 | 40.40 | −3.90 | 21 | −1 |
| United Left–Left of Castilla–La Mancha (IU–ICAM) | 35,881 | 3.41 | −4.19 | 0 | −1 |
| Centrist Union–Democratic and Social Centre (UC–CDS) | 2,809 | 0.27 | −0.07 | 0 | ±0 |
| Regionalist Party of Castilla–La Mancha (PRCM) | 1,919 | 0.18 | −0.11 | 0 | ±0 |
| Commoners' Land–Castilian Nationalist Party (TC–PNC) | 1,737 | 0.17 | +0.04 | 0 | ±0 |
| Spanish Phalanx of the CNSO (FE–JONS) | 1,442 | 0.14 | +0.09 | 0 | ±0 |
| Spanish Democratic Party (PADE) | 1,071 | 0.10 | New | 0 | ±0 |
| The Greens–Green Group (LV–GV) | 1,034 | 0.10 | −0.04 | 0 | ±0 |
| Manchegan Regionalist Party (PRM) | 993 | 0.09 | New | 0 | ±0 |
| Humanist Party (PH) | 967 | 0.09 | New | 0 | ±0 |
| Independent Regional Unity (URI) | 635 | 0.06 | +0.03 | 0 | ±0 |
| Party of Self-employed of Spain and Spanish Independent Groups (PAE–I) | 598 | 0.06 | New | 0 | ±0 |
| Regionalist Party of Guadalajara (PRGU) | 512 | 0.05 | ±0.00 | 0 | ±0 |
| Union of Talavera and Region (UTyC) | 474 | 0.05 | New | 0 | ±0 |
| Blank ballots | 14,929 | 1.42 | +0.37 | | |
| Total | 1,050,864 | | | 47 | ±0 |
| Valid votes | 1,050,864 | 99.32 | +0.04 | | |
| Invalid votes | 7,146 | 0.68 | −0.04 | | |
| Votes cast / turnout | 1,058,010 | 74.85 | −3.98 | | |
| Abstentions | 286,387 | 25.15 | +3.98 | | |
| Registered voters | 1,413,503 | | | | |

Popular vote
| PSOE–p | 53.42% |
| PP | 40.40% |
| IU–ICAM | 3.41% |
| Others | 1.35% |
| Blank ballots | 1.42% |

Seats
| PSOE–p | 55.32% |
| PP | 44.68% |

=== Distribution by constituency ===
| Constituency | PSOE–p | | PP | |
| Constituency | % | S | % | S |
|---|---|---|---|---|
| Albacete | 55.8 | 6 | 37.1 | 4 |
| Ciudad Real | 54.5 | 6 | 40.0 | 5 |
| Cuenca | 50.1 | 4 | 44.5 | 4 |
| Guadalajara | 47.4 | 4 | 44.6 | 3 |
| Toledo | 54.1 | 6 | 39.9 | 5 |
| Total | 53.4 | 26 | 40.4 | 21 |

== Aftermath ==
Investiture; José Bono (PSOE)
| Ballot → | 14 July 1999 |
| Required majority → | 24 out of 47 |
| Yes: • PSOE (26) | 26 / 47 |
| No: • PP (21) | 21 / 47 |
| Abstentions | 0 / 47 |
| Absentees | 0 / 47 |
