= 1995 Castilian-Manchegan regional election =

Election in the Spanish region of Castilla–La Mancha

- 28 May 1995

All 47 seats in the Cortes of Castilla–La Mancha 24 seats needed for a majority
- Opinion polls
- Registered: 1,352,958 ▲3.7%
- Turnout: 1,066,571 (78.8%) ▲6.3 pp
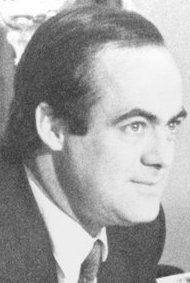

	First party	Second party	Third party
Leader	José Bono	José Manuel Molina	José Molina Martínez
Party	PSOE	PP	IU–ICAM
Leader since	25 March 1983	23 December 1989	1991
Leader's seat	Toledo	Toledo	Albacete
Last election	27 seats, 52.2%	19 seats, 35.9%	1 seat, 6.2%
Seats won	24	22	1
Seat change	▼3	▲3	0
Popular vote	483,888	469,127	80,482
Percentage	45.7%	44.3%	7.6%
Swing	▼6.5 pp	▲8.4 pp	▲1.4 pp
- Constituency results map for the Cortes of Castilla–La Mancha
President before election
José Bono
PSOE
Elected President
José Bono
PSOE

A regional election was held in Castilla–La Mancha on 28 May 1995 to elect the 4th Cortes of the autonomous community. All 47 seats in the Cortes were up for election. It was held concurrently with regional elections in twelve other autonomous communities and local elections all across Spain.

Despite bearing enormous losses, the Spanish Socialist Workers' Party (PSOE) was able to maintain government, albeit with a mere 1-seat majority. The People's Party (PP), which in this election made the greatest gains, finished a close second but remained unable to win the PSOE in one of its—considered—strongest strongholds. Meanwhile, United Left (IU) maintained its presence in the Cortes and was able to increase both its vote support and share, but remained unable to gain new seats.

== Overview ==
=== Electoral system ===
The Cortes of Castilla–La Mancha were the devolved, unicameral legislature of the autonomous community of Castilla–La Mancha, having legislative power in regional matters as defined by the Spanish Constitution and the Castilian-Manchegan Statute of Autonomy, as well as the ability to vote confidence in or withdraw it from a President of the Junta of Communities. Voting for the Cortes was on the basis of universal suffrage, which comprised all nationals over 18 years of age, registered in Castilla–La Mancha and in full enjoyment of their political rights.

The 47 members of the Cortes of Castilla–La Mancha were elected using the D'Hondt method and a closed list proportional representation, with an electoral threshold of three percent of valid votes—which included blank ballots—being applied in each constituency. Additionally, the use of the D'Hondt method might result in an effective threshold over three percent, depending on the district magnitude. Seats were allocated to constituencies, corresponding to the provinces of Albacete, Ciudad Real, Cuenca, Guadalajara and Toledo. Each constituency was entitled to an initial minimum of five seats, with the remaining 22 allocated among the constituencies in proportion to their populations.

The electoral law provided that parties, federations, coalitions and groupings of electors were allowed to present lists of candidates. However, groupings of electors were required to secure the signature of at least 1 percent of the electors registered in the constituency for which they sought election. Electors were barred from signing for more than one list of candidates. Concurrently, parties and federations intending to enter in coalition to take part jointly at an election were required to inform the relevant Electoral Commission within ten days of the election being called.

=== Election date ===
The term of the Cortes of Castilla–La Mancha expired four years after the date of their previous election. Elections to the Cortes were fixed for the fourth Sunday of May every four years. The previous election was held on 26 May 1991, setting the election date for the Cortes on 28 May 1995.

The Cortes of Castilla–La Mancha could not be dissolved before the expiration date of parliament. In the event of an investiture process failing to elect a regional President within a two-month period from the first ballot, the candidate from the party with the highest number of seats was to be deemed automatically elected.

== Opinion polls ==
The table below lists voting intention estimates in reverse chronological order, showing the most recent first and using the dates when the survey fieldwork was done, as opposed to the date of publication. Where the fieldwork dates are unknown, the date of publication is given instead. The highest percentage figure in each polling survey is displayed with its background shaded in the leading party's colour. If a tie ensues, this is applied to the figures with the highest percentages. The "Lead" column on the right shows the percentage-point difference between the parties with the highest percentages in a poll. When available, seat projections determined by the polling organisations are displayed below (or in place of) the percentages in a smaller font; 24 seats were required for an absolute majority in the Cortes of Castilla–La Mancha.

Color key:

Exit poll

Polling firm/Commissioner	Fieldwork date	Sample size	Turnout	PSOE	PP	IU	Lead
1995 regional election	28 May 1995	—N/a	78.8	45.7; 24	44.3; 22	7.6; 1	1.4
Eco Consulting/RTVE	28 May 1995	?	?	43.2; 21/22	44.2; 22/24	8.6; 2/4	1.0
Vox Pública–ODEC/Antena 3	28 May 1995	?	?	? 19/22	? 24/25	? 1/3	?
Demoscopia/El País	10–15 May 1995	1,000	?	41.9; 20/23	47.0; 23/25	8.6; 2/4	5.1
CIS	24 Apr–10 May 1995	1,696	75.1	44.2	45.3	8.7	1.1
Gruppo/ABC	24–27 Sep 1994	1,000	?	36.8; 16/19	47.8; 24/27	11.2; 4	11.0
1994 EP election	12 Jun 1994	—N/a	65.5	37.9 (18)	47.9 (25)	10.5 (4)	10.0
Gruppo/ABC	10–11 May 1994	1,000	?	39.2; 18/21	46.6; 23/25	10.6; 3/4	7.4
Sigma Dos/ABC	28–31 Jan 1994	1,000	?	42.4; 21/22	44.8; 22/23	9.2; 2/4	2.4
1993 general election	6 Jun 1993	—N/a	82.1	45.3 (24)	43.0 (22)	7.6 (1)	2.3
1991 regional election	26 May 1991	—N/a	72.5	52.2; 27	35.9; 19	6.2; 1	16.3

== Results ==
=== Overall ===
← Summary of the 28 May 1995 Cortes of Castilla–La Mancha election results →
Parties and alliances	Popular vote			Seats	
Parties and alliances	Votes	%	±pp	Total	+/−
Spanish Socialist Workers' Party (PSOE)	483,888	45.70	−6.47	24	−3
People's Party (PP)	469,127	44.30	+8.45	22	+3
United Left–Left of Castilla–La Mancha (IU–ICAM)	80,482	7.60	+1.43	1	±0
Centrist Union (UC)	4,288	0.40	−3.09	0	±0
Regionalist Party of Castilla–La Mancha (PRCM)	3,121	0.29	+0.19	0	±0
Action for Talavera Region (ACTAL)	2,015	0.19	−0.07	0	±0
The Greens–Green Group (LV–GV)	1,474	0.14	New	0	±0
Commoners' Land–Castilian Nationalist Party (TC–PNC)	1,406	0.13	+0.03	0	±0
Regionalist Party of Guadalajara (PRGU)	543	0.05	−0.03	0	±0
Guadalajara Independent Union (UIG)	513	0.05	New	0	±0
Spanish Phalanx of the CNSO (FE–JONS)	498	0.05	New	0	±0
Independent Regional Unity (URI)	391	0.04	New	0	±0
Blank ballots	11,128	1.05	+0.06		
Total	1,058,874			47	±0
Valid votes	1,058,874	99.28	+0.04		
Invalid votes	7,697	0.72	−0.04		
Votes cast / turnout	1,066,571	78.83	+6.33		
Abstentions	286,387	21.17	−6.33		
Registered voters	1,352,958				

Popular vote
PSOE	45.70%
PP	44.30%
IU–ICAM	7.60%
Others	1.35%
Blank ballots	1.05%

Seats
PSOE	51.06%
PP	46.81%
IU–ICAM	2.13%

=== Distribution by constituency ===
Constituency	PSOE		PP		IU–ICAM	
Constituency	%	S	%	S	%	S
Albacete	44.5	5	43.2	4	10.3	1
Ciudad Real	47.2	6	43.0	5	7.7	−
Cuenca	45.7	4	47.5	4	4.7	−
Guadalajara	37.9	3	48.9	4	9.6	−
Toledo	47.6	6	43.5	5	6.3	−
Total	45.7	24	44.3	22	7.6	1

== Aftermath ==
Investiture; José Bono (PSOE)
Ballot →	30 June 1995
Required majority →	24 out of 47
Yes: • PSOE (24)	24 / 47
No: • PP (22); • IU (1)	23 / 47
Abstentions	0 / 47
Absentees	0 / 47
