= 1991 Castilian-Manchegan regional election =

Election in the Spanish region of Castilla–La Mancha

- 26 May 1991

All 47 seats in the Cortes of Castilla–La Mancha 24 seats needed for a majority
- Opinion polls
- Registered: 1,304,996 ▲3.6%
- Turnout: 946,138 (72.5%) ▼2.9 pp
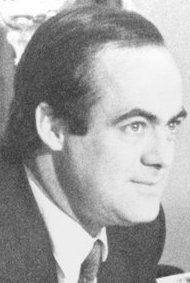

	First party	Second party	Third party
Leader	José Bono	José Manuel Molina	José Molina Martínez
Party	PSOE	PP	IU
Leader since	25 March 1983	23 December 1989	1991
Leader's seat	Toledo	Toledo	Albacete
Last election	25 seats, 46.3%	18 seats, 35.9% (Note: Results for AP (34.07%, 18 seats) and PDP (1.69%, 0 seats) in the 1987 election.)	0 seats, 5.4%
Seats won	27	19	1
Seat change	▲2	▲1	▲1
Popular vote	489,876	336,642	57,967
Percentage	52.2%	35.9%	6.2%
Swing	▲5.9 pp	0.0 pp	▲0.8 pp
- Constituency results map for the Cortes of Castilla–La Mancha
President before election
José Bono
PSOE
Elected President
José Bono
PSOE

A regional election was held in Castilla–La Mancha on 26 May 1991 to elect the 3rd Cortes of the autonomous community. All 47 seats in the Cortes were up for election. It was held concurrently with regional elections in twelve other autonomous communities and local elections all across Spain.

For the third consecutive time, the election was won by the Spanish Socialist Workers' Party, which under José Bono obtained a new absolute majority, with 27 out of 47 seats and over 52% of the share. The People's Party (PP), a party formed in 1989 from the merger of the People's Alliance (AP), the People's Democratic Party and the Liberal Party (PL), obtained 19 seats and 35.9% of the vote. United Left (IU) entered the Cortes for the first time with 1 seat.

The three parties' gains came at the cost of the Democratic and Social Centre (CDS), which lost 2/3 of its votes and its 4 seats, being expelled from the Cortes as a result.

== Overview ==
=== Electoral system ===
The Cortes of Castilla–La Mancha were the devolved, unicameral legislature of the autonomous community of Castilla–La Mancha, having legislative power in regional matters as defined by the Spanish Constitution and the Castilian-Manchegan Statute of Autonomy, as well as the ability to vote confidence in or withdraw it from a President of the Junta of Communities. Voting for the Cortes was on the basis of universal suffrage, which comprised all nationals over 18 years of age, registered in Castilla–La Mancha and in full enjoyment of their political rights.

The 47 members of the Cortes of Castilla–La Mancha were elected using the D'Hondt method and a closed list proportional representation, with an electoral threshold of three percent of valid votes—which included blank ballots—being applied in each constituency. Additionally, the use of the D'Hondt method might result in an effective threshold over three percent, depending on the district magnitude. Seats were allocated to constituencies, corresponding to the provinces of Albacete, Ciudad Real, Cuenca, Guadalajara and Toledo. Each constituency was entitled to an initial minimum of five seats, with the remaining 22 allocated among the constituencies in proportion to their populations.

The electoral law provided that parties, federations, coalitions and groupings of electors were allowed to present lists of candidates. However, groupings of electors were required to secure the signature of at least 1 percent of the electors registered in the constituency for which they sought election. Electors were barred from signing for more than one list of candidates. Concurrently, parties and federations intending to enter in coalition to take part jointly at an election were required to inform the relevant Electoral Commission within ten days of the election being called.

=== Election date ===
The term of the Cortes of Castilla–La Mancha expired four years after the date of their previous election. Legal amendments earlier in 1991 established that elections to the Cortes were to be fixed for the fourth Sunday of May every four years. The previous election was held on 10 June 1987, setting the election date for the Cortes on 26 May 1991.

The Cortes of Castilla–La Mancha could not be dissolved before the expiration date of parliament. In the event of an investiture process failing to elect a regional President within a two-month period from the first ballot, the candidate from the party with the highest number of seats was to be deemed automatically elected.

== Opinion polls ==
The table below lists voting intention estimates in reverse chronological order, showing the most recent first and using the dates when the survey fieldwork was done, as opposed to the date of publication. Where the fieldwork dates are unknown, the date of publication is given instead. The highest percentage figure in each polling survey is displayed with its background shaded in the leading party's colour. If a tie ensues, this is applied to the figures with the highest percentages. The "Lead" column on the right shows the percentage-point difference between the parties with the highest percentages in a poll. When available, seat projections determined by the polling organisations are displayed below (or in place of) the percentages in a smaller font; 24 seats were required for an absolute majority in the Cortes of Castilla–La Mancha.

Polling firm/Commissioner	Fieldwork date	Sample size	Turnout	PSOE	AP	CDS	IU	PDP	PP	Lead
1991 regional election	26 May 1991	—N/a	72.5	52.2; 27	(Note: Within PP.)	3.5; 0	6.2; 1		35.9; 19	16.3
Sigma Dos/El Mundo	18 May 1991	?	?	47.9; 25/27		5.8; 0	6.9; 0/1		35.8; 20/21	12.1
Metra Seis/El Independiente	12 May 1991	?	?	47.1; 25/26		7.0; 1	6.3; 0		35.2; 20/21	11.9
Demoscopia/El País	4–7 May 1991	750	?	51.2; 26		3.9; 0	6.2; 1/2		36.3; 19/20	14.9
1989 general election	29 Oct 1989	—N/a	76.4	48.0 (25)		7.7 (2)	7.0 (1)		33.8 (19)	14.2
1989 EP election	15 Jun 1989	—N/a	59.8	48.3 (27)		7.4 (3)	5.4 (0)		29.2 (17)	19.1
1987 regional election	10 Jun 1987	—N/a	75.4	46.3; 25	34.1; 18	10.5; 4	5.4; 0	1.7; 0	–	12.2

== Results ==
=== Overall ===
← Summary of the 26 May 1991 Cortes of Castilla–La Mancha election results →
Parties and alliances	Popular vote			Seats	
Parties and alliances	Votes	%	±pp	Total	+/−
Spanish Socialist Workers' Party (PSOE)	489,876	52.17	+5.84	27	+2
People's Party (PP)^{1}	336,642	35.85	−0.07	19	+1
United Left (IU)	57,967	6.17	+0.81	1	+1
Democratic and Social Centre (CDS)	32,793	3.49	−7.00	0	−4
The Greens Ecologist–Humanist List (LVLE–H)^{2}	4,836	0.52	+0.33	0	±0
Action for Talavera (ACTAL)	2,441	0.26	New	0	±0
Social Democratic Party of Castilla–La Mancha (PSDCLM)	1,102	0.12	−0.02	0	±0
Regionalist Unitary Party (PUR)	1,052	0.11	−0.02	0	±0
Regionalist Party of Castilla–La Mancha (PRCM)	984	0.10	New	0	±0
Commoners' Land (TC)	918	0.10	New	0	±0
Regionalist Party of Guadalajara (PRGU)	769	0.08	New	0	±0
Alliance for the Republic (AxR)	294	0.03	New	0	±0
Blank ballots	9,300	0.99	+0.01		
Total	938,974			47	±0
Valid votes	938,974	99.24	+0.40		
Invalid votes	7,164	0.76	−0.40		
Votes cast / turnout	946,138	72.50	−2.93		
Abstentions	358,858	27.50	+2.93		
Registered voters	1,304,996				
Sources
Footnotes: ^{1} People's Party results are compared to the combined totals of People's Alliance, People's Democratic Party and Liberal Party in the 1987 election.; ^{2} The Greens Ecologist–Humanist List results are compared to Humanist Platform totals in the 1987 election.

Popular vote
PSOE	52.17%
PP	35.85%
IU	6.17%
CDS	3.49%
Others	1.32%
Blank ballots	0.99%

Seats
PSOE	57.45%
PP	40.43%
IU	2.13%

=== Distribution by constituency ===
Constituency	PSOE		PP		IU	
Constituency	%	S	%	S	%	S
Albacete	54.0	6	31.5	3	8.7	1
Ciudad Real	56.4	7	31.7	4	5.6	−
Cuenca	50.3	5	39.8	3	3.3	−
Guadalajara	40.9	3	44.5	4	8.0	−
Toledo	51.3	6	38.1	5	5.8	−
Total	52.2	27	35.9	19	6.2	1

== Aftermath ==
Investiture; José Bono (PSOE)
Ballot →	3 July 1991
Required majority →	24 out of 47
Yes: • PSOE (28)	28 / 47
No: • PP (18)	18 / 47
Abstentions: • IU (1)	1 / 47
Absentees	0 / 47
