= Convento de San Gil, Toledo =

Building in Castile-La Mancha, Spain

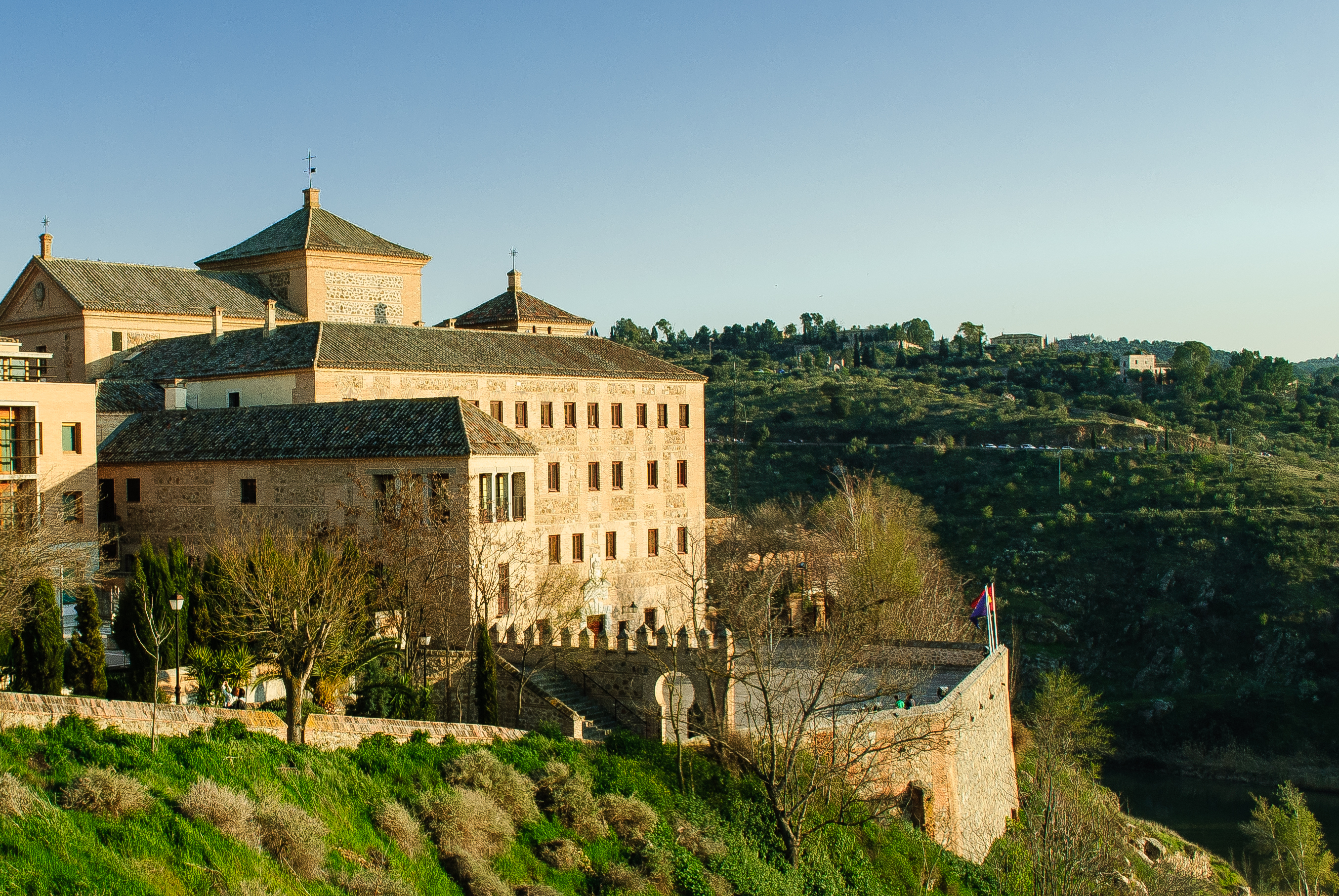
Convento de San Gil

The Covento de San Gil is a convent turned government building, located in the city of Toledo (Castile-La Mancha, Spain) dating to the 17th century. It currently houses the Cortes of Castilla-La Mancha.

The Dicalced Franciscans, or gilitos, arrived in the city in the middle of the 16th century, and established it in 1557 in the vicinity of the Ermita de la Virgen de la Rosa. Later, in the early 17th century, two brothers, Francisco and Juan de Herrera, donated to the friars 16,000 ducats for the construction of the new convent.

The works began in 1610, and the master of masonry, Martínez de Encabo, promised to complete the church and the convent in four years.

The tracer of the work was likely Juan Bautista Monegro, who, with Martínez de Encabo, worked in the iglesia de San Pedro Mártir.

The convento de los Gilitos, as it is locally known, is a notable example of the simplicity and sobriety of the Toledan architecture of the early 17th century.

The provincial prison of Toledo was installed in the building in 1863, remaining there until 1931. It then became a barracks for the Guardia Civil and then a fire station. Since 1985, the convent has been the seat of the Cortes of Castilla-La Mancha.

The building consists of two areas: the church, located on the east facade, and the convent area, which is distributed around a courtyard. All of these forms are a large rectangle.

== See also ==
- Cortes of Castilla-La Mancha
