= 1987 Castilian-Manchegan regional election =

Election in the Spanish region of Castilla–La Mancha

- 10 June 1987

All 47 seats in the Cortes of Castilla–La Mancha 24 seats needed for a majority
- Opinion polls
- Registered: 1,259,742 ▲2.4%
- Turnout: 950,262 (75.4%) ▲2.1 pp
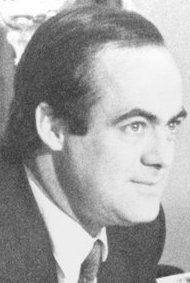

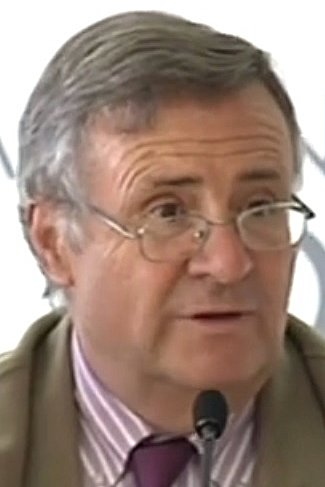

	First party	Second party	Third party
Leader	José Bono	Arturo García-Tizón	Francisco Ruiz Castillo
Party	PSOE	AP	CDS
Leader since	25 March 1983	23 June 1985	1987
Leader's seat	Toledo	Toledo	Guadalajara
Last election	23 seats, 46.7%	21 seats, 40.9% (Note: Results for AP–PDP–UL in the 1983 election.)	0 seats, 3.0%
Seats won	25	18	4
Seat change	▲2	▼3	▲4
Popular vote	435,121	319,978	98,539
Percentage	46.3%	34.1%	10.5%
Swing	▼0.4 pp	▼6.8 pp	▲7.5 pp
- Constituency results map for the Cortes of Castilla–La Mancha
President before election
José Bono
PSOE
Elected President
José Bono
PSOE

A regional election was held in Castilla–La Mancha on 10 June 1987 to elect the 2nd Cortes of the autonomous community. All 47 seats in the Cortes were up for election. It was held concurrently with regional elections in twelve other autonomous communities and local elections all across Spain, as well as the 1987 European Parliament election.

The election was won by the Spanish Socialist Workers' Party (PSOE), which gained 2 seats and enlarged its absolute majority from 52% to 53% of the seats; Castilla–La Mancha thus became one of the few autonomous communities in the 1987 regional elections where the PSOE increased its parliamentary representation. The People's Alliance (AP), on the other hand, won just 34% of the share and 18 seats, after the People's Coalition had broken up in 1986. Both former AP partners, the People's Democratic Party (PDP) and the Liberal Party (PL), stood separately but failed to attract significant support.

The Democratic and Social Centre (CDS), a party founded by former Prime Minister Adolfo Suárez, entered the Cortes for its first and only time, setting a record result for third parties in future regional elections with 4 seats and over 10% of the share. United Left (IU), an electoral coalition between the Communist Party of Spain and other left-wing parties formed in 1986, failed to gain any seats and dropped from the 6.9% it had in 1983 to 5.4%.

== Overview ==
=== Electoral system ===
The Cortes of Castilla–La Mancha were the devolved, unicameral legislature of the autonomous community of Castilla–La Mancha, having legislative power in regional matters as defined by the Spanish Constitution and the Castilian-Manchegan Statute of Autonomy, as well as the ability to vote confidence in or withdraw it from a President of the Junta of Communities. Voting for the Cortes was on the basis of universal suffrage, which comprised all nationals over 18 years of age, registered in Castilla–La Mancha and in full enjoyment of their political rights.

The 47 members of the Cortes of Castilla–La Mancha were elected using the D'Hondt method and a closed list proportional representation, with a threshold of 3 percent of valid votes (Note: The 1987 electoral law lowered the electoral threshold from five percent regionally to three percent by constituency.)—which included blank ballots—being applied in each constituency. Parties not reaching the threshold were not taken into consideration for seat distribution. Additionally, the use of the D'Hondt method might result in an effective threshold over three percent, depending on the district magnitude. Seats were allocated to constituencies, corresponding to the provinces of Albacete, Ciudad Real, Cuenca, Guadalajara and Toledo. Each constituency was entitled to an initial minimum of five seats, with the remaining 22 allocated among the constituencies in proportion to their populations.

The electoral law provided that parties, federations, coalitions and groupings of electors were allowed to present lists of candidates. However, groupings of electors were required to secure the signature of at least 1 percent of the electors registered in the constituency for which they sought election. Electors were barred from signing for more than one list of candidates. Concurrently, parties and federations intending to enter in coalition to take part jointly at an election were required to inform the relevant Electoral Commission within ten days of the election being called.

=== Election date ===
The term of the Cortes of Castilla–La Mancha expired four years after the date of their previous election. Election day was to take place between the thirtieth and the sixtieth day from the expiration date of parliament and set so as to make it coincide with elections to the regional assemblies of other autonomous communities. The previous election was held on 8 May 1983, which meant that the legislature's term would have expired on 8 May 1987. The election was required to take place no later than the sixtieth day from the expiration date of parliament, setting the latest possible election date for the Cortes on 7 July 1987.

The Cortes of Castilla–La Mancha could not be dissolved before the expiration date of parliament. In the event of an investiture process failing to elect a regional President within a two-month period from the first ballot, the candidate from the party with the highest number of seats was to be deemed automatically elected.

== Opinion polls ==
The table below lists voting intention estimates in reverse chronological order, showing the most recent first and using the dates when the survey fieldwork was done, as opposed to the date of publication. Where the fieldwork dates are unknown, the date of publication is given instead. The highest percentage figure in each polling survey is displayed with its background shaded in the leading party's colour. If a tie ensues, this is applied to the figures with the highest percentages. The "Lead" column on the right shows the percentage-point difference between the parties with the highest percentages in a poll. When available, seat projections determined by the polling organisations are displayed below (or in place of) the percentages in a smaller font; 24 seats were required for an absolute majority in the Cortes of Castilla–La Mancha (23 until 23 December 1986).

Polling firm/Commissioner	Fieldwork date	Sample size	Turnout	PSOE	AP–PDP–PL	IU	CDS	AP	PDP	Lead
1987 regional election	10 Jun 1987	—N/a	75.4	46.3; 25	–	5.4; 0	10.5; 4	34.1; 18	1.7; 0	12.2
Demoscopia/El País	22–26 May 1987	?	69	42.6; 21/22	–	6.4; 1/3	11.7; 4/7	35.0; 16/18	2.8; 1	7.6
Typol/AP	20 May 1987	?	?	? 23/25	–	–	? 2/3	? 19/21	–	?
CDS	13 May 1987	?	?	? 19	–	? 1	? 12/13	? 14/15	? 0/1	?
Sofemasa/AP	16 Apr 1987	?	?	40.0	–	–	8.0	35.0	–	5.0
1986 general election	22 Jun 1986	—N/a	75.1	47.8 (23)	34.8 (17)	4.1 (0)	9.7 (4)	(Note: Within CP.)		13.0
1983 regional election	8 May 1983	—N/a	73.3	46.7; 23	40.9; 21	6.9 (Note: Result for PCE.); 0	3.0; 0			5.8

== Results ==
=== Overall ===
← Summary of the 10 June 1987 Cortes of Castilla–La Mancha election results →
Parties and alliances	Popular vote			Seats	
Parties and alliances	Votes	%	±pp	Total	+/−
Spanish Socialist Workers' Party (PSOE)	435,121	46.33	−0.37	25	+2
People's Alliance (AP)^{1}	319,978	34.07	−6.85	18	−3
Democratic and Social Centre (CDS)	98,539	10.49	+7.47	4	+4
United Left (IU)^{2}	50,366	5.36	−1.50	0	±0
People's Democratic Party (PDP)	15,863	1.69	New	0	±0
Workers' Party of Spain–Communist Unity (PTE–UC)	3,871	0.41	New	0	±0
Humanist Platform (PH)	1,778	0.19	New	0	±0
Liberal Party (PL)	1,459	0.16	New	0	±0
Social Democratic Party of Castilla–La Mancha (PSDCLM)	1,317	0.14	New	0	±0
Regionalist Unitary Party (PUR)	1,183	0.13	New	0	±0
Manchegan Regionalist Party (PRM)	487	0.05	New	0	±0
Blank ballots	9,247	0.98	+0.33		
Total	939,209			47	+3
Valid votes	939,209	98.84	+0.02		
Invalid votes	11,053	1.16	−0.02		
Votes cast / turnout	950,262	75.43	+2.11		
Abstentions	309,480	26.68	−2.11		
Registered voters	1,259,742				
Sources
Footnotes: ^{1} People's Alliance results are compared to People's Coalition totals in the 1983 election.; ^{2} United Left results are compared to Communist Party of Spain totals in the 1983 election.

Popular vote
PSOE	46.33%
AP	34.07%
CDS	10.49%
IU	5.36%
PDP	1.69%
Others	1.51%
Blank ballots	0.98%

Seats
PSOE	53.19%
AP	38.30%
CDS	8.51%

=== Distribution by constituency ===
Constituency	PSOE		AP		CDS	
Constituency	%	S	%	S	%	S
Albacete	48.5	6	30.6	3	10.8	1
Ciudad Real	50.1	6	28.9	4	11.5	1
Cuenca	44.1	4	38.1	4	8.7	−
Guadalajara	37.8	3	41.7	3	10.5	1
Toledo	45.1	6	36.8	4	10.2	1
Total	46.3	25	34.1	18	10.5	4

== Aftermath ==
Investiture; José Bono (PSOE)
Ballot →	14 July 1987
Required majority →	24 out of 47
Yes: • PSOE (25)	25 / 47
No: • AP (17)	17 / 47
Abstentions: • CDS (4)	4 / 47
Absentees: • AP (17)	1 / 47
