= Ganemos Castilla–La Mancha =

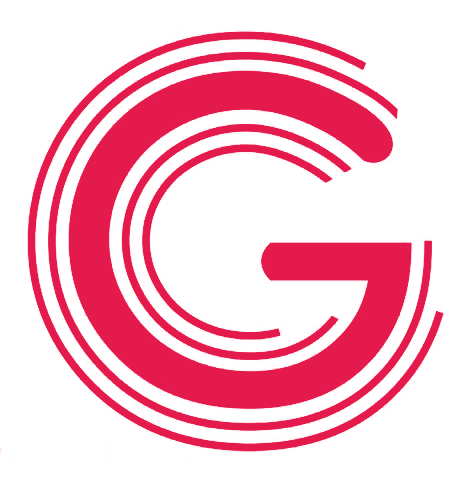
- Founded: 8 November 2014
- Dissolved: 2015
- Merger of: IUCLM; LV
- Political position: Left-wing

Ganemos Castilla–La Mancha (Spanish for Let's Win Castilla–La Mancha, Ganemos CLM) was a political platform formed on 8 November 2014 by members from several left-wing parties, organizations and neighborhood and social platforms with the purpose of forming a left-wing electoral coalition ahead of the 2015 Castilian-Manchegan regional election. The platform invited United Left, Podemos, Equo, For a Fairer World and Animalist Party Against Mistreatment of Animals as well as several other parties into the alliance, but in the end only United Left and The Greens joined it.

== Member parties ==
- United Left of Castilla–La Mancha (IUCLM)
- The Greens (LV)

== Electoral performance ==
=== Cortes of Castilla–La Mancha ===
Date	Votes			Seats		Status	Size
Date	#	%	±pp	#	±	Status	Size
2015	34,230	3.1%	–0.7	0 / 45	0	N/A	5th
