= The Greens of Europe (Spain) =

The Greens of Europe Los Verdes de Europa
- Leader: David Hammerstein
- Founded: 2005
- Split from: Confederation of the Greens
- Ideology: Green politics Ecologism

Website
- verdes-villena.org

The Greens of Europe (Spanish: Los Verdes de Europa; LVdeE) is a green political party in Spain founded in 2005 as a split from the Confederation of the Greens.

The party has been the ruling party of the Spanish municipality of Villena since 2011, winning an absolute majority in the 2015 Spanish local elections.
