= Socialist Party of Castilla–La Mancha =

Socialist Party of Castilla–La Mancha Partido Socialista de Castilla–La Mancha
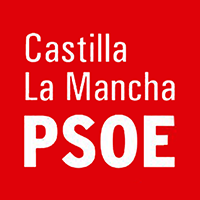
- President: Matilde Valentín
- Secretary-General: Emiliano García-Page
- Founded: 1988
- Headquarters: Santa María La Blanca 2, 2º 45002 Toledo
- Membership (2017): 12,190
- Ideology: Social democracy
- Political position: Centre-left
- National affiliation: Spanish Socialist Workers' Party
- Congress of Deputies: 8 / 21 (Castilla–La Mancha seats)
- Spanish Senate: 12 / 23 (Castilla–La Mancha seats)
- Cortes of Castilla–La Mancha: 17 / 33
- Provincial deputations: 59 / 129
- Local seats: 2,859 / 6,485

Website
- pscm-psoe.com

The Socialist Party of Castilla–La Mancha (Spanish: Partido Socialista de Castilla–La Mancha, PSCM-PSOE) is the regional branch in Castilla–La Mancha of the Spanish Socialist Workers' Party (PSOE), the main centre-left party in Spain since the 1970s.

== Electoral performance ==
=== Cortes of Castilla–La Mancha ===
Cortes of Castilla–La Mancha
Election	Votes	%	#	Seats	+/–	Leading candidate	Status in legislature
1983	416,177	46.70%	1st	23 / 44	—	José Bono	Government
1987	435,121	46.33%	1st	25 / 47	2	José Bono	Government
1991	489,876	52.17%	1st	27 / 47	2	José Bono	Government
1995	483,888	45.70%	1st	24 / 47	3	José Bono	Government
1999	561,332	53.42%	1st	26 / 47	2	José Bono	Government
2003	634,132	57.83%	1st	29 / 47	3	José Bono	Government
2007	572,849	51.96%	1st	26 / 47	3	José María Barreda	Government
2011	509,738	43.40%	2nd	24 / 49	2	José María Barreda	Opposition
2015	398,104	36.11%	2nd	15 / 33	9	Emiliano García-Page	Government (2015–2017)
2015	398,104	36.11%	2nd	15 / 33	9	Emiliano García-Page	Coalition (2017–2019)
2019	476,469	44.10%	1st	19 / 33	4	Emiliano García-Page	Government
2023	490,288	45.04%	1st	17 / 33	2	Emiliano García-Page	Government

=== Cortes Generales ===
Cortes Generales
Election	Castilla–La Mancha						
Election	Congress					Senate	
Election	Votes	%	#	Seats	+/–	Seats	+/–
1977	265,486	29.81%	2nd	8 / 21	—	7 / 20	—
1979	303,558	34.54%	2nd	8 / 21	0	7 / 20	0
1982	486,553	49.21%	1st	13 / 21	5	15 / 20	8
1986	457,573	47.79%	1st	12 / 20	1	13 / 20	2
1989	466,964	47.96%	1st	12 / 20	0	13 / 20	0
1993	487,810	45.30%	1st	10 / 20	2	11 / 20	2
1996	483,251	42.62%	2nd	9 / 20	1	7 / 20	4
2000	438,630	40.78%	2nd	8 / 20	1	5 / 20	2
2004	537,405	46.50%	2nd	9 / 20	1	8 / 20	3
2008	538,402	44.51%	2nd	9 / 21	0	6 / 20	2
2011	355,806	30.34%	2nd	7 / 21	2	5 / 20	1
2015	331,856	28.36%	2nd	7 / 21	0	5 / 20	0
2016	303,786	27.28%	2nd	7 / 21	0	5 / 20	0
2019 (Apr)	384,461	32.38%	1st	9 / 21	2	15 / 20	10
2019 (Nov)	360,013	33.10%	1st	9 / 21	0	11 / 20	4

=== European Parliament ===
European Parliament
Election	Castilla–La Mancha		
Election	Votes	%	#
1987	418,182	44.66%	1st
1989	364,506	48.28%	1st
1994	329,979	37.89%	2nd
1999	476,280	45.45%	2nd
2004	343,937	45.81%	2nd
2009	316,538	39.93%	2nd
2014	205,473	28.76%	2nd
2019	434,292	40.46%	1st
2024	254,071	31.70%	2nd
