= Cortes of Castilla–La Mancha =

Unicameral legislature of Castilla–La Mancha

Coordinates: 39.85387°N 4.02862°W

Cortes of Castilla–La Mancha Cortes de Castilla-La Mancha
- Castile–La Mancha unicameral legislature

Type
- Type: Spanish regional legislature
- Houses: Unicameral

Leadership
- President: Pablo Bellido

Structure
- Seats: 33
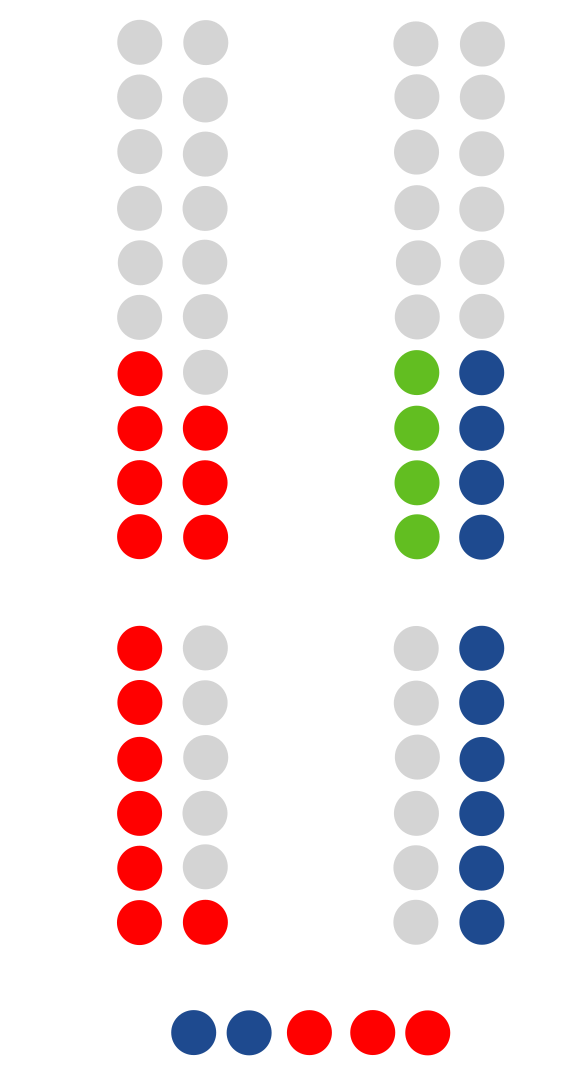
- Political groups: Government (17): PSOE (17); Opposition (16): PP (12); Vox (4)
- Length of term: 4 years

Elections
- Last election: 28 May 2023

Meeting place
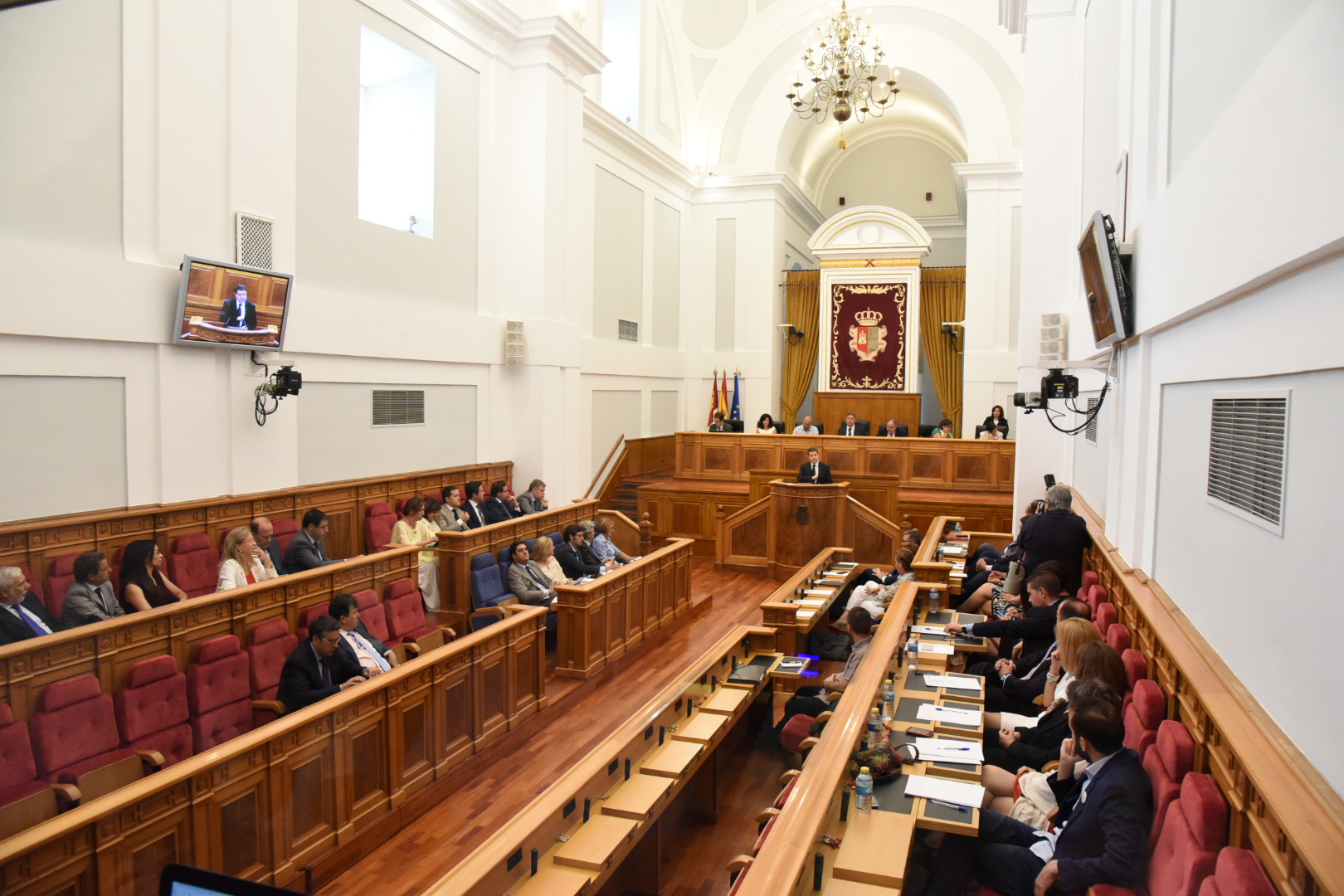
- The chamber of the Cortes of Castile–La Mancha; Toledo, Castile–La Mancha

Website
- Cortes de Castilla–La Mancha

The Cortes of Castilla–La Mancha (Spanish: Cortes de Castilla-La Mancha) is the unicameral legislature of Castilla–La Mancha, an autonomous community of Spain. The Cortes consists of 33 elected deputies. The Cortes of Castilla–La Mancha represent the popular will through 33 deputies elected by universal adult suffrage through the secret ballot.

== Electoral system ==
Deputies are elected for a term of four years under a proportional system intended to guarantee representation to the various territorial zones of Castile–La Mancha. The electoral constituency is at the level of each province, with provinces being assigned the following number of deputies as of 2015: Albacete, 6; Ciudad Real, 8; Cuenca, 5; Guadalajara, 5; and Toledo, 9.

Article 10 of the Statute of Autonomy states that elections will be convoked by the President of the Junta of Communities, following the General Electoral Regime (Régimen Electoral General), on the fourth Sunday in May every four years. This stands in contrast to the autonomous communities of the Basque Country, Catalonia, Galicia, Andalusia and the Valencian Community where the president has the power to call elections at any time.

== Composition ==
Since the 28 May 2023 election, the Cortes of Castile–La Mancha has consisted of 12 deputies from the conservative People's Party, 17 from the social-democratic PSOE and 4 from the far-right Vox. The Cortes sits in the former Franciscan convent in Toledo, the Convento de San Gil.

=== Results of the elections to the Cortes of Castilla–La Mancha ===
Deputies in Regional Cortes of Castilla–La Mancha since 1983
Key to parties Podemos IU PSOE Cs CDS PP CP AP Vox
Election	Distribution	President
1983	23 / 21	José Bono (PSOE)
1987	25 / 4 / 18	José Bono (PSOE)
1991	1 / 27 / 19	José Bono (PSOE)
1995	1 / 24 / 22	José Bono (PSOE)
1999	26 / 21	José Bono (PSOE)
2003	29 / 18	José Bono (PSOE) (2003-2004)
2003	29 / 18	José María Barreda (PSOE) (2004-2007)
2007	26 / 21	José María Barreda (PSOE)
2011	24 / 25	María Dolores de Cospedal (PP)
2015	2 / 15 / 16	Emiliano García-Page (PSOE)
2019	19 / 4 / 10	Emiliano García-Page (PSOE)
2023	17 / 12 / 4	Emiliano García-Page (PSOE)

== List of presidents of the Cortes of Castilla–La Mancha ==
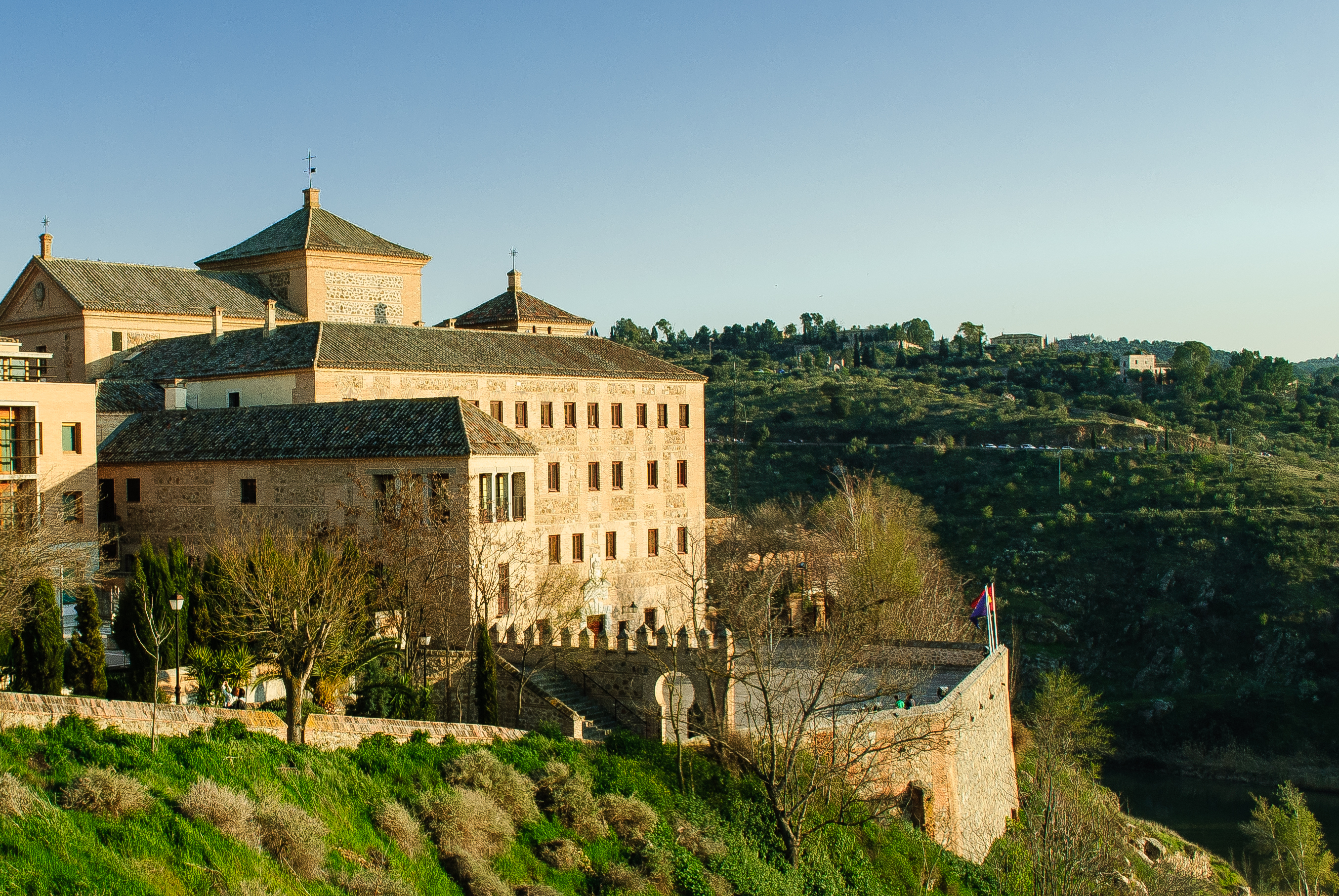
The meeting place of the Cortes of Castilla-La Mancha

- I Legislatura: Francisco Javier de Irízar Ortega (1983–1987)
- II Legislatura: José Manuel Martínez Cenzano (1987–1991)
- III Legislatura: José María Barreda (1991–1995)
- IV Legislatura: José María Barreda (1995–1997)
- IV Legislatura: María Carmen Blázquez Martínez (1997–1999)
- V Legislatura: Antonio Marco Martínez (1999–2003)
- VI Legislatura: Fernando López Carrasco (2003–2007)
- VII Legislatura: Francisco Pardo Piqueras (2007–2011)
- VIII Legislatura: Vicente Tirado Ochoa (2011–2015)
- IX Legislatura: Jesús Fernández Vaquero (2015-2019)
- X Legislatura: Pablo Bellido (2019–2023)
- XI Legislatura: Pablo Bellido (2023–present)
