= People's Party of Castilla–La Mancha =

People's Party of Castilla–La Mancha Partido Popular de Castilla–La Mancha
- President: Francisco Núñez
- Secretary-General: Carolina Agudo
- Founded: 1989
- Headquarters: Ronda Buenavista, 14; Toledo, Spain
- Ideology: Christian democracy Spanish nationalism Conservatism; Economic liberalism
- Political position: Centre-right
- National affiliation: People's Party
- Cortes of Castilla–La Mancha: 12 / 33
- Congress of Deputies (Castilian-Manchegan seats): 10 / 21
- Senate (Castilian-Manchegan seats): 6 / 23

Website
- ppclm.es

The People's Party of Castilla–La Mancha (Spanish: Partido Popular de Castilla–La Mancha, PP) is the regional section of the People's Party of Spain (PP) in Castilla–La Mancha. It was formed in 1989 from the re-foundation of the People's Alliance.
