= 2019 Castilian-Manchegan regional election =

Election in the Spanish region of Castilla–La Mancha

- 26 May 2019

All 33 seats in the Cortes of Castilla–La Mancha 17 seats needed for a majority
- Opinion polls
- Registered: 1,572,308 ▼0.3%
- Turnout: 1,091,900 (69.4%) ▼2.1 pp
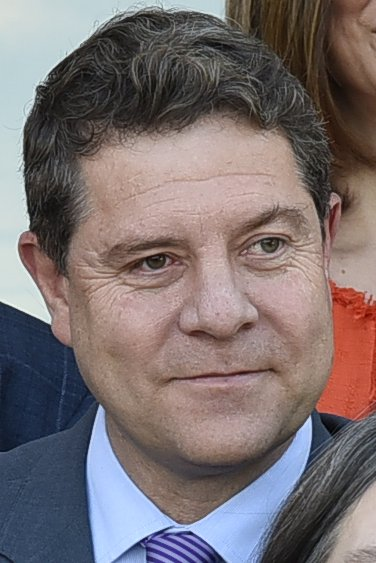

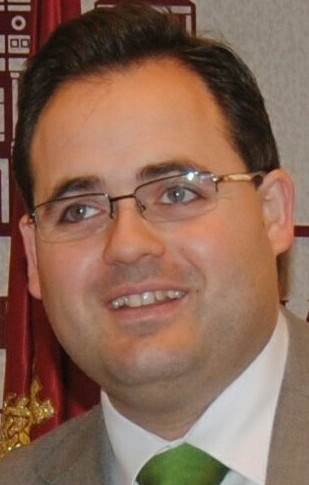

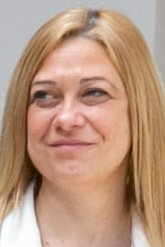
	First party	Second party	Third party
Leader	Emiliano García-Page	Francisco Núñez	Carmen Picazo
Party	PSOE	PP	Cs
Leader since	26 February 2012	7 October 2018	9 March 2019
Leader's seat	Toledo	Albacete	Albacete
Last election	15 seats, 36.1%	16 seats, 37.5%	0 seats, 8.6%
Seats won	19	10	4
Seat change	▲4	▼6	▲4
Popular vote	476,469	308,184	122,955
Percentage	44.1%	28.5%	11.4%
Swing	▲8.0 pp	▼9.0 pp	▲2.9 pp
- Constituency results map for the Cortes of Castilla–La Mancha
President before election
Emiliano García-Page
PSOE
Elected President
Emiliano García-Page
PSOE

A regional election was held in Castilla–La Mancha on 26 May 2019 to elect the 10th Cortes of the autonomous community. All 33 seats in the Cortes were up for election. It was held concurrently with regional elections in eleven other autonomous communities and local elections all across Spain, as well as the 2019 European Parliament election.

== Overview ==
=== Electoral system ===
The Cortes of Castilla–La Mancha were the devolved, unicameral legislature of the autonomous community of Castilla–La Mancha, having legislative power in regional matters as defined by the Spanish Constitution and the Castilian-Manchegan Statute of Autonomy, as well as the ability to vote confidence in or withdraw it from a regional president. Voting for the Cortes was on the basis of universal suffrage, which comprised all nationals over 18 years of age, registered in Castilla–La Mancha and in full enjoyment of their political rights. Additionally, Castilian-Manchegan people abroad were required to apply for voting before being permitted to vote, a system known as "begged" or expat vote (Spanish: Voto rogado).

The 33 members of the Cortes of Castilla–La Mancha were elected using the D'Hondt method and a closed list proportional representation, with an electoral threshold of three percent of valid votes—which included blank ballots—being applied in each constituency. Seats were allocated to constituencies, corresponding to the provinces of Albacete, Ciudad Real, Cuenca, Guadalajara and Toledo, with each being allocated an initial minimum of three seats and the remaining 18 being distributed in proportion to their populations.

As a result of the aforementioned allocation, each Cortes constituency was entitled the following seats:

Seats	Constituencies
9	Toledo
7	Albacete, Ciudad Real
5	Cuenca, Guadalajara

In smaller constituencies, the use of the electoral method resulted in an effective threshold based on the district magnitude and the distribution of votes among candidacies.

=== Election date ===
The term of the Cortes of Castilla–La Mancha expired four years after the date of their previous election. Elections to the Cortes were fixed for the fourth Sunday of May every four years. The previous election was held on 24 May 2015, setting the election date for the Cortes on 26 May 2019.

The president had the prerogative to dissolve the Cortes of Castilla–La Mancha and call a snap election, provided that no motion of no confidence was in process, no nationwide election was due and some time requirements were met: namely, that dissolution did not occur either during the first legislative session or within the legislature's last year ahead of its scheduled expiry, nor before one year had elapsed since a previous dissolution. Any snap election held as a result of these circumstances would not alter the period to the next ordinary election, with elected lawmakers serving the remainder of its original four-year term. In the event of an investiture process failing to elect a regional president within a two-month period from the first ballot, the candidate from the party with the highest number of seats was to be deemed automatically elected.

The election to the Cortes of Castilla–La Mancha were officially triggered on 2 April 2019 after the publication of the election decree in the Official Journal of Castilla–La Mancha (DOCM), scheduling for the chamber to convene on 19 June.

== Parliamentary composition ==
The tables below show the composition of the parliamentary groups in the Cortes at the time of dissolution.

Parliamentary composition in April 2019
Groups	Parties	Legislators	
Groups	Parties	Seats	Total
People's Parliamentary Group	PP	16	16
Socialist Parliamentary Group	PSOE	15	15
We Can Parliamentary Group	Podemos	2	2

== Parties and candidates ==
The electoral law allowed for parties and federations registered in the interior ministry, coalitions and groupings of electors to present lists of candidates. Parties and federations intending to form a coalition ahead of an election were required to inform the relevant Electoral Commission within ten days of the election call, whereas groupings of electors needed to secure the signature of at least one percent of the electorate in the constituencies for which they sought election, disallowing electors from signing for more than one list of candidates.

Below is a list of the main parties and electoral alliances which contested the election:

Candidacy	Parties and alliances	Leading candidate	Ideology	Previous result		Gov.	Ref.
Candidacy	Parties and alliances	Leading candidate	Ideology	Vote %	Seats	Gov.	Ref.
PP	List: People's Party (PP)	Francisco Núñez	Conservatism; Christian democracy	37.5%	16	No	
PSOE	List: Spanish Socialist Workers' Party (PSOE)	Emiliano García-Page	Social democracy	36.1%	15	Yes	
Podemos– IU–Equo	List: We Can (Podemos); United Left of Castilla–La Mancha (IUCLM) – Communist Party of Castilla–La Mancha (PCE–CLM) – The Dawn Marxist Organization (La Aurora (OM)) – Republican Left (IR) – Feminist Party of Spain (PFE); Equo (Equo)	José García Molina	Left-wing populism Direct democracy Democratic socialism	12.9% (Note: Results for Podemos (9.7%, 2 seats) and Let's Win Castilla–La Mancha–The Greens–United Left (3.1%, 0 seats) in the 2015 election.)	2	Yes	
Cs	List: Citizens–Party of the Citizenry (Cs)	Carmen Picazo	Liberalism	8.6%	0	No	
Vox	List: Vox (Vox)	Daniel Arias Vegas	Right-wing populism Ultranationalism; National conservatism	0.5%	0	No	

== Campaign ==
=== Debates ===
2019 Castilian-Manchegan regional election debates
Date	Organizer(s)	Moderator(s)	P Present (Note: Denotes a main invitee attending the event.)						
Date	Organizer(s)	Moderator(s)	PP	PSOE	UP	Cs	Vox	Audience	Ref.
20 May	CMM	Sonia Trigueros	P Núñez	P Page	P Molina	P Picazo	P Arias	9.2% (68,000)	

== Opinion polls ==
The table below lists voting intention estimates in reverse chronological order, showing the most recent first and using the dates when the survey fieldwork was done, as opposed to the date of publication. Where the fieldwork dates are unknown, the date of publication is given instead. The highest percentage figure in each polling survey is displayed with its background shaded in the leading party's colour. If a tie ensues, this is applied to the figures with the highest percentages. The "Lead" column on the right shows the percentage-point difference between the parties with the highest percentages in a poll. When available, seat projections determined by the polling organisations are displayed below (or in place of) the percentages in a smaller font; 17 seats were required for an absolute majority in the Cortes of Castilla–La Mancha.

Color key:

Poll conducted after legal ban on opinion polls Exit poll

Polling firm/Commissioner	Fieldwork date	Sample size	Turnout	PP	PSOE	Podemos	Cs	IU	Vox	Unidas Podemos	Lead
2019 regional election	26 May 2019	—N/a	69.4	28.5; 10	44.1; 19	(Note: Within Unidas Podemos.)	11.4; 4		7.0; 0	6.9; 0	15.6
GfK/FORTA	26 May 2019	26,000	?	26.6; 8/10	43.1; 16/18		10.4; 3/4		7.7; 0/1	10.0; 2/3	16.5
ElectoPanel/Electomanía	22–23 May 2019	?	?	27.3; 11	35.6; 15		15.4; 5		8.7; 1	9.5; 1	8.3
ElectoPanel/Electomanía	21–22 May 2019	?	?	27.8; 11	35.7; 15		15.1; 5		8.6; 1	9.4; 1	7.9
ElectoPanel/Electomanía	20–21 May 2019	?	?	27.6; 11	35.4; 15		15.2; 5		8.9; 1	9.6; 1	7.8
ElectoPanel/Electomanía	19–20 May 2019	?	?	27.7; 11	35.1; 15		15.6; 5		8.7; 1	9.7; 1	7.4
NC Report/La Razón	19 May 2019	?	?	28.1; 11/12	38.4; 15/16		? 3/4		? 1/2	? 1/2	10.3
ElectoPanel/Electomanía	16–19 May 2019	?	?	27.7; 11	35.0; 15		15.0; 5		8.9; 1	9.6; 1	7.3
ElectoPanel/Electomanía	13–16 May 2019	?	?	26.9; 11	33.7; 12		17.5; 7		9.1; 2	9.5; 1	6.8
ElectoPanel/Electomanía	10–13 May 2019	?	?	25.6; 11	31.6; 12		19.8; 7		10.0; 2	9.9; 1	6.0
ElectoPanel/Electomanía	7–10 May 2019	?	?	24.5; 11	31.0; 12		20.6; 7		10.6; 2	10.2; 1	6.5
Numeral8	6–9 May 2019	2,000	?	27.1; 10/11	38.8; 15/17		13.3; 3/4		8.7; 1/2	9.0; 1/2	11.7
ElectoPanel/Electomanía	4–7 May 2019	?	?	23.9; 11	31.0; 12		20.8; 7		10.9; 2	10.1; 1	7.1
ElectoPanel/Electomanía	29 Apr–4 May 2019	?	?	23.6; 9	30.7; 12		20.9; 7		11.0; 4	10.2; 1	7.1
April 2019 general election	28 Apr 2019	—N/a	76.6	22.7 (8)	32.4 (13)		17.5 (6)		15.3 (5)	10.2 (1)	10.7
CIS	21 Mar–23 Apr 2019	1,088	?	29.8; 11/14	40.3; 15/18		8.6; 2/3		6.8; 0/1	10.9; 2/3	10.5
ElectoPanel/Electomanía	31 Mar–7 Apr 2019	?	?	27.0; 11	34.8; 13		11.8; 2		12.3; 5	9.9; 2	7.8
ElectoPanel/Electomanía	24–31 Mar 2019	?	?	26.2; 10	35.0; 13		12.2; 4		12.4; 5	9.8; 1	8.8
ElectoPanel/Electomanía	17–24 Mar 2019	?	?	26.5; 10	36.0; 14		12.0; 4		12.0; 4	9.5; 1	9.5
ElectoPanel/Electomanía	10–17 Mar 2019	?	?	26.6; 10	34.4; 13		11.1; 3		14.4; 5	9.7; 2	7.8
ElectoPanel/Electomanía	3–10 Mar 2019	?	?	26.1; 10	33.9; 13		11.7; 3		14.3; 5	9.9; 2	7.8
ElectoPanel/Electomanía	22 Feb–3 Mar 2019	?	?	26.3; 10	33.7; 13		11.8; 3		14.0; 5	9.9; 2	7.4
SW Demoscopia/PSOE	8 Jan 2019	2,000	?	26.3; 10/11	40.3; 16/17		16.3; 4/5		8.5; 0/1	8.6; 1/2	14.0
NC Report/La Razón	14–18 May 2018	1,400	68.9	33.3; 13/14	32.9; 13/14	9.9; 2	15.0; 4/5	4.2; 0	–	–	0.4
SyM Consulting	21–24 Mar 2018	3,200	73.5	32.2; 11/14	35.0; 13/17	9.5; 1/2	14.3; 3/4	3.4; 0	–	–	2.8
Celeste-Tel/PSOE	1–22 Mar 2018	1,950	?	28.6; 11	37.2; 14/17	9.0; 1/3	16.8; 4/6	–	–	–	8.6
Noxa/PSOE	22–26 May 2017	1,000	?	34.3	37.9	9.0	12.5	2.2	–	–	3.6
2016 general election	26 Jun 2016	—N/a	71.8	42.7 (16)	27.3 (9)		13.0 (4)		0.2 (0)	14.7 (4)	15.4
2015 general election	20 Dec 2015	—N/a	75.3	38.1 (14)	28.4 (11)	13.7 (4)	13.8 (4)	3.6 (0)	0.3 (0)	–	9.7
2015 regional election	24 May 2015	—N/a	71.5	37.5; 16	36.1; 15	9.7; 2	8.6; 0	3.1; 0	0.5; 0	–	1.4

== Results ==
=== Overall ===
← Summary of the 26 May 2019 Cortes of Castilla–La Mancha election results →
Parties and alliances	Popular vote			Seats	
Parties and alliances	Votes	%	±pp	Total	+/−
Spanish Socialist Workers' Party (PSOE)	476,469	44.10	+7.99	19	+4
People's Party (PP)	308,184	28.53	−8.96	10	−6
Citizens–Party of the Citizenry (Cs)	122,955	11.38	+2.74	4	+4
Vox (Vox)	75,813	7.02	+6.54	0	±0
United We Can–United Left–Equo CLM (Podemos–IU–Equo)^{1}	74,777	6.92	−5.93	0	−2
Animalist Party Against Mistreatment of Animals (PACMA)	8,662	0.80	−0.01	0	±0
Castilian Party–Commoners' Land (PCAS–TC)	1,411	0.13	−0.01	0	±0
Communist Party of the Peoples of Spain (PCPE)	1,248	0.12	+0.03	0	±0
Traditions and Rural World (ANATUR–UDEC)	1,244	0.12	New	0	±0
For a Fairer World (PUM+J)	728	0.07	New	0	±0
Together We Win (JG)	149	0.01	New	0	±0
Blank ballots	8,754	0.81	−0.94		
Total	1,080,394			33	±0
Valid votes	1,080,394	98.95	+1.13		
Invalid votes	11,506	1.05	−1.13		
Votes cast / turnout	1,091,900	69.45	−2.05		
Abstentions	480,408	30.55	+2.05		
Registered voters	1,572,308				
Sources
Footnotes: ^{1} United We Can–United Left–Equo CLM results are compared to the combined totals of We Can and Let's Win Castilla–La Mancha–The Greens–United Left in the 2015 election.

Popular vote
PSOE	44.10%
PP	28.53%
Cs	11.38%
Vox	7.02%
Unidas Podemos	6.92%
Others	1.24%
Blank ballots	0.81%

Seats
PSOE	57.58%
PP	30.30%
Cs	12.12%

=== Distribution by constituency ===
Constituency	PSOE		PP		Cs	
Constituency	%	S	%	S	%	S
Albacete	41.9	4	29.1	2	13.2	1
Ciudad Real	46.3	4	28.6	2	11.3	1
Cuenca	46.4	3	32.8	2	7.9	−
Guadalajara	39.6	3	24.3	1	14.4	1
Toledo	44.6	5	28.3	3	10.5	1
Total	44.1	19	28.5	10	11.4	4

== Aftermath ==
Investiture; Emiliano García-Page (PSOE)
Ballot →	3 July 2019
Required majority →	17 out of 33
Yes: • PSOE (19)	19 / 33
No: • PP (10); • Cs (4)	14 / 33
Abstentions	0 / 33
Absentees	0 / 33
