= 2015 Castilian-Manchegan regional election =

Election in the Spanish region of Castilla–La Mancha

- 24 May 2015

All 33 seats in the Cortes of Castilla–La Mancha 17 seats needed for a majority
- Opinion polls
- Registered: 1,576,351 ▲0.6%
- Turnout: 1,127,147 (71.5%) ▼4.5 pp
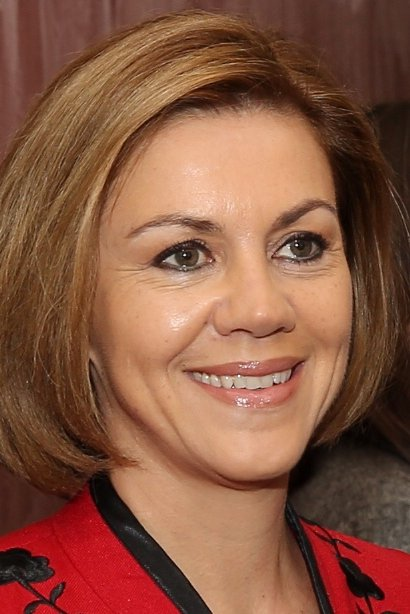

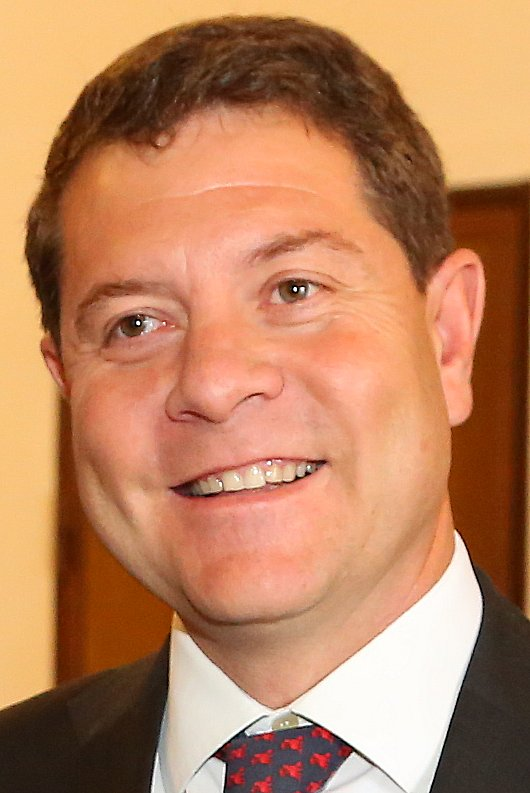

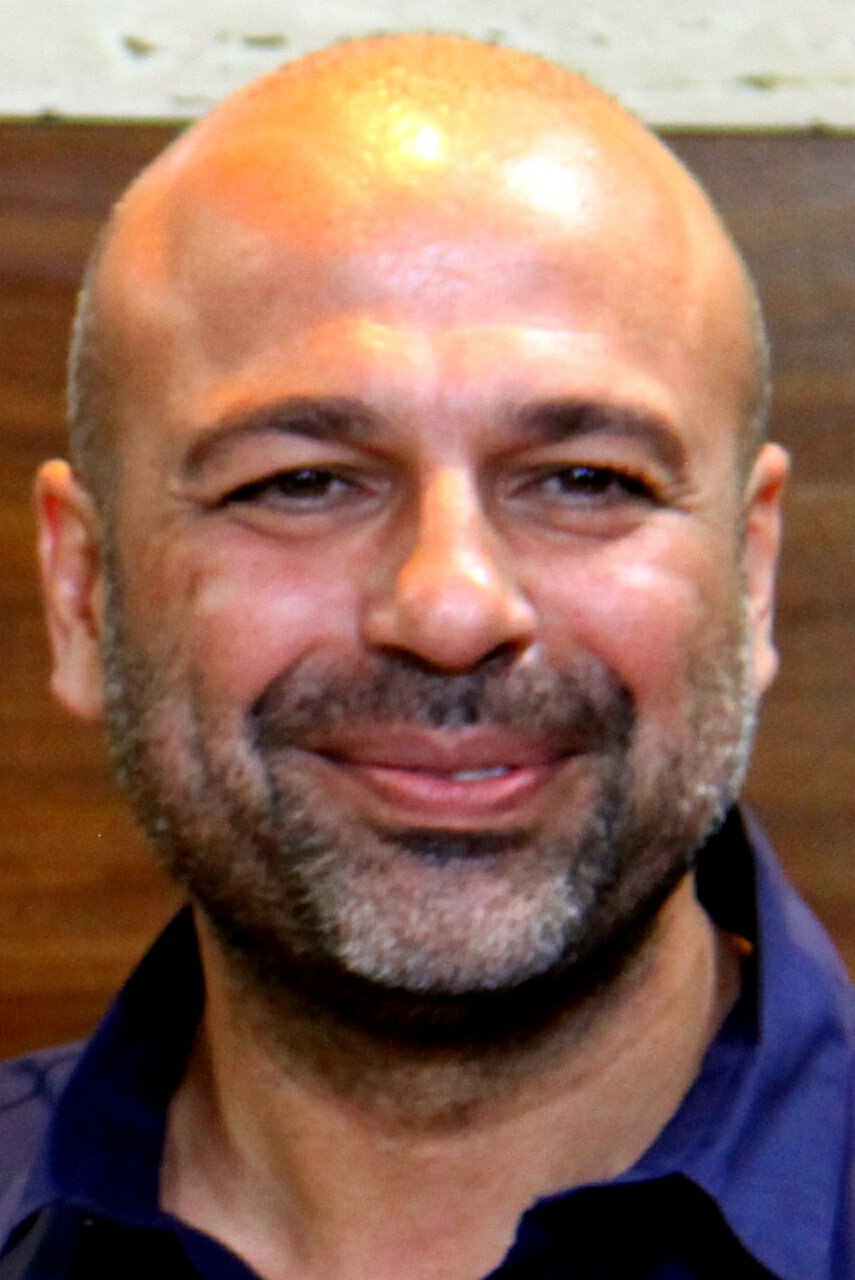
	First party	Second party	Third party
Leader	María Dolores de Cospedal	Emiliano García-Page	José García Molina
Party	PP	PSOE	Podemos
Leader since	14 June 2006	26 February 2012	1 April 2015
Leader's seat	Toledo	Toledo	Toledo
Last election	25 seats, 48.1%	24 seats, 43.4%	Did not contest
Seats won	16	15	2
Seat change	▼9	▼9	▲2
Popular vote	413,349	398,104	107,463
Percentage	37.5%	36.1%	9.7%
Swing	▼10.6 pp	▼7.3 pp	New party
- Constituency results map for the Cortes of Castilla–La Mancha
President before election
María Dolores de Cospedal
PP
Elected President
Emiliano García-Page
PSOE

A regional election was held in Castilla–La Mancha on 24 May 2015 to elect the 9th Cortes of the autonomous community. All 33 seats in the Cortes were up for election. It was held concurrently with regional elections in twelve other autonomous communities and local elections all across Spain.

== Overview ==
=== Electoral system ===
The Cortes of Castilla–La Mancha were the devolved, unicameral legislature of the autonomous community of Castilla–La Mancha, having legislative power in regional matters as defined by the Spanish Constitution and the Castilian-Manchegan Statute of Autonomy, as well as the ability to vote confidence in or withdraw it from a President of the Junta of Communities. Voting for the Cortes was on the basis of universal suffrage, which comprised all nationals over 18 years of age, registered in Castilla–La Mancha and in full enjoyment of their political rights. Additionally, Castilian-Manchegan people abroad were required to apply for voting before being permitted to vote, a system known as "begged" or expat vote (Spanish: Voto rogado).

The 33 members of the Cortes of Castilla–La Mancha were elected using the D'Hondt method and a closed list proportional representation, with an electoral threshold of three percent of valid votes—which included blank ballots—being applied in each constituency. Additionally, the use of the D'Hondt method might result in an effective threshold over three percent, depending on the district magnitude. Seats were allocated to constituencies, corresponding to the provinces of Albacete, Ciudad Real, Cuenca, Guadalajara and Toledo. Each constituency was entitled to an initial minimum of three seats, with the remaining 18 allocated among the constituencies in proportion to their populations. (Note: The electoral law was amended twice, in 2012 and 2014. The 2012 amendment provided for a 53 seat-Cortes and a fixed allocation of seats among constituencies: 10 for Albacete, 12 for Ciudad Real, 9 for Cuenca, 9 for Guadalajara and 13 for Toledo. As a result of them being superseded by the 2014 amendment, no election was fought under these rules.)

The electoral law provided that parties, federations, coalitions and groupings of electors were allowed to present lists of candidates. However, groupings of electors were required to secure the signature of at least 1 percent of the electors registered in the constituency for which they sought election. Electors were barred from signing for more than one list of candidates. Concurrently, parties and federations intending to enter in coalition to take part jointly at an election were required to inform the relevant Electoral Commission within ten days of the election being called.

=== Election date ===
The term of the Cortes of Castilla–La Mancha expired four years after the date of their previous election. Elections to the Cortes were fixed for the fourth Sunday of May every four years. The previous election was held on 22 May 2011, setting the election date for the Cortes on 24 May 2015.

The President of the Junta of Communities had the prerogative to dissolve the Cortes of Castilla–La Mancha and call a snap election, provided that no motion of no confidence was in process, no nationwide election was due and some time requirements were met: namely, that dissolution did not occur either during the first legislative session or within the legislature's last year ahead of its scheduled expiry, nor before one year had elapsed since a previous dissolution. Any snap election held as a result of these circumstances would not alter the period to the next ordinary election, with elected lawmakers serving the remainder of its original four-year term. In the event of an investiture process failing to elect a regional President within a two-month period from the first ballot, the candidate from the party with the highest number of seats was to be deemed automatically elected.

== Opinion polls ==
The tables below list opinion polling results in reverse chronological order, showing the most recent first and using the dates when the survey fieldwork was done, as opposed to the date of publication. Where the fieldwork dates are unknown, the date of publication is given instead. The highest percentage figure in each polling survey is displayed with its background shaded in the leading party's colour. If a tie ensues, this is applied to the figures with the highest percentages. The "Lead" column on the right shows the percentage-point difference between the parties with the highest percentages in a poll.

=== Voting intention estimates ===
The table below lists weighted voting intention estimates. Refusals are generally excluded from the party vote percentages, while question wording and the treatment of "don't know" responses and those not intending to vote may vary between polling organisations. When available, seat projections determined by the polling organisations are displayed below (or in place of) the percentages in a smaller font; 17 seats were required for an absolute majority in the Cortes of Castilla–La Mancha (25 until 13 August 2012 and 27 from 13 August 2012 to 21 July 2014).

Color key:

Poll conducted after legal ban on opinion polls Exit poll

Polling firm/Commissioner	Fieldwork date	Sample size	Turnout	PP	PSOE	IU	UPyD	Podemos	C's	Lead
2015 regional election	24 May 2015	—N/a	71.5	37.5; 16	36.1; 15	3.1; 0	1.0; 0	9.7; 2	8.6; 0	1.4
TNS Demoscopia/RTVE–FORTA	24 May 2015	20,250	?	38.4; 15/17	35.2; 13/15	–	–	9.9; 1/2	7.0; 0/1	3.2
GAD3/Antena 3	11–22 May 2015	?	?	? 15/16	? 13/14	–	–	? 2/3	? 0/3	?
GAD3/ABC	17 May 2015	?	?	39.4; 16/17	27.5; 10/11	–	–	10.6; 2/3	14.2; 3/4	11.9
NC Report/La Razón	17 May 2015	900	?	40.8; 16/17	35.6; 12/13	3.1; 0	0.9; 0	8.9; 1/2	9.3; 1/2	5.2
Sigma Dos/El Mundo	8–12 May 2015	1,200	?	37.9; 15/17	32.9; 11/13	4.3; 0	–	10.7; 3	9.6; 2/3	5.0
PP	27 Apr–8 May 2015	5,000	?	37.5; 17	33.6; 12	4.5; 0	–	10.3; 2	9.8; 2	3.9
Metroscopia/El País	30 Apr–5 May 2015	2,000	77	35.1; 14	26.6; 10	–	–	12.6; 4	17.6; 5	8.5
Noxa/PSOE	28 Apr–4 May 2015	2,000	?	31.6; 12	32.3; 14	–	–	10.0; 2	17.0; 5	0.7
Sigma Dos/La Tribuna	27 Apr–4 May 2015	1,500	?	37.6; 15/16	28.8; 11	6.4; 0	–	11.4; 3/4	11.1; 2/4	8.8
lavozdeltajo.com	23 Apr–4 May 2015	7,274	?	39.5; 13/14	40.1; 14/15	1.2; 0	0.2; 0	10.7; 3/4	8.5; 2/3	0.6
GAD3/ABC	23–28 Apr 2015	1,004	?	40.1; 17/18	25.5; 9/10	3.6; 0	0.8; 0	9.1; 2/3	16.9; 3/5	14.6
CIS	23 Mar–19 Apr 2015	1,961	?	34.9; 14/15	35.1; 13	3.3; 0	1.4; 0	9.9; 2	12.0; 3/4	0.2
Noxa/La Calle	11–17 Apr 2015	2,000	75.6	35.1; 14	37.1; 14	3.1; 0	2.9; 0	11.2; 4	8.5; 1	2.0
Noxa/La Calle	7–14 Mar 2015	2,000	73.6	35.4; 14	36.4; 14	2.8; 0	3.6; 0	11.9; 4	7.8; 1	1.0
NC Report/La Razón	2–11 Mar 2015	900	?	42.3; 17/18	33.1; 10/11	2.8; 0	1.1; 0	10.0; 2/3	9.2; 2/3	9.2
PSOE	25 Feb 2015	?	?	? 14/15	? 15/16	–	–	? 3/5	–	?
PP	20 Feb 2015	?	?	? 17	? 11/14	? 1/2	–	? 4/5	–	?
PP	28 Jan 2015	?	?	? 18	? 10	–	–	? 5	–	?
GAD3/ABC	7–21 Jan 2015	2,002	?	42.3; 18	32.5; 11	–	–	11.6; 4	–	9.8
Asturbarómetro	10 Dec–9 Jan 2015	?	?	42.9; 17	28.1; 10	2.7; 0	2.8; 0	16.4; 6	2.4; 0	14.8
Llorente & Cuenca	31 Oct 2014	?	?	? 13/15	? 14/16	–	–	? 2/4	–	?
NC Report/La Tribuna	12–23 Oct 2014	3,000	70.7	42.6; 17	35.5; 13	3.2; 0	3.4; 0	12.4; 3	–	7.1
2014 EP election	25 May 2014	—N/a	46.4	37.7 (24)	28.8 (18)	8.7 (4)	7.2 (4)	6.4 (3)	2.2 (0)	8.9
GAD3/ABC	26 Mar–10 Apr 2014	1,500	?	44.8; 28	38.7; 23	8.2; 2	–	–	–	6.1
NC Report/La Tribuna	18–28 Nov 2013	3,000	69.0	41.3; 27	38.9; 23	7.5; 3	5.6; 0	–	–	2.4
NC Report/La Razón	15 Oct–12 Nov 2013	?	?	? 27	? 23/24	? 1/2	? 0/1	–	–	?
NC Report/La Tribuna	2–15 May 2013	3,000	?	41.9; 27	39.7; 23	7.2; 3	5.5; 0	–	–	2.2
NC Report/La Razón	15 Apr–10 May 2013	350	?	41.8; 27	40.2; 23/24	? 2/3	–	–	–	1.6
GAD3/ABC	1–22 Apr 2013	1,500	?	43.5; 28	40.1; 22	8.9; 3	3.3; 0	–	–	3.4
2011 general election	20 Nov 2011	—N/a	75.8	55.8 (32)	30.3 (17)	5.8 (0)	5.0 (0)	–	–	25.5
2011 regional election	22 May 2011	—N/a	76.0	48.1; 25	43.4; 24	3.8; 0	1.8; 0	–	–	4.7

=== Voting preferences ===
The table below lists raw, unweighted voting preferences.

Polling firm/Commissioner	Fieldwork date	Sample size	PP	PSOE	IU	UPyD	Podemos	C's	Question	X mark	Lead
2015 regional election	24 May 2015	—N/a	26.7	25.7	2.2	0.7	6.9	6.1	—N/a	27.2	1.0
CIS	23 Mar–19 Apr 2015	1,961	18.5	14.9	2.8	0.5	8.0	8.3	34.7	7.8	3.6
2014 EP election	25 May 2014	—N/a	17.3	13.2	4.0	3.3	2.9	1.0	—N/a	52.9	4.1
2011 general election	20 Nov 2011	—N/a	42.2	22.9	4.4	3.8	–	–	—N/a	23.3	19.3
2011 regional election	22 May 2011	—N/a	36.5	32.9	2.9	1.3	–	–	—N/a	23.1	3.6

=== Victory preferences ===
The table below lists opinion polling on the victory preferences for each party in the event of a regional election taking place.

Polling firm/Commissioner	Fieldwork date	Sample size	PP	PSOE	IU	UPyD	Podemos	C's	Other/ None	Question	Lead
CIS	23 Mar–19 Apr 2015	1,961	22.7	20.3	2.9	0.8	8.8	9.1	8.3	27.1	2.4

=== Victory likelihood ===
The table below lists opinion polling on the perceived likelihood of victory for each party in the event of a regional election taking place.

Polling firm/Commissioner	Fieldwork date	Sample size	PP	PSOE	Podemos	C's	Other/ None	Question	Lead
CIS	23 Mar–19 Apr 2015	1,961	42.4	18.0	2.0	0.5	1.0	36.1	24.4

=== Preferred President ===
The table below lists opinion polling on leader preferences to become president of the Junta of Communities of Castilla–La Mancha.

Polling firm/Commissioner	Fieldwork date	Sample size						Other/ None/ Not care	Question	Lead
Polling firm/Commissioner	Fieldwork date	Sample size	Cospedal PP	Page PSOE	Ávila IU	Molina Podemos	Ligero C's	Other/ None/ Not care	Question	Lead
CIS	23 Mar–19 Apr 2015	1,961	25.7	17.1	1.4	2.5	2.0	3.6	47.8	8.6
Noxa/La Calle	7–14 Mar 2015	2,000	39.1	46.7	–	–	–	–	14.2	7.6

== Results ==
=== Overall ===
← Summary of the 24 May 2015 Cortes of Castilla–La Mancha election results →
Parties and alliances	Popular vote			Seats	
Parties and alliances	Votes	%	±pp	Total	+/−
People's Party (PP)	413,349	37.49	−10.62	16	−9
Spanish Socialist Workers' Party (PSOE)	398,104	36.11	−7.29	15	−9
We Can (Podemos)	107,463	9.75	New	2	+2
Citizens–Party of the Citizenry (C's)	95,230	8.64	New	0	±0
Let's Win Castilla–La Mancha–The Greens–United Left (Ganemos–LV–IU)^{1}	34,230	3.10	−0.67	0	±0
Union, Progress and Democracy (UPyD)	10,866	0.99	−0.76	0	±0
Animalist Party Against Mistreatment of Animals (PACMA)	8,943	0.81	+0.46	0	±0
Vox (Vox)	5,302	0.48	New	0	±0
Union of Independent Citizens (UCIN)^{2}	5,061	0.46	+0.34	0	±0
The Greens–Green Group (LV–GV)	1,918	0.17	−0.03	0	±0
Castilian Party–Castilian Unity (PCAS–UdCa)^{3}	1,532	0.14	−0.15	0	±0
Communist Party of the Peoples of Spain (PCPE)	987	0.09	New	0	±0
Independents and Liberals for Manzanares (LIM)	287	0.03	New	0	±0
Blank ballots	19,256	1.75	+0.08		
Total	1,102,528			33	−16
Valid votes	1,102,528	97.82	−0.87		
Invalid votes	24,619	2.18	+0.87		
Votes cast / turnout	1,127,147	71.50	−4.46		
Abstentions	449,204	28.50	+4.46		
Registered voters	1,576,351				
Sources
Footnotes: ^{1} Let's Win Castilla–La Mancha–The Greens–United Left results are compared to United Left of Castilla–La Mancha totals in the 2011 election.; ^{2} Union of Independent Citizens results are compared to Union of Independent Citizens of Toledo totals in the 2011 election.; ^{3} Castilian Party–Castilian Unity results are compared to the combined totals of Castilian Party and Castilian Unity in the 2011 election.

Popular vote
PP	37.49%
PSOE	36.11%
Podemos	9.75%
C's	8.64%
Ganemos–LV–IU	3.10%
Others	3.17%
Blank ballots	1.75%

Seats
PP	48.48%
PSOE	45.45%
Podemos	6.06%

=== Distribution by constituency ===
Constituency	PP		PSOE		Podemos	
Constituency	%	S	%	S	%	S
Albacete	36.7	3	33.8	3	11.2	−
Ciudad Real	37.1	4	38.8	4	8.4	−
Cuenca	41.5	3	37.6	2	8.0	−
Guadalajara	33.7	2	30.0	2	14.6	1
Toledo	38.3	4	36.9	4	8.8	1
Total	37.5	16	36.1	15	9.7	2

== Aftermath ==
Investiture; Emiliano García-Page (PSOE)
Ballot →	1 July 2015
Required majority →	17 out of 33
Yes: • PSOE (15); • Podemos (2)	17 / 33
No: • PP (16)	16 / 33
Abstentions	0 / 33
Absentees	0 / 33
