= 2011 Castilian-Manchegan regional election =

Election in the Spanish region of Castilla–La Mancha

- 22 May 2011

All 49 seats in the Cortes of Castilla–La Mancha 25 seats needed for a majority
- Opinion polls
- Registered: 1,566,641 ▲4.0%
- Turnout: 1,189,986 (76.0%) ▲2.3 pp
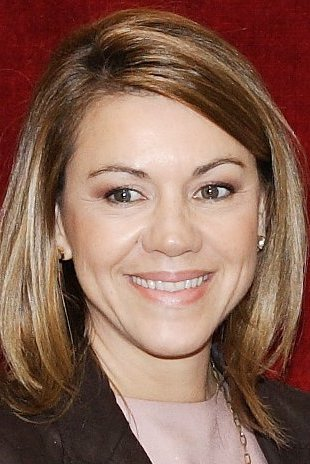

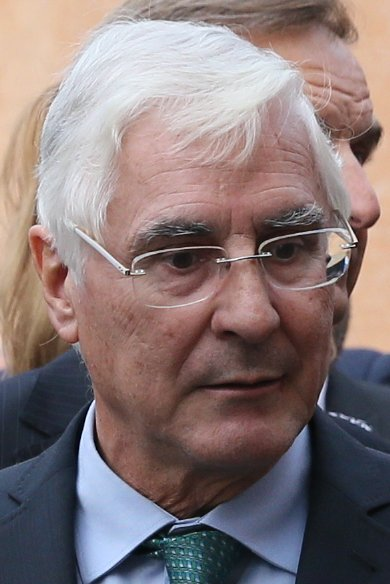
	First party	Second party
Leader	María Dolores de Cospedal	José María Barreda
Party	PP	PSOE
Leader since	14 June 2006	29 April 2004
Leader's seat	Toledo	Toledo
Last election	21 seats, 42.4%	26 seats, 52.0%
Seats won	25	24
Seat change	▲4	▼2
Popular vote	564,954	509,738
Percentage	48.1%	43.4%
Swing	▲5.7 pp	▼8.6 pp
- Constituency results map for the Cortes of Castilla–La Mancha
President before election
José María Barreda
PSOE
Elected President
María Dolores de Cospedal
PP

A regional election was held in Castilla–La Mancha on 22 May 2011 to elect the 8th Cortes of the autonomous community. All 49 seats in the Cortes were up for election. It was held concurrently with regional elections in twelve other autonomous communities and local elections all across Spain.

The Spanish Socialist Workers' Party (PSOE), which had formed the government of the region since the first election in 1983, lost the vote to the opposition People's Party (PP) under María Dolores de Cospedal, which gained overall control of the Cortes for the first time. As a result of the election, Cospedal replaced outgoing José María Barreda as President of the Junta of Communities of Castilla–La Mancha.

== Overview ==
=== Electoral system ===
The Cortes of Castilla–La Mancha were the devolved, unicameral legislature of the autonomous community of Castilla–La Mancha, having legislative power in regional matters as defined by the Spanish Constitution and the Castilian-Manchegan Statute of Autonomy, as well as the ability to vote confidence in or withdraw it from a President of the Junta of Communities. Voting for the Cortes was on the basis of universal suffrage, which comprised all nationals over 18 years of age, registered in Castilla–La Mancha and in full enjoyment of their political rights. Amendments to the electoral law in 2011 required for Castilian-Manchegan people abroad to apply for voting before being permitted to vote, a system known as "begged" or expat vote (Spanish: Voto rogado).

The 49 members of the Cortes of Castilla–La Mancha were elected using the D'Hondt method and a closed list proportional representation, with an electoral threshold of three percent of valid votes—which included blank ballots—being applied in each constituency. Additionally, the use of the D'Hondt method might result in an effective threshold over three percent, depending on the district magnitude. Seats were allocated to constituencies, corresponding to the provinces of Albacete, Ciudad Real, Cuenca, Guadalajara and Toledo. Each constituency was allocated a fixed number of seats: 10 for Albacete, 11 for Ciudad Real, 8 for Cuenca, 8 for Guadalajara and 12 for Toledo.

The electoral law provided that parties, federations, coalitions and groupings of electors were allowed to present lists of candidates. However, groupings of electors were required to secure the signature of at least 1 percent of the electors registered in the constituency for which they sought election. Electors were barred from signing for more than one list of candidates. Concurrently, parties and federations intending to enter in coalition to take part jointly at an election were required to inform the relevant Electoral Commission within ten days of the election being called.

=== Election date ===
The term of the Cortes of Castilla–La Mancha expired four years after the date of their previous election. Elections to the Cortes were fixed for the fourth Sunday of May every four years. The previous election was held on 27 May 2007, setting the election date for the Cortes on 22 May 2011.

The President of the Junta of Communities had the prerogative to dissolve the Cortes of Castilla–La Mancha and call a snap election, provided that no motion of no confidence was in process, no nationwide election was due and some time requirements were met: namely, that dissolution did not occur either during the first legislative session or within the legislature's last year ahead of its scheduled expiry, nor before one year had elapsed since a previous dissolution. Any snap election held as a result of these circumstances would not alter the period to the next ordinary election, with elected lawmakers serving the remainder of its original four-year term. In the event of an investiture process failing to elect a regional President within a two-month period from the first ballot, the candidate from the party with the highest number of seats was to be deemed automatically elected.

== Opinion polls ==
The table below lists voting intention estimates in reverse chronological order, showing the most recent first and using the dates when the survey fieldwork was done, as opposed to the date of publication. Where the fieldwork dates are unknown, the date of publication is given instead. The highest percentage figure in each polling survey is displayed with its background shaded in the leading party's colour. If a tie ensues, this is applied to the figures with the highest percentages. The "Lead" column on the right shows the percentage-point difference between the parties with the highest percentages in a poll. When available, seat projections determined by the polling organisations are displayed below (or in place of) the percentages in a smaller font; 25 seats were required for an absolute majority in the Cortes of Castilla–La Mancha (24 until 17 November 2007).

Polling firm/Commissioner	Fieldwork date	Sample size	Turnout	PSOE	PP	IU	UPyD	Lead
2011 regional election	22 May 2011	—N/a	76.0	43.4; 24	48.1; 25	3.8; 0	1.8; 0	4.7
GAD/COPE	16 May 2011	?	75	44.1; 22/24	49.6; 25/27	–	–	5.5
Obradoiro de Socioloxía/Público	16 May 2011	?	?	47.5; 25	46.5; 24	–	–	1.0
TNS Demoscopia/Antena 3	14 May 2011	?	?	43.9; 23/25	46.6; 24/26	4.5; 0	–	2.7
Metroscopia/El País	11–12 May 2011	1,800	?	42.2; 21/24	47.9; 25/28	–	–	5.7
Sigma Dos/El Mundo	9–11 May 2011	1,000	?	44.6; 22/25	48.4; 24/27	3.9; 0	–	3.8
NC Report/La Razón	3–10 May 2011	?	?	46.9; 24	46.3; 25	–	–	0.6
NC Report/La Razón	25 Apr 2011	?	?	47.9; 24/25	46.8; 24/25	4.6; 0	–	1.1
Celeste-Tel/Terra	13–20 Apr 2011	900	?	46.1; 25	48.3; 24	4.6; 0	–	2.2
CIS	17 Mar – 17 Apr 2011	1,990	?	45.0; 24	46.3; 25	4.4; 0	0.8; 0	1.3
Sigma Dos/El Mundo	11–14 Apr 2011	1,000	?	43.9; 22/24	49.3; 25/27	3.6; 0	–	5.4
Ikerfel/Vocento	8–11 Apr 2011	1,850	?	42.5; 21/23	48.6; 26/28	–	–	6.1
GAD/ABC	28 Feb – 1 Mar 2011	1,000	?	44.0; 22/24	50.3; 25/27	–	–	6.3
PSOE	26 Jan – 5 Feb 2011	2,000	?	44.5; 25	43.9; 24	–	–	0.6
Celeste-Tel/La Tribuna	11 Jan 2011	?	?	47.2; 25	45.3; 24	4.4; 0	2.1; 0	1.9
NC Report/La Razón	30 Dec – 3 Jan 2011	?	?	48.2; 24/25	46.2; 24/25	–	–	2.0
DYM/ABC	20–30 Dec 2010	514	?	45.6; 23	50.8; 26	–	–	5.2
Sigma Dos/El Mundo	17–22 Dec 2010	1,000	?	43.7; 20/25	50.0; 24/29	–	–	6.3
Demoscopia y Servicios/PP	2–4 Nov 2010	1,500	?	42.2; 22	46.9; 27	5.9; 0	4.2; 0	4.7
Demoscopia y Servicios/PP	11–14 Oct 2010	1,500	?	41.3; 22	47.4; 27	–	–	6.1
Sigma Dos/PP	29 Jun – 2 Jul 2010	?	?	41.4; 22	47.4; 27	–	–	6.0
Celeste-Tel/La Tribuna	28 Jun 2010	?	71.1	47.4; 25	45.0; 24	4.2; 0	2.5; 0	2.4
Sigma Dos/El Mundo	21–25 May 2010	1,000	?	41.4; 20/23	49.7; 26/29	4.1; 0	–	8.3
Noxa/PSOE	14 Mar 2010	?	?	48.1; 25/26	44.1; 23/24	3.1; 0	3.3; 0	4.0
PP	4–14 Mar 2010	2,000	?	44.8; 24	45.6; 25	4.1; 0	3.0; 0	0.8
Obradoiro de Socioloxía/Público	1–8 Mar 2010	795	?	46.1; 25	44.6; 24	3.2; 0	3.2; 0	1.5
2009 EP election	7 Jun 2009	—N/a	51.7	39.9 (21)	51.5 (28)	3.0 (0)	2.6 (0)	11.6
2008 general election	9 Mar 2008	—N/a	80.0	44.5 (23)	49.4 (26)	2.9 (0)	1.1 (0)	4.9
2007 regional election	27 May 2007	—N/a	73.7	52.0; 26	42.4; 21	3.4; 0	–	9.6

== Results ==
=== Overall ===
← Summary of the 22 May 2011 Cortes of Castilla–La Mancha election results →
Parties and alliances	Popular vote			Seats	
Parties and alliances	Votes	%	±pp	Total	+/−
People's Party (PP)	564,954	48.11	+5.73	25	+4
Spanish Socialist Workers' Party (PSOE)	509,738	43.40	−8.56	24	−2
United Left of Castilla–La Mancha (IUCLM)	44,302	3.77	+0.35	0	±0
Union, Progress and Democracy (UPyD)	20,554	1.75	New	0	±0
Anti-Bullfighting Party Against Mistreatment of Animals (PACMA)	4,128	0.35	New	0	±0
Castilian Party (PCAS)^{1}	2,752	0.23	±0.00	0	±0
The Greens–Green Group (LV–GV)	2,375	0.20	New	0	±0
Ecolo–Greens Guadalajara (Ecolo–V)	1,673	0.14	New	0	±0
Citizens for Blank Votes (CenB)	1,615	0.14	New	0	±0
Union of Independent Citizens of Toledo (UCIT)	1,430	0.12	New	0	±0
Castilian Unity (UdCa)	745	0.06	−0.05	0	±0
Citizens of Democratic Centre (CCD)	507	0.04	New	0	±0
Blank ballots	19,643	1.67	+0.39		
Total	1,174,416			49	+2
Valid votes	1,174,416	98.69	−0.56		
Invalid votes	15,570	1.31	+0.56		
Votes cast / turnout	1,189,986	75.96	+2.22		
Abstentions	376,655	24.04	−2.22		
Registered voters	1,566,641				
Sources
Footnotes: ^{1} Castilian Party results are compared to Commoners' Land totals in the 2007 election.

Popular vote
PP	48.11%
PSOE	43.40%
IUCLM	3.77%
UPyD	1.75%
Others	1.30%
Blank ballots	1.67%

Seats
PP	51.02%
PSOE	48.98%

=== Distribution by constituency ===
Constituency	PP		PSOE	
Constituency	%	S	%	S
Albacete	48.4	5	41.7	5
Ciudad Real	46.1	5	46.3	6
Cuenca	47.4	4	46.6	4
Guadalajara	49.8	5	38.0	3
Toledo	49.1	6	42.9	6
Total	48.1	25	43.4	24

== Aftermath ==
Investiture; María Dolores de Cospedal (PP)
Ballot →	21 June 2011
Required majority →	25 out of 49
Yes: • PP (25)	25 / 49
No: • PSOE (24)	24 / 49
Abstentions	0 / 49
Absentees	0 / 49
