= 1983 Castilian-Manchegan regional election =

Election in the Spanish region of Castilla–La Mancha

- 8 May 1983

All 44 seats in the Cortes of Castilla–La Mancha 23 seats needed for a majority
- Registered: 1,230,011
- Turnout: 901,872 (73.3%)
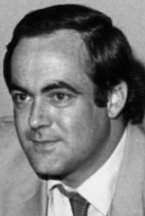

| | First party | Second party |
|---|---|---|
| Leader | José Bono | José Lara |
| Party | PSOE | AP–PDP–PL |
| Leader since | 25 March 1983 | 1983 |
| Leader's seat | Albacete | Toledo |
| Seats won | 23 | 21 |
| Popular vote | 416,177 | 364,676 |
| Percentage | 46.7% | 40.9% |
- Constituency results map for the Cortes of Castilla–La Mancha
President before election
Jesús Fuentes Lázaro
PSOE
Elected President
José Bono
PSOE

A regional election was held in Castilla–La Mancha on 8 May 1983 to elect the 1st Cortes of the autonomous community. All 44 seats in the Cortes were up for election. It was held concurrently with regional elections in twelve other autonomous communities and local elections all across Spain.

Only two political parties were able to secure parliamentary representation in the Cortes: the Spanish Socialist Workers' Party (PSOE) under José Bono, which obtained 23 out of 44 seats—an absolute majority—and the People's Coalition, an electoral alliance formed by the conservative People's Alliance (AP), the christian democratic People's Democratic Party (PDP) and the Liberal Union (UL). As a result of the election, José Bono became the first democratically elected President of the Junta of Communities of Castilla–La Mancha.

== Overview ==
=== Electoral system ===
The Cortes of Castilla–La Mancha were the devolved, unicameral legislature of the autonomous community of Castilla–La Mancha, having legislative power in regional matters as defined by the Spanish Constitution and the Castilian-Manchegan Statute of Autonomy, as well as the ability to vote confidence in or withdraw it from a regional president.

Transitory Provision First of the Statute established a specific electoral procedure for the first election to the Cortes of Castilla–La Mancha, to be supplemented by the provisions within Royal Decree-Law 20/1977, of 18 March, and its related regulations. Voting for the Cortes was on the basis of universal suffrage, which comprised all nationals over 18 years of age, registered in Castilla–La Mancha and in full enjoyment of their political rights. The 44 members of the Cortes of Castilla–La Mancha were elected using the D'Hondt method and a closed list proportional representation, with an electoral threshold of five percent of valid votes—which included blank ballots—being applied regionally. Seats were allocated to constituencies, corresponding to the provinces of Albacete, Ciudad Real, Cuenca, Guadalajara and Toledo, with each being allocated a fixed number of seats: 9 for Albacete, 10 for Ciudad Real, 8 for Cuenca, 7 for Guadalajara and 10 for Toledo.

The electoral law allowed for parties and federations registered in the interior ministry, coalitions and groupings of electors to present lists of candidates. Parties and federations intending to form a coalition ahead of an election were required to inform the relevant Electoral Commission within fifteen days of the election call, whereas groupings of electors needed to secure the signature of at least one-thousandth of the electorate in the constituencies for which they sought election—with a compulsory minimum of 500 signatures—disallowing electors from signing for more than one list of candidates.

=== Election date ===
The Junta of Communities of Castilla–La Mancha, in agreement with the Government of Spain, was required to call an election to the Cortes of Castilla–La Mancha within from 1 February to 31 May 1983. In the event of an investiture process failing to elect a regional president within a two-month period from the first ballot, the candidate from the party with the highest number of seats was to be deemed automatically elected.

== Opinion polls ==
The tables below list opinion polling results in reverse chronological order, showing the most recent first and using the dates when the survey fieldwork was done, as opposed to the date of publication. Where the fieldwork dates are unknown, the date of publication is given instead. The highest percentage figure in each polling survey is displayed with its background shaded in the leading party's colour. If a tie ensues, this is applied to the figures with the highest percentages. The "Lead" column on the right shows the percentage-point difference between the parties with the highest percentages in a poll.

=== Voting preferences ===
The table below lists raw, unweighted voting preferences.

| Polling firm/Commissioner | Fieldwork date | Sample size | UCD | PSOE | PCE | AP–PDP–UL | UN | CDS | PDL | Question | X mark | Lead |
|---|---|---|---|---|---|---|---|---|---|---|---|---|
| 1983 regional election | 8 May 1983 | —N/a | – | 33.8 | 5.0 | 29.6 | – | 2.2 | 1.3 | —N/a | 26.7 | 4.2 |
| Alef–DYM–Emopública/CIS | 20–24 Apr 1983 | 1,994 | – | 25.5 | 2.1 | 14.4 | – | 1.2 | 0.2 | 49.2 | 6.3 | 11.1 |
| CISE–Metra Seis–ECO/CIS | 5–11 Apr 1983 | 698 | – | 34.2 | 2.2 | 15.7 | – | 1.7 | – | 35.4 | 10.2 | 18.5 |
| 1982 general election | 28 Oct 1982 | —N/a | 8.9 | 40.6 | 3.1 | 25.8 (Note: Results for CD (1979) and AP–PDP (1982).) | 1.2 | 1.7 | – | —N/a | 15.9 | 14.8 |
| 1979 general election | 1 Mar 1979 | —N/a | 31.0 | 24.9 | 7.0 | 4.1 | 3.1 | – | – | —N/a | 27.2 | 6.1 |

== Results ==
=== Overall ===
Summary of the 8 May 1983 Cortes of Castilla–La Mancha election results →
| Parties and alliances | Popular vote | | | Seats | |
| Parties and alliances | Votes | % | ±pp | Total | +/− |
|---|---|---|---|---|---|
| Spanish Socialist Workers' Party (PSOE) | 416,177 | 46.70 | n/a | 23 | n/a |
| People's Coalition (AP–PDP–UL) | 364,676 | 40.92 | n/a | 21 | n/a |
| Communist Party of Spain (PCE) | 61,132 | 6.86 | n/a | 0 | n/a |
| Democratic and Social Centre (CDS) | 26,911 | 3.02 | n/a | 0 | n/a |
| Liberal Democratic Party (PDL) | 15,890 | 1.78 | n/a | 0 | n/a |
| Spanish Communist Workers' Party–Unified Communist Party (PCOE–PCEU) | 579 | 0.06 | n/a | 0 | n/a |
| Blank ballots | 5,823 | 0.65 | n/a | | |
| Total | 891,188 | | | 44 | n/a |
| Valid votes | 891,188 | 98.82 | n/a | | |
| Invalid votes | 10,684 | 1.18 | n/a | | |
| Votes cast / turnout | 901,872 | 73.32 | n/a | | |
| Abstentions | 328,139 | 26.68 | n/a | | |
| Registered voters | 1,230,011 | | | | |

Popular vote
| PSOE | 46.70% |
| AP–PDP–UL | 40.92% |
| PCE | 6.86% |
| CDS | 3.02% |
| PDL | 1.78% |
| PCOE–PCEU | 0.06% |
| Blank ballots | 0.65% |

Seats
| PSOE | 52.27% |
| AP–PDP–UL | 47.73% |

=== Distribution by constituency ===
| Constituency | PSOE | | CP | |
| Constituency | % | S | % | S |
|---|---|---|---|---|
| Albacete | 52.8 | 5 | 36.9 | 4 |
| Ciudad Real | 50.5 | 6 | 39.1 | 4 |
| Cuenca | 41.9 | 4 | 44.1 | 4 |
| Guadalajara | 39.7 | 3 | 46.2 | 4 |
| Toledo | 43.7 | 5 | 42.1 | 5 |
| Total | 46.7 | 23 | 40.9 | 21 |

== Aftermath ==
Investiture; José Bono (PSOE)
| Ballot → | 6 June 1983 |
| Required majority → | 23 out of 44 |
| Yes: • PSOE (23) | 23 / 44 |
| No: • AP–PDP–UL (18) | 18 / 44 |
| Abstentions | 0 / 44 |
| Absentees: • AP–PDP–UL (3) | 3 / 44 |
