= Guadalajara (disambiguation) =

Guadalajara is the capital of the state of Jalisco, Mexico.

Guadalajara may also refer to:

== Places ==
=== Mexico ===
- Guadalajara (international airport)
- Guadalajara metropolitan area, a metropolitan area in the state of Jalisco
- University of Guadalajara, a public university in Guadalajara, Jalisco
- C.D. Guadalajara, a Mexican association football club

=== Spain ===
- Province of Guadalajara, a province in Castile-La Mancha
  - Guadalajara, Spain, the capital of the province
  - Guadalajara (Congress of Deputies constituency)
  - Guadalajara (Senate constituency)
  - Guadalajara (Cortes of Castilla–La Mancha constituency)
- Guadalajara (RENFE station), a railway station in Guadalajara
- Battle of Guadalajara, a 1937 Spanish Civil War battle
- CD Guadalajara (Spain), a Spanish association football club

== Entertainment ==
- Guadalajara (film), a 1943 Mexican film directed by Chano Urueta
- "Guadalajara" (song), a 1937 song written and composed by Pepe Guízar
