= José Bono =

Spanish politician (born 1950)

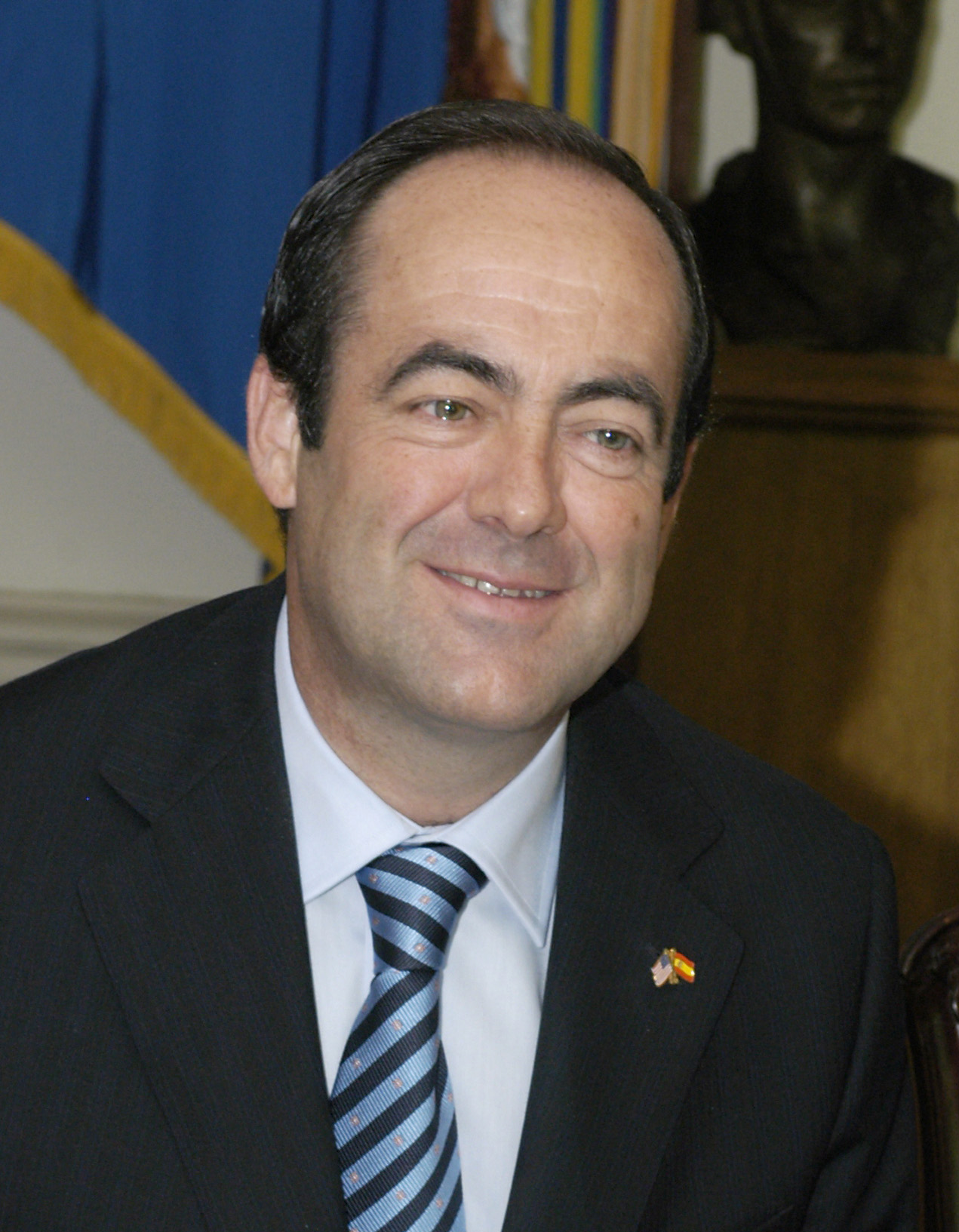

President of the Congress of Deputies
- In office 1 April 2008 – 13 December 2011
- Monarch: Juan Carlos I
- Preceded by: Manuel Marín
- Succeeded by: Jesús Posada

Minister of Defence
- In office 18 April 2004 – 11 April 2006
- Prime Minister: José Luis Rodríguez Zapatero
- Preceded by: Federico Trillo-Figueroa
- Succeeded by: José Antonio Alonso

President of Castile-La Mancha
- In office 6 June 1983 – 17 April 2004
- Monarch: Juan Carlos I
- Preceded by: Jesús Fuentes Lázaro
- Succeeded by: José María Barreda

Member of the Congress of Deputies
- In office 1 April 2008 – 13 December 2011
- Constituency: Toledo
- In office 1 March 1979 – 6 June 1982
- Constituency: Albacete

Member of the Cortes of Castile-La Mancha
- In office 7 May 1983 – 16 April 2004
- Constituency: Albacete; Toledo

Personal details
- Born: 14 December 1950 (age 75) Salobre, Spain
- Party: PSOE

José Bono Martínez (born 14 December 1950) is a politician of the Spanish Socialist Workers' Party (PSOE). He served as President of the Congress of Deputies during the 9th Legislature. Before that, he was the Minister of Defence of Spain from 18 April 2004 in the Government chaired by José Luis Rodríguez Zapatero. He left his ministerial post on 7 April 2006 and was replaced by former Minister of Interior, José Antonio Alonso. Bono had previously served as President of the Autonomous Community of Castile-La Mancha from 6 June 1983 to 17 April 2004. In 2020, he was granted Dominican Republic citizenship by means of a presidential decree.

== Minister of Defence ==
During his cabinet spell, José Bono was involved in various events receiving widespread news coverage in Spain. Some of them related to his role as Minister of Defence (e.g. the controversy created by the public declarations of Lt. General José Mena Aguado about the 1978 Spanish Constitution, defending the possibility of an intervention of the armed forces to maintain the territorial integrity of Spain), and others connected to his membership of the Socialist Workers' Party, the most significant of them being the detention of two members of the Popular Party (PP) who were participating with him in a popular demonstration, after they had allegedly attempted to assault him. He was elected President of the Congress of Deputies on 1 April 2008.

== See also ==
- History of Spain
- Politics of Spain
- Prime Minister of Spain

Political offices
Preceded by Jesús Fuentes Lázaro	President of Castile-La Mancha; 1983–2004	Succeeded by José María Barreda
Preceded by Federico Trillo-Figueroa	Minister of Defence; 2004-2006	Succeeded by José Antonio Alonso
Preceded by Manuel Marín	President of the Congress of Deputies; 2008-2011	Succeeded by Jesús Posada
Party political offices
Preceded by Miguel Ángel Martínez	Secretary-General of the Socialist Workers' Party of Castilla-La Mancha; 1988-1990	Succeeded by Juan Pedro Hernández Moltó
Preceded by Javier Paunlino	President of the Socialist Workers' Party of Castilla-La Mancha; 1990-1997	Succeeded by Juan de Dios Izquierdo Collado
Preceded by Manuel Pérez Castell	President of the Socialist Workers' Party of Castilla-La Mancha; 2004-2012	Succeeded by Matilde Valentín
