= Jesús Fuentes Lázaro =

Spanish politician (1946–2026)

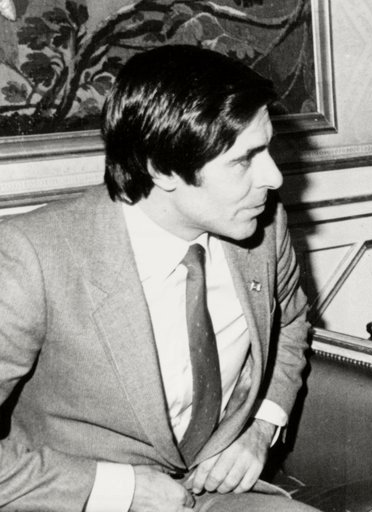
- Fuentes in 1983

President of the Regional Government of Castilla–La Mancha
- In office 22 December 1982 – 7 June 1983
- Preceded by: Gonzalo Payo Subiza
- Succeeded by: José Bono

Member of the Senate of Spain for Toledo
- In office 28 October 1989 – 6 June 1993

Member of the Congress of Deputies for Toledo
- In office 1 March 1979 – 28 October 1989

Personal details
- Born: 23 May 1946 Toledo, Spain
- Died: 7 February 2026 (aged 79) Toledo, Spain
- Party: PSOE
- Education: Complutense University of Madrid
- Occupation: Teacher

Jesús Fuentes Lázaro (23 May 1946 – 7 February 2026) was a Spanish politician of the Spanish Socialist Workers' Party.

Fuentes served in the Congress of Deputies from 1979 to 1989 and was a Senator from 1989 to 1993. He was also President of the Regional Government of Castilla–La Mancha from 1982 to 1983.

Fuentes died in Toledo on 7 February 2026, at the age of 79.
