= President of the Regional Government of Castilla–La Mancha =

Head of government of Castilla–La Mancha

President of the Regional Government of Communities of Castile–La Mancha
- Presidente de la Junta de Comunidades de Castilla-La Mancha
- Coat of arms of Castile–La Mancha

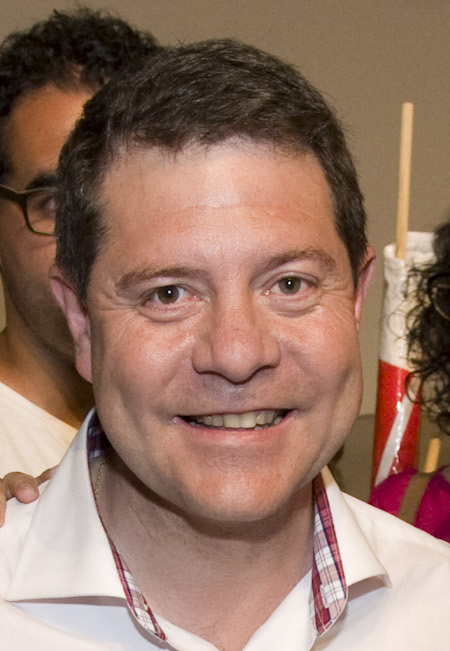
- Incumbent; Emiliano García-Page since 1 July 2015
- Style: Excelentísimo Señor
- Nominator: Cortes of Castilla–La Mancha
- Appointer: The Monarch countersigned by the Prime Minister
- Term length: Four years
- Inaugural holder: José Bono Martínez
- Formation: Castilian-Manchegan Statute of Autonomy; 6 June 1983

The President of the Regional Government of Communities of Castilla–La Mancha (Spanish: Presidente de la Junta de Comunidades de Castilla-La Mancha), usually known in English as the President of Castilla–La Mancha, is the head of government of Castilla–La Mancha. The president leads the executive branch of the regional government.

The office is established under the Castilian-Manchegan Statute of Autonomy. It is occupied by Emiliano García-Page.

== List of presidents ==
Portrait	Name (Birth–Death)	Term of office			Party	Government Composition	Election	Monarch (Reign)	Ref.
Portrait	Name (Birth–Death)	Took office	Left office	Duration	Party	Government Composition	Election	Monarch (Reign)	Ref.
	Antonio Fernández-Galiano (1926–1999)	29 November 1978	1 February 1982	3 years and 64 days	UCD		N/A	King; Juan Carlos I (1975–2014)	
	Gonzalo Payo Subiza (1931–2002)	1 February 1982	22 December 1982	324 days	UCD		N/A	King; Juan Carlos I (1975–2014)	
	Jesús Fuentes Lázaro (1946–2026)	22 December 1982	7 June 1983	167 days	PSOE		N/A	King; Juan Carlos I (1975–2014)	
	José Bono (born 1950)	7 June 1983	15 July 1987	20 years and 316 days	PSOE	Bono I PSOE	1983	King; Juan Carlos I (1975–2014)	
	José Bono (born 1950)	15 July 1987	4 July 1991	20 years and 316 days	PSOE	Bono II; PSOE	1987	King; Juan Carlos I (1975–2014)	
	José Bono (born 1950)	4 July 1991	3 July 1995	20 years and 316 days	PSOE	Bono III; PSOE	1991	King; Juan Carlos I (1975–2014)	
	José Bono (born 1950)	3 July 1995	15 July 1999	20 years and 316 days	PSOE	Bono IV; PSOE	1995	King; Juan Carlos I (1975–2014)	
	José Bono (born 1950)	15 July 1999	30 June 2003	20 years and 316 days	PSOE	Bono V PSOE	1999	King; Juan Carlos I (1975–2014)	
	José Bono (born 1950)	30 June 2003	18 April 2004 (resigned)	20 years and 316 days	PSOE	Bono VI; PSOE	2003	King; Juan Carlos I (1975–2014)	
During this interval, Vice President José María Barreda served as acting officeholder.						Bono VI; PSOE	2003	King; Juan Carlos I (1975–2014)	
	José María Barreda (born 1953)	29 April 2004	29 June 2007	7 years and 54 days	PSOE	Barreda I PSOE	2003	King; Juan Carlos I (1975–2014)	
	José María Barreda (born 1953)	29 June 2007	22 June 2011	7 years and 54 days	PSOE	Barreda II; PSOE	2007	King; Juan Carlos I (1975–2014)	
	María Dolores de Cospedal (born 1965)	22 June 2011	3 July 2015	4 years and 11 days	PP	de Cospedal; PP	2011	King; Felipe VI (2014–present)	
	Emiliano García-Page (born 1968)	3 July 2015	5 July 2019	11 years and 66 days	PSOE	García-Page I PSOE until August 2017; PSOE–Podemos from August 2017	2015	King; Felipe VI (2014–present)	
	Emiliano García-Page (born 1968)	5 July 2019	8 July 2023	11 years and 66 days	PSOE	García-Page II; PSOE	2019	King; Felipe VI (2014–present)	
	Emiliano García-Page (born 1968)	8 July 2023	Incumbent	11 years and 66 days	PSOE	García-Page III; PSOE	2023	King; Felipe VI (2014–present)	
