= Cuenca (Cortes of Castilla–La Mancha constituency) =

Coordinates: 40°00′N 2°00′W

- Cortes of Castilla–La Mancha; Electoral constituency
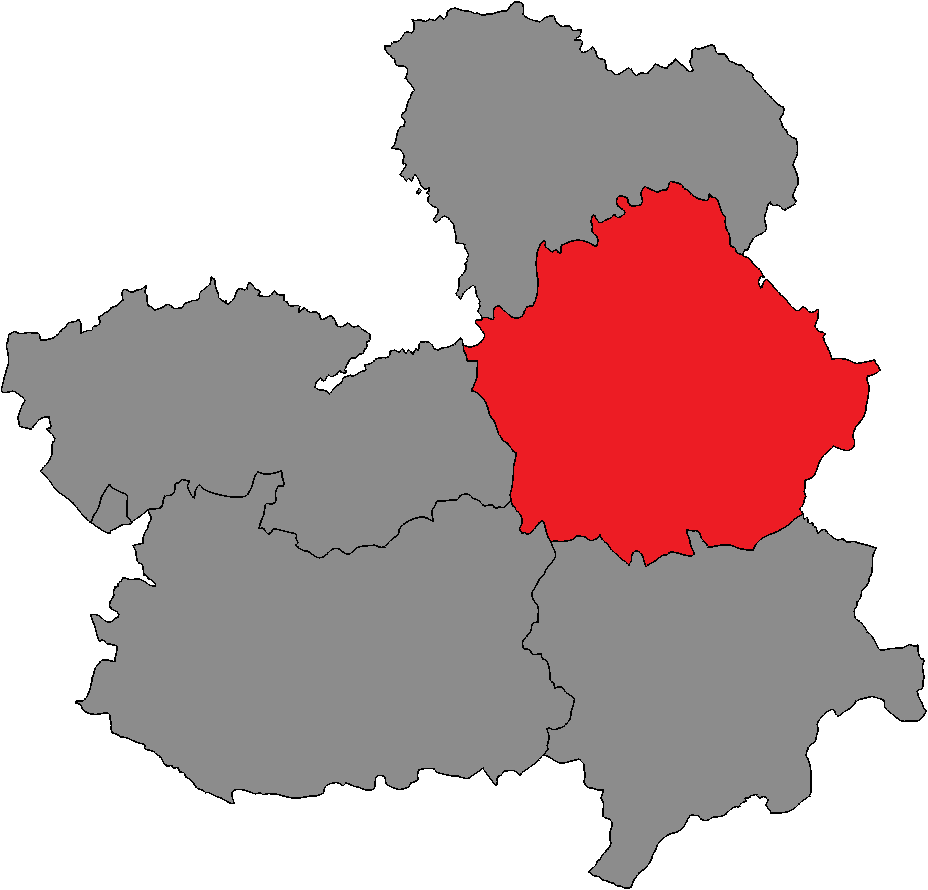
- Location of Cuenca within Castilla–La Mancha
- Province: Cuenca
- Autonomous community: Castilla–La Mancha
- Population: ▲197,606 (2024)
- Electorate: ▼153,474 (2023)
- Major settlements: Cuenca

Current constituency
- Created: 1983
- Seats: 8 (1983–2012); 9 (2012–2014); 5 (2014–present)
- Members: PSOE (3); PP (2)

Cuenca is one of the five constituencies (Spanish: circunscripciones) represented in the Cortes of Castilla–La Mancha, the regional legislature of the autonomous community of Castilla–La Mancha. The constituency currently elects five deputies. Its boundaries correspond to those of the Spanish province of Cuenca. The electoral system uses the D'Hondt method and closed-list proportional representation, with a minimum threshold of three percent.

== Electoral system ==
The constituency was created as per the Statute of Autonomy of Castilla–La Mancha of 1982 and was first contested in the 1983 regional election. The Statute provided for the five provinces in Castilla–La Mancha—Albacete, Ciudad Real, Cuenca, Guadalajara and Toledo—to be established as multi-member districts in the Cortes of Castilla–La Mancha, with this regulation being maintained under the 1986 regional electoral law. Each constituency is entitled to an initial minimum of three seats, with the remaining 18—22 from 1986 to 1998—being distributed in proportion to their populations. In 1983 and from 1998 to 2014, each constituency was allocated a fixed number of seats: 9 for Albacete (10 from 1998 to 2014), 10 for Ciudad Real (11 from 1998 to 2012; 12 until 2014), 8 for Cuenca (8 from 2012 to 2014), 7 for Guadalajara (8 from 2007 to 2012; 9 until 2014) and 10 for Toledo (11 from 1998 to 2007; 12 from 2007 to 2012; 13 until 2014).

Voting is on the basis of universal suffrage, which comprises all nationals over eighteen, registered in Castilla–La Mancha and in full enjoyment of their political rights. Amendments to the electoral law in 2011 required for Castilian-Manchegan people abroad to apply for voting before being permitted to vote, a system known as "begged" or expat vote (Spanish: Voto rogado) which was abolished in 2022. Seats are elected using the D'Hondt method and a closed list proportional representation, with an electoral threshold of three percent of valid votes—which includes blank ballots—being applied in each constituency. The only exception was in 1983, when a five percent threshold was applied regionally. The use of the D'Hondt method might result in a higher effective threshold, depending on the district magnitude.

The electoral law allows for parties and federations registered in the interior ministry, coalitions and groupings of electors to present lists of candidates. Parties and federations intending to form a coalition ahead of an election are required to inform the relevant Electoral Commission within ten days of the election call—fifteen before 1985—whereas groupings of electors need to secure the signature of at least one percent of the electorate in the constituencies for which they seek election—one-thousandth of the electorate, with a compulsory minimum of 500 signatures, until 1985—disallowing electors from signing for more than one list of candidates.

== Deputies ==
Deputies 1983–present
Key to parties PSOE PP CP AP
Cortes	Election	Distribution
1st	1983	4 / 4
2nd	1987	4 / 4
3rd	1991	5 / 3
4th	1995	4 / 4
5th	1999	4 / 4
6th	2003	5 / 3
7th	2007	4 / 4
8th	2011	4 / 4
9th	2015	2 / 3
10th	2019	3 / 2
11th	2023	3 / 2

== Regional elections ==
=== 2023 ===
Summary of the 28 May 2023 Cortes of Castilla–La Mancha election results in Cuenca
Parties and alliances	Popular vote			Seats	
Parties and alliances	Votes	%	±pp	Total	+/−
Spanish Socialist Workers' Party (PSOE)	53,531	47.41	+0.96	3	±0
People's Party (PP)	37,884	33.55	+0.77	2	±0
Vox (Vox)	11,816	10.47	+4.88	0	±0
United We Can Castilla–La Mancha (Unidas Podemos CLM)	3,624	3.21	–2.27	0	±0
+CUENCA Now–Empty Spain (+CU–EV)	1,984	1.76	New	0	±0
Citizens–Party of the Citizenry (CS)	771	0.68	–7.19	0	±0
Animalist Party with the Environment (PACMA)^{1}	645	0.57	+0.05	0	±0
Your Fatherland (TÚpatria)	585	0.52	New	0	±0
Castilian Party–Commoners' Land–Zero Cuts (PCAS–TC–RC)	155	0.14	+0.01	0	±0
Country with Managers (País con Gestores)	136	0.12	New	0	±0
Blank ballots	1,773	1.57	+0.60		
Total	112,904			5	±0
Valid votes	112,904	98.43	–0.45		
Invalid votes	1,804	1.57	+0.45		
Votes cast / turnout	114,708	74.74	–1.27		
Abstentions	38,766	25.26	+1.27		
Registered voters	153,474				
Sources
Footnotes: ^{1} Animalist Party with the Environment results are compared to Animalist Party Against Mistreatment of Animals totals in the 2019 election.

=== 2019 ===
Summary of the 26 May 2019 Cortes of Castilla–La Mancha election results in Cuenca
Parties and alliances	Popular vote			Seats	
Parties and alliances	Votes	%	±pp	Total	+/−
Spanish Socialist Workers' Party (PSOE)	54,160	46.45	+8.82	3	+1
People's Party (PP)	38,226	32.78	–8.74	2	–1
Citizens–Party of the Citizenry (Cs)	9,174	7.87	+1.21	0	±0
Vox (Vox)	6,521	5.59	+5.22	0	±0
United We Can–United Left–Equo CLM (Podemos–IU–Equo)^{1}	6,391	5.48	–4.61	0	±0
Animalist Party Against Mistreatment of Animals (PACMA)	607	0.52	+0.06	0	±0
Castilian Party–Commoners' Land (PCAS–TC)	156	0.13	–0.10	0	±0
For a Fairer World (PUM+J)	126	0.11	New	0	±0
Traditions and Rural World (ANATUR–UDEC)	113	0.10	New	0	±0
Blank ballots	1,130	0.97	–0.94		
Total	116,604			5	±0
Valid votes	116,604	98.88	+0.97		
Invalid votes	1,325	1.12	–0.97		
Votes cast / turnout	117,929	76.01	–0.73		
Abstentions	37,228	23.99	+0.73		
Registered voters	155,157				
Sources
Footnotes: ^{1} United We Can–United Left–Equo CLM results are compared to the combined totals of We Can and Let's Win Castilla–La Mancha–The Greens–United Left in the 2015 election.

=== 2015 ===
Summary of the 24 May 2015 Cortes of Castilla–La Mancha election results in Cuenca
Parties and alliances	Popular vote			Seats	
Parties and alliances	Votes	%	±pp	Total	+/−
People's Party (PP)	49,816	41.52	–5.92	3	–1
Spanish Socialist Workers' Party (PSOE)	45,151	37.63	–8.96	2	–2
We Can (Podemos)	9,566	7.97	New	0	±0
Citizens–Party of the Citizenry (C's)	7,997	6.66	New	0	±0
Let's Win Castilla–La Mancha–The Greens–United Left (Ganemos–LV–IU)^{1}	2,544	2.12	–0.48	0	±0
Union, Progress and Democracy (UPyD)	647	0.54	–0.82	0	±0
Animalist Party Against Mistreatment of Animals (PACMA)	549	0.46	New	0	±0
The Greens–Green Group (LV–GV)	439	0.37	New	0	±0
Vox (Vox)	439	0.37	New	0	±0
Union of Independent Citizens (UCIN)	273	0.23	New	0	±0
Castilian Party–Castilian Unity (PCAS–UdCa)^{2}	273	0.23	–0.18	0	±0
Blank ballots	2,293	1.91	+0.31		
Total	119,987			5	–3
Valid votes	119,987	97.91	–0.80		
Invalid votes	2,559	2.09	+0.80		
Votes cast / turnout	122,546	76.74	–4.55		
Abstentions	37,138	23.26	+4.55		
Registered voters	159,684				
Sources
Footnotes: ^{1} Let's Win Castilla–La Mancha–The Greens–United Left results are compared to United Left of Castilla–La Mancha totals in the 2011 election.; ^{2} Castilian Party–Castilian Unity results are compared to Castilian Party totals in the 2011 election.

=== 2011 ===
Summary of the 22 May 2011 Cortes of Castilla–La Mancha election results in Cuenca
Parties and alliances	Popular vote			Seats	
Parties and alliances	Votes	%	±pp	Total	+/−
People's Party (PP)	62,318	47.44	+2.77	4	±0
Spanish Socialist Workers' Party (PSOE)	61,196	46.59	–4.32	4	±0
United Left of Castilla–La Mancha (IUCLM)	3,409	2.60	–0.14	0	±0
Union, Progress and Democracy (UPyD)	1,784	1.36	New	0	±0
Castilian Party (PCAS)^{1}	540	0.41	–0.01	0	±0
Blank ballots	2,102	1.60	+0.34		
Total	131,349			8	±0
Valid votes	131,349	98.71	–0.38		
Invalid votes	1,714	1.29	+0.38		
Votes cast / turnout	133,063	81.29	+1.81		
Abstentions	30,635	18.71	–1.81		
Registered voters	163,698				
Sources
Footnotes: ^{1} Castilian Party results are compared to Commoners' Land totals in the 2007 election.

=== 2007 ===
Summary of the 27 May 2007 Cortes of Castilla–La Mancha election results in Cuenca
Parties and alliances	Popular vote			Seats	
Parties and alliances	Votes	%	±pp	Total	+/−
Spanish Socialist Workers' Party (PSOE)	66,164	50.91	–3.05	4	–1
People's Party (PP)	58,059	44.67	+3.98	4	+1
United Left–Left of Castilla–La Mancha (IU–ICAM)	3,557	2.74	–0.58	0	±0
Commoners' Land (TC)	543	0.42	+0.22	0	±0
Blank ballots	1,638	1.26	–0.17		
Total	129,961			8	±0
Valid votes	129,961	99.09	–0.02		
Invalid votes	1,196	0.91	+0.02		
Votes cast / turnout	131,157	79.48	–1.74		
Abstentions	33,871	20.52	+1.74		
Registered voters	165,028				

=== 2003 ===
Summary of the 25 May 2003 Cortes of Castilla–La Mancha election results in Cuenca
Parties and alliances	Popular vote			Seats	
Parties and alliances	Votes	%	±pp	Total	+/−
Spanish Socialist Workers' Party (PSOE)	71,909	53.96	+3.89	5	+1
People's Party (PP)	54,219	40.69	–3.84	3	–1
United Left–Left of Castilla–La Mancha (IU–ICAM)	2,872	2.16	–0.41	0	±0
Independents for Cuenca (ixC)	1,658	1.24	New	0	±0
Republican Left (IR)	272	0.20	New	0	±0
Commoners' Land–Castilian Nationalist Party (TC–PNC)	271	0.20	–0.23	0	±0
National Democracy (DN)	149	0.11	New	0	±0
Blank ballots	1,911	1.43	–0.06		
Total	133,261			8	±0
Valid votes	133,261	99.11	–0.01		
Invalid votes	1,199	0.89	+0.01		
Votes cast / turnout	134,460	81.22	+0.18		
Abstentions	31,083	18.78	–0.18		
Registered voters	165,543				

=== 1999 ===
Summary of the 13 June 1999 Cortes of Castilla–La Mancha election results in Cuenca
Parties and alliances	Popular vote			Seats	
Parties and alliances	Votes	%	±pp	Total	+/−
Spanish Socialist Workers' Party–Progressives (PSOE–p)	67,244	50.07	+4.35	4	±0
People's Party (PP)	59,809	44.53	–2.94	4	±0
United Left–Left of Castilla–La Mancha (IU–ICAM)	3,450	2.57	–2.09	0	±0
Centrist Union–Democratic and Social Centre (UC–CDS)	739	0.55	+0.03	0	±0
Commoners' Land–Castilian Nationalist Party (TC–PNC)	582	0.43	+0.16	0	±0
Spanish Phalanx of the CNSO (FE–JONS)	199	0.15	New	0	±0
Regionalist Party of Castilla–La Mancha (PRCM)	168	0.13	–0.09	0	±0
Humanist Party (PH)	123	0.09	New	0	±0
Blank ballots	1,995	1.49	+0.43		
Total	134,309			8	±0
Valid votes	134,309	99.12	–0.21		
Invalid votes	1,199	0.88	+0.21		
Votes cast / turnout	135,508	81.04	–1.33		
Abstentions	31,708	18.96	+1.33		
Registered voters	167,216				

=== 1995 ===
Summary of the 28 May 1995 Cortes of Castilla–La Mancha election results in Cuenca
Parties and alliances	Popular vote			Seats	
Parties and alliances	Votes	%	±pp	Total	+/−
People's Party (PP)	65,121	47.47	+7.67	4	+1
Spanish Socialist Workers' Party (PSOE)	62,718	45.72	–4.61	4	–1
United Left–Left of Castilla–La Mancha (IU–ICAM)	6,393	4.66	+1.34	0	±0
Democratic and Social Centre–Cuencan People's Union (CDS–UPCo)	720	0.52	–4.07	0	±0
Commoners' Land–Castilian Nationalist Party (TC–PNC)	374	0.27	–0.44	0	±0
Regionalist Party of Castilla–La Mancha (PRCM)	303	0.22	New	0	±0
Action for Talavera Region (ACTAL)	87	0.06	New	0	±0
Blank ballots	1,458	1.06	+0.04		
Total	137,174			8	±0
Valid votes	137,174	99.33	+0.05		
Invalid votes	922	0.67	–0.05		
Votes cast / turnout	138,096	82.37	+6.54		
Abstentions	29,560	17.63	–6.54		
Registered voters	167,656				

=== 1991 ===
Summary of the 26 May 1991 Cortes of Castilla–La Mancha election results in Cuenca
Parties and alliances	Popular vote			Seats	
Parties and alliances	Votes	%	±pp	Total	+/−
Spanish Socialist Workers' Party (PSOE)	64,828	50.33	+6.20	5	+1
People's Party (PP)^{1}	51,268	39.80	–2.37	3	–1
Democratic and Social Centre (CDS)	5,909	4.59	–4.12	0	±0
United Left (IU)	4,277	3.32	+0.74	0	±0
Commoners' Land (TC)	918	0.71	New	0	±0
Alliance for the Republic (AxR)	294	0.23	New	0	±0
Blank ballots	1,318	1.02	–0.06		
Total	128,812			8	±0
Valid votes	128,812	99.28	+0.47		
Invalid votes	930	0.72	–0.47		
Votes cast / turnout	129,742	75.83	–1.31		
Abstentions	41,348	24.17	+1.31		
Registered voters	171,090				
Sources
Footnotes: ^{1} People's Party results are compared to the combined totals of People's Alliance, People's Democratic Party and Liberal Party in the 1987 election.

=== 1987 ===
Summary of the 10 June 1987 Cortes of Castilla–La Mancha election results in Cuenca
Parties and alliances	Popular vote			Seats	
Parties and alliances	Votes	%	±pp	Total	+/−
Spanish Socialist Workers' Party (PSOE)	56,445	44.13	+2.28	4	±0
People's Alliance (AP)^{1}	48,731	38.10	–6.00	4	±0
Democratic and Social Centre (CDS)	11,142	8.71	+6.87	0	±0
People's Democratic Party (PDP)	3,750	2.93	New	0	±0
United Left (IU)^{2}	3,304	2.58	–2.89	0	±0
Liberal Party (PL)	1,459	1.14	New	0	±0
Workers' Party of Spain–Communist Unity (PTE–UC)	1,329	1.04	New	0	±0
Humanist Platform (PH)	360	0.28	New	0	±0
Blank ballots	1,384	1.08	+0.36		
Total	127,904			8	±0
Valid votes	127,904	98.81	+0.11		
Invalid votes	1,546	1.19	–0.11		
Votes cast / turnout	129,450	77.14	+1.88		
Abstentions	38,353	22.86	–1.88		
Registered voters	167,803				
Sources
Footnotes: ^{1} People's Alliance results are compared to People's Coalition totals in the 1983 election.; ^{2} United Left results are compared to Communist Party of Spain totals in the 1983 election.

=== 1983 ===
Summary of the 8 May 1983 Cortes of Castilla–La Mancha election results in Cuenca
Parties and alliances	Popular vote			Seats	
Parties and alliances	Votes	%	±pp	Total	+/−
People's Coalition (AP–PDP–UL)	54,080	44.10	n/a	4	n/a
Spanish Socialist Workers' Party (PSOE)	51,327	41.85	n/a	4	n/a
Liberal Democratic Party (PDL)	7,391	6.03	n/a	0	n/a
Communist Party of Spain (PCE)	6,706	5.47	n/a	0	n/a
Democratic and Social Centre (CDS)	2,259	1.84	n/a	0	n/a
Blank ballots	878	0.72	n/a		
Total	122,641			8	n/a
Valid votes	122,641	98.70	n/a		
Invalid votes	1,610	1.30	n/a		
Votes cast / turnout	124,251	75.26	n/a		
Abstentions	40,844	24.74	n/a		
Registered voters	165,095				
