= José María Barreda =

Spanish politician and historian

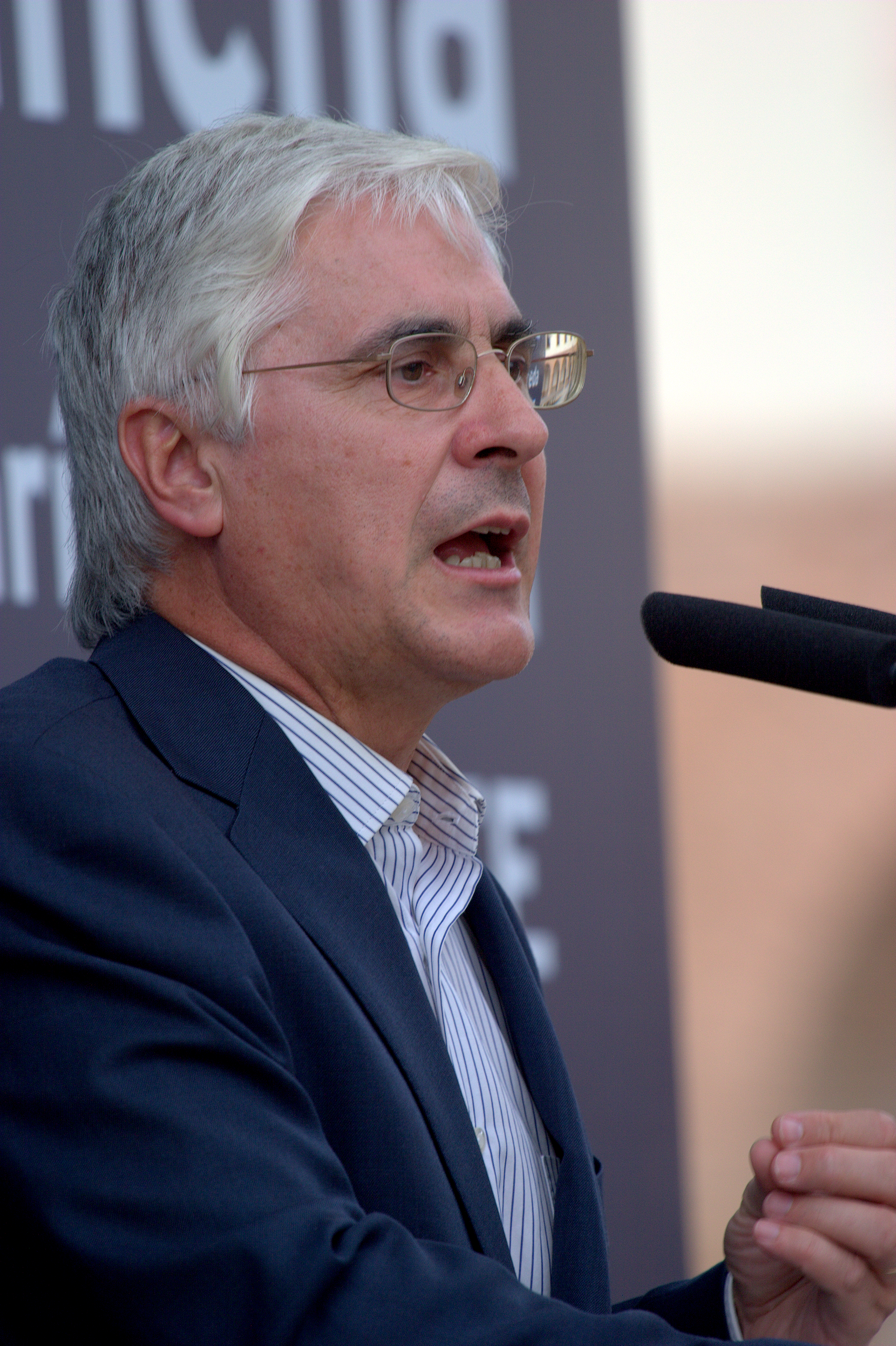

President of Castile-La Mancha
- In office 29 April 2004 – 22 June 2011
- Monarch: Juan Carlos I
- Preceded by: José Bono
- Succeeded by: María Dolores de Cospedal

President of the Cortes of Castile-La Mancha
- In office 21 June 1991 – 8 July 1997
- Preceded by: José Manuel Martínez Cenzano
- Succeeded by: María del Carmen Blázquez

Member of the Congress of Deputies
- Incumbent
- Assumed office 13 December 2011
- Constituency: Ciudad Real

Member of the Senate
- In office 21 November 1989 – 16 October 1991
- Constituency: Castile-La Mancha

Member of the Cortes of Castile-La Mancha
- In office 10 June 1987 – 9 December 2011
- Constituency: Ciudad Real; Toledo

Personal details
- Born: 4 February 1953 (age 73) Ciudad Real, Spain
- Party: Spanish Socialist Workers' Party

José María Barreda Fontes (born 4 February 1953) is a Spanish politician and historian. A member of the Spanish Socialist Workers' Party (PSOE), he served as President of the Junta of Communities of Castilla–La Mancha from 2004 until 2011. As of 2019, he works as senior lecturer of Contemporary History at the University of Castilla–La Mancha.

== Biography ==
Barreda, who was born in Ciudad Real, is a descendant of a Spanish noble family and holds a doctorate in history and geography and a BA in philosophy and letters from the Complutense University of Madrid. He received a scholarship from the Spanish National Research Council to fund his post-doctoral research and is currently a tenured professor of contemporary history at the University of Castile-La Mancha.

Barreda met his wife, Clementina Díez de Baldeón, a socialist deputy for the Province of Ciudad Real, while still at university; the couple have two children.

== Political career ==
Barreda's first elected position was to the municipal council of Ciudad Real, a post he held from 1983-1987. During that period, he was the Minister for Education and Culture in the first regional Government of José Bono. As a Minister, he oversaw the creation of the University of Castile-La Mancha, launched the regional network of libraries, cultural centres, theatres and auditoria, and organised the conversion of the library at the Alcázar of Toledo.

Barreda became the regional Minister for Institutional Relations in January 1988; he only held the portfolio for four months, however, as he became the region's vice-president in May of the same year. He served as vice-president until November 1989, when the Cortes of Castile-La Mancha—the regional parliament—appointed him to be one of the region's two representatives in the Spanish Senate. He returned to Castile-La Mancha in June 1991 to serve as the President of the Cortes Regionales. Barreda remained in the post until July 1997, when he was forced to resign following his appointment as the regional general-secretary of the Spanish Socialist Workers' Party. Following the 1999 regional elections, Barreda returned to his old post of vice-president of Castile-La Mancha.

== President of Castile-La Mancha ==
In April 2004, after more than 20 years as President of Castile-La Mancha, Bono was named as the Minister of Defence in José Luis Rodríguez Zapatero newly elected government. Barreda took over from Bono as President of Castile-La Mancha and was his party's candidate in the 2007 regional elections, where he retained his position, albeit with a reduced majority.

Political offices
Preceded by Vicente Acebedo Flórez	Regional Minister of Education and Culture of Castile-La Mancha; 1983–1987	Succeeded by Juan Sisino Pérez Garzón
Preceded by None	Vice President of Castile-La Mancha; 1988-1989	Succeeded by Fernando López Carrasco
Preceded by José Manuel Martínez Cenzano	President of the Cortes of Castile-La Mancha; 1991–1997	Succeeded by María del Carmen Blázquez
Preceded by Fernando López Carrasco	Vice President of Castile-La Mancha; 1999-2004	Succeeded by María Luisa Araújo
Preceded by Manuel Marín	President of Castile-La Mancha; 2004-2011	Succeeded by María Dolores de Cospedal
Party political offices
Preceded by Juan Pedro Hernández Moltó	Secretary-General of the PSOE-Castile-La Mancha; 1997-2012	Succeeded by Emiliano García-Page
