= Manuel Pérez Castell =

Spanish politician (1948–2024)

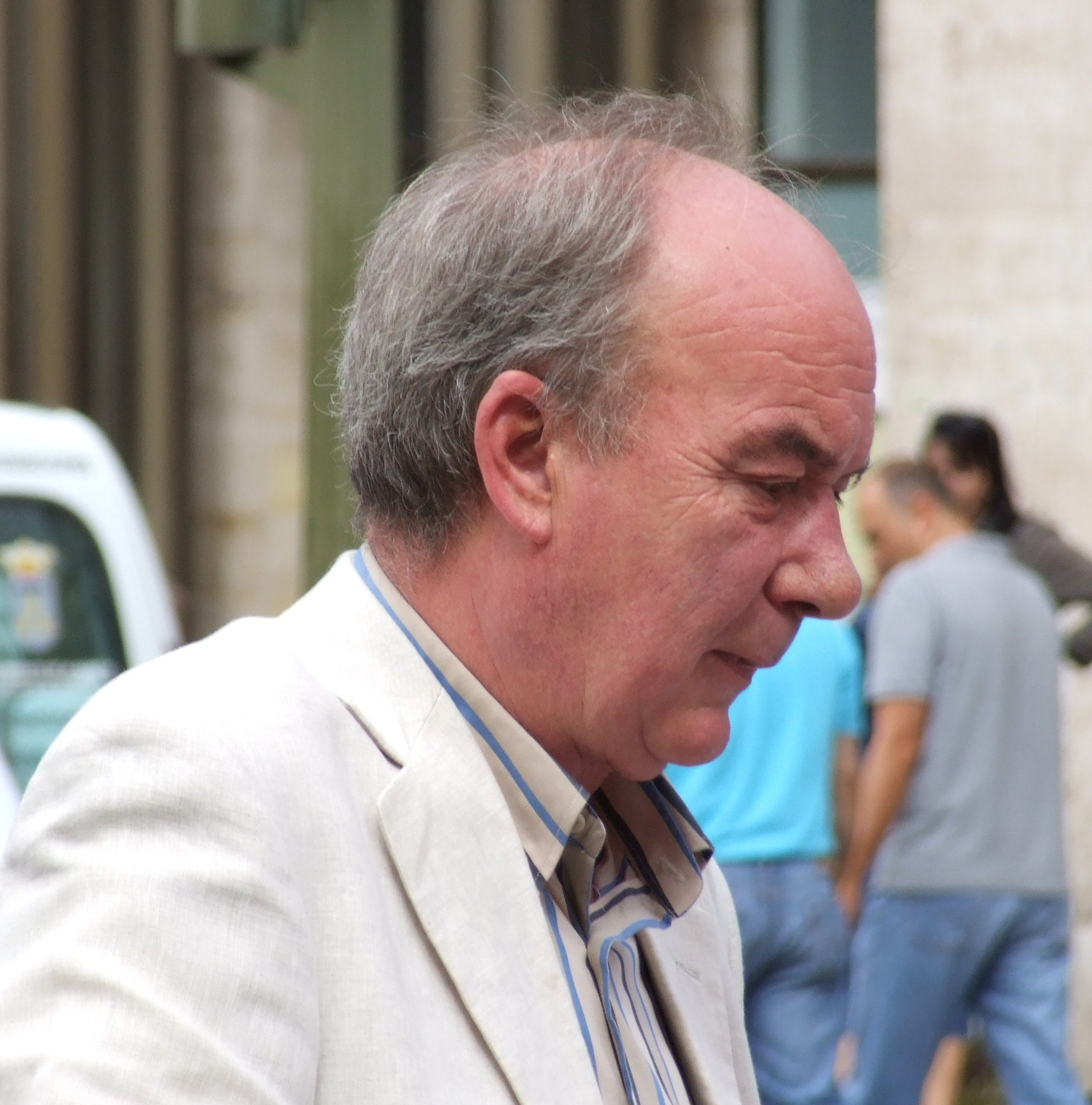
- Pérez in 2007

Member of the Congress of Deputies for Albacete
- In office 1 April 2008 – 20 November 2011

Mayor of Albacete
- In office 19 June 1999 – 16 June 2007
- Preceded by: Juan Garrido Herráez
- Succeeded by: Carmen Oliver Jaquero

Member of the Cortes of Castilla–La Mancha for Albacete
- In office 28 May 1995 – 13 June 1999

Personal details
- Born: 12 February 1948 Villahermosa, Spain
- Died: 21 August 2024 (aged 76) Albacete, Spain
- Party: PSCM-PSOE
- Education: Comillas Pontifical University
- Occupation: Academic

Manuel Pérez Castell (12 February 1948 – 21 August 2024) was a Spanish politician. A member of the Socialist Party of Castilla–La Mancha, he served in the Cortes of Castilla–La Mancha from 1995 to 1999, was mayor of Albacete from 1999 to 2007, and served in the Congress of Deputies from 2008 to 2011.

Pérez died in Albacete on 21 August 2024, at the age of 76.
