= Gonzalo Payo Subiza =

Spanish politician

- Born: 10 January 1931; Pulgar, Toledo, Spain
- Died: 13 August 2002 (aged 71); Toledo, Spain
- Education: University of Zaragoza
- Occupation: Politician
- Political party: Union of the Democratic Centre

Gonzalo Payo Subiza (10 January 1931 – 13 August 2002) was a Spanish politician from the Union of the Democratic Centre. He was elected deputy for Toledo to the first Congress of Deputies. He served as the second President of Castilla–La Mancha in 1982 before it gained autonomy.
