= José García Molina =

Spanish politician

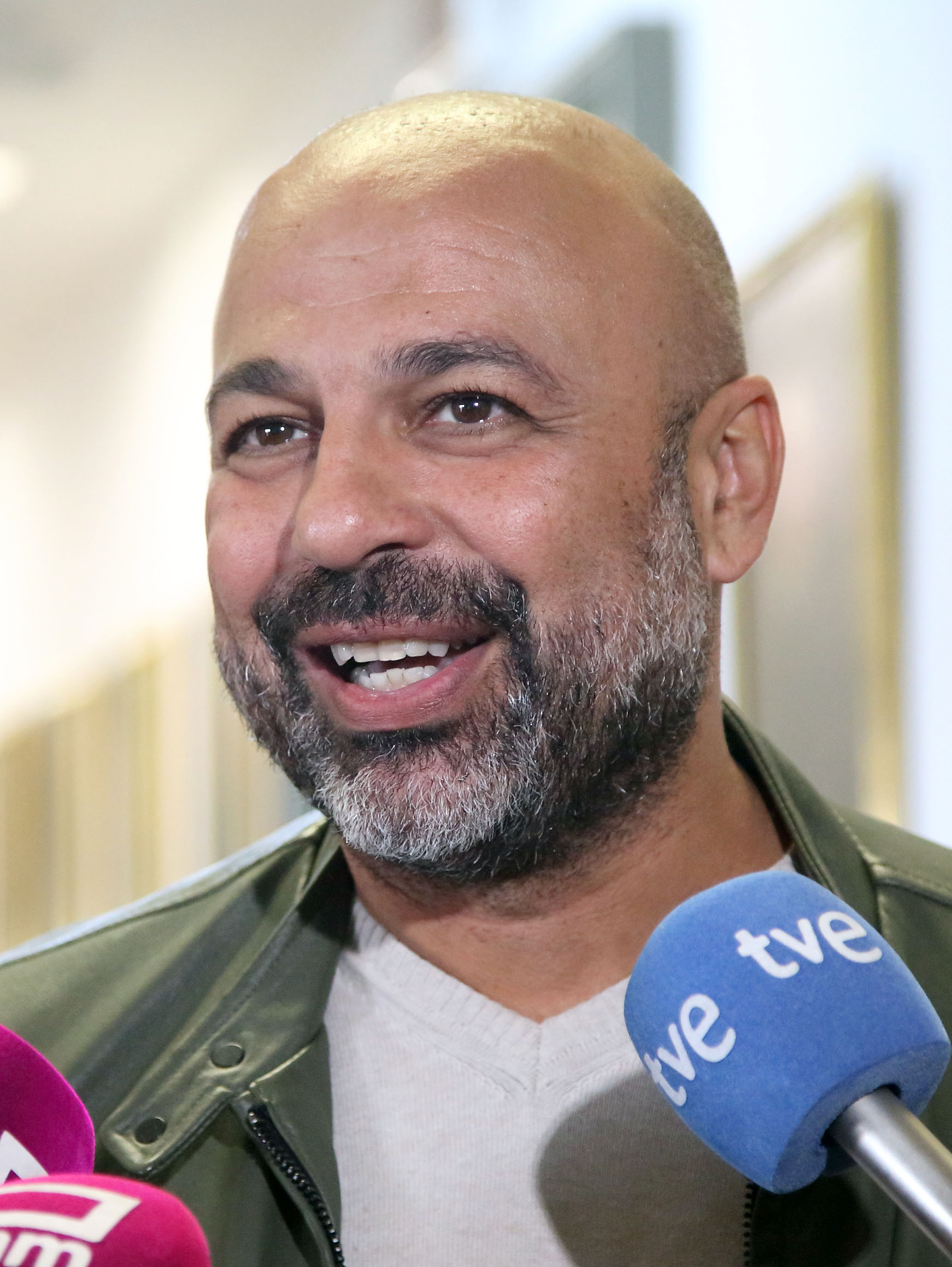

Second Vice President of the Junta of Communities of Castilla–La Mancha
- In office 10 August 2017 – 8 July 2019
- President: Emiliano García-Page
- Preceded by: None
- Succeeded by: Office disestablished

Personal details
- Born: José García Molina; 29 December 1969 (age 56) Barcelona, Catalonia, Spain
- Party: Podemos

José García Molina (born 29 December 1969) is a Spanish professor and politician from Podemos who served as Second Vice President of the Junta of Communities of Castilla–La Mancha from August 2017 to July 2019.
