= Guadalajara (Cortes of Castilla–La Mancha constituency) =

Coordinates: 40°50′N 2°30′W

- Cortes of Castilla–La Mancha; Electoral constituency
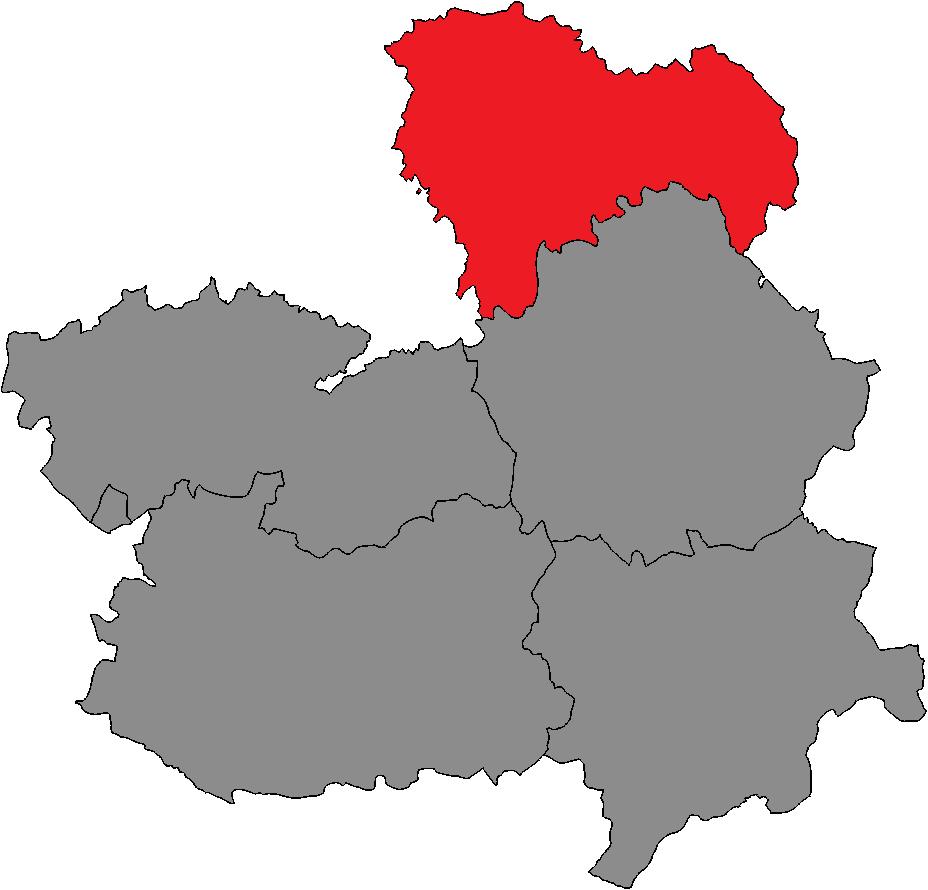
- Location of Guadalajara within Castilla–La Mancha
- Province: Guadalajara
- Autonomous community: Castilla–La Mancha
- Population: ▲279,860 (2024)
- Electorate: ▲196,733 (2023)
- Major settlements: Guadalajara

Current constituency
- Created: 1983
- Seats: 7 (1983–2007); 8 (2007–2012); 9 (2012–2014); 5 (2014–present)
- Members: PSOE (2); PP (2); Vox (1)

Guadalajara is one of the five constituencies (Spanish: circunscripciones) represented in the Cortes of Castilla–La Mancha, the regional legislature of the autonomous community of Castilla–La Mancha. The constituency currently elects five deputies. Its boundaries correspond to those of the Spanish province of Guadalajara. The electoral system uses the D'Hondt method and closed-list proportional representation, with a minimum threshold of three percent.

== Electoral system ==
The constituency was created as per the Statute of Autonomy of Castilla–La Mancha of 1982 and was first contested in the 1983 regional election. The Statute provided for the five provinces in Castilla–La Mancha—Albacete, Ciudad Real, Cuenca, Guadalajara and Toledo—to be established as multi-member districts in the Cortes of Castilla–La Mancha, with this regulation being maintained under the 1986 regional electoral law. Each constituency is entitled to an initial minimum of three seats, with the remaining 18—22 from 1986 to 1998—being distributed in proportion to their populations. In 1983 and from 1998 to 2014, each constituency was allocated a fixed number of seats: 9 for Albacete (10 from 1998 to 2014), 10 for Ciudad Real (11 from 1998 to 2012; 12 until 2014), 8 for Cuenca (8 from 2012 to 2014), 7 for Guadalajara (8 from 2007 to 2012; 9 until 2014) and 10 for Toledo (11 from 1998 to 2007; 12 from 2007 to 2012; 13 until 2014).

Voting is on the basis of universal suffrage, which comprises all nationals over eighteen, registered in Castilla–La Mancha and in full enjoyment of their political rights. Amendments to the electoral law in 2011 required for Castilian-Manchegan people abroad to apply for voting before being permitted to vote, a system known as "begged" or expat vote (Spanish: Voto rogado) which was abolished in 2022. Seats are elected using the D'Hondt method and a closed list proportional representation, with an electoral threshold of three percent of valid votes—which includes blank ballots—being applied in each constituency. The only exception was in 1983, when a five percent threshold was applied regionally. The use of the D'Hondt method might result in a higher effective threshold, depending on the district magnitude.

The electoral law allows for parties and federations registered in the interior ministry, coalitions and groupings of electors to present lists of candidates. Parties and federations intending to form a coalition ahead of an election are required to inform the relevant Electoral Commission within ten days of the election call—fifteen before 1985—whereas groupings of electors need to secure the signature of at least one percent of the electorate in the constituencies for which they seek election—one-thousandth of the electorate, with a compulsory minimum of 500 signatures, until 1985—disallowing electors from signing for more than one list of candidates.

== Deputies ==
Deputies 1983–present
Key to parties Podemos PSOE CDS Cs PP CP AP Vox
Cortes	Election	Distribution
1st	1983	3 / 4
2nd	1987	3 / 1 / 3
3rd	1991	3 / 4
4th	1995	3 / 4
5th	1999	4 / 3
6th	2003	4 / 3
7th	2007	3 / 4
8th	2011	3 / 5
9th	2015	1 / 2 / 2
10th	2019	3 / 1 / 1
11th	2023	2 / 2 / 1

== Regional elections ==
=== 2023 ===
Summary of the 28 May 2023 Cortes of Castilla–La Mancha election results in Guadalajara
Parties and alliances	Popular vote			Seats	
Parties and alliances	Votes	%	±pp	Total	+/−
Spanish Socialist Workers' Party (PSOE)	55,105	42.20	+2.64	2	–1
People's Party (PP)	39,528	30.27	+5.94	2	+1
Vox (Vox)	21,007	16.09	+6.56	1	+1
United We Can Castilla–La Mancha (Unidas Podemos CLM)	7,800	5.97	–3.39	0	±0
Animalist Party with the Environment (PACMA)^{1}	2,083	1.60	+0.31	0	±0
Citizens–Party of the Citizenry (CS)	1,650	1.26	–13.18	0	–1
Castilian Party–Commoners' Land–Zero Cuts (PCAS–TC–RC)	681	0.52	–0.04	0	±0
Country with Managers (País con Gestores)	432	0.33	New	0	±0
Spanish Phalanx of the CNSO (FE–JONS)	299	0.23	New	0	±0
Blank ballots	1,985	1.52	+0.81		
Total	130,570			5	±0
Valid votes	130,570	98.47	–0.66		
Invalid votes	2,034	1.53	+0.66		
Votes cast / turnout	132,604	67.40	–0.84		
Abstentions	64,129	32.60	+0.84		
Registered voters	196,733				
Sources
Footnotes: ^{1} Animalist Party with the Environment results are compared to Animalist Party Against Mistreatment of Animals totals in the 2019 election.

=== 2019 ===
Summary of the 26 May 2019 Cortes of Castilla–La Mancha election results in Guadalajara
Parties and alliances	Popular vote			Seats	
Parties and alliances	Votes	%	±pp	Total	+/−
Spanish Socialist Workers' Party (PSOE)	49,932	39.56	+9.55	3	+1
People's Party (PP)	30,704	24.33	–9.40	1	–1
Citizens–Party of the Citizenry (Cs)	18,220	14.44	+2.42	1	+1
Vox (Vox)	12,024	9.53	+8.56	0	±0
United We Can–United Left–Equo CLM (Podemos–IU–Equo)^{1}	11,808	9.36	–8.62	0	–1
Animalist Party Against Mistreatment of Animals (PACMA)	1,628	1.29	+0.16	0	±0
Castilian Party–Commoners' Land (PCAS–TC)	704	0.56	+0.29	0	±0
Traditions and Rural World (ANATUR–UDEC)	307	0.24	New	0	±0
Blank ballots	892	0.71	–1.12		
Total	126,219			5	±0
Valid votes	126,219	99.13	+0.89		
Invalid votes	1,102	0.87	–0.89		
Votes cast / turnout	127,321	68.24	–1.01		
Abstentions	59,250	31.76	+1.01		
Registered voters	186,571				
Sources
Footnotes: ^{1} United We Can–United Left–Equo CLM results are compared to the combined totals of We Can and Let's Win Castilla–La Mancha–The Greens–United Left in the 2015 election.

=== 2015 ===
Summary of the 24 May 2015 Cortes of Castilla–La Mancha election results in Guadalajara
Parties and alliances	Popular vote			Seats	
Parties and alliances	Votes	%	±pp	Total	+/−
People's Party (PP)	41,889	33.73	–16.10	2	–3
Spanish Socialist Workers' Party (PSOE)	37,269	30.01	–8.01	2	–1
We Can (Podemos)	18,171	14.63	New	1	+1
Citizens–Party of the Citizenry (C's)	14,923	12.02	New	0	±0
Let's Win Castilla–La Mancha–The Greens–United Left (Ganemos–LV–IU)^{1}	4,163	3.35	–1.36	0	±0
Union, Progress and Democracy (UPyD)	2,056	1.66	–1.34	0	±0
Animalist Party Against Mistreatment of Animals (PACMA)	1,406	1.13	+0.53	0	±0
Vox (Vox)	1,209	0.97	New	0	±0
Union of Independent Citizens (UCIN)	478	0.38	New	0	±0
Castilian Party–Castilian Unity (PCAS–UdCa)^{2}	341	0.27	–0.17	0	±0
Blank ballots	2,277	1.83	–0.28		
Total	124,182			5	–3
Valid votes	124,182	98.24	–0.21		
Invalid votes	2,224	1.76	+0.21		
Votes cast / turnout	126,406	69.25	–4.11		
Abstentions	56,136	30.75	+4.11		
Registered voters	182,542				
Sources
Footnotes: ^{1} Let's Win Castilla–La Mancha–The Greens–United Left results are compared to United Left of Castilla–La Mancha totals in the 2011 election.; ^{2} Castilian Party–Castilian Unity results are compared to Castilian Party totals in the 2011 election.

=== 2011 ===
Summary of the 22 May 2011 Cortes of Castilla–La Mancha election results in Guadalajara
Parties and alliances	Popular vote			Seats	
Parties and alliances	Votes	%	±pp	Total	+/−
People's Party (PP)	64,232	49.83	+3.28	5	+1
Spanish Socialist Workers' Party (PSOE)	49,011	38.02	–7.80	3	±0
United Left of Castilla–La Mancha (IUCLM)	6,076	4.71	+0.17	0	±0
Union, Progress and Democracy (UPyD)	3,862	3.00	New	0	±0
Ecolo–Greens Guadalajara (Ecolo–V)	1,673	1.30	New	0	±0
Anti-Bullfighting Party Against Mistreatment of Animals (PACMA)	777	0.60	New	0	±0
Castilian Party (PCAS)^{1}	567	0.44	–0.02	0	±0
Blank ballots	2,717	2.11	+0.43		
Total	128,915			8	+1
Valid votes	128,915	98.45	–0.80		
Invalid votes	2,034	1.55	+0.80		
Votes cast / turnout	130,949	73.36	+3.27		
Abstentions	47,562	26.64	–3.27		
Registered voters	178,511				
Sources
Footnotes: ^{1} Castilian Party results are compared to Commoners' Land totals in the 2007 election.

=== 2007 ===
Summary of the 27 May 2007 Cortes of Castilla–La Mancha election results in Guadalajara
Parties and alliances	Popular vote			Seats	
Parties and alliances	Votes	%	±pp	Total	+/−
People's Party (PP)	53,935	46.55	+7.19	4	+1
Spanish Socialist Workers' Party (PSOE)	53,086	45.82	–6.60	3	–1
United Left–Left of Castilla–La Mancha (IU–ICAM)	5,258	4.54	–0.04	0	±0
Regionalist Party of Guadalajara (PRGU)	619	0.53	+0.06	0	±0
Commoners' Land (TC)	532	0.46	+0.03	0	±0
The Phalanx (FE)	483	0.42	New	0	±0
Blank ballots	1,947	1.68	–0.12		
Total	115,860			7	±0
Valid votes	115,860	99.25	–0.09		
Invalid votes	880	0.75	+0.09		
Votes cast / turnout	116,740	70.09	–5.48		
Abstentions	49,818	29.91	+5.48		
Registered voters	166,558				

=== 2003 ===
Summary of the 25 May 2003 Cortes of Castilla–La Mancha election results in Guadalajara
Parties and alliances	Popular vote			Seats	
Parties and alliances	Votes	%	±pp	Total	+/−
Spanish Socialist Workers' Party (PSOE)	58,158	52.42	+5.01	4	±0
People's Party (PP)	43,673	39.36	–5.26	3	±0
United Left–Left of Castilla–La Mancha (IU–ICAM)	5,086	4.58	+0.28	0	±0
Regionalist Party of Guadalajara (PRGU)	517	0.47	–0.05	0	±0
Spanish Democratic Party (PADE)	498	0.45	New	0	±0
Commoners' Land–Castilian Nationalist Party (TC–PNC)	474	0.43	+0.16	0	±0
Authentic Phalanx (FA)	250	0.23	New	0	±0
Republican Left (IR)	195	0.18	New	0	±0
Castilian Left (IzCa)	99	0.09	New	0	±0
Blank ballots	2,001	1.80	–0.15		
Total	110,951			7	±0
Valid votes	110,951	99.34	+0.05		
Invalid votes	736	0.66	–0.05		
Votes cast / turnout	111,687	75.57	+2.92		
Abstentions	36,112	24.43	–2.92		
Registered voters	147,799				

=== 1999 ===
Summary of the 13 June 1999 Cortes of Castilla–La Mancha election results in Guadalajara
Parties and alliances	Popular vote			Seats	
Parties and alliances	Votes	%	±pp	Total	+/−
Spanish Socialist Workers' Party–Progressives (PSOE–p)	46,461	47.41	+9.55	4	+1
People's Party (PP)	43,729	44.62	–4.23	3	–1
United Left–Left of Castilla–La Mancha (IU–ICAM)	4,217	4.30	–5.25	0	±0
Regionalist Party of Guadalajara (PRGU)	512	0.52	–0.04	0	±0
Centrist Union–Democratic and Social Centre (UC–CDS)	335	0.34	–0.19	0	±0
Commoners' Land–Castilian Nationalist Party (TC–PNC)	266	0.27	+0.09	0	±0
Spanish Phalanx of the CNSO (FE–JONS)	199	0.20	+0.02	0	±0
Humanist Party (PH)	152	0.16	New	0	±0
Regionalist Party of Castilla–La Mancha (PRCM)	130	0.13	+0.02	0	±0
Party of Self-employed of Spain and Spanish Independent Groups (PAE–I)	88	0.09	New	0	±0
Blank ballots	1,908	1.95	+0.37		
Total	97,997			7	±0
Valid votes	97,997	99.29	–0.04		
Invalid votes	696	0.71	+0.04		
Votes cast / turnout	98,693	72.65	–5.03		
Abstentions	37,145	27.35	+5.03		
Registered voters	135,838				

=== 1995 ===
Summary of the 28 May 1995 Cortes of Castilla–La Mancha election results in Guadalajara
Parties and alliances	Popular vote			Seats	
Parties and alliances	Votes	%	±pp	Total	+/−
People's Party (PP)	47,169	48.85	+4.37	4	±0
Spanish Socialist Workers' Party (PSOE)	36,561	37.86	–3.06	3	±0
United Left–Left of Castilla–La Mancha (IU–ICAM)	9,226	9.55	+1.59	0	±0
Regionalist Party of Guadalajara (PRGU)	543	0.56	–0.36	0	±0
Guadalajara Independent Union (UIG)	513	0.53	New	0	±0
Centrist Union (UC)	513	0.53	–2.26	0	±0
Spanish Phalanx of the CNSO (FE–JONS)	171	0.18	New	0	±0
Commoners' Land–Castilian Nationalist Party (TC–PNC)	170	0.18	New	0	±0
Regionalist Party of Castilla–La Mancha (PRCM)	109	0.11	New	0	±0
Action for Talavera Region (ACTAL)	62	0.06	New	0	±0
Blank ballots	1,521	1.58	+0.15		
Total	96,558			7	±0
Valid votes	96,558	99.33	+0.29		
Invalid votes	655	0.67	–0.29		
Votes cast / turnout	97,213	77.68	+5.46		
Abstentions	27,938	22.32	–5.46		
Registered voters	125,151				

=== 1991 ===
Summary of the 26 May 1991 Cortes of Castilla–La Mancha election results in Guadalajara
Parties and alliances	Popular vote			Seats	
Parties and alliances	Votes	%	±pp	Total	+/−
People's Party (PP)^{1}	37,253	44.48	–0.20	4	+1
Spanish Socialist Workers' Party (PSOE)	34,273	40.92	+3.12	3	±0
United Left (IU)	6,670	7.96	+2.87	0	±0
Democratic and Social Centre (CDS)	2,336	2.79	–7.69	0	–1
The Greens Ecologist–Humanist List (LVLE–H)^{2}	1,113	1.33	+0.72	0	±0
Regionalist Party of Guadalajara (PRGU)	769	0.92	New	0	±0
Social Democratic Party of Castilla–La Mancha (PSDCLM)	143	0.17	New	0	±0
Blank ballots	1,198	1.43	+0.09		
Total	83,755			7	±0
Valid votes	83,755	99.04	+0.51		
Invalid votes	812	0.96	–0.51		
Votes cast / turnout	84,567	72.22	–4.85		
Abstentions	32,527	27.78	+4.85		
Registered voters	117,094				
Sources
Footnotes: ^{1} People's Party results are compared to the combined totals of People's Alliance and People's Democratic Party in the 1987 election.; ^{2} The Greens Ecologist–Humanist List results are compared to Humanist Platform totals in the 1987 election.

=== 1987 ===
Summary of the 10 June 1987 Cortes of Castilla–La Mancha election results in Guadalajara
Parties and alliances	Popular vote			Seats	
Parties and alliances	Votes	%	±pp	Total	+/−
People's Alliance (AP)^{1}	35,900	41.69	–4.47	3	–1
Spanish Socialist Workers' Party (PSOE)	32,549	37.80	–1.88	3	±0
Democratic and Social Centre (CDS)	9,021	10.48	+6.21	1	+1
United Left (IU)^{2}	4,382	5.09	–2.05	0	±0
People's Democratic Party (PDP)	2,571	2.99	New	0	±0
Humanist Platform (PH)	526	0.61	New	0	±0
Blank ballots	1,154	1.34	+0.48		
Total	86,103			7	±0
Valid votes	86,103	98.53	+0.08		
Invalid votes	1,281	1.47	–0.08		
Votes cast / turnout	87,384	77.07	+2.59		
Abstentions	25,997	22.93	–2.59		
Registered voters	113,381				
Sources
Footnotes: ^{1} People's Alliance results are compared to People's Coalition totals in the 1983 election.; ^{2} United Left results are compared to Communist Party of Spain totals in the 1983 election.

=== 1983 ===
Summary of the 8 May 1983 Cortes of Castilla–La Mancha election results in Guadalajara
Parties and alliances	Popular vote			Seats	
Parties and alliances	Votes	%	±pp	Total	+/−
People's Coalition (AP–PDP–UL)	37,342	46.16	n/a	4	n/a
Spanish Socialist Workers' Party (PSOE)	32,099	39.68	n/a	3	n/a
Communist Party of Spain (PCE)	5,775	7.14	n/a	0	n/a
Democratic and Social Centre (CDS)	3,454	4.27	n/a	0	n/a
Liberal Democratic Party (PDL)	1,541	1.90	n/a	0	n/a
Blank ballots	692	0.86	n/a		
Total	80,903			7	n/a
Valid votes	80,903	98.45	n/a		
Invalid votes	1,271	1.55	n/a		
Votes cast / turnout	82,174	74.48	n/a		
Abstentions	28,151	25.52	n/a		
Registered voters	110,325				
