= Manuel Marín =

Spanish politician (1949–2017)

The Most Excellent Manuel Marín
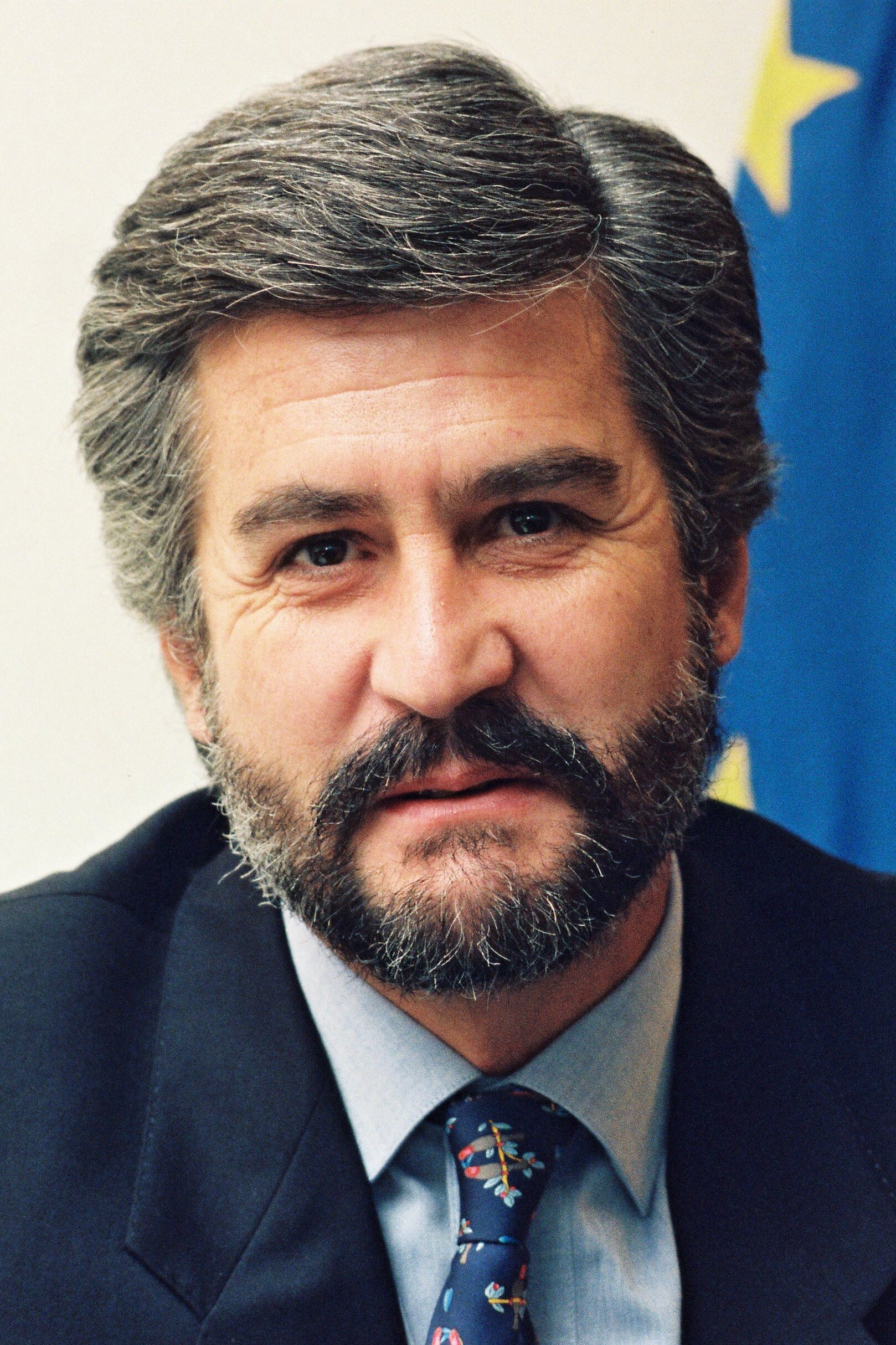
- Marín in 1995

Acting President of the European Commission
- In office 15 March 1999 – 15 September 1999
- Vice President: Leon Brittan
- Preceded by: Jacques Santer
- Succeeded by: Romano Prodi

President of the Congress of Deputies
- In office 8 April 2004 – 31 March 2008
- Preceded by: Luisa Fernanda Rudi
- Succeeded by: José Bono

European Commissioner for External Relations
- In office 23 January 1995 – 15 September 1999
- President: Jacques Santer; Himself (Acting)
- Preceded by: Hans van den Broek
- Succeeded by: Chris Patten

Member of the Congress of Deputies
- In office 3 March 2000 – 9 March 2008
- In office 15 June 1977 – 29 June 1986

Personal details
- Born: Manuel Marín González; 21 October 1949 Ciudad Real, Spain
- Died: 4 December 2017 (aged 68) Madrid, Spain
- Party: Socialist Workers' Party

Manuel Marín González (21 October 1949 – 4 December 2017) was a Spanish politician, former President of the Congress of Deputies of Spain. He was a long-time member of the European Commission, and acting president during the Santer Commission following the resignation of Jacques Santer. He is considered the father of the Erasmus Programme.

== Early life and introduction to politics ==
Marín was born in Ciudad Real. He studied law at Madrid's Complutense University, then went on to take a Diploma in European Community Law at Nancy University, France, and the Certificate of Advanced European Studies at the College of Europe, Bruges, Belgium. As from 1974 he was already a member of the Spanish Socialist Workers' Party (the PSOE) and in that connection he was elected in 1977 to the Spanish Congress of Deputies, and re-elected in 1979 and 1982, representing Ciudad Real Province. It is in this context that his interest in European affairs began to show. During this period in the Congress, he was a member of both the Defence and Foreign Affairs Committees of the Congress and became Spokesman for the PSOE in the Foreign Affairs Committee. He also became International Policy Secretary of the Federal Committee of the PSOE and vice-chair of the Union of Socialist Parties of the European Community, as well as being a member of the Parliamentary Assembly of the Council of Europe from 1 January 1978 to 1 April 1983.

== European politics ==
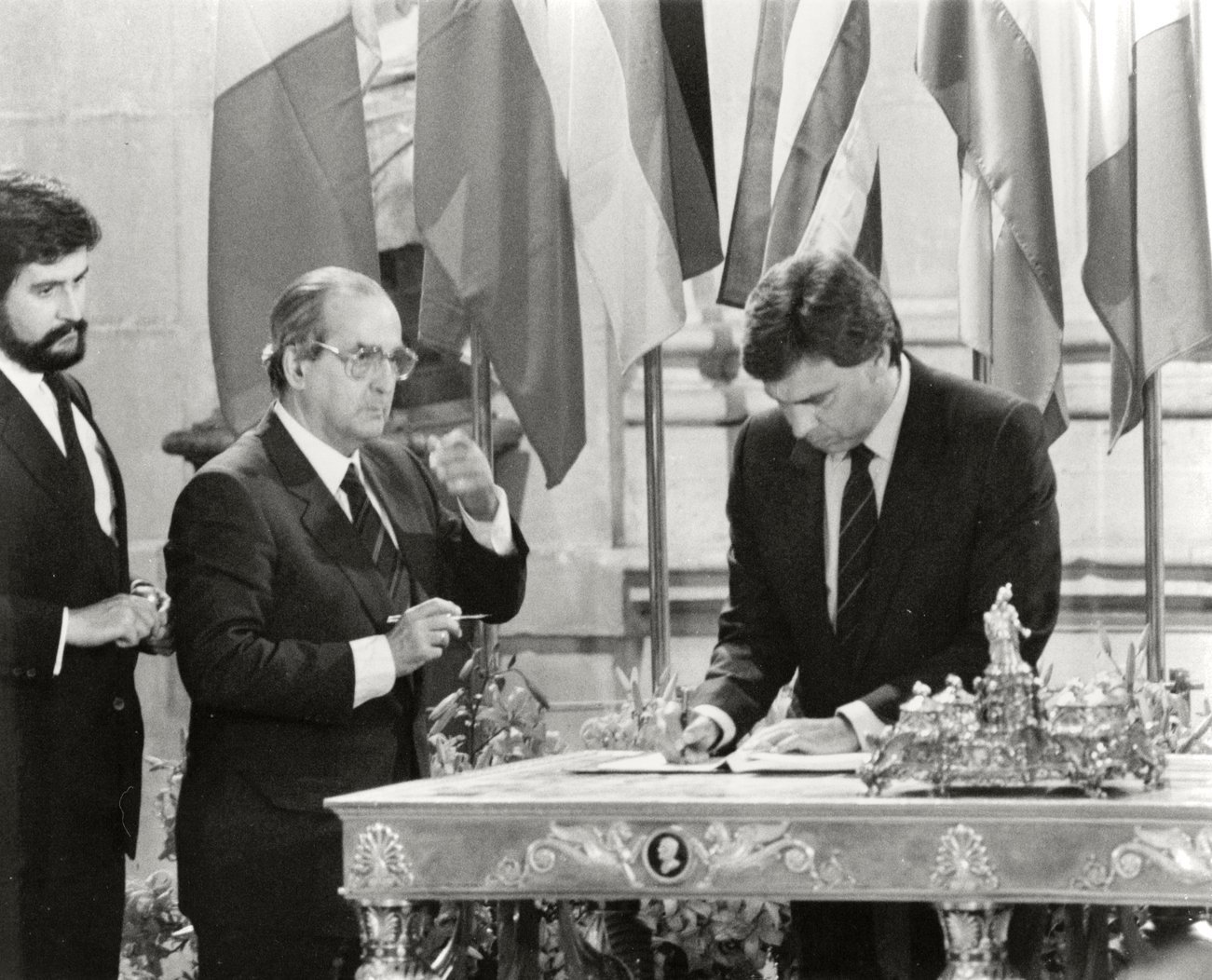
Manuel Marín and Fernando Morán watch Prime Minister Felipe González signing the Treaty of Accession of Spain to the EU in the Royal Palace on 12 June 1985

Following the Socialist success in the Spanish general elections of 1982 Marín joined the government as State Secretary for Relations with the European Communities – effectively, as Chief Negotiator for Spain's admission to the European Communities, a politically visible appointment because successful negotiations were seen as a seal of approval of Spain's transition from a dictatorship under Franco to a genuine parliamentary democracy. In this sense, the clear victory of the PSOE in the 1982 elections demonstrated the political maturity of the country, and gave Marín the political cards needed to demonstrate the importance, both to Spain and to Europe more widely, of Spanish membership.

The negotiations were successful, and on 1 January Spain joined the European Community at the same time as Portugal. Marín was nominated as Spain's first member of the European Commission and major Commissioner (larger countries at that time nominated two European Commissioners, generally one from the governing party and one from the Opposition); he was appointed a vice-president of the European Commission, which was the first Commission presided over by Jacques Delors. Marín was given the portfolio of Social Affairs, Education and Employment – subjects which until his arrival (the mandate of the first Delors Commission had begun the previous year in 1985) had been handled by Peter Sutherland. Although Marín was responsible for a number of important initiatives (for example, he was the Commissioner responsible for the presentation of the proposal for the Erasmus Programme, which still runs today and has acquired iconic status as a symbol of European integration), in many ways his initial priority was the successful integration of Spain into the life of the European Communities.

Marín was reappointed into the second Delors Commission from 1989 to 1992, again as vice-president but this time with a portfolio which interested him more: development cooperation and the Common Fisheries Policy. Although these two may seem very disparate, the link between them lies in the fact that the fishing fleets of European Community Member States fished traditionally in the waters of many developing countries (in particular, the substantial Spanish fishing fleet did so) and in this period negotiations over compensation to those developing countries became inevitably linked to the European Community's wider development policy. During this mandate, Marín interested himself in relations with Africa and travelled widely there.

Marín was appointed in due course to the third Delors Commission (1993–1994) with responsibility for development and cooperation, economic external relations with southern Mediterranean countries, Latin America, Asia, African, Caribbean and Pacific countries, and humanitarian aid.

Marín's final term in the European Commission was in the Santer Commission from 1995 until 1999. Among the changes brought by the Maastricht Treaty was the election of Commission Vice-presidents by Commission members (they had formerly been nominated by European Community Governments jointly). Marín was one in a field of four candidates for two vice-president posts, and was elected behind Leon Brittan, defeating Édith Cresson and Martin Bangemann. His initial portfolio in this mandate was External relations with Southern Mediterranean countries, the Middle East, Latin America and Asia (except Japan, China, South Korea, Hong Kong, Macao and Taiwan) including development aid; in this period difficulties in implementing the EU's "Mediterranean strategy" under his leadership began to lead to complaints -never confirmed- of incompetence and of fraud.

In late 1998 charges of incompetence, cronyism, nepotism and fraud against the European Commission increased. President Jacques Santer fought off an attempt to dismiss the commission, but in January 1999 had to agree to the appointment of a so-called Committee of Independent Experts to examine the commission's accounts. Following the biting report of the group, which (among other things) criticised Marín for his lack of responsibility, the Santer Commission resigned en bloc on 15 March 1999.

Marín's role in the downfall of the Santer Commission is still not clear. He has been strongly attacked without clear evidence for cronyism and nepotism in the European Parliament. But the Group of Experts largely cleared most members aside Cresson.

After the resignation of the Santer Commission, Marín took over as interim President. Marín was charged with the interim presidency of the commission on a "care and maintenance" basis until a new Commission could be appointed. The Prodi Commission was eventually appointed in September of that year.

== Return to domestic politics ==
Following the appointment of the Prodi Commission Marín returned to Spain. He was elected in Ciudad Real for the PSOE in the general elections of 12 March 2000 and 14 March 2004. Following the latter he was elected as Speaker of the Spanish Congress of Deputies. He was also a member of the Global Commission on International Migration.

== Personal life ==
Manuel Marín was married with two children. He died in Madrid on 4 December 2017 at the age of 68 from lung cancer.

Political offices
New office	Spanish European Commissioner; 1986–1999; Served alongside: Abel Matutes, Marcelino Oreja	Succeeded by Loyola de Palacio
Preceded by Hans van den Broek	European Commissioner for External Relations; 1995–1999	Succeeded by Chris Patten
Preceded by Jacques Santer	President of the European Commission; Acting; 1999	Succeeded by Romano Prodi
Preceded by Luisa Fernanda Rudi	President of the Congress of Deputies; 2004–2008	Succeeded by José Bono
