= Emiliano García-Page =

Spanish politician (born 1968)

The Most Excellent Emiliano García-Page
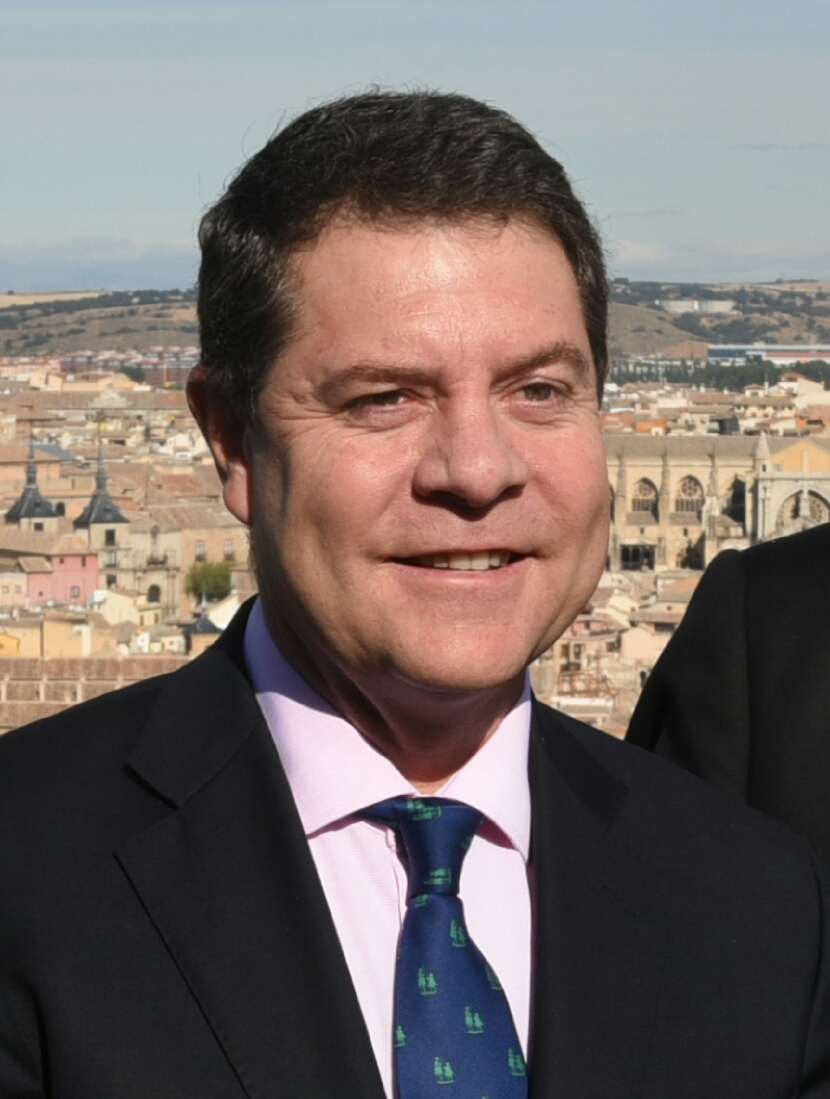

President of Castile-La Mancha
- Incumbent
- Assumed office 4 July 2015
- Monarch: Felipe VI
- Preceded by: María Dolores de Cospedal

Personal details
- Born: Emiliano García-Page Sánchez; 11 June 1968 (age 58) Toledo, Spain
- Party: Spanish Socialist Workers' Party
- Education: University of Castilla-La Mancha

Emiliano García-Page Sánchez (born 11 June 1968) is a Spanish politician from the Spanish Socialist Workers' Party who has been the President of Castile-La Mancha since 2015.

== Life ==
Emiliano was born on 11 June 1968 in Toledo, Spain. He has 2 children.

== Career ==
García-Page was the Mayor of Toledo from 2007 to 2015; after the 2015 city council election, he was succeeded in the position by Milagros Tolón.

Political offices
Preceded by Isidro Hernández Perlines	Councillor for Public Works of Castile-La Mancha; 1997-1998	Succeeded by Araceli Muñoz de Pedro
Preceded by Santiago Moreno González	Councillor for Welfare of Castile-La Mancha; 1999-2000	Succeeded by Tomás Mañas González
Preceded by Office created	Second Vice President of Castile-La Mancha; 2005-2007	Succeeded by María Luisa Araújo
Preceded by José Manuel Molina	Mayor of Toledo; 2007-2015	Succeeded by Milagros Tolón
Preceded by María Dolores de Cospedal	President of Castile-La Mancha; 2015–present	Succeeded by Incumbent
Party political offices
Preceded by Francisco Belmonte	Leader of the Socialist Group en the Cortes of Castile-La Mancha; 2000-2001	Succeeded by Francisco Belmonte
Preceded by José María Barreda	Secretary-General of the Socialist Workers' Party of Castile-La Mancha; 2012–present	Succeeded by Incumbent
