= President (Autonomous Community of Spain) =

Heads of government of each Spanish Autonomous Community

In Spain, a president of an Autonomous Community (Note: In the Basque Country, the head of government is officially known as lehendakari in Basque, or by the Spanish rendering of the title, lendakari.) (Note: "Autonomic president", "regional president", or simply "president" (in Spanish: presidente autonómico, presidente regional, or simply presidente; in Catalan/Valencian: president autonòmic, president regional, or simply president; in Galician: presidente autonómico, presidente rexional, or simply presidente). In the Basque language lehendakari is not translated.) serves as the chief executive officer in each of the seventeen Autonomous communities and in the two Autonomous cities, where they receive the name of "Mayor-Presidents". As such, regional presidents are responsible for implementing regional laws and overseeing the operation of the state executive branch. As regional leaders, governors advance and pursue new and revised policies and programs using a variety of tools, among them executive laws, executive budgets, and legislative proposals.

The figure of a vice-president is not regulated, and as such, each regional president can decide whether to appoint them or not.

== Role and powers ==
Autonomous communities in Spain have their own set of devolved powers; typically those communities with stronger local nationalism have more powers, and this type of devolution has been called asymmetrical. Some scholars have referred to the resulting system as a federal system in all but name, or a "federation without federalism". Spain is not a federation, but a decentralized unitary state. While sovereignty is vested in the nation as a whole, represented in the central institutions of government, the nation has, in variable degrees, devolved power to the communities, which, in turn, exercise their right to self-government within the limits set forth in the constitution and their autonomous statutes.

Each Autonomous community has its own Statute of Autonomy, and government, consisting of three branches: executive, legislative, and judicial.

The president heads the government's executive branch in each Autonomous community or city and has control over government budgeting and a role in legislation. Spanish regional presidents do not have term limits and as such, they can serve indefinitely.

All regional presidents are indirectly elected, as it is the role of the regional parliaments to appoint them following regional elections, if they can command a majority.

Presidents of Andalusia, the Basque Country, Catalonia and Galicia, whose Statutes of Autonomy and election laws were created by a special fast procedure, can also select the actual election date and trigger snap elections, and have frequently done so, particularly in the Basque Country and Catalonia. The Andalusian elections are usually set to coincide with the Spanish general elections, but again, there is no requisite to that effect in the Andalusian legislation. In the rest of Autonomies, elections are fixed to a certain common date, which is currently "the fourth Sunday of May each four years".

== Current composition ==
Autonomous community	President	Party/Alliance	Since
Andalusia	Juan Manuel Moreno	People's Party	18 January 2019
Aragon	Jorge Azcón	People's Party	11 August 2023
Asturias	Adrián Barbón	Spanish Socialist Workers' Party	20 July 2019
Balearic Islands	Marga Prohens	People's Party	6 July 2023
Basque Country	Imanol Pradales	Basque Nationalist Party	22 June 2024
Canary Islands	Fernando Clavijo	Canarian Coalition	12 July 2023
Cantabria	María José Sáenz de Buruaga	People's Party	4 July 2023
Castile and León	Alfonso Fernández Mañueco	People's Party	12 July 2019
Castilla–La Mancha	Emiliano García-Page	Spanish Socialist Workers' Party	4 July 2015
Catalonia	Salvador Illa	Socialists' Party of Catalonia	10 August 2024
Ceuta	Juan Jesús Vivas	People's Party	6 February 2001
Extremadura	María Guardiola	People's Party	14 July 2023
Galicia	Alfonso Rueda	People's Party	13 May 2022
La Rioja	Gonzalo Capellán	People's Party	28 June 2023
Madrid	Isabel Díaz Ayuso	People's Party	17 August 2019
Melilla	Juan José Imbroda	People's Party	7 July 2023
Murcia	Fernando López Miras	People's Party	2 May 2017
Navarre	María Chivite	Spanish Socialist Workers' Party	6 August 2019
Valencian Community	Juanfran Pérez Llorca	People's Party	2 December 2025

== Demographics ==
=== Party ===
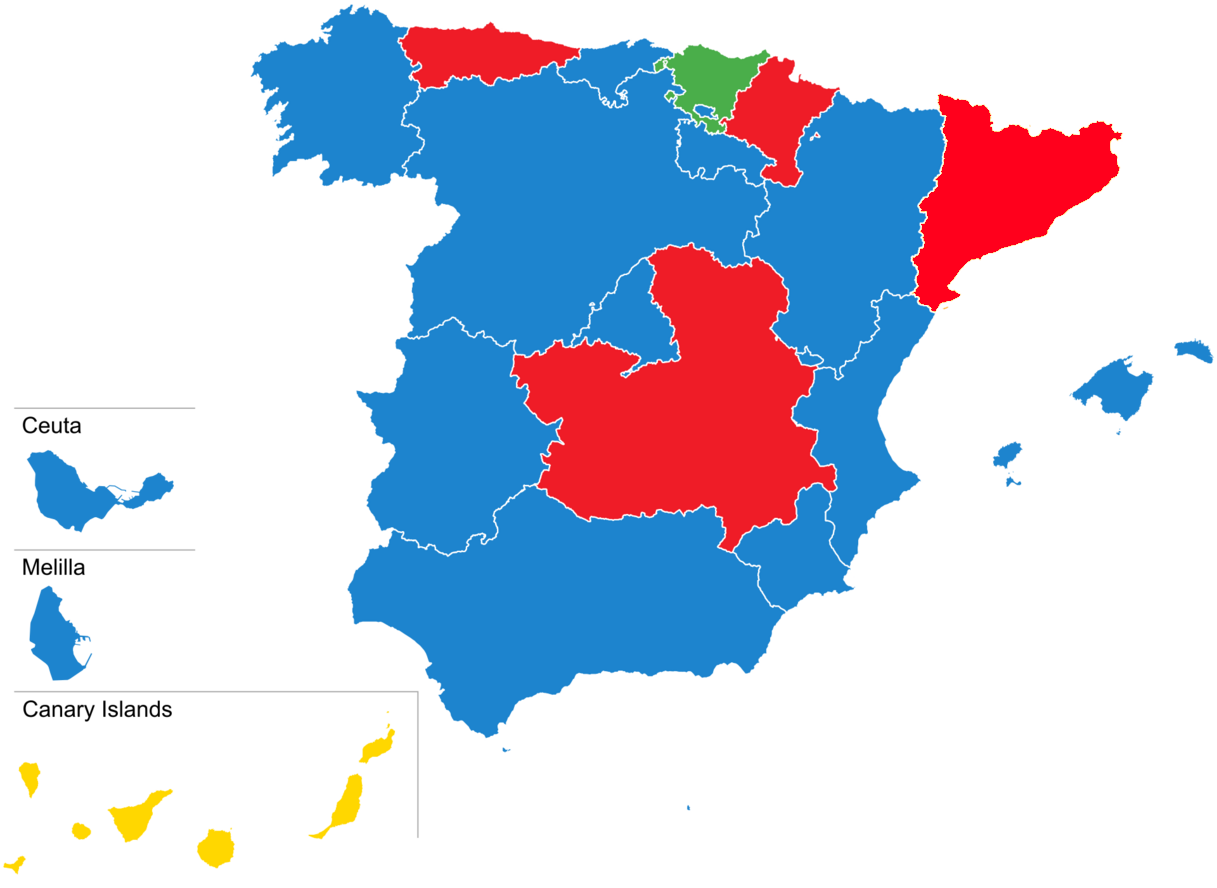
Party affiliation of current Spanish regional presidents: PSOE PP CC PNV

There are currently 13 Autonomous communities and cities with a People's Party president, 4 Autonomous communities with a Socialist president and 2 with regionalist or nationalist presidents.

=== Tenure ===
For each term, presidents serve four years in office. All members of regional parliaments are elected for four-year terms, but the president of the community has the faculty to dissolve the legislature and call for early elections. Nonetheless, in all communities except for the Basque Country, Catalonia, Galicia, and Andalusia elections are held the last Sunday of May every four years, concurrent with municipal elections in all Spain.

The longest-serving current and continuously president is Emiliano García-Page from Castilla-La Mancha, serving since July 2015.

The longest-serving regional president of all time was Juan Carlos Rodríguez Ibarra of Extremadura, who was elected in 1983 and lasted until 2007, when he returned to his position as professor in the University of Extremadura.

The shortest-serving president of all time was Antonio Rodríguez Basulto of La Rioja, who served for 126 days between January 25 and May 30, 1983.

=== Age ===
The oldest current regional president is Alfonso Fernández Mañueco from Castile and León, born in April 29, 1965 (age 61). The youngest current regional president is Fernando López Miras of the Region of Murcia who was born on October 4, 1983 (age 43).

The youngest regional president to serve was Joan Lerma of the Valencian Community (born in 1951), who became President of the Valencian government in 1982, at the age of 31.

=== Gender ===
As of July 2023, there are 14 male regional presidents and 5 female regional presidents: Marga Prohens of the Balearic Islands, María Guardiola of Extremadura, Isabel Díaz Ayuso of the Community of Madrid, María José Sáenz de Buruaga of Cantabria and María Chivite of Navarre. Of those, Chivite belongs to the social-democratic Spanish Socialist Workers' Party, while Prohens, Guardiola, Sáenz de Buruaga and Díaz Ayuso are from the conservative People's Party.

Seventeen women have served or are currently serving as regional presidents, including three in an acting capacity. Asturias, the Basque Country, the Canary Islands, Castile and León, Catalonia, Ceuta, Galicia, Melilla and the Valencian Community have never had a female regional president.

The first female regional president was María Antonia Martínez García of the Region of Murcia, who was elected on May 3, 1993, succeeding Carlos Collado Mena.

The Region of Murcia is the only Autonomous community to have had female regional presidents from both major parties, although conservative María Dolores Pagán Arce served only in the acting capacity for a short time. Navarre was the first region where a woman followed another woman as regional president, with Uxue Barkos succeeding Yolanda Barcina (they were from different parties). Uxue Barkos was also succeeded by another woman, current President María Chivite. The Community of Madrid and Navarre have had the most female regional presidents with a total of three, and Navarre is also the first region to have three women in a row serve as president.

The total of five female regional presidents serving from June 25 to July 1, 2015 and since July 14, 2023 at the same time is the current record in Spain.

=== LGBT status ===
There is currently one regional LGBT president, Adrián Barbón from Asturias. In addition, former president of the Canary Islands Jerónimo Saavedra, recognized his homosexuality years after leaving the position. At the moment they are the only presidents or former regional presidents to have declared so.

=== Birthplace ===
As no region has laws that establish the need to be born in the region in order to reach the presidency, 21 of the regional presidents were born outside the Autonomous community where they served:

- Andalusia: Manuel Chaves (Ceuta), José Antonio Griñán (Madrid) and Juan Manuel Moreno (Catalonia).
- Aragon: Hipólito Gómez de las Roces and Emilio Eiroa (Asturias) and Luisa Fernanda Rudi (Andalusia).
- Asturias: Juan Luis Rodríguez-Vigil (Castilla-La Mancha) and Francisco Álvarez-Cascos (Madrid).
- Balearic Islands: José Ramón Bauzá (Madrid).
- Canary Islands: Lorenzo Olarte (Galicia).
- Cantabria: José Joaquín Martínez (Basque Country).
- Castile and León: José María Aznar (Madrid).
- (Castilla–La Mancha) Castilla-La Mancha: María Dolores de Cospedal (Madrid).
- Catalonia: José Montilla (Andalusia).
- Community of Madrid: Joaquín Leguina (Cantabria).
- Region of Murcia: Pedro Antonio Sánchez (La Rioja).
- Navarre: Yolanda Barcina (Castile and León).
- Valencian Community: Eduardo Zaplana (Murcia) and Jose Luis Olivas (Castilla-La Mancha).

Juan Manuel Moreno (Andalusia) is the only current regional president born outside of the Autonomous community he governs.

Apart from those, Francesc Antich Oliver, from the Balearic Islands, was born in Caracas, Venezuela, although he holds Spanish nationality, and Carlos Collado Mena, from Murcia, was born in Orléans, France, from exiled Spaniards during the Spanish Civil War.

=== Religion ===
Although Spain is a still predominantly Catholic country, the latest studies show an increasing decline of religious beliefs in Spanish society, with the latest CIS study conducted in May 2021 indicating that compared to 58.2% of the Spanish population that declare themselves Catholic, 37.5% declare themselves either atheist, agnostic or non-believer. Currently, the presidents of Andalusia, Asturias, the Basque Country, Extremadura, Galicia and Murcia declare themselves as Catholics, while the presidents of Aragon, the Balearic Islands, Cantabria, Catalonia and the Community of Madrid declare themselves to be either atheist or non-believers.

== Salary ==
The highest salary currently being accepted is that of Catalan President Salvador Illa at €136,177.50. The lowest salary is that of Cantabrian President María José Sainz de Buruaga at €65,555.09.

Seven autonomies (Aragon, Basque Country, Catalonia, La Rioja, Madrid, Castilla-La Mancha and Galicia) and the two autonomous cities currently offer their presidents a higher salary than the €85,608.72 paid to the Prime Minister of Spain.

== Regional election timeline ==
Each tenure is set to last for four years. Presidents of Andalusia, the Basque Country, Catalonia and Galicia can trigger snap elections, that would then restart the count until the next one. In the rest of Autonomies, elections are fixed to a certain common date, which is currently "the fourth Sunday of May each four years". If snap elections are triggered in these regions (See 2021 Madrilenian regional elections), the mandate given to the next elected president would last until the calendar date in which elections would have been called again.

== Term limits ==
The Region of Murcia and Extremadura were the only Autonomous Communities that, since 2014, limit the number of terms of their Presidents. The Region of Murcia sets the limit at two, whether consecutive or not, while Extremadura stated that "not being able to be elected president of the Junta de Extremadura those who have already held this position for two successive terms, unless four years have passed since the end of their term and, in no case, whoever has held this position for at least eight years can be elected". However, in 2019, the article that limited the terms of the President of Extremadura was repealed. Two more regions, Catalonia and Castilla-La Mancha, have had their Statutes of Autonomy modified to allow their regional parliaments to establish a term limit, although mandates have not been regulated. In 2021, the Assembly of Murcia eliminated the term limit that would have forbidden president López Miras from seeking a third term.

== Relationship with vice-president ==
The existence of the figure of a vice-president varies by Autonomous community. In all communities it is a power of the elected President to appoint a vice-president to replace them if needed, but not all Presidents choose to have an official one, instead appointing a member of their cabinet as their possible replacement.

- Three Autonomous community have three vice-presidents: Andalusia (Antonio Sanz, PP; Manuel Gavira, Vox and Carolina España, PP), Navarre (Javier Remírez, PSOE; Ana Ollo, GBai and Begoña Alfaro, Contigo) and the Valencian Community (Susana Camarero, PP; José Luís Díez Climent, PP and Vicente Martínez, PP).
- Four Autonomous communities have two vice-presidents: The Basque Country (Ibone Bengoetxea, PNV and Mikel Torres, PSE), Castile and León (Carlos Pollán, Vox and Isabel Blanco, PP), Castilla-La Mancha (José Luis Martínez, PSOE and José Manuel Caballero, PSOE) and Extremadura (Óscar Fernández, Vox and Abel Bautista, PP).
- Four Autonomous communities have one vice-president: Those communities are Aragon (Alejandro Nolasco, Vox), Asturias (Gimena Llamedo, PSOE), Balearic Islands (Antoni Costa, PP) and Canary Islands (Manuel Domínguez, PP).
- Six Autonomous communities do not have a vice-president: Cantabria, Catalonia, La Rioja, the Community of Madrid, Galicia and Murcia.
- The two Autonomous cities do not have a vice-president.

== Constitutional qualifications by region ==
Region	Title	Minimum Age	Spanish Citizenship	Member of Parliament	Sole employment	Sole office	Term limit	Notes
Andalusia	Presidente de la Junta de Andalucía	18	Yes	Yes	Yes	Yes	No	
Aragon	Presidente de la Diputación General de Aragón	18	Yes	Yes	Yes	Yes	No	
Asturias	Presidente del Principado de Asturias	18	Yes	Yes	Yes	Yes	No	
Balearic Islands	Presidente del Gobierno de las Islas Baleares (President del Govern de les Illes Balears)	18	Yes	Yes	Yes	Yes	No	
Basque Country	Presidente del Gobierno Vasco (Lehendakari)	18	Yes	Yes	Yes	Yes	No	
Canary Islands	Presidente del Gobierno de Canarias	18	Yes	Yes	Yes	Yes	No	
Cantabria	Presidente de Cantabria	18	Yes	Yes	Yes	Yes	No	
Castile and León	Presidente de la Junta de Castilla y León	18	Yes	Yes	Yes	Yes	No	
Castilla-La Mancha	Presidente de la Junta de Comunidades de Castilla-La Mancha	18	Yes	Yes	Yes	Yes	Yes (Unregulated, allowed since 2019)	
Catalonia	Presidente de la Generalidad de Cataluña (President de la Generalitat de Catalunya)	18	Yes	Yes	Yes	Yes	Yes (Unregulated, allowed since 2006)	
Extremadura	Presidente de la Junta de Extremadura	18	Yes	Yes	Yes	Yes	No (From 2014 to 2019: two consecutive terms, or having held the position for at least eight years)	
Galicia	Presidente de la Junta de Galicia (Presidente da Xunta de Galicia)	18	Yes	Yes	Yes	No	No	
La Rioja	Presidente de la Comunidad Autónoma de La Rioja	18	Yes	Yes	Yes	No	No	
Madrid	Presidente de la Comunidad de Madrid	18	Yes	Yes	Yes	No	No	
Murcia	Presidente de la Región de Murcia	18	Yes	Yes	Yes	No	No (From 2014 to 2021: Two terms)	
Navarre	Presidente de la Comunidad Foral de Navarra (Nafarroako Gobernuko Lehendakaria)	18	Yes	Yes	Yes	No	No	
Valencian Community	Presidente de la Generalidad Valenciana (President de la Generalitat Valenciana)	18	Yes	Yes	Yes	No	No	

== In national politics ==
Many regional presidents have served, in addition to the regional level, at different levels of the national government, before or after their election as regional presidents.

- Andalusia:
  - Manuel Chaves: Minister of Labour and National Health Service (1986-1990), Minister of Territorial Policy (2009-2010), Minister of Territorial Policy and Public Administration (2010-2011), Third Deputy Prime Minister of Spain (2009-2011), Second Deputy Prime Minister of Spain (2011).
  - José Antonio Griñán: Minister of Health and Consumption (1992-1993), Minister of Labour and Social Policy (1993-1996).
- Aragon:
  - Luisa Fernanda Rudí: President of the Congress of Deputies (2000-2004).
- Asturias:
  - Francisco Álvarez-Cascos: Deputy Prime Minister of Spain (1996-2000).
- Balearic Islands:
  - Jaume Matas: Minister of the Environment (2000-2003).
  - Francina Armengol: President of the Congress of Deputies (2023–present).
- (Basque Country (autonomous community)) Basque Country:
  - Patxi López: President of the Congress of Deputies (2016).
- Canary Islands:
  - Jerónimo Saavedra: Minister of Public Administration (1993-1995), Minister of Education and Science (1995-1996).
  - Ángel Víctor Torres: Minister of Territorial Policy (2023-present)
- Castile and León:
  - José María Aznar: Prime Minister of Spain (1996-2004).
  - Jesús Posada: Minister of Agriculture, Fisheries and Food (1999-2000), Minister of Public Administrations (2000-2002), President of the Congress of Deputies (2011-2016).
  - Juan José Lucas: Minister for the Presidency (2001-2002), President of the Senate (2002-2004).
- (Castilla–La Mancha) Castilla-La Mancha:
  - José Bono: Minister of Defence (2004-2006), President of the Congress of Deputies (2008-2011).
  - María Dolores de Cospedal: Minister of Defence (2016-2018).
- Catalonia:
  - José Montilla: Minister of Industry, Trade and Tourism (2004-2006).
  - Salvador Illa: Minister of Health (2020-2021).
- (Galicia (Spain)) Galicia:
  - Manuel Fraga: Minister of Information and Tourism (1962-1969), Minister of the Interior (1975-1976).
- Community of Madrid:
  - Alberto Ruiz-Gallardón: Minister of Justice (2011-2014).
  - Esperanza Aguirre: Minister of Education, Culture and Sport (1996-1999), President of the Senate (1999-2002).
  - Cristina Cifuentes: Government Delegate in the Community of Madrid (2012-2015).
- Valencian Community:
  - Eduardo Zaplana: Minister of Labour and Social Affairs (2002-2004).

== Historical composition ==
Year	Andalusia	Aragon	Asturias	Balearic Islands	Basque Country	Canary Islands	Cantabria	Castile and León	Castilla-La Mancha	Catalonia	Extremadura	Galicia	La Rioja	Madrid	Murcia	Navarre	Valencia	Ceuta	Melilla
1983	Spanish Socialist Workers' Party	Spanish Socialist Workers' Party	Spanish Socialist Workers' Party	People's Alliance	Basque Nationalist Party	Spanish Socialist Workers' Party	People's Alliance	Spanish Socialist Workers' Party	Spanish Socialist Workers' Party	Democratic Convergence of Catalonia	Spanish Socialist Workers' Party	People's Alliance	Spanish Socialist Workers' Party	Spanish Socialist Workers' Party	Spanish Socialist Workers' Party	Independent	Spanish Socialist Workers' Party	No office	
1984	Spanish Socialist Workers' Party	Spanish Socialist Workers' Party	Spanish Socialist Workers' Party	People's Alliance	Basque Nationalist Party	Spanish Socialist Workers' Party	People's Alliance	Spanish Socialist Workers' Party	Spanish Socialist Workers' Party	Democratic Convergence of Catalonia	Spanish Socialist Workers' Party	People's Alliance	Spanish Socialist Workers' Party	Spanish Socialist Workers' Party	Spanish Socialist Workers' Party	Independent	Spanish Socialist Workers' Party	No office	
1985	Spanish Socialist Workers' Party	Spanish Socialist Workers' Party	Spanish Socialist Workers' Party	People's Alliance	Basque Nationalist Party	Spanish Socialist Workers' Party	People's Alliance	Spanish Socialist Workers' Party	Spanish Socialist Workers' Party	Democratic Convergence of Catalonia	Spanish Socialist Workers' Party	People's Alliance	Spanish Socialist Workers' Party	Spanish Socialist Workers' Party	Spanish Socialist Workers' Party	Spanish Socialist Workers' Party	Spanish Socialist Workers' Party	No office	
1986	Spanish Socialist Workers' Party	Spanish Socialist Workers' Party	Spanish Socialist Workers' Party	People's Alliance	Basque Nationalist Party	Spanish Socialist Workers' Party	People's Alliance	Spanish Socialist Workers' Party	Spanish Socialist Workers' Party	Democratic Convergence of Catalonia	Spanish Socialist Workers' Party	People's Alliance	Spanish Socialist Workers' Party	Spanish Socialist Workers' Party	Spanish Socialist Workers' Party	Spanish Socialist Workers' Party	Spanish Socialist Workers' Party	No office	
1987	Spanish Socialist Workers' Party	Aragonese Party	Spanish Socialist Workers' Party	People's Alliance	Basque Nationalist Party	Spanish Socialist Workers' Party	People's Alliance	Spanish Socialist Workers' Party	Spanish Socialist Workers' Party	Democratic Convergence of Catalonia	Spanish Socialist Workers' Party	People's Alliance	Spanish Socialist Workers' Party	Spanish Socialist Workers' Party	Spanish Socialist Workers' Party	Spanish Socialist Workers' Party	Spanish Socialist Workers' Party	No office	
1988	Spanish Socialist Workers' Party	Aragonese Party	Spanish Socialist Workers' Party	People's Party	Basque Nationalist Party	Democratic and Social Centre	Independent	People's Alliance	Spanish Socialist Workers' Party	Democratic Convergence of Catalonia	Spanish Socialist Workers' Party	Spanish Socialist Workers' Party	People's Alliance	Spanish Socialist Workers' Party	Spanish Socialist Workers' Party	Spanish Socialist Workers' Party	Spanish Socialist Workers' Party	No office	
1989	Spanish Socialist Workers' Party	Aragonese Party	Spanish Socialist Workers' Party	People's Party	Basque Nationalist Party	Democratic and Social Centre	Independent	People's Alliance	Spanish Socialist Workers' Party	Democratic Convergence of Catalonia	Spanish Socialist Workers' Party	Spanish Socialist Workers' Party	People's Party	Spanish Socialist Workers' Party	Spanish Socialist Workers' Party	Spanish Socialist Workers' Party	Spanish Socialist Workers' Party	No office	
1990	Spanish Socialist Workers' Party	Aragonese Party	Spanish Socialist Workers' Party	People's Party	Basque Nationalist Party	Democratic and Social Centre	Independent	People's Party	Spanish Socialist Workers' Party	Democratic Convergence of Catalonia	Spanish Socialist Workers' Party	Spanish Socialist Workers' Party	People's Party	Spanish Socialist Workers' Party	Spanish Socialist Workers' Party	Spanish Socialist Workers' Party	Spanish Socialist Workers' Party	No office	
1991	Spanish Socialist Workers' Party	Aragonese Party	Spanish Socialist Workers' Party	People's Party	Basque Nationalist Party	Democratic and Social Centre	Spanish Socialist Workers' Party	People's Party	Spanish Socialist Workers' Party	Democratic Convergence of Catalonia	Spanish Socialist Workers' Party	People's Party	Spanish Socialist Workers' Party	Spanish Socialist Workers' Party	Spanish Socialist Workers' Party	Spanish Socialist Workers' Party	Spanish Socialist Workers' Party	No office	
1992	Spanish Socialist Workers' Party	Aragonese Party	Spanish Socialist Workers' Party	People's Party	Basque Nationalist Party	Spanish Socialist Workers' Party	Union for the Progress of Cantabria	People's Party	Spanish Socialist Workers' Party	Democratic Convergence of Catalonia	Spanish Socialist Workers' Party	People's Party	Spanish Socialist Workers' Party	Spanish Socialist Workers' Party	Spanish Socialist Workers' Party	Navarrese People's Union	Spanish Socialist Workers' Party	No office	
1993	Spanish Socialist Workers' Party	Aragonese Party	Spanish Socialist Workers' Party	People's Party	Basque Nationalist Party	Spanish Socialist Workers' Party	Union for the Progress of Cantabria	People's Party	Spanish Socialist Workers' Party	Democratic Convergence of Catalonia	Spanish Socialist Workers' Party	People's Party	Spanish Socialist Workers' Party	Spanish Socialist Workers' Party	Spanish Socialist Workers' Party	Navarrese People's Union	Spanish Socialist Workers' Party	No office	
1994	Spanish Socialist Workers' Party	Spanish Socialist Workers' Party	Spanish Socialist Workers' Party	People's Party	Basque Nationalist Party	Canarian Coalition	Union for the Progress of Cantabria	People's Party	Spanish Socialist Workers' Party	Democratic Convergence of Catalonia	Spanish Socialist Workers' Party	People's Party	Spanish Socialist Workers' Party	Spanish Socialist Workers' Party	Spanish Socialist Workers' Party	Navarrese People's Union	Spanish Socialist Workers' Party	No office	
1995	Spanish Socialist Workers' Party	Spanish Socialist Workers' Party	Spanish Socialist Workers' Party	People's Party	Basque Nationalist Party	Canarian Coalition	Union for the Progress of Cantabria	People's Party	Spanish Socialist Workers' Party	Democratic Convergence of Catalonia	Spanish Socialist Workers' Party	People's Party	Spanish Socialist Workers' Party	Spanish Socialist Workers' Party	Spanish Socialist Workers' Party	Navarrese People's Union	Spanish Socialist Workers' Party	Progress and Future of Ceuta	People's Party
1996	Spanish Socialist Workers' Party	People's Party	People's Party	People's Party	Basque Nationalist Party	Canarian Coalition	People's Party	People's Party	Spanish Socialist Workers' Party	Democratic Convergence of Catalonia	Spanish Socialist Workers' Party	People's Party	People's Party	People's Party	People's Party	Spanish Socialist Workers' Party	People's Party	People's Party	People's Party
1997	Spanish Socialist Workers' Party	People's Party	People's Party	People's Party	Basque Nationalist Party	Canarian Coalition	People's Party	People's Party	Spanish Socialist Workers' Party	Democratic Convergence of Catalonia	Spanish Socialist Workers' Party	People's Party	People's Party	People's Party	People's Party	Navarrese People's Union	People's Party	People's Party	People's Party
1998	Spanish Socialist Workers' Party	People's Party	People's Party	People's Party	Basque Nationalist Party	Canarian Coalition	People's Party	People's Party	Spanish Socialist Workers' Party	Democratic Convergence of Catalonia	Spanish Socialist Workers' Party	People's Party	People's Party	People's Party	People's Party	Navarrese People's Union	People's Party	People's Party	People's Party
1999	Spanish Socialist Workers' Party	People's Party	Asturian Renewal Union	People's Party	Basque Nationalist Party	Canarian Coalition	People's Party	People's Party	Spanish Socialist Workers' Party	Democratic Convergence of Catalonia	Spanish Socialist Workers' Party	People's Party	People's Party	People's Party	People's Party	Navarrese People's Union	People's Party	People's Party	Independent
2000	Spanish Socialist Workers' Party	Spanish Socialist Workers' Party	Spanish Socialist Workers' Party	Spanish Socialist Workers' Party	Basque Nationalist Party	Canarian Coalition	People's Party	People's Party	Spanish Socialist Workers' Party	Democratic Convergence of Catalonia	Spanish Socialist Workers' Party	People's Party	People's Party	People's Party	People's Party	Navarrese People's Union	People's Party	Liberal Independent Group	Coalition for Melilla
2001	Spanish Socialist Workers' Party	Spanish Socialist Workers' Party	Spanish Socialist Workers' Party	Spanish Socialist Workers' Party	Basque Nationalist Party	Canarian Coalition	People's Party	People's Party	Spanish Socialist Workers' Party	Democratic Convergence of Catalonia	Spanish Socialist Workers' Party	People's Party	People's Party	People's Party	People's Party	Navarrese People's Union	People's Party	Liberal Independent Group	People's Party
2002	Spanish Socialist Workers' Party	Spanish Socialist Workers' Party	Spanish Socialist Workers' Party	Spanish Socialist Workers' Party	Basque Nationalist Party	Canarian Coalition	People's Party	People's Party	Spanish Socialist Workers' Party	Democratic Convergence of Catalonia	Spanish Socialist Workers' Party	People's Party	People's Party	People's Party	People's Party	Navarrese People's Union	People's Party	People's Party	People's Party
2003	Spanish Socialist Workers' Party	Spanish Socialist Workers' Party	Spanish Socialist Workers' Party	Spanish Socialist Workers' Party	Basque Nationalist Party	Canarian Coalition	People's Party	People's Party	Spanish Socialist Workers' Party	Democratic Convergence of Catalonia	Spanish Socialist Workers' Party	People's Party	People's Party	People's Party	People's Party	Navarrese People's Union	People's Party	People's Party	People's Party
2004	Spanish Socialist Workers' Party	Spanish Socialist Workers' Party	Spanish Socialist Workers' Party	People's Party	Basque Nationalist Party	Canarian Coalition	Regionalist Party of Cantabria	People's Party	Spanish Socialist Workers' Party	Socialists' Party of Catalonia	Spanish Socialist Workers' Party	People's Party	People's Party	People's Party	People's Party	Navarrese People's Union	People's Party	People's Party	People's Party
2005	Spanish Socialist Workers' Party	Spanish Socialist Workers' Party	Spanish Socialist Workers' Party	People's Party	Basque Nationalist Party	Canarian Coalition	Regionalist Party of Cantabria	People's Party	Spanish Socialist Workers' Party	Socialists' Party of Catalonia	Spanish Socialist Workers' Party	People's Party	People's Party	People's Party	People's Party	Navarrese People's Union	People's Party	People's Party	People's Party
2006	Spanish Socialist Workers' Party	Spanish Socialist Workers' Party	Spanish Socialist Workers' Party	People's Party	Basque Nationalist Party	Canarian Coalition	Regionalist Party of Cantabria	People's Party	Spanish Socialist Workers' Party	Socialists' Party of Catalonia	Spanish Socialist Workers' Party	Spanish Socialist Workers' Party	People's Party	People's Party	People's Party	Navarrese People's Union	People's Party	People's Party	People's Party
2007	Spanish Socialist Workers' Party	Spanish Socialist Workers' Party	Spanish Socialist Workers' Party	People's Party	Basque Nationalist Party	Canarian Coalition	Regionalist Party of Cantabria	People's Party	Spanish Socialist Workers' Party	Socialists' Party of Catalonia	Spanish Socialist Workers' Party	Spanish Socialist Workers' Party	People's Party	People's Party	People's Party	Navarrese People's Union	People's Party	People's Party	People's Party
2008	Spanish Socialist Workers' Party	Spanish Socialist Workers' Party	Spanish Socialist Workers' Party	Spanish Socialist Workers' Party	Basque Nationalist Party	Canarian Coalition	Regionalist Party of Cantabria	People's Party	Spanish Socialist Workers' Party	Socialists' Party of Catalonia	Spanish Socialist Workers' Party	Spanish Socialist Workers' Party	People's Party	People's Party	People's Party	Navarrese People's Union	People's Party	People's Party	People's Party
2009	Spanish Socialist Workers' Party	Spanish Socialist Workers' Party	Spanish Socialist Workers' Party	Spanish Socialist Workers' Party	Basque Nationalist Party	Canarian Coalition	Regionalist Party of Cantabria	People's Party	Spanish Socialist Workers' Party	Socialists' Party of Catalonia	Spanish Socialist Workers' Party	Spanish Socialist Workers' Party	People's Party	People's Party	People's Party	Navarrese People's Union	People's Party	People's Party	People's Party
2010	Spanish Socialist Workers' Party	Spanish Socialist Workers' Party	Spanish Socialist Workers' Party	Spanish Socialist Workers' Party	Spanish Socialist Workers' Party	Canarian Coalition	Regionalist Party of Cantabria	People's Party	Spanish Socialist Workers' Party	Socialists' Party of Catalonia	Spanish Socialist Workers' Party	People's Party	People's Party	People's Party	People's Party	Navarrese People's Union	People's Party	People's Party	People's Party
2011	Spanish Socialist Workers' Party	Spanish Socialist Workers' Party	Spanish Socialist Workers' Party	Spanish Socialist Workers' Party	Spanish Socialist Workers' Party	Canarian Coalition	Regionalist Party of Cantabria	People's Party	Spanish Socialist Workers' Party	Democratic Convergence of Catalonia	Spanish Socialist Workers' Party	People's Party	People's Party	People's Party	People's Party	Navarrese People's Union	People's Party	People's Party	People's Party
2012	Spanish Socialist Workers' Party	People's Party	Asturias Forum	People's Party	Spanish Socialist Workers' Party	Canarian Coalition	People's Party	People's Party	People's Party	Democratic Convergence of Catalonia	People's Party	People's Party	People's Party	People's Party	People's Party	Navarrese People's Union	People's Party	People's Party	People's Party
2013	Spanish Socialist Workers' Party	People's Party	Spanish Socialist Workers' Party	People's Party	Basque Nationalist Party	Canarian Coalition	People's Party	People's Party	People's Party	Democratic Convergence of Catalonia	People's Party	People's Party	People's Party	People's Party	People's Party	Navarrese People's Union	People's Party	People's Party	People's Party
2014	Spanish Socialist Workers' Party	People's Party	Spanish Socialist Workers' Party	People's Party	Basque Nationalist Party	Canarian Coalition	People's Party	People's Party	People's Party	Democratic Convergence of Catalonia	People's Party	People's Party	People's Party	People's Party	People's Party	Navarrese People's Union	People's Party	People's Party	People's Party
2015	Spanish Socialist Workers' Party	People's Party	Spanish Socialist Workers' Party	People's Party	Basque Nationalist Party	Canarian Coalition	People's Party	People's Party	People's Party	Democratic Convergence of Catalonia	People's Party	People's Party	People's Party	People's Party	People's Party	Navarrese People's Union	People's Party	People's Party	People's Party
2016	Spanish Socialist Workers' Party	Spanish Socialist Workers' Party	Spanish Socialist Workers' Party	Spanish Socialist Workers' Party	Basque Nationalist Party	Canarian Coalition	Regionalist Party of Cantabria	People's Party	Spanish Socialist Workers' Party	Democratic Convergence of Catalonia	Spanish Socialist Workers' Party	People's Party	People's Party	People's Party	People's Party	Geroa Bai	Spanish Socialist Workers' Party	People's Party	People's Party
2017	Spanish Socialist Workers' Party	Spanish Socialist Workers' Party	Spanish Socialist Workers' Party	Spanish Socialist Workers' Party	Basque Nationalist Party	Canarian Coalition	Regionalist Party of Cantabria	People's Party	Spanish Socialist Workers' Party	Democratic Convergence of Catalonia	Spanish Socialist Workers' Party	People's Party	People's Party	People's Party	People's Party	Geroa Bai	Spanish Socialist Workers' Party	People's Party	People's Party
2018	People's Party	Spanish Socialist Workers' Party	Spanish Socialist Workers' Party	Spanish Socialist Workers' Party	Basque Nationalist Party	Canarian Coalition	Regionalist Party of Cantabria	People's Party	Spanish Socialist Workers' Party	Suspended	Spanish Socialist Workers' Party	People's Party	People's Party	People's Party	People's Party	Geroa Bai	Spanish Socialist Workers' Party	People's Party	People's Party
2019	People's Party	Spanish Socialist Workers' Party	Spanish Socialist Workers' Party	Spanish Socialist Workers' Party	Basque Nationalist Party	Canarian Coalition	Regionalist Party of Cantabria	People's Party	Spanish Socialist Workers' Party	Independent	Spanish Socialist Workers' Party	People's Party	People's Party	People's Party	People's Party	Geroa Bai	Spanish Socialist Workers' Party	People's Party	People's Party
2020	People's Party	Spanish Socialist Workers' Party	Spanish Socialist Workers' Party	Spanish Socialist Workers' Party	Basque Nationalist Party	Spanish Socialist Workers' Party	Regionalist Party of Cantabria	People's Party	Spanish Socialist Workers' Party	Independent	Spanish Socialist Workers' Party	People's Party	Spanish Socialist Workers' Party	People's Party	People's Party	Spanish Socialist Workers' Party	Spanish Socialist Workers' Party	People's Party	Citizens
2021	People's Party	Spanish Socialist Workers' Party	Spanish Socialist Workers' Party	Spanish Socialist Workers' Party	Basque Nationalist Party	Spanish Socialist Workers' Party	Regionalist Party of Cantabria	People's Party	Spanish Socialist Workers' Party	Republican Left of Catalonia	Spanish Socialist Workers' Party	People's Party	Spanish Socialist Workers' Party	People's Party	People's Party	Spanish Socialist Workers' Party	Spanish Socialist Workers' Party	People's Party	Citizens
2022	People's Party	Spanish Socialist Workers' Party	Spanish Socialist Workers' Party	Spanish Socialist Workers' Party	Basque Nationalist Party	Spanish Socialist Workers' Party	Regionalist Party of Cantabria	People's Party	Spanish Socialist Workers' Party	Republican Left of Catalonia	Spanish Socialist Workers' Party	People's Party	Spanish Socialist Workers' Party	People's Party	People's Party	Spanish Socialist Workers' Party	Spanish Socialist Workers' Party	People's Party	Independent
2023	People's Party	Spanish Socialist Workers' Party	Spanish Socialist Workers' Party	Spanish Socialist Workers' Party	Basque Nationalist Party	Spanish Socialist Workers' Party	Regionalist Party of Cantabria	People's Party	Spanish Socialist Workers' Party	Republican Left of Catalonia	Spanish Socialist Workers' Party	People's Party	Spanish Socialist Workers' Party	People's Party	People's Party	Spanish Socialist Workers' Party	Spanish Socialist Workers' Party	People's Party	Independent
2024	People's Party	People's Party	Spanish Socialist Workers' Party	People's Party	Basque Nationalist Party	Canarian Coalition	People's Party	People's Party	Spanish Socialist Workers' Party	Republican Left of Catalonia	People's Party	People's Party	People's Party	People's Party	People's Party	Spanish Socialist Workers' Party	People's Party	People's Party	People's Party
2025	People's Party	People's Party	Spanish Socialist Workers' Party	People's Party	Basque Nationalist Party	Canarian Coalition	People's Party	People's Party	Spanish Socialist Workers' Party	Socialists' Party of Catalonia	People's Party	People's Party	People's Party	People's Party	People's Party	Spanish Socialist Workers' Party	People's Party	People's Party	People's Party
2026	People's Party	People's Party	Spanish Socialist Workers' Party	People's Party	Basque Nationalist Party	Canarian Coalition	People's Party	People's Party	Spanish Socialist Workers' Party	Socialists' Party of Catalonia	People's Party	People's Party	People's Party	People's Party	People's Party	Spanish Socialist Workers' Party	People's Party	People's Party	People's Party

== See also ==
- List of current presidents of the autonomous communities of Spain
- Government of Spain
- Autonomous communities of Spain
- List of female presidents of the autonomous communities of Spain
- List of Spanish regional legislatures

== Notes ==
Translation of terms
