= First government of Emiliano García-Page =

García-Page Cabinet
- Cabinet of Castilla–La Mancha

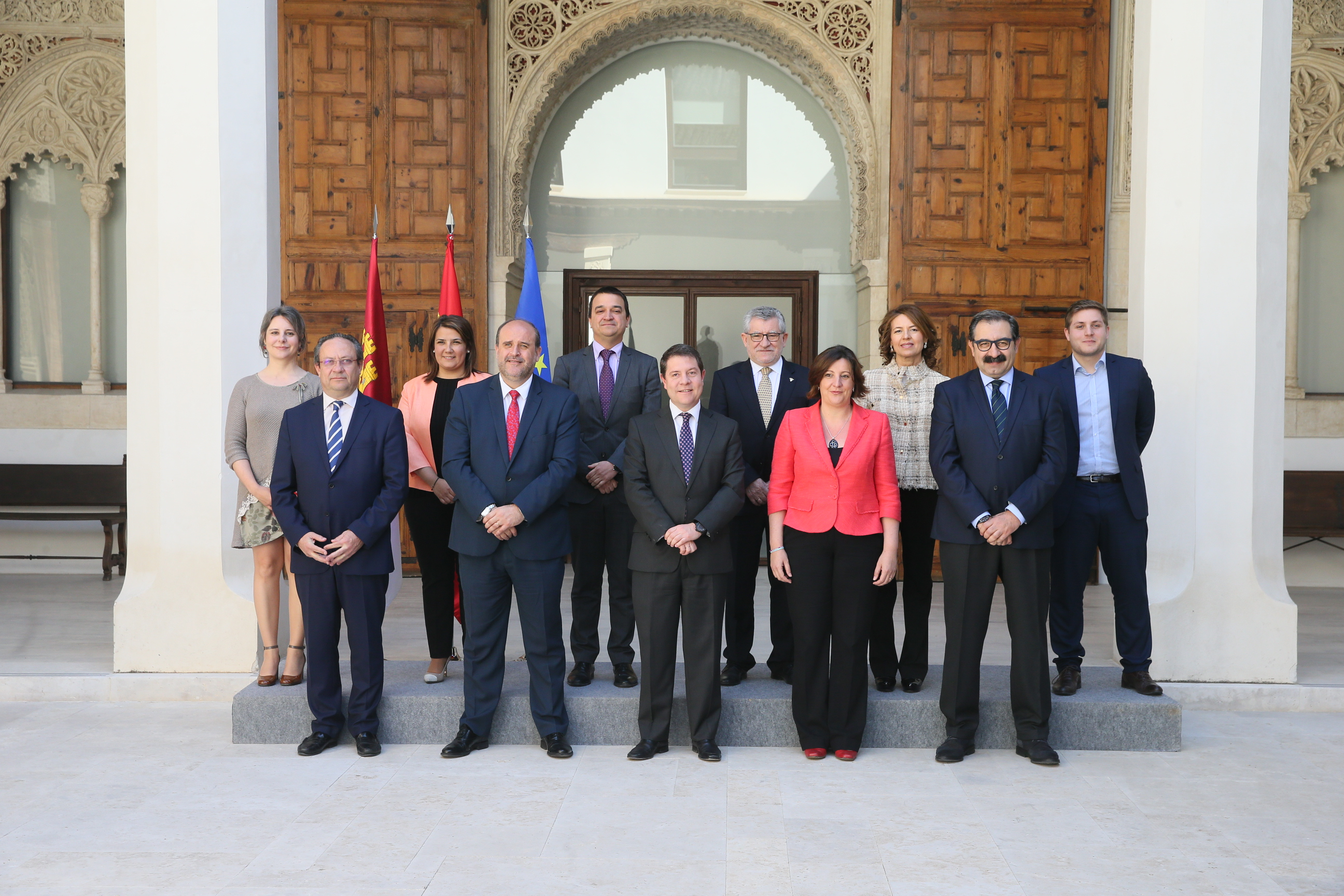
- Date formed: 9 July 2015
- Date dissolved: Incumbent

People and organisations
- Head of government: Emiliano García-Page
- No. of ministers: 8-10 (including vice-presidents)
- Member party: PSOE; Podemos (since 2017)

History
- Election: 2015 regional election
- Predecessor: Cospedal
- Successor: García-Page II

The First García-Page Government was the regional government of Castilla–La Mancha, formed in July 2015 and led by Emiliano García-Page (PSOE), who took possession as President of the Junta of Communities of Castilla–La Mancha on 4 July. The ministers ("consejeros") assumed office on 9 July. Two Podemos ministers entered the council of government in August 2017.

Aside from the president and his ministers, the director of the Woman Institute Araceli Martínez and the spokesperson Nacho Hernando (without rank of regional minister) also meet at the council of government. The members of the cabinet served in acting capacity since the May 2019 regional election until the formation a new government presided again by García-Page in July 2019.

== Council of Government ==
Name	Portrait	Office	Took office	Left office	Party	Refs
Emiliano García-Page Sánchez		President of Castile-La Mancha	4 July 2015	Incumbent	PSOE	
José Luis Martínez Guijarro		Vice-President	9 July 2015		PSOE	
José Luis Martínez Guijarro		Acting Minister of Public Works	2016	2016	PSOE	
José Luis Martínez Guijarro		First Vice-President	10 August 2017	Incumbent	PSOE	
José García Molina		Second Vice-President	10 August 2017	Incumbent	Podemos	
Patricia Franco Jiménez		Minister of Economy, Businesses and Employment	9 July 2015	Incumbent		
Juan Alfonso Ruiz Molina		Minister of Finance and Public Administrations	9 July 2015	Incumbent	PSOE	
Jesús Fernández Sanz		Minister of Health	9 July 2015	Incumbent		
Francisco Martínez Arroyo		Minister of Agriculture, Environment and Rural Development	9 July 2015	Incumbent		
Reyes Estévez Forneiro		Minister of Education, Culture and Sports	9 July 2015	6 May 2015		
Ángel Felpeto Enríquez		Minister of Education, Culture and Sports	6 May 2016	Incumbent	PSOE	
Elena de la Cruz		Minister of Public Works	9 July 2015	4 April 2015	PSOE	(Note: Died in office)
María Agustina García Elez		Minister of Public Works	10 April 2017	Incumbent	PSOE	
Aurelia Sánchez Navarro		Minister of Social Welfare	9 July 2015	Incumbent		
Inmaculada Herranz		Minister for the Coordination of the Plan of Citizen Guarantees	10 August 2017	Incumbent	Podemos	
