= Mercedes Gómez =

Spanish politician

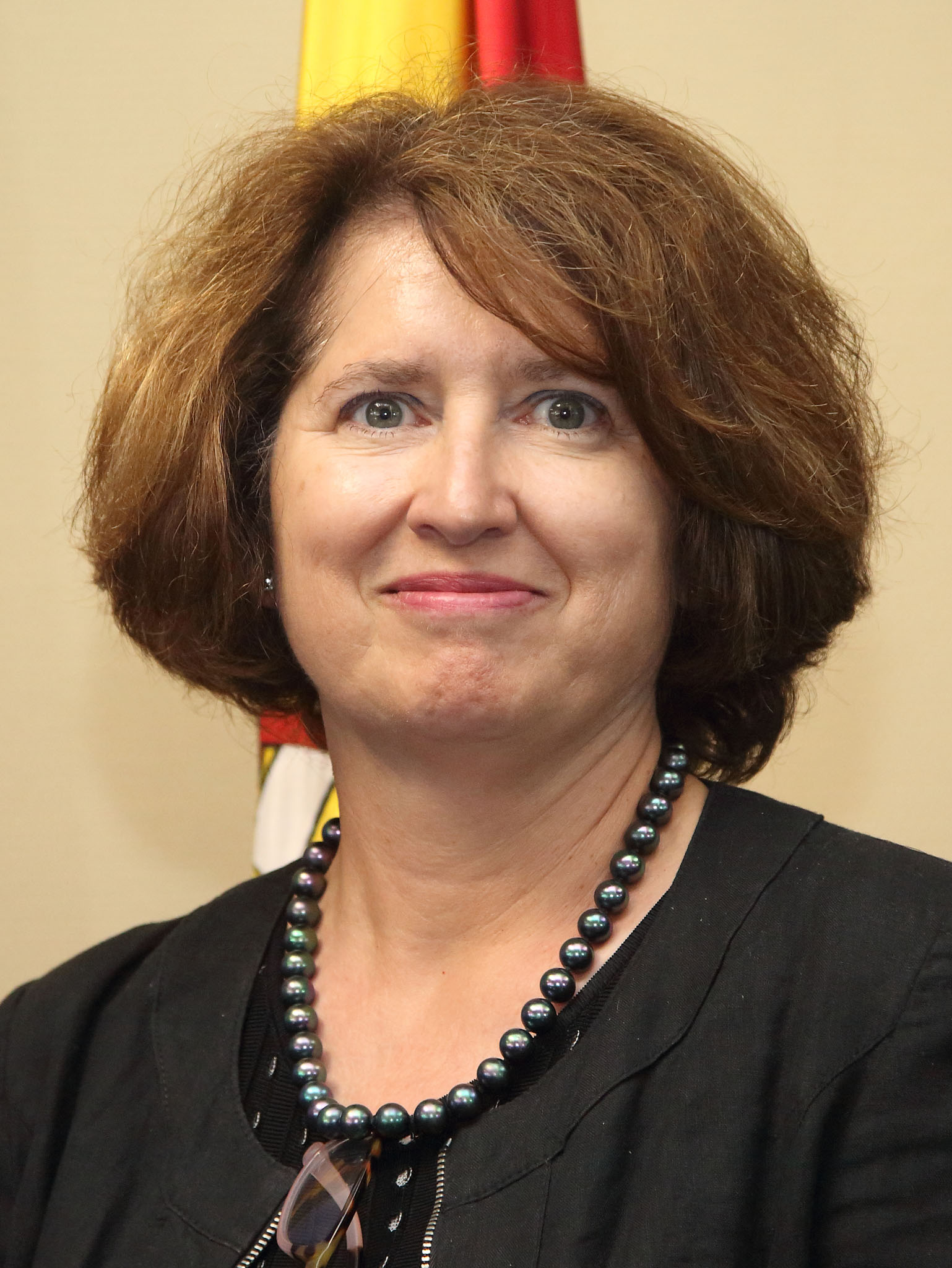
In 2019

María Mercedes Gómez Rodríguez (born 1966) is a Spanish politician and civil servant. She served as Minister of Agriculture in the Regional Government of Castilla–La Mancha from 2003 to 2008.

== Biography ==
Born on 1 April 1966 in Madrid, she obtained a licentiate degree in Veterinary at the Complutense University of Madrid and worked as vet assistant in Coslada and Prádena. She later became as civil servant in the regional administration of Castilla–La Mancha in 1990, where she served in a number of posts related to Agriculture and Environment, She became the Minister of Agriculture in the Government of Castilla–La Mancha in 2003, as part of the regional cabinet of José Bono, continuing in the post after the latter's resignation and ensuing installment of José María Barreda as premier. She remained in office until August 2008, when Barreda reshuffled the regional government. She was appointed President of the Tagus Hydrographic Confederation (CHT) by the Council of Ministers in July 2010. She left office in 2012 following the accession to power of the new government of the People's Party presided by Mariano Rajoy and was replaced by Miguel Antolín Martínez.

Political offices
Preceded by	Minister of Agriculture of Castilla–La Mancha; 2003–2008	Succeeded by José Luis Martínez Guijarro
Preceded by José María Macías Márquez	President of the Tagus Hydrographic Confederation; 2010–2012	Succeeded by Miguel Antolín Martínez
