= List of current presidents of the autonomous communities of Spain =

This is a list of incumbent presidents of the autonomous communities of Spain. The presidents head the regional government of the autonomous communities and are elected by the regional legislatures.

== Presidents ==
Currently, the longest serving incumbent Spanish regional president is Juan Jesús Vivas of Ceuta, having served since February 2001, and the most recently inaugurated is Juanfran Pérez Llorca of Valencian Community, having served since December 2025. In terms of age, Melilla president Juan José Imbroda (born 1944) is the oldest president, and Murcia president Fernando López Miras (born 1983) is the youngest.

PP (13): Andalusia, Aragon, Balearic Islands, Cantabria, Castile and León, Ceuta, Extremadura, Galicia, Community of Madrid, La Rioja, Melilla, Murcia, Valencian Community

PSOE (4): Asturias, Castilla-La Mancha, Catalonia, Navarre

PNV (1): Basque Country

CCa (1): Canary Islands

Share of seats
PP	68.42%	(13 presidencies)
PSOE	21.05%	(4 presidencies)
PNV	5.26%	(1 presidency)
CCa	5.26%	(1 presidency)

Share of population
PP	66.15%
PSOE	24.48%
PNV	4.64%
CCa	4.57%

Autonomous community	President	Portrait	Party/Alliance	Born	Prior public experience	Took office	End of term	Tenure	Cabinets	Government	Past Presidents	^{Refs.}
Andalusia	Juan Manuel Moreno		People's Party of Andalusia	May 1, 1970 (age 56)	Regional deputy, Deputy, Senator	18 January 2019	2030	7 years and 291 days	Moreno I (2019-2022); Moreno II (2022-2026); Moreno III (2026-current)	Coalition government: PP, Vox	List	
Aragon	Jorge Azcón		People's Party of Aragon	November 21, 1973 (age 52)	Mayor	11 August 2023	2030	3 years and 86 days	Azcón I (2023-2026); Azcón II (2026-current)	Coalition government: PP, Vox	List	
Asturias	Adrián Barbón		Asturian Socialist Federation	January 4, 1979 (age 47)	Regional deputy, Deputy, Mayor	20 July 2019	2027	7 years and 108 days	Barbón I (2019-2023); Barbón II (2023-current)	Minority government: PSOE, CxAst	List	
Balearic Islands	Marga Prohens		People's Party of the Balearic Islands	May 24, 1982 (age 44)	Regional deputy, Deputy	6 July 2023	2027	3 years and 122 days	Prohens I (2023-current)	Minority government: PP	List	
Basque Country	Imanol Pradales		Basque Nationalist Party	April 21, 1975 (age 51)	Regional deputy	22 June 2024	2028	2 years and 136 days	Pradales I (2024-current)	Coalition government: PNV, PSOE	List	
Canary Islands	Fernando Clavijo		Canarian Coalition	August 10, 1971 (age 55)	Regional deputy, Senator, Mayor, Regional president	12 July 2023	2027	3 years and 116 days	Clavijo II (2023-current)	Coalition government: CCa, PP, ASG, AHI	List	
Cantabria	María José Sáenz de Buruaga		People's Party of Cantabria	June 4, 1968 (age 58)	Regional deputy, Regional Vice-President, Regional Minister	4 July 2023	2027	3 years and 124 days	Buruaga I (2023-current)	Minority government: PP	List	
Castile and León	Alfonso Fernández Mañueco		People's Party of Castile and León	April 29, 1965 (age 61)	Regional deputy, Provincial President, Mayor, Regional Minister	12 July 2019	2030	7 years and 116 days	Mañueco I (2019-2022); Mañueco II (2022-2026); Mañueco III (2026-current)	Coalition government: PP, Vox	List	
Castilla–La Mancha	Emiliano García-Page		Socialist Party of Castilla–La Mancha	June 11, 1968 (age 58)	Regional deputy, Senator, Regional President, Mayor	4 July 2015	2027	11 years and 124 days	García-Page I (2015-2019); García-Page II (2019-2023); García-Page III (2023-present)	Majority government: PSOE	List	
Catalonia	Salvador Illa		Socialists' Party of Catalonia	May 5, 1966 (age 60)	Mayor, Minister	10 August 2024	2028	2 years and 87 days	Illa I (2024-current)	Minority government: PSOE	List	
Ceuta	Juan Jesús Vivas		People's Party of Ceuta	February 27, 1953 (age 73)	Regional deputy	6 February 2001	2027	25 years and 272 days	Vivas I (2001-2003); Vivas II (2003-2007); Vivas III (2007–2011); Vivas IV (2011-2015); Vivas V (2015-2019); Vivas VI (2019-2023); Vivas VII (2023-current)	Minority government: PP	List	
Extremadura	María Guardiola		People's Party of Extremadura	December 5, 1978 (age 47)	Regional deputy, Regional Minister	14 July 2023	2030	3 years and 114 days	Guardiola I (2023-2026); Guardiola II (2026-current)	Coalition government: PP, Vox	List	
Galicia	Alfonso Rueda		People's Party of Galicia	July 8, 1968 (age 58)	Regional deputy, Regional Vice-President, Regional Minister	13 May 2022	2028	4 years and 176 days	Rueda I (2022-2024) Rueda II (2024-current)	Majority government: PP	List	
La Rioja	Gonzalo Capellán		People's Party of La Rioja	January 23, 1972 (age 54)	Regional deputy, Regional Minister	28 June 2023	2027	3 years and 130 days	Capellán I (2023-current)	Majority government: PP	List	
Madrid	Isabel Díaz Ayuso		People's Party of the Community of Madrid	October 17, 1978 (age 48)	Regional deputy	17 August 2019	2027	7 years and 111 days	Ayuso I (2019-2021); Ayuso II (2021-2023); Ayuso III (2023-present)	Majority government: PP	List	
Melilla	Juan José Imbroda		People's Party of Melilla	June 24, 1944 (age 82)	Regional president	7 July 2023	2027	3 years and 121 days	Imbroda I (2000-2003); Imbroda II (2003-2007); Imbroda III (2007-2011); Imbroda IV (2011-2015); Imbroda V (2015-2019); Imbroda VI (2023-current)	Majority government: PP	List	
Murcia	Fernando López Miras		People's Party of the Region of Murcia	October 4, 1983 (age 43)	Regional deputy	2 May 2017	2027	9 years and 187 days	López Miras I (2017-2019); López Miras II (2019-2023); López Miras III (2023-current)	Minority government: PP (Since July 2024)	List	
Navarre	María Chivite		Socialist Party of Navarre	June 5, 1978 (age 48)	Regional deputy, Senator	6 August 2019	2027	7 years and 91 days	Chivite I (2019-2023); Chivite II (2023-current)	Minority coalition government: PSOE, GBai, Contigo Navarra	List	
Valencian Community	Juanfran Pérez Llorca		People's Party of the Valencian Community	1976 (age 49–50)	Regional deputy, Provincial president	2 December 2025	2027	338 days	Pérez Llorca I (2025-current)	Minority government: PP	List	

== See also ==
- List of female regional presidents in Spain
- Presidents of the autonomous communities
