= List of female regional presidents in Spain =

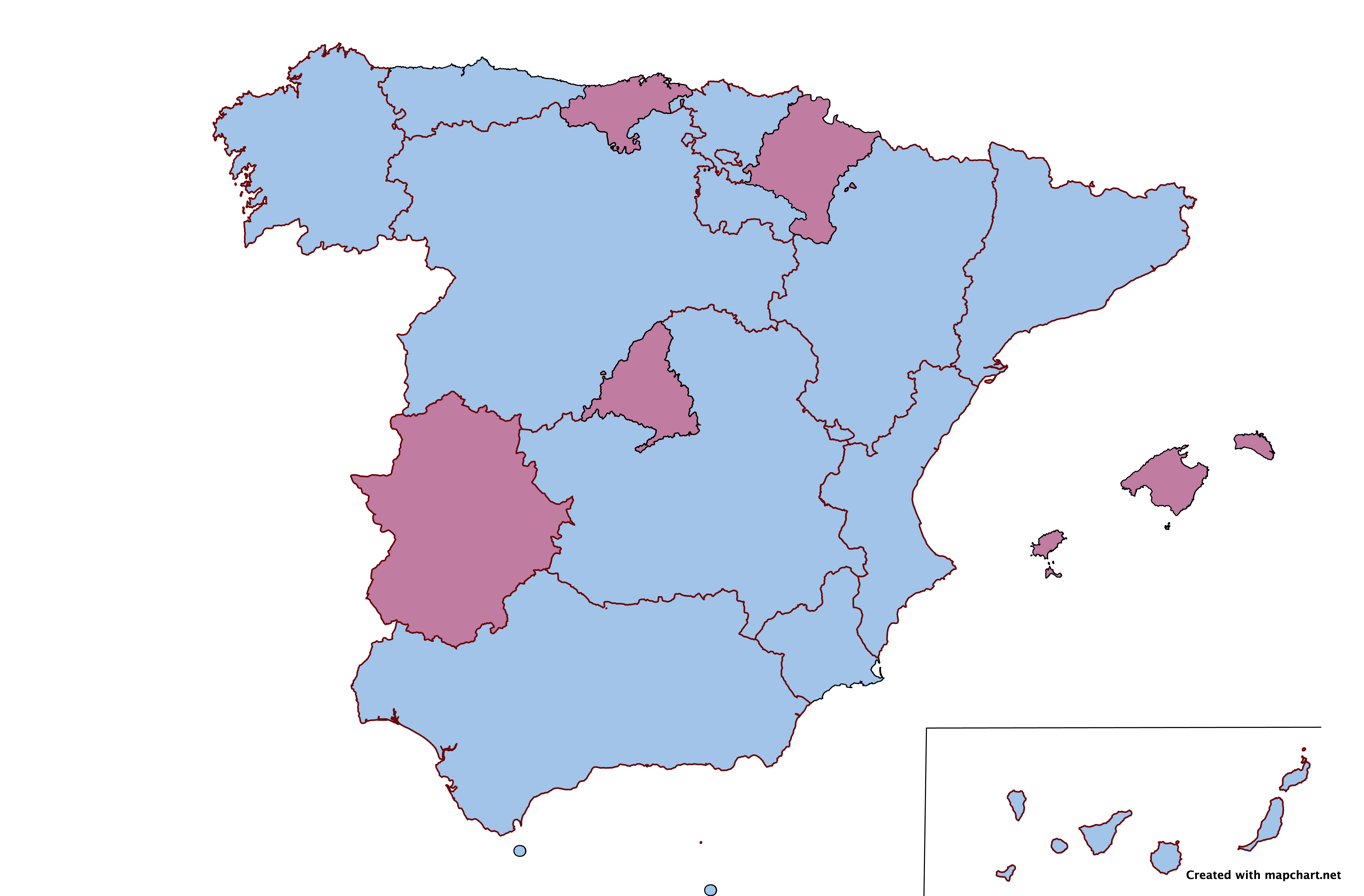
Incumbent Spanish regional presidents by gender: Male Female

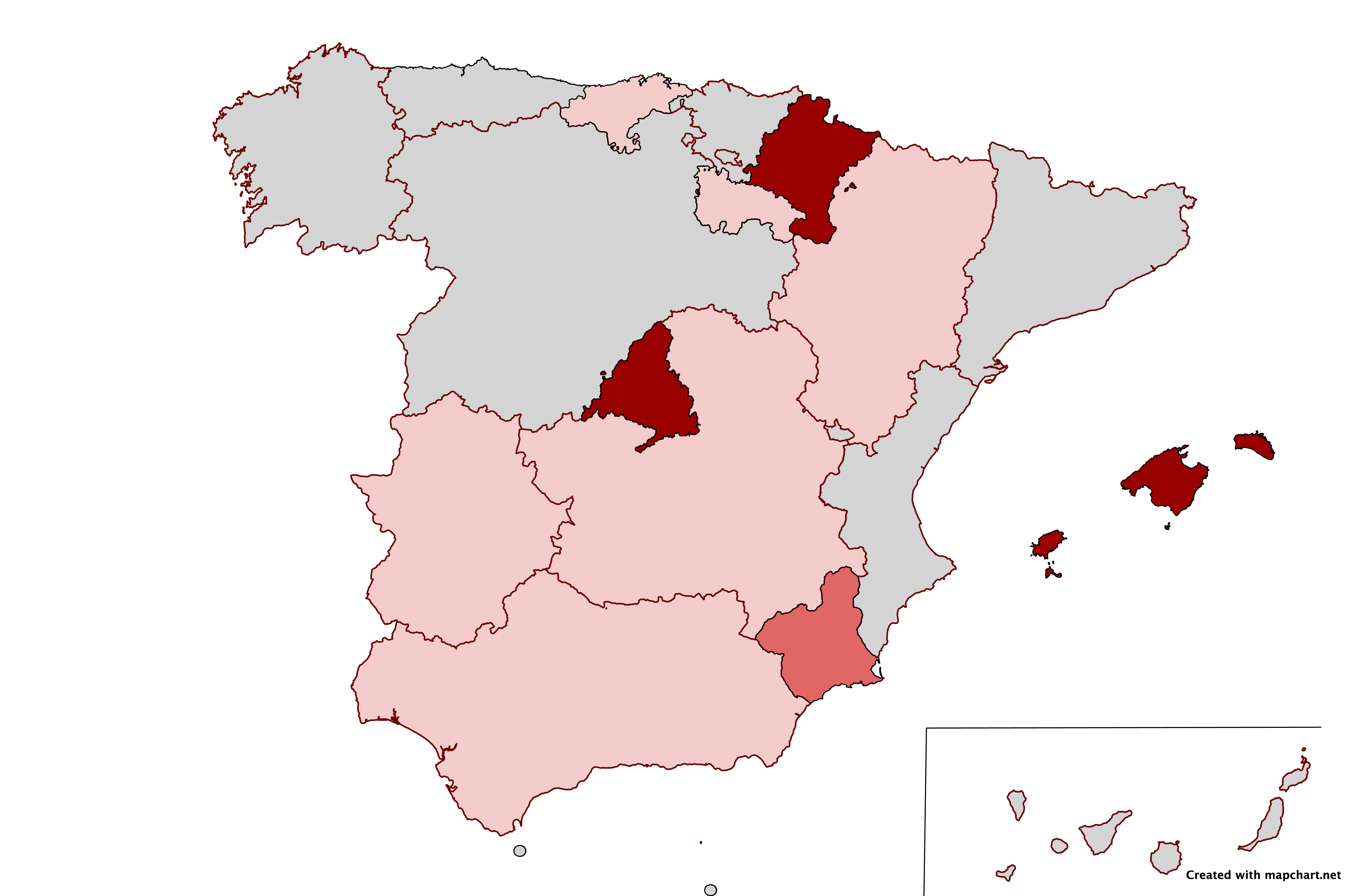
Number of female regional presidents by Autonomous Community (past and present): 0 1 2 3

As of July 2023, 17 women have served or are serving as the president of a Spanish Autonomous Community (including three acting presidents) and none have served or are serving as presidents of the autonomous cities. Currently, five women are serving as regional presidents.

== History ==
The first woman to act as regional president was María Antonia Martínez, who served as Acting president of Murcia for almost a month after former president Andrés Hernández Ros was forced to resign. She would be later, in 1993, elected as President of the region after once again another former president, Carlos Collado, was also forced to resign.

The first woman to assume office as regional president following a regional election was Esperanza Aguirre, who was elected on November 21, 2003, by the Assembly of Madrid, also becoming the first woman to held the position since María Antonia Martínez, and she also became the first woman to resign from her position following a corruption scandal. Since then, apart from the Region of Murcia and the Community of Madrid, eight other Autonomous Communities have elected female regional Presidents after their respective regional elections.

On 20 June 2023, Mae de la Concha became the first woman not to belong to one of the two main nationwide Spanish political parties to be appointed as regional president, although serving only in acting capacity.

To date, no woman has ever changed parties during her presidential term.

== Demographics ==
To date, ten Autonomous Communities have elected women as regional presidents, and only Navarre and the Balearic Islands have elected women from different political parties to hold the position. Navarre was also the first community where a woman followed another woman as president, and is the first and to date only community to have three women in a row being elected as president - although the Balearic Islands also have three women in a row as president. The Community of Madrid and Navarre are the communities that have elected the most women to the position, with three each.

As of 2021, a total of 7 autonomous communities have never had a woman as president. Those regions are: Asturias, the Basque Country, the Canary Islands, Castile and León, Catalonia, Galicia and the Valencian Community and the two autonomous cities of Ceuta and Melilla. Only one autonomous community (Castile and León) has never seen a major party nominate a woman in a regional election.

No women of color have been elected as regional president.

Esperanza Aguirre from the Community of Madrid has been the longest-serving female regional president, with a mandate of 8 years and 301 days while María Antonia Martínez from the Region of Murcia has been the shortest-serving female president.

From June 25 to July 1, 2015, from April 4 to May 3, 2017, and since July 14, 2023 there was a total of five women serving as regional presidents, making these the periods with the greatest number of women serving at the same time.

=== Histograph ===
Starting	Total	Graph
March 9, 1984	1 (5.3%)	❚
April 1, 1984	0 (0%)	
May 3, 1993	1 (5.3%)	❚
July 5, 1995	0 (0%)	
November 21, 2003	1 (5.3%)	❚
June 22, 2011	2 (10.5%)	❚❚
June 28, 2011	3 (15.8%)	❚❚❚
July 14, 2011	4 (21.1%)	❚❚❚❚
September 18, 2012	3 (15.8%)	❚❚❚
September 6, 2013	4 (21.1%)	❚❚❚❚
June 25, 2015	5 (26.3%)	❚❚❚❚❚
July 5, 2015	4 (21.1%)	❚❚❚❚
April 4, 2017	5 (26.3%)	❚❚❚❚❚
May 4, 2017	4 (21.1%)	❚❚❚❚
April 26, 2018	3 (15.8%)	❚❚❚
January 19, 2019	2 (10.5%)	❚❚
August 17, 2019	3 (15.8%)	❚❚❚
August 29, 2019	4 (21.1%)	❚❚❚❚
June 30, 2023	3 (15.8%)	❚❚❚
July 4, 2023	4 (21.1%)	❚❚❚❚
July 14, 2023	5 (26.3%)	❚❚❚❚❚

== Autonomous Communities ==
Portrait	Name (lifespan)	State	Term start	Term end	Tenure	Party	Notes	Departure	Ref
	María Antonia Martínez García (born 1953)	Region of Murcia	March 9, 1984	March 31, 1984	22 days	Spanish Socialist Workers' Party	First woman serving as President of the Region of Murcia (in acting capacity).	Not reelected	
	María Antonia Martínez García (born 1953)	Region of Murcia	May 3, 1993	July 4, 1995	2 years and 62 days	Spanish Socialist Workers' Party	First woman serving as President of the Region of Murcia. Shortest-serving woman in the post.	Not reelected	
	Esperanza Aguirre y Gil de Biedma (born 1952)	Community of Madrid	November 21, 2003	September 17, 2012	8 years and 301 days	People's Party	First woman elected President of the Community of Madrid. First woman elected president in a regional election. First woman to resign from her post. Longest-serving woman in the post. First woman to be reelected. First woman to be reelected twice. First woman to win by absolute majority.	Resigned	
	María Dolores de Cospedal García (born 1965)	(Castilla–La Mancha) Castilla-La Mancha	June 22, 2011	July 1, 2015	4 years and 9 days	People's Party	First and only woman elected as President of Castilla-La Mancha. First woman to defeat an incumbent president.	Not reelected	
	Yolanda Barcina Angulo (born 1960)	Navarre	June 28, 2011	July 22, 2015	4 years and 24 days	Navarrese People's Union	First woman elected as President of Navarre.	Not up for reelection	
	Luisa Fernanda Rudi Úbeda (born 1950)	Aragon	July 14, 2011	July 4, 2015	3 years and 355 days	People's Party	First and only woman elected as President of Aragon. Oldest woman to be elected as president (60).	Not reelected	
	Susana Díaz Pacheco (born 1974)	Andalusia	September 6, 2013	January 18, 2019	5 years and 134 days	Spanish Socialist Workers' Party	First and only woman elected President of Andalusia. Youngest woman to be elected as President (39).	Not reelected	
	Cristina Cifuentes Cuencas (born 1964)	Community of Madrid	June 25, 2015	April 25, 2018	2 years and 304 days	People's Party		Resigned	
	Uxue Barkos Berruezo (born 1964)	Navarre	July 22, 2015	August 6, 2019	4 years and 15 days	Geroa Bai	First woman to succeed another woman in office.	Not reelected	
	Francina Armengol Socias (born 1971)	Balearic Islands	July 2, 2015	June 20, 2023	7 years and 353 days	Spanish Socialist Workers' Party	First woman elected President of the Balearic Islands. Defeated an incumbent president.	Resigned following electoral defeat	
	María Dolores Pagán Arce (born 1967)	Region of Murcia	April 4, 2017	May 3, 2017	29 days	People's Party		Only serving in acting capacity	
	María Chivite Navascués (born 1978)	Navarre	August 6, 2019	Incumbent	7 years and 76 days	Spanish Socialist Workers' Party	Defeated an incumbent president. Third woman in a row to be elected President of Navarre.	Serving	
	Isabel Díaz Ayuso (born 1978)	Community of Madrid	August 17, 2019	Incumbent	7 years and 65 days	People's Party		Serving	
	Concha Andreu Rodríguez (born 1967)	La Rioja	August 29, 2019	June 29, 2023	3 years and 304 days	Spanish Socialist Workers' Party	First and only woman elected President of La Rioja. Defeated an incumbent president.	Not reelected	
	Mae de la Concha (born 1954)	Balearic Islands	June 20, 2023	July 6, 2023	16 days	Unidas Podemos	Oldest woman to serve as President (68). Succeeded another woman in office.	Only serving in acting capacity	
	María José Sáenz de Buruaga (born 1968)	Cantabria	July 4, 2023	Incumbent	3 years and 109 days	People's Party	First and only woman elected President of Cantabria. Defeated an incumbent president.	Serving	
	Marga Prohens (born 1982)	Balearic Islands	July 6, 2023	Incumbent	3 years and 107 days	People's Party	Third woman in a row to serve as president of the Balearic Islands. Defeated an incumbent President	Serving	
	María Guardiola (born 1978)	Extremadura	July 14, 2023	Incumbent	3 years and 99 days	People's Party	First and only woman elected President of Extremadura.	Serving	

== Autonomous cities ==
As of January 2023, since the approval of the Statues of Autonomy for Ceuta and Melilla, no woman has held the role of president.

== See also ==
- List of current presidents of the autonomous communities of Spain
- President (Autonomous communities of Spain)
