= Eloísa D'Herbil =

- Born: Eloísa María Dolores Juana de la Santísima Trinidad d'Herbil; 27 December 1847; Cádiz, Spain
- Died: 22 June 1943 (aged 95); Buenos Aires, Argentina
- Other names: Eloísa D'Herbil de Silva, Eloísa D. de Silva, Héloïse d’Herbil
- Occupations: pianist, composer
- Years active: 1853–1934
- Known for: One of the first women to compose tangos

Eloisa D'Herbil (also Eloisa D'Herbil de Silva, 27 December 1847 – 22 June 1943) was a Spanish pianist and composer. A child prodigy on the piano, by age seven, she had played before the heads of state in England and Spain. As a child, the press dubbed her "Chopin in skirts" and from a young age, she began composing musical pieces. She immigrated to Argentina in 1868 and continued to write music, becoming one of the first women to write tangos.

== Early life ==
Eloísa María Dolores Juana de la Santísima Trinidad D'Herbil was born on 27 December 1847 in Cádiz, Spain (Note: D'Herbil's date of birth varies widely in 20th-century records being shown as 22 January 1842, 22 January 1846, 1852 (in Cuba), 19th-century dictionaries give the date as 27 December 1847. and newspaper articles from the 1850s reporting her birth confirm the 1847–1848 period.) to the Raquel Angel de Cadia and Joseph D'Herbil. (Note: Some sources state that her father was a French Baron and her mother was either a Portuguese Countess or her grandfather was an Italian Duke. Father's name in various sources is José, Josef, Joseph, and Giuseppe. Claims that her introduction to Argentina resulted because her father had estates in Cuba, managing a beef exporting business to Brazil and Argentina frequently appear in South American sources, but with no citations to source material. Gesualdo makes a Cuban connection with her studying and giving concerts with Gottschalk in 1861 in Cuba and in 1868 in Buenos Aires. However, according to The Grove Dictionary of American Music Gottschalk's biography for these engagements makes no mention of D'Herbil. His tour of Buenos Aires premiered in November 1867 and ended by February 1868. Ricardo Ostuni notes that D'Herbil appeared at a charity recital at Teatro Colón in February 1868, but makes no mention of Gottschalk. If the Glorious Revolution was the reason for D'Herbil's leaving Cádiz, as postulated by Consuelo Pérez Colodrero of the University of Granada, war did not begin until September 1868. Pérez Colodrero states that D'Herbil's father was the Baron of St. Thomas, but shows no sojourn in Cuba.) She began her training before her fifth birthday (Note: Pérez Colodrero gives the date of her training as beginning in 1849. Gottschalk's biography shows in that year he was in France and did not arrive in Spain until 1851.) with the American pianist Louis Moreau Gottschalk and auditioned with the Hungarian composer and pianist Franz Liszt. She would remain a devotée of both and often played their music in concert. Liszt praised her ability to play Chopin, causing Viennese critics to dub the child prodigy as "Chopin in skirts". By the age of six, she had played for Isabella II of Spain. The following year, she played for Queen Victoria and Prince Albert at Windsor Castle and in June of the same year, gave another concert in England in the Queen's Concert Rooms. Her performance was highly praised by the royals. It was noted that her portrait could be widely seen and that Luigi Fontana was sculpting a bust of the young virtuoso.

In 1855, the Spanish poet Manuel José Quintana wrote a poem praising her talent, which was his last lyric before his death. Between 1855 and 1858, D'Herbil played an annual circuit in London, sponsored by patrons such as the Duchess of Sutherland, performing at various town halls and Buckingham Palace. She would play again for Queen Isabella in 1857, 1860 and 1862 and received a set of jeweled earrings, as well as a magnificent medallion for various performances. At times, she also performed with her brother Antonio or Arturo giving concerts with piano, harmonium, and violin. By 1865, D’Herbil was publishing her own compositions, which showed exceptional talent. In 1867, she was hired to play during the Carnival celebrations in Toledo at the Taller del Moro, which had been reopened a few months before as the "Elíseo Garden".

== Argentine career ==
Within a year, possibly due to the violence preceding the Glorious Revolution of 1868, D'Herbil moved to Argentina and continued her career. She organized a charity concert for February 1868 at the Teatro Colón to benefit cholera victims. By 1872, she styled her performances and published music such as La caridad es dios as Eloísa d 'Herbil de Romany, though her husband's name was Guillermo Román. D'Herbil de Romany performed in Teatro Victoria in Buenos Aires in July of that year playing a concerto by Gottschalk. By October, she was performing at the Teatro Solis in Montevideo with the Italian Lyrical Company. Two months later, on 4 December 1872 in Montevideo, she had her first child, Federico Román. By 1 May 1873, the family were back in Buenos Aires. In succession, D'Herbil de Romany had two more children Maria Raquel born on the 31 October 1874 and José Camilo, born on 16 February 1876. (Note: José was re-baptized with the name Mario José Camilo Silva in 1882. The 1895 census confirms this is the same child as four children are named on the record and D'Herbil's answer to how many children she had given birth to is "four"; though she also stated she has been married to Federico Silva since 1873.) Federico Silva served as godfather for all of her children. D'Herbil began using the name Eloisa D. de Silva, sometime after the birth of her third child. Her last child, Maria Eloisa Silva was born on 6 April 1881 to her and Federico Silva.

De Silva's first compositions were written for song or piano with verses written by other artists. These include such works as Rayo de luna (Moonbeam) with lyrics by Carlos Guido Spano and Los barqueros (The boatmen) with began composing pieces for singing, reciting and piano, such as "Moonbeam", with verses by Carlos Guido Spano, "Los barqueros", with words by Becker. Between 1872 and 1885 she composed El Maco (The Prison), Y a mí qué (What do I care), Che no calotiés! (Hey, no stealing), and Por la calle Arenales (For Arenales Street), some of the first tangos to be written by a woman. Like other women tango writers, she sometimes wrote under a pseudonym to protect her reputation. El Maco was published in 1904 under the name of Miguel J. Tornquist. She wrote approximately 100 tangos, many after 1900, including Calote (Robbery), El mozo rubio (The Blond Boy), Evangélica (Evangelical), La multa (The Fine), Que sí que no (That's Yes That's No), Yo soy la rubia (I Am the Blond), among others.

Between 1913 and 1914, the Boletín Oficial de la República Argentina listed numerous composition titles including, A mi bandera (To my flag), Becquerianas (Bécquer devotees), Brumas (Mists), Crisantema (chrysanthemum), En el baile (In the dance), Ilusorias (Deceptions), La Canción del ombú (The Song of the ombu tree), La Caridad es Dios (Charity is God), Las Palomas (The Doves), Rosas de otoño (Roses of Autumn), and ¡Ultimo Adiós! (Final Goodbye). In 1934, she composed the Himno del Congreso Eucarístico (Hymn of the Eucharistic Congress) and dedicated to Cardinal Pacelli, who would later be Pope Pius XII.

== Death and legacy ==
De Silva died on 22 June 1943 at her home in Buenos Aires. (Note: On his blog entry, written in 2009, Ostuni notes that her obituary appeared in La Prensa on Thursday, 24 June 1943 at page 12.) In 2006, Silvia Miguens published a novel, La baronesa del tango (The Baroness of the Tango) based on the life of the composer.
