= Assassination of Eduardo Puelles =

- Part of Basque conflict
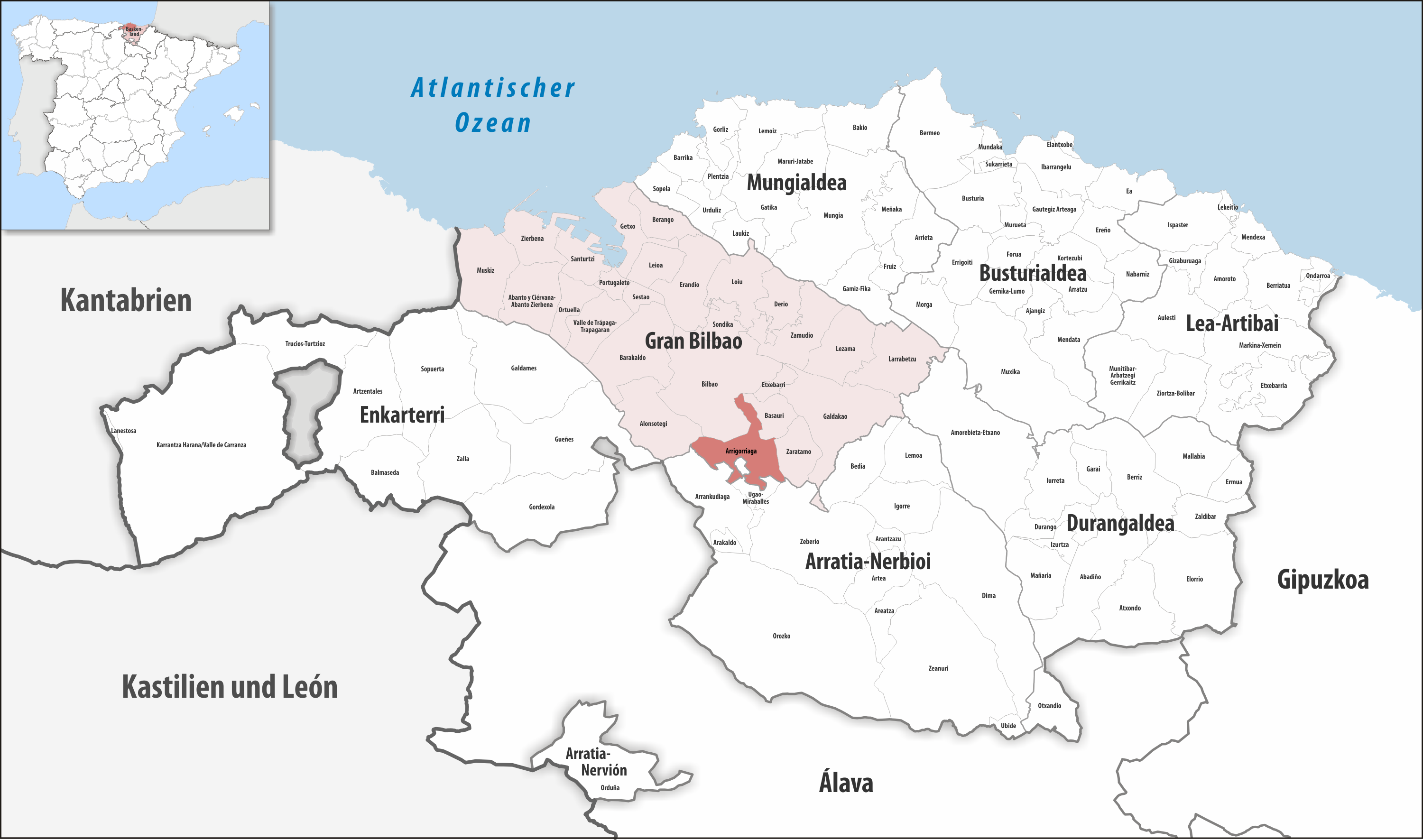
- Map of Arrigorriaga in Spain
- Location: Arrigorriaga, Spain
- Date: 19 June 2009; 9:05 a.m
- Target: Eduardo Puelles
- Weapon: Bomb attached to his car
- Deaths: 1
- Perpetrator: ETA
- Assailants: Iñigo Zapirain (bomb maker); Daniel Pastor Alonso (Assisted in placing the bomb)
- Charges: 4 people arrested
- Convictions: 45 years in prison and financial compensation to the victims family

The assassination of Eduardo Puelles was carried out by the separatist organization ETA in Arrigorriaga, Spain, on 19 June 2009, by placing a limpet mine on his car. Puelles was an inspector in the Spanish National Police Corps, dedicated to counterterrorism, and its significance stemmed from it being the first attack carried out by the group since the change of government in the Basque Government after the 2009 elections and the last fatal attack carried out by ETA in the Basque Country. The event also occurred on the 22nd anniversary of the Hipercor bombing, ETA's deadliest attack, which claimed 21 lives.

== Incident ==
On 19 June 2009, at approximately 9:00 a.m, as he started his Renault Mégane, which he was using to travel to his job, and while parked in an outdoor parking lot in the municipality of Arrigorriaga, where he lived, a powerful explosion occurred, engulfing the car in flames. Puelles was burned beyond recognition inside, having no time to react. The explosion was caused by a device (containing 2 kg of explosives) that had been hidden by ETA members next to the car's fuel tank. Despite the immediate arrival of an ambulance and several fire crews, by the time the fire (which also affected five other vehicles) was extinguished, the inspector was already deceased. Due to the proximity of his home, the victim's wife arrived at the scene a few minutes after the explosion and had to be treated for an anxiety attack.

== Aftermath ==
The assassination of Puelles was the first perpetrated by the organization after Patxi López took office as Lehendakari (President of the Basque Government), having replaced Juan José Ibarretxe on 7 May. The attack was initially attributed to legal members (not on the police's radar) of the terrorist group. Members of the Basque Parliament, as well as all democratic political forces in the state, unanimously condemned the assassination. Euzko Gaztedi also condemned the attack. Furthermore, Prime Minister José Luis Rodríguez Zapatero awarded Eduardo Puelles the Gold Medal of the Order of Police Merit. His funeral was a state affair, attended by the Prince and Princess of Asturias and the highest-ranking representatives of the national and regional governments, as well as the leading figures of the main political parties. It was held the following day in the city of Bilbao, where a demonstration of condemnation for the assassination, organized by the Basque Government, also took place that afternoon. The march was attended by more than 25,000 people, culminated at Bilbao City Hall, where the Lehendakari (President of the Basque Government) delivered a speech in tribute and condemning the attack. Following this, the inspector's widow, accompanied by her two children, addressed the attendees, in a speech directed specifically at her husband's killers.

In September 2009, Puelles' family urged the Arrigorriaga City Council to hold acts of recognition and tribute in the town, specifically the naming of a public space after him, as well as the removal of street names dedicated to ETA members, a request that was ratified by the Basque High Court. Puelles' family placed a plaque at the site of the attack in 2015; the site where they hold an annual commemorative gathering.

== Arrests ==
In the early morning of 1 March 2011, four members of the Otazua commando unit linked to the attack were arrested: Lorena López Díez (31 years old), Iñigo Zapirain Romano (34), Beatriz Etxeberría Caballero (33), and Daniel Pastor Alonso (37). Pastor, the commando leader, Zapirain, and Etxeberría were sentenced in 2013 by the National Court to 45 years in prison each and ordered to pay financial compensation to Puelles' widow and children. The bomb was manufactured by Zapirain, he also initially placed the bomb. But was assisted by Alonso as he had trouble finding the right spot to attach it.
