= Second government of Emiliano García-Page =

2nd government of Emiliano García-Page
- Government of Castilla–La Mancha
- 2019–present
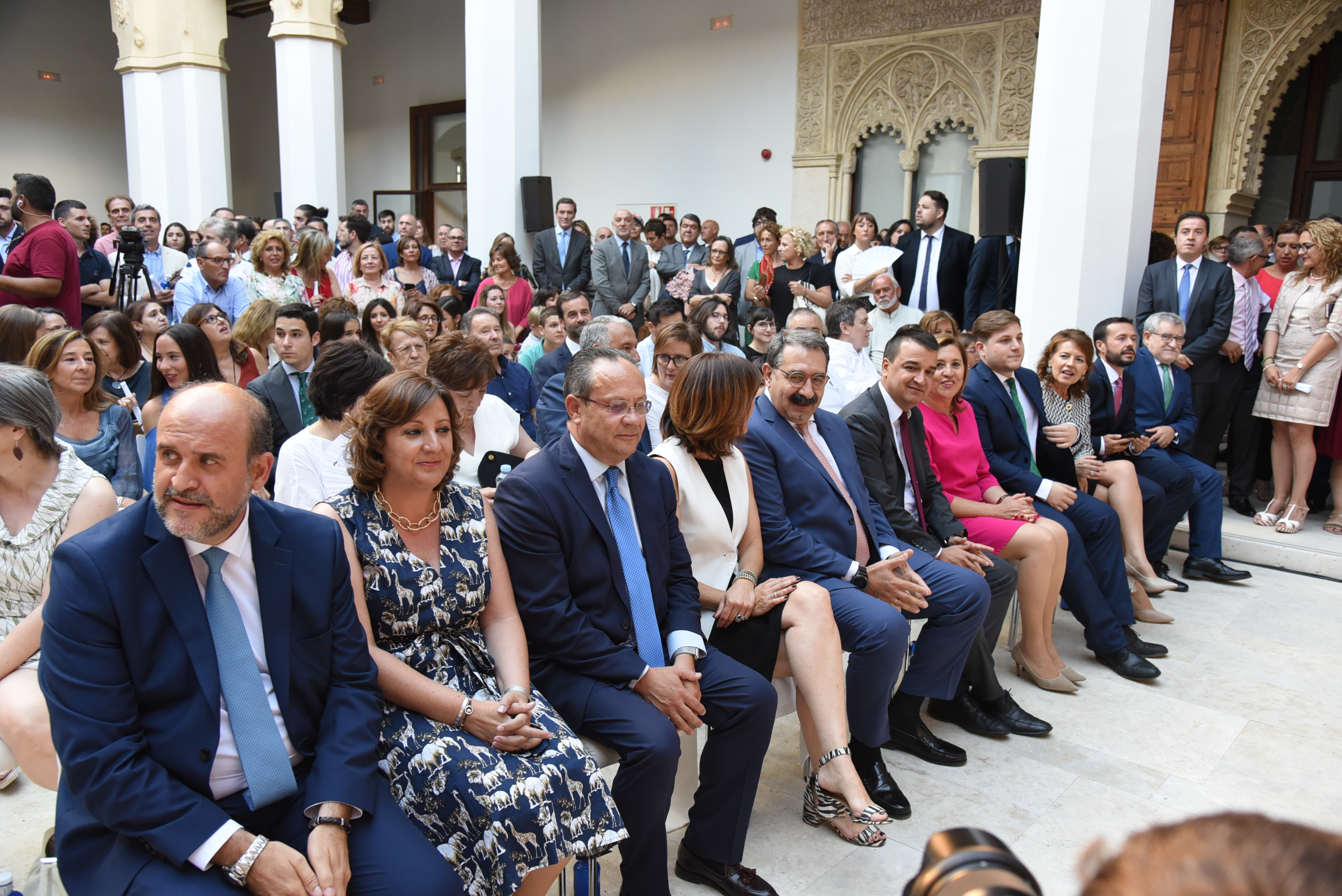
- The government in July 2019
- Date formed: 8 July 2019
- Date dissolved: 8 July 2023

People and organisations
- Monarch: Felipe VI
- President: Emiliano García-Page
- Vice President: José Luis Martínez Guijarro
- No. of ministers: 10 (Note: Does not include the President.)
- Total no. of members: 11
- Member party: PSOE
- Status in legislature: Majority government
- Opposition party: PP
- Opposition leader: Francisco Núñez

History
- Election: 2019 regional election
- Legislature term: 10th Cortes
- Budget: 2020, 2021, 2022
- Predecessor: García-Page I
- Successor: García-Page III

The second government of Emiliano García-Page was formed on 8 July 2019, following the latter's election as President of the Junta of Communities of Castilla–La Mancha by the Cortes of Castilla–La Mancha on 3 July and his swearing-in on 5 July, as a result of the Spanish Socialist Workers' Party (PSOE) emerging as the largest parliamentary force at the 2019 regional election with an absolute majority of seats. It succeeded the first García-Page government and was Junta of Communities of Castilla–La Mancha from 6 July 2019 to 8 July 2023.

The cabinet comprises members of the PSOE and a number of independents.

== Investiture ==
Investiture; Emiliano García-Page (PSOE)
Ballot →	3 July 2019
Required majority →	17 out of 33
Yes: • PSOE (19)	19 / 33
No: • PP (10); • Cs (4)	14 / 33
Abstentions	0 / 33
Absentees	0 / 33

== Cabinet changes ==
García-Page's second government saw a number of cabinet changes during its tenure:

- On 6 April 2021, the Social Welfare minister, Aurelia Sánchez Navarro, vacated the office following her election as regional senator to the Cortes Generales. She was replaced in her cabinet post by Bárbara García Torijano.

== Council of Government ==
The Junta of Communities of Castilla–La Mancha is structured into the offices for the president, the vice president and nine ministries.

← García-Page II Government → (8 July 2019 – present)
Portfolio	Name	Party	Took office	Left office	Ref.
President	Emiliano García-Page	PSOE	5 July 2019	Incumbent	
Vice President	José Luis Martínez Guijarro	PSOE	8 July 2019	Incumbent	
Minister of Economy, Business and Employment	Patricia Franco	PSOE (Ind.)	8 July 2019	Incumbent	
Minister of Finance and Public Administrations	Juan Alfonso Ruiz	PSOE	8 July 2019	Incumbent	
Minister of Equality and Spokesperson	Blanca Fernández Morena	PSOE	8 July 2019	Incumbent	
Minister of Health	Jesús Fernández Sanz	PSOE (Ind.)	8 July 2019	Incumbent	
Minister of Agriculture, Water and Rural Development	Francisco Martínez Arroyo	PSOE (Ind.)	8 July 2019	Incumbent	
Minister of Education, Culture and Sports	Rosana Rodríguez	PSOE	8 July 2019	Incumbent	
Minister of Development	Nacho Hernando	PSOE	8 July 2019	Incumbent	
Minister of Social Welfare	Aurelia Sánchez Navarro	PSOE (Ind.)	8 July 2019	6 April 2021	
Minister of Sustainable Development	José Luis Escudero Palomo	PSOE	8 July 2019	Incumbent	
=== Changes April 2021 ===
Portfolio	Name	Party	Took office	Left office	Ref.
Minister of Social Welfare	Bárbara García Torijano	PSOE	6 April 2021	Incumbent	

== Notes ==
Preceded by García-Page I	Junta of Communities of Castilla–La Mancha; 2019–present	Incumbent
