= Palacio de Fuensalida =

Coordinates: 39.8564°N 4.0281°W

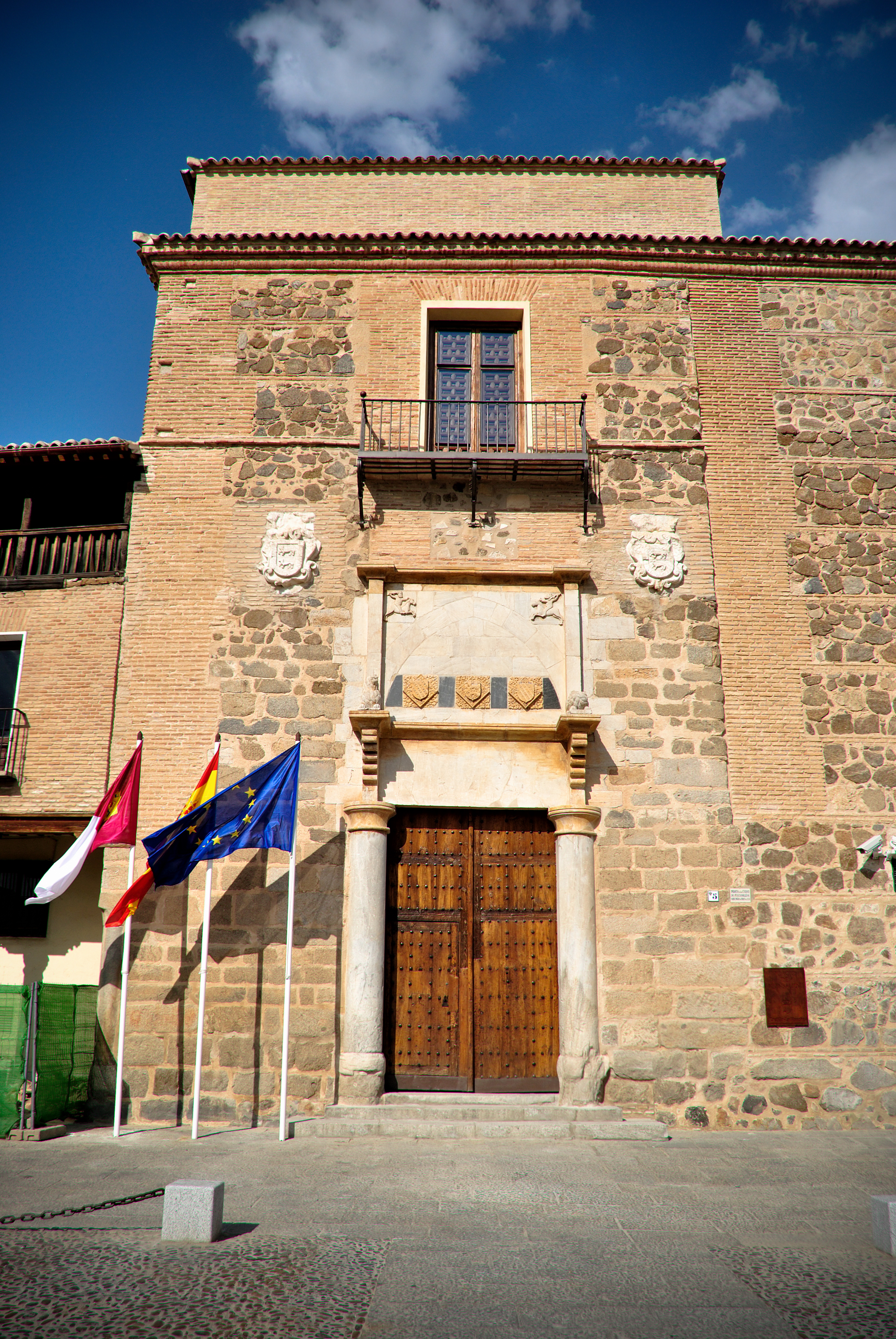
Portal

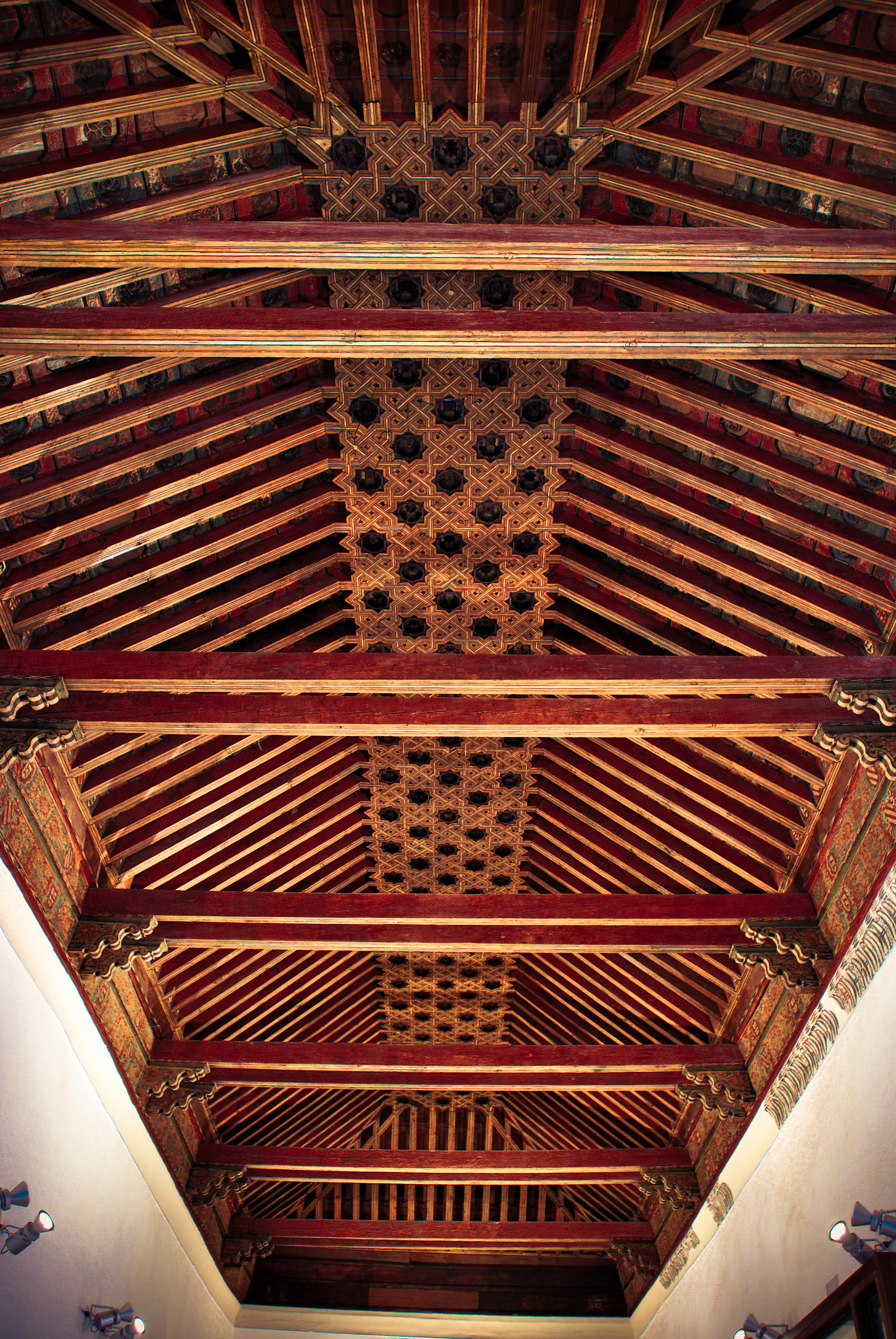
Coffered ceiling

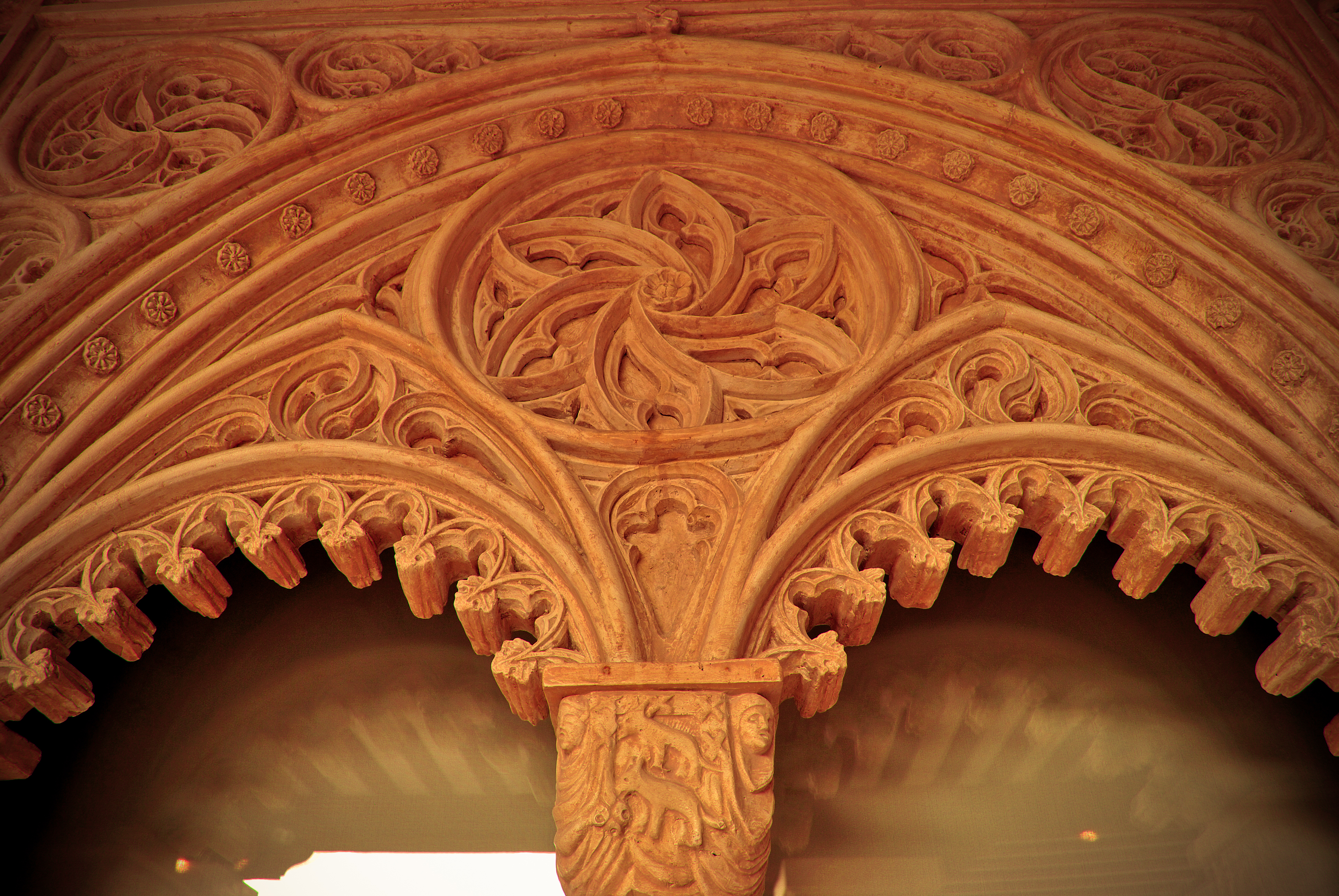
Detail

The Palace of Fuensalida, is a palace located in city of Toledo, Castile-La Mancha, Spain that was built in the mid-15th century by Pedro López de Ayala, the first lord of Fuensalida, is an example of the Toledan Mudéjar, a historical typology that is scarce in Toledo built heritage, where there exist a merging of three styles: Gothic, Plateresque and Mudéjar.

It is integrated in a big block, which also includes the Taller del Moro and the Iglesia de Santo Tomé, which forms the north façade of the Plaza del Conde.

The first Count of Fuensalida, Pedro López de Ayala, commissioned this house in 1440 for the mayorazgos of this title, of which was founder. This first Count of Fuensalida, son of the famous Chancellor López de Ayala, mayor of Toledo and of the fortresses of the city.

Charles V, Holy Roman Emperor lived in this Palace while the construction of the Alcázar was completed. In his letters and in its courtyard, his son and future king, Philip II, experienced some of his childhood experiences, along with his mother, the Empress, here. Today, a sculpture by Pompeo Leoni representing Isabel of Portugal presides over the courtyard of Fuensalida.

== Legend ==
During an absence of the Emperor in the palace, there occurred the illness and subsequent death of his wife, Isabel of Portugal. The funeral procession departed from this Palace with the corpse journeying towards Granada. A legend arose that Francisco de Borja, Duke of Gandía, anonymously in love with the Empress, led the funeral procession, and he had to recognize Isabel's corpse upon his arrival in the Alhambra. There he opened the coffin and, after verifying the deterioration of the beauty of which it was his mistress, and pronounced those proverbial words: I will not serve again to any lord that can die.

That event made him change his life. He was ordained a priest and professed in the Society of Jesus, of which he was third General Superior. Then the Church made him Saint.
