= Elena de la Cruz =

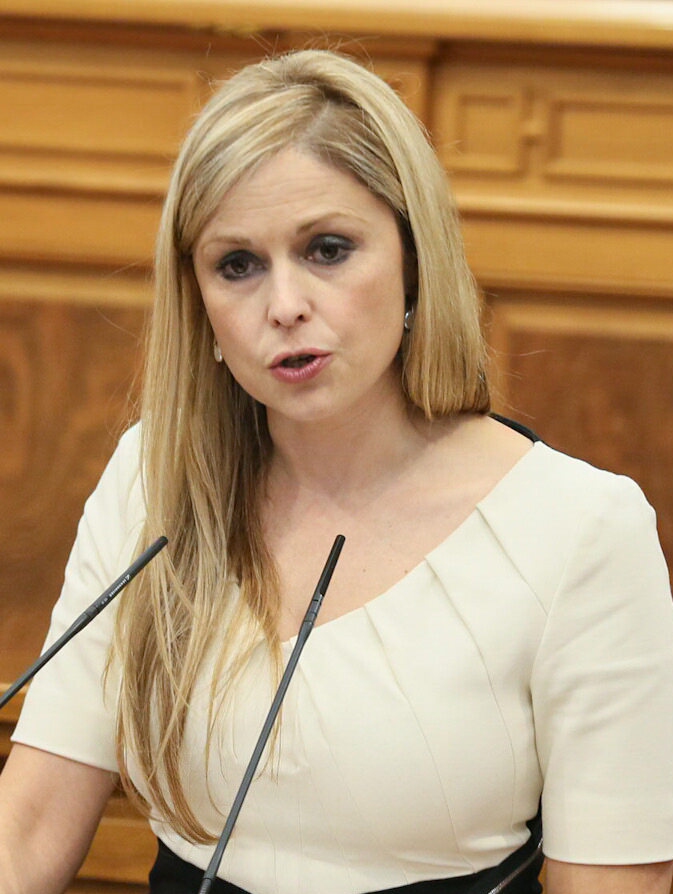

Elena de la Cruz Martín was the Minister of the Public Works of Castilla-La Mancha from July 2015 until her death on April 4, 2017.

== Biography ==
Elena de la Cruz was born in Madrid on June 23, 1972. She lived her youth in the Madrid neighborhood of Linear City with her parents and her siblings Marga and Julio. She was married to Óscar Sánchez and had a daughter, Daniela. She married her husband on May 1, 2004 in Santa María la Mayor and three years later her daughter was born. As an adult she lived in Cabanillas del Campo with her family.

De la Cruz was part of the Spanish Socialist Workers’ Party (PSOE). She graduated in Fine Arts from the Complutense University of Madrid and specialized in Design and Architecture at the Polytechnic University of Madrid. She was also director of the School of Art of Guadalajara.

=== Career and Time as Minister ===
Before working for the government, Elena de la Cruz worked as a professor at the School of Art of Guadalajara. In May 2015, after the electoral victory of Emiliano Garcia-Page, De la Cruz joined the government of Castilla-La Mancha as Minister of Public Works.

During her time as Minister of Public Works she was characterized by a moderate style and focused on the execution of her infrastructure plans and the “battle for water.” One of her principle priorities as Minister of Public Works was to fight against the Tagus-Segura Water Transfer.

=== Political Objectives ===
One of the most important issues of her time as Minister was the Tagus-Segura Water Transfer. The Tagus-Segura Water Transfer brought water from the Tagus River (Guadalajara province) to the Segura River (Cuenca province) and is one of the greatest works of hydraulic engineering ever created in Spain. De la Cruz wanted to reduce the pressure on the Tagus-Segura and wanted the state to create new structural mechanisms to provide the water consumed in the southeast part of Spain. By doing so, she believed that the river would be able to return to an “ideal environmental state.”

Related to the Tagus-Segura Water Transfer is the National Water Pact, which impacted the negotiations surrounding the Transfer. De la Cruz had said that Castilla-La Mancha (the community she represented) was “anxious and impatient” to initiate talks about the National Water Pact after the national government of Spain had finally come out in support of it. However, De la Cruz said that she would not support the talks in favor of the National Water Pact if they were not accompanied by a drastic reduction in the overexploitation of the Tagus-Segura Water Transfer.

De la Cruz also fought for the replacement of water pipes that constantly broke down. The issue of water access was one of the major themes of her time as Minister. At times she was at odds with Isabel Tejerina, Spain's Minister of Agriculture, Fishers, Food and Environment. One of their disagreements was about water purification; in 2017, of the estimated 4 billion investment for all of Spain, only 1.5% was to be used for Castilla-La Mancha.

Furthermore, financial cuts and funding were some of De la Cruz’s greatest points of disappointment with the national government, as she saw that her community required much work that would never be done due to the lack of investments. For example, she had said that her region needed 547 water treatment plants, particularly in rural areas, where the treatment of water is especially important due to the possible effects on protected areas and natural parks. However, due to the lack of funding it was very unlikely that the required resources could have been given to create these treatment plants.

=== Death ===
De la Cruz died of leukemia at Virgin of Health Hospital in Toledo.
