= 2012 Spanish regional elections =

← 2011	25 March 2012; 21 October 2012; 25 November 2012	2015 →

439 seats in the regional parliaments of Andalusia, Asturias, the Basque Country, Catalonia and Galicia
Regional administrations by leading party in 2012
National parties
PP (11+2)
PSOE (2)
Regional parties
CiU (1)
EAJ/PNV (1)
CC (1)
UPN (1)

Regional elections were held in Spain during 2012 to elect the regional parliaments of five of the seventeen autonomous communities: Andalusia, Asturias, the Basque Country, Catalonia and Galicia. 439 of 1,218 seats in the regional parliaments were up for election. The elections were held on 25 March in Andalusia and Asturias, on 21 October in the Basque Country, and on 25 November in Catalonia.

== Election date ==
Determination of election day varied depending on the autonomous community. Typically, most autonomous communities held their elections on the fourth Sunday of May every four years, concurrently with nationwide local elections, while others had their own, separate electoral cycles. In some cases, regional presidents had the prerogative to dissolve parliament and call for extra elections at a different time, but newly elected assemblies were restricted to serving out what remained of their previous four year-terms without altering the period to their next ordinary election. In other cases—Andalusia (since 1994), Aragon (2007), the Balearic Islands (2007), the Basque Country (1981), Castile and León (2007), Catalonia (1985), Extremadura (2011), Galicia (1985), Navarre (2010) and the Valencian Community (2006)—the law granted regional presidents the power to call snap elections resulting in fresh four-year parliamentary terms.

== Regional governments ==
The following table lists party control in autonomous communities and cities. Gains for a party are highlighted in that party's colour.

Election day	Region	Previous control	New control
25 March	Andalusia	Spanish Socialist Workers' Party (PSOE)	Spanish Socialist Workers' Party (PSOE)
25 March	Asturias	Asturias Forum (FAC)	Spanish Socialist Workers' Party (PSOE)
21 October	Basque Country	Spanish Socialist Workers' Party (PSOE)	Basque Nationalist Party (EAJ/PNV)
21 October	Galicia	People's Party (PP)	People's Party (PP)
25 November	Catalonia	Convergence and Union (CiU)	Convergence and Union (CiU)

== Summary by region ==
=== March (2 regions) ===
==== Andalusia ====
Parties and alliances	Votes	%	±pp	Seats	+/−
PP	1,570,833	40.67	+2.22	50	+3
PSOE–A	1,527,923	39.56	−8.85	47	−9
IULV–CA	438,372	11.35	+4.29	12	+6
UPyD	129,407	3.35	+2.73	0	±0
PA	96,770	2.51	−0.25	0	±0
Others	64,361	1.67		0	±0
Blank ballots	35,081	0.91	−0.15		
Valid votes	3,862,747	99.42	+0.05		
Invalid votes	22,390	0.58	−0.05		
Votes cast / turnout	3,885,137	60.78	−11.89		
Registered voters	6,392,620				

==== Asturias ====
Parties and alliances	Votes	%	±pp	Seats	+/−
PSOE	161,159	32.10	+2.18	17	+2
FAC	124,518	24.80	−4.86	12	−4
PP	108,091	21.53	+1.58	10	±0
IU/IX	69,118	13.77	+3.49	5	+1
UPyD	18,801	3.74	+1.30	1	+1
Others	13,220	2.63		0	±0
Blank ballots	7,166	1.43	−1.17		
Valid votes	502,073	99.15	+0.59		
Invalid votes	4,295	0.85	−0.59		
Votes cast / turnout	506,368	51.15	−10.54		
Registered voters	989,993				

=== October (2 regions) ===
==== Basque Country ====
Parties and alliances	Votes	%	±pp	Seats	+/−
EAJ/PNV	384,766	34.16	−3.98	27	−3
EH Bildu	277,923	24.67	+15.05	21	+16
PSE–EE (PSOE)	212,809	18.89	−11.47	16	−9
PP	130,584	11.59	−2.36	10	−3
IU–LV	30,318	2.69	New	0	±0
UPyD	21,539	1.91	−0.21	1	±0
EB–B	17,345	1.54	−1.93	0	−1
Equo	11,625	1.03	+0.49	0	±0
EB/AZ	11,480	1.02	New	0	±0
Others	13,371	1.19		0	±0
Blank ballots	14,640	1.30	+0.20		
Valid votes	1,126,400	99.18	+7.98		
Invalid votes	9,168	0.81	−7.98		
Votes cast / turnout	1,135,568	63.96	−0.72		
Registered voters	1,775,351				

==== Galicia ====
Parties and alliances	Votes	%	±pp	Seats	+/−
PP	661,281	45.80	−0.88	41	+3
PSdeG–PSOE	297,584	20.61	−10.41	18	−7
AGE	200,828	13.91	+12.94	9	+9
BNG	146,027	10.11	−5.90	7	−5
UPyD	21,335	1.48	+0.07	0	±0
EB	17,141	1.19	New	0	±0
SCD	15,990	1.11	New	0	±0
CxG	14,586	1.01	−0.10	0	±0
Others	30,628	2.12		0	±0
Blank ballots	38,448	2.66	+1.00		
Valid votes	1,443,848	97.47	−1.64		
Invalid votes	37,531	2.53	+1.64		
Votes cast / turnout	1,481,379	54.91	−9.52		
Registered voters	2,697,717				

=== November (Catalonia) ===
Parties and alliances	Votes	%	±pp	Seats	+/−
CiU	1,116,259	30.71	−7.72	50	−12
PSC–PSOE	524,707	14.43	−3.95	20	−8
ERC–CatSí	498,124	13.70	+6.70	21	+11
PP	471,681	12.98	+0.61	19	+1
ICV–EUiA	359,705	9.90	+2.53	13	+3
C's	275,007	7.57	+4.18	9	+6
CUP	126,435	3.48	New	3	+3
PxC	60,107	1.65	−0.75	0	±0
SI	46,838	1.29	−2.00	0	−4
Others	103,409	2.84		0	±0
Blank ballots	52,898	1.46	−1.47		
Valid votes	3,635,170	99.10	−0.19		
Invalid votes	33,140	0.90	+0.19		
Votes cast / turnout	3,668,310	67.76	+8.98		
Registered voters	5,413,868				

== Bibliography ==
- Ley Orgánica 5/1985, de 19 de junio, del Régimen Electoral General (Organic Law 5/1985). Official State Gazette (in Spanish). 19 June 1985 [version as of 16 July 2011]. BOE-A-1985-11672.
