= 2001 Spanish regional elections =

2005 Spanish regional elections
- 13 May 2001; 21 October 2001

150 seats in the regional parliaments of the Basque Country and Galicia
Regional administrations by leading party in 2001
National parties
PP (7+2)
PSOE (6)
Regional parties
CiU (1)
EAJ/PNV (1)
CC (1)
UPN (Note: PP's sister party in Navarre.) (1)

Regional elections were held in Spain during 2001 to elect the regional parliaments of two of the seventeen autonomous communities: the Basque Country and Galicia. 150 of 1,178 seats in the regional parliaments were up for election. The elections were held on 13 May in the Basque Country, and on 21 October in Galicia.

== Election date ==
Determination of election day varied depending on the autonomous community. Typically, most autonomous communities held their elections on the fourth Sunday of May every four years, concurrently with nationwide local elections, while others had their own, separate electoral cycles. In some cases, regional presidents had the prerogative to dissolve parliament and call for extra elections at a different time, but newly elected assemblies were restricted to serving out what remained of their previous four year-terms without altering the period to their next ordinary election. In other cases—Andalusia (since 1994), the Basque Country (1981), Catalonia (1985) and Galicia (1985)—the law granted regional presidents the power to call snap elections resulting in fresh four-year parliamentary terms.

== Regional governments ==
The following table lists party control in autonomous communities and cities. Gains for a party are highlighted in that party's colour.

Election day	Region	Previous control	New control
13 May	Basque Country	Basque Nationalist Party (EAJ/PNV)	Basque Nationalist Party (EAJ/PNV)
21 October	Galicia	People's Party (PP)	People's Party (PP)

== Summary by region ==
=== May (Basque Country) ===
Parties and alliances	Votes	%	±pp	Seats	+/−
PNV–EA	604,222	42.38	+6.19	33	+6
PP	326,933	22.93	+1.84	19	+1
PSE–EE (PSOE)	253,195	17.76	+0.41	13	−1
EH	143,139	10.04	−7.62	7	−7
IU/EB	78,862	5.53	−0.07	3	+1
Others	7,918	0.56		0	±0
Blank ballots	11,508	0.81	−0.58		
Valid votes	1,425,777	99.57	+0.10		
Invalid votes	6,219	0.43	−0.10		
Votes cast / turnout	1,431,996	78.97	+8.98		
Registered voters	1,813,356				

=== October (Galicia) ===
Parties and alliances	Votes	%	±pp	Seats	+/−
PP	791,885	51.62	−0.57	41	−1
BNG	346,430	22.58	−2.20	17	−1
PSdeG–PSOE	334,819	21.83	+2.37	17	+2
Others	34,810	2.27		0	±0
Blank ballots	25,988	1.69	+0.38		
Valid votes	1,533,932	99.30	−0.20		
Invalid votes	10,755	0.70	+0.20		
Votes cast / turnout	1,544,687	60.16	−2.35		
Registered voters	2,567,670				

== Bibliography ==
- Ley Orgánica 5/1985, de 19 de junio, del Régimen Electoral General (Organic Law 5/1985). Official State Gazette (in Spanish). 19 June 1985 [version as of 30 June 2000]. BOE-A-1985-11672.
