= 2024 Spanish regional elections =

- 18 February 2024; 21 April 2024; 12 May 2024

285 seats in the regional parliaments of the Basque Country, Catalonia and Galicia
Regional administrations by leading party in 2024
National parties
PP (11+2)
PSOE (3)
Regional parties
PSC (Note: PSOE's sister party in Catalonia.) (1)
EAJ/PNV (1)
CCa (1)

Regional elections were held in Spain during 2024 to elect the regional parliaments of three of the seventeen autonomous communities: the Basque Country, Catalonia and Galicia. 285 of 1,211 seats in the regional parliaments were up for election. The elections were held on 18 February in Galicia, on 21 April in the Basque Country, and on 12 May in Catalonia.

== Election date ==
Determination of election day varied depending on the autonomous community. Typically, most autonomous communities held their elections on the fourth Sunday of May every four years, concurrently with nationwide local elections, while others had their own, separate electoral cycles. In some cases, regional presidents had the prerogative to dissolve parliament and call for extra elections at a different time, but newly elected assemblies were restricted to serving out what remained of their previous four year-terms without altering the period to their next ordinary election. In other cases—Andalusia (since 1994), Aragon (2007), the Balearic Islands (2007), the Basque Country (1981), the Canary Islands (2018), Castile and León (2007), Catalonia (1985), Extremadura (2011), Galicia (1985), Navarre (2010) and the Valencian Community (2006)—the law granted regional presidents the power to call snap elections resulting in fresh four-year parliamentary terms.

== Regional governments ==
The following table lists party control in autonomous communities and cities. Gains for a party are highlighted in that party's colour.

| Election day | Region | Previous control | New control |
|---|---|---|---|
| 18 February | Galicia | People's Party (PP) | People's Party (PP) |
| 21 April | Basque Country | Basque Nationalist Party (EAJ/PNV) | Basque Nationalist Party (EAJ/PNV) |
| 12 May | Catalonia | Republican Left of Catalonia (ERC) | Socialists' Party of Catalonia (PSC–PSOE) |

== Summary by region ==
=== February (Galicia) ===
| Parties and alliances | Votes | % | ±pp | Seats | +/− |
|---|---|---|---|---|---|
| PP | 711,713 | 47.39 | −0.57 | 40 | −2 |
| BNG | 470,692 | 31.34 | +7.55 | 25 | +6 |
| PSdeG–PSOE | 211,361 | 14.07 | −5.32 | 9 | −5 |
| Vox | 34,045 | 2.27 | +0.22 | 0 | ±0 |
| Sumar Galicia | 29,009 | 1.93 | n/a | 0 | ±0 |
| DO | 15,442 | 1.03 | New | 1 | +1 |
| Others | 16,443 | 1.09 | | 0 | ±0 |
| Blank ballots | 13,052 | 0.87 | –0.03 | | |
| Valid votes | 1,501,757 | 99.06 | –0.03 | | |
| Invalid votes | 14,187 | 0.94 | +0.03 | | |
| Votes cast / turnout | 1,515,944 | 56.27 | +7.30 | | |
| Registered voters | 2,693,816 | | | | |

=== April (Basque Country) ===
| Parties and alliances | Votes | % | ±pp | Seats | +/− |
|---|---|---|---|---|---|
| EAJ/PNV | 372,456 | 34.82 | −3.88 | 27 | −4 |
| EH Bildu | 343,609 | 32.13 | +4.53 | 27 | +6 |
| PSE–EE (PSOE) | 150,752 | 14.09 | +0.57 | 12 | +2 |
| PP | 98,144 | 9.18 | +2.47 | 7 | +1 |
| Sumar | 35,402 | 3.31 | n/a | 1 | −1 |
| Podemos/Ahal Dugu–AV | 23,888 | 2.23 | n/a | 0 | −4 |
| Vox | 21,696 | 2.03 | +0.05 | 1 | ±0 |
| Others | 13,127 | 0.52 | | 0 | ±0 |
| Blank ballots | 10,523 | 0.98 | +0.04 | | |
| Valid votes | 1,069,597 | 99.27 | +0.01 | | |
| Invalid votes | 7,859 | 0.73 | –0.01 | | |
| Votes cast / turnout | 1,077,456 | 60.02 | +9.24 | | |
| Registered voters | 1,795,213 | | | | |

=== May (Catalonia) ===
| Parties and alliances | Votes | % | ±pp | Seats | +/− |
|---|---|---|---|---|---|
| PSC–PSOE | 882,589 | 27.96 | +4.93 | 42 | +9 |
| Cat–Junts+ | 681,470 | 21.59 | +1.52 | 35 | +3 |
| ERC | 431,128 | 13.66 | −7.64 | 20 | −13 |
| PP | 347,170 | 11.00 | +7.15 | 15 | +12 |
| Vox | 251,096 | 7.95 | +0.28 | 11 | ±0 |
| Comuns Sumar | 184,297 | 5.84 | −1.03 | 6 | −2 |
| CUP–DT | 129,059 | 4.09 | −2.59 | 4 | −5 |
| Aliança.cat | 119,149 | 3.77 | New | 2 | +2 |
| PACMA | 34,493 | 1.09 | New | 0 | ±0 |
| Cs | 22,947 | 0.73 | −4.85 | 0 | −6 |
| Others | 37,105 | 1.18 | | 0 | ±0 |
| Blank ballots | 35,967 | 1.14 | +0.29 | | |
| Valid votes | 3,156,470 | 99.16 | +0.60 | | |
| Invalid votes | 26,667 | 0.84 | –0.60 | | |
| Votes cast / turnout | 3,183,137 | 55.31 | +4.02 | | |
| Registered voters | 5,754,952 | | | | |

== Bibliography ==
- Ley Orgánica 5/1985, de 19 de junio, del Régimen Electoral General (Organic Law 5/1985). Official State Gazette (in Spanish). 19 June 1985 [version as of 2 February 2024]. BOE-A-1985-11672.
