= 2009 Spanish regional elections =

- 1 March 2009

150 seats in the regional parliaments of the Basque Country and Galicia
Regional administrations by leading party in 2009
National parties
PSOE (7)
PP (6+2)
Regional parties
PSC (Note: PSOE's sister party in Catalonia.) (1)
CC (1)
UPN (1)
PRC (1)

Regional elections were held in Spain during 2009 to elect the regional parliaments of two of the seventeen autonomous communities: the Basque Country and Galicia. 150 of 1,206 seats in the regional parliaments were up for election. The elections were held on 1 March in both regions.

== Election date ==
Determination of election day varied depending on the autonomous community. Typically, most autonomous communities held their elections on the fourth Sunday of May every four years, concurrently with nationwide local elections, while others had their own, separate electoral cycles. In some cases, regional presidents had the prerogative to dissolve parliament and call for extra elections at a different time, but newly elected assemblies were restricted to serving out what remained of their previous four year-terms without altering the period to their next ordinary election. In other cases—Andalusia (since 1994), Aragon (2007), the Balearic Islands (2007), the Basque Country (1981), Castile and León (2007), Catalonia (1985), Galicia (1985) and the Valencian Community (2006)—the law granted regional presidents the power to call snap elections resulting in fresh four-year parliamentary terms.

== Regional governments ==
The following table lists party control in autonomous communities and cities. Gains for a party are highlighted in that party's colour.

Election day	Region	Previous control	New control
1 March	Basque Country	Basque Nationalist Party (EAJ/PNV)	Spanish Socialist Workers' Party (PSOE)
1 March	Galicia	Spanish Socialist Workers' Party (PSOE)	People's Party (PP)

== Summary by region ==
=== March (2 regions) ===
==== Basque Country ====
Parties and alliances	Votes	%	±pp	Seats	+/−
EAJ/PNV	399,600	38.14	n/a	30	+8
PSE–EE (PSOE)	318,112	30.36	+7.85	25	+7
PP	146,148	13.95	−3.32	13	−2
Aralar	62,514	5.97	+3.66	4	+3
EA	38,198	3.65	n/a	1	−6
EB–B	36,373	3.47	−1.86	1	−2
UPyD	22,233	2.12	New	1	+1
PCTV/EHAK	n/a	n/a	−12.35	0	−9
Others	13,018	1.24		0	±0
Blank ballots	11,562	1.10	+0.36		
Valid votes	1,047,758	91.21	−8.46		
Invalid votes	100,939	8.79	+8.46		
Votes cast / turnout	1,148,697	64.68	−3.32		
Registered voters	1,776,059				

==== Galicia ====
Parties and alliances	Votes	%	±pp	Seats	+/−
PP	789,427	46.68	+1.45	38	+1
PSdeG–PSOE	524,488	31.02	−2.20	25	±0
BNG	270,712	16.01	−2.64	12	−1
UPyD	23,796	1.41	New	0	±0
TeGa	18,726	1.11	New	0	±0
Others	35,755	2.11		0	±0
Blank ballots	28,071	1.66	+0.41		
Valid votes	1,690,975	99.11	−0.43		
Invalid votes	15,223	0.89	+0.43		
Votes cast / turnout	1,706,198	64.43	+0.22		
Registered voters	2,648,276				

== Bibliography ==
- Ley Orgánica 5/1985, de 19 de junio, del Régimen Electoral General (Organic Law 5/1985). Official State Gazette (in Spanish). 19 June 1985 [version as of 22 January 2009]. BOE-A-1985-11672.
