= Regional Government of Castilla–La Mancha =

Regional Government of Castilla–La Mancha Junta de Comunidades de Castilla–La Mancha (Spanish)
- Seal of Castilla–La Mancha

Collective institutions overview
- Formed: 1982
- Jurisdiction: Castilla–La Mancha
- Headquarters: Palace of Fuensalida
- Minister responsible: Emiliano García-Page, President
- Website: castillamancha.es

The Regional Government of Castilla–La Mancha (Spanish: Junta de Comunidades de Castilla–La Mancha) is the institution whereby the government of the autonomous community of Castilla–La Mancha, Spain, is organized. It is integrated by the:

- Cortes of Castilla–La Mancha (the parliament)
- the President of Castile–La Mancha; and
- the Council of Government (the executive).

The Cortes of Castilla–La Mancha are the legislative assembly of the autonomous community, in charge of creating legislation and appointing or dismissing the President of the Regional Government. The President is the representative of the autonomous community, usually the leader of the party or coalition with the majority of seats in the assembly. The President heads the Council of Government, the organization in charge of the executive branch of government. It is integrated by several councilors appointed by the President.

== Name ==
The name of the Regional Government in Castilian language (Junta de Comunidades) makes reference to two historic moments of the Castilian and Spanish history.

Comunidades refers to the municipal councils that rebel against Emperor Charles V at the beginning of the 16th century on claims of misgovernment and foreign influence. The term thus refers to the municipal administration as a public body, a "Commonwealth", rather than the sum up of people ("Community").

Junta was the name used by the revolutionary councils that organised the Spanish resistance in front of French Napoleonic occupation. The exact translation being "meeting", it is a name chosen by several Spanish Autonomous Communities for its regional government.

So, the complete name could roughly translate as United Commonwealths of Castile–La Mancha. Although this expression is almost never used by the Junta de Comunidades when producing communication materials in English, preferring to leave the term in Castilian or use the more understandable expression "Regional Government".

== See also ==
- Second García-Page Government (incumbent)
