= María Antonia Martínez =

Spanish politician

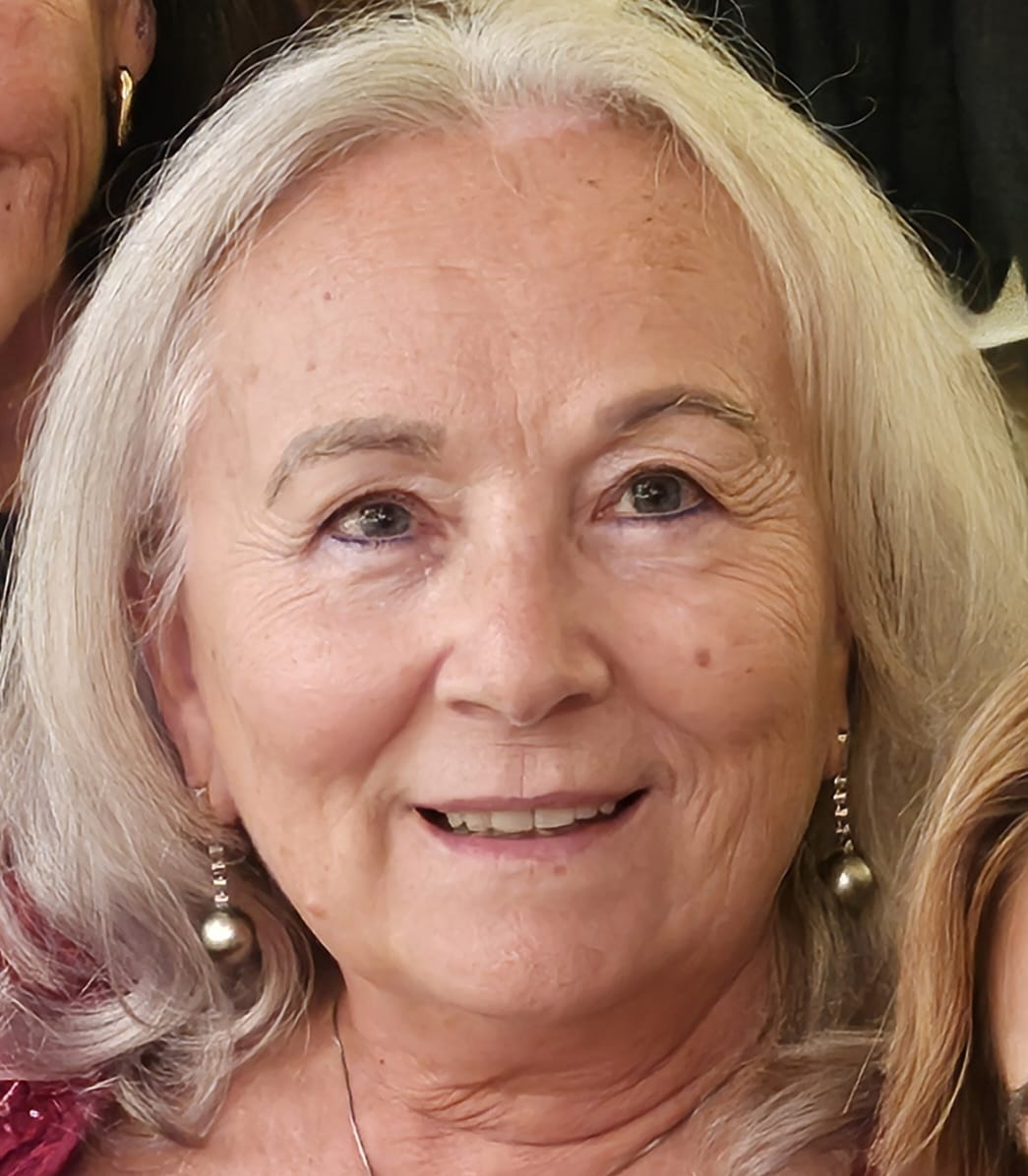

President of the Region of Murcia
- In office 28 April 1993 – 26 June 1995
- Preceded by: Carlos Collado
- Succeeded by: Ramón Luis Valcárcel

Personal details
- Born: María Antonia Martínez García; May 18, 1953 Molina de Segura, Region of Murcia, Spain
- Party: PSOE

María Antonia Martínez García (born 18 May 1953) is a Spanish politician and member of the Spanish Socialist Workers' Party (PSOE) from the Region of Murcia who served as the third President of the Region of Murcia from April 1993 to June 1995, the first woman to serve as regional president in Spain.
