= Taller del Moro =

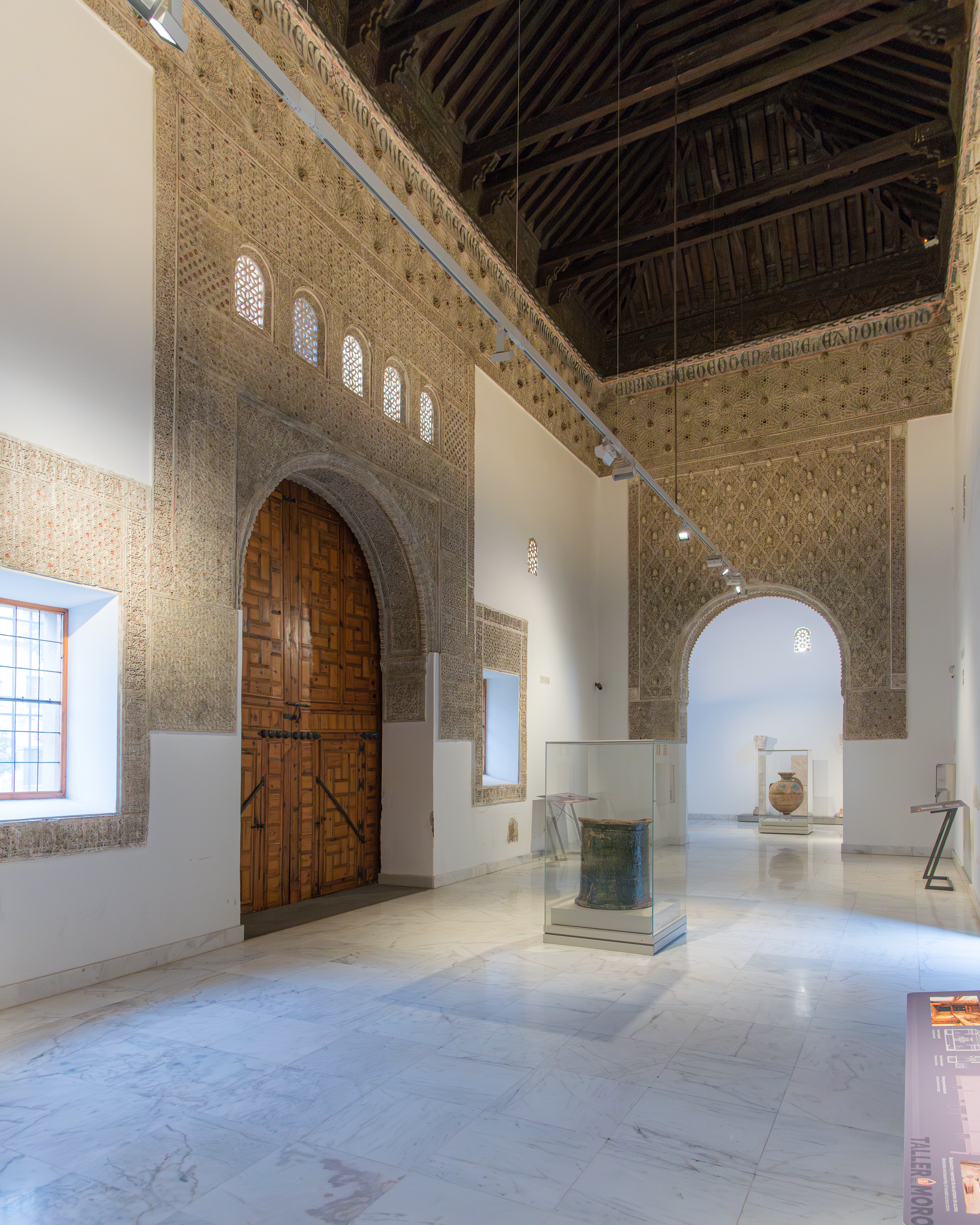
Overview of the main room

The Taller del Moro (Spanish for: Workshop of the Moor) is a museum located in the city of Toledo, in Castile-La Mancha, Spain. It is housed in an old Mudéjar palace from the 14th century, and houses samples of Mudéjar art and crafts from the 14th and 15th centuries. Its name is because, according to the tradition, this place served during the Middle Ages of warehouse and repair shop of the materials for the factory of the Cathedral.

The centerpiece is dedicated to the collection of ceramic and Toledan Mudéjar azulejos in the 14th and 15th centuries. In the room on the right there are exhibitions of wood handicrafts, especially those used in the old houses, such as beams, friezes, canecillos and carved tablets. Finally, the left alcove is dedicated to the archaeological remains and keeps tombstones, cipos, Cordoban capitales and arcas of the time.
