= José Luis Martínez Guijarro =

Spanish politician (born 1968)

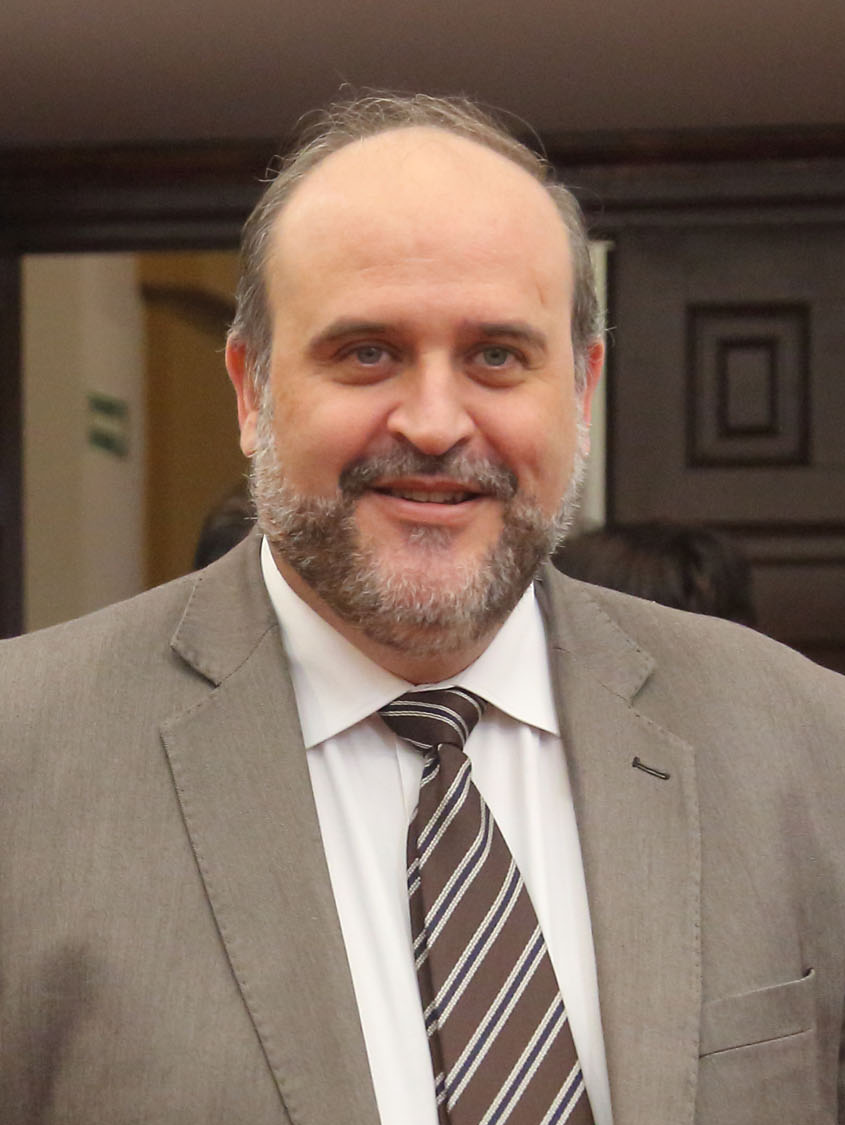
- Martínez in 2017

Vice President of Castilla–La Mancha
- Incumbent
- Assumed office 5 July 2015
- President: Emiliano García-Page

Personal details
- Born: 16 June 1968 (age 57)
- Party: Spanish Socialist Workers' Party

José Luis Martínez Guijarro (born 16 June 1968) is a Spanish politician serving as vice president of Castilla–La Mancha since 2015. From 2008 to 2011, he served as minister of agriculture and environment of Castilla–La Mancha. From 2005 to 2008, he served as minister of environment and rural development. He has been a member of the Cortes of Castilla–La Mancha since 2003.
