= 2000 in association football =

The following are the association football events of the year 2000 throughout the world.

== Events ==
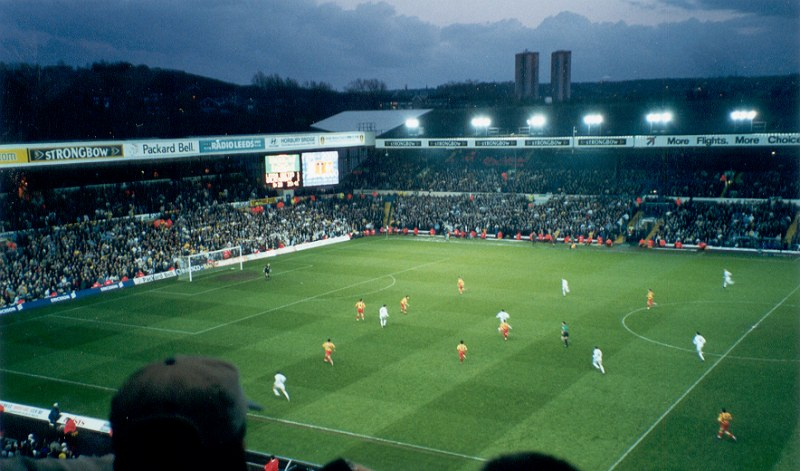
Leeds United face Galatasaray at Elland Road on 20 April in the UEFA Cup

- January 1 – Ronald Koeman starts as manager at Dutch club Vitesse.
- UEFA Euro 2000: France won 2–1 in extra time over Italy, with a golden goal by David Trezeguet. This was France's second European Championship title.
- 2006 FIFA World Cup: Germany wins the right to host for second time the event.
- UEFA Champions League: Spanish giants Real Madrid and Valencia faced off in the first ever all-country European cup final with Madrid winning 3–0. This was Real Madrid's eighth European Cup title.
- Copa Libertadores 2000: Won by Boca Juniors after defeating Palmeiras 4–3 on a penalty shootout after a final aggregate score of 2–2.
- 2000 FIFA Club World Championship: Corinthians beat Vasco da Gama 4–3 on penalties after a 0–0 draw.
- UEFA Cup: Galatasaray wins 4–1 on penalties in the final against Arsenal after a 0–0 draw at the end of the match. This was the first European title won by a Turkish team.
- UEFA Super Cup: Galatasaray beats Real Madrid 2–1 after extra time with a golden goal by Mário Jardel.
- March 21 – Ajax appoints Hans Westerhof as caretaker-manager after the resignation of Jan Wouters.
- March 31 – Gerard van der Lem resigns as manager of AZ
- May 20 – Chelsea wins the FA Cup by a 1–0 win over Aston Villa.
- July 24 – Real Madrid signs Barcelona's Portuguese star Luís Figo for a then world record transfer fee of €60 million.
- August 13 – PSV wins the Johan Cruyff Shield, the annual opening of the new season in the Eredivisie, by a 2–0 win over Roda JC at the Amsterdam Arena.
- August 15 – The Parkstad Limburg Stadion is officially opened with a friendly between home club Roda JC and Spanish side Real Zaragoza (2–2).
- September 2 – Louis van Gaal makes his debut as the manager of Netherlands national team with a draw (2–2) in the World Cup qualifier against the Republic of Ireland. Two PSV players make their debut as well: striker Arnold Bruggink and defender Wilfred Bouma.
- November 28 – Boca Juniors wins the Intercontinental Cup in Tokyo for the second time, defeating Spain's Real Madrid 2–1; Martín Palermo scores both goals for the Argentinian club.

== Winner national club championship ==
=== Asia ===
- Japan – Kashima Antlers
- Qatar – Al-Sadd
- Singapore – Anyang LG Cheetahs
- South Korea – Anyang LG
- Thailand – BEC Tero Sasana

=== Europe ===
- Croatia – Dinamo Zagreb
- Denmark – Herfølge BK
- England – Manchester United
- France – Monaco
- Germany – Bayern Munich
- Greece – Olympiacos
- Iceland – KR
- Republic of Ireland – Shelbourne
- Italy – Lazio
- Netherlands – PSV
- Northern Ireland – Linfield
- Poland – Polonia Warsaw
- Portugal – Sporting CP
- Scotland – Celtic
- Spain – Deportivo La Coruña
- Turkey – Galatasaray
- Wales – The New Saints
- FR Yugoslavia – Red Star Belgrade

=== North America ===
- Canada – Toronto Croatia (CPSL)
- Mexico
  - Verano – Toluca
  - Invierno – Morelia
- United States – Kansas City Wizards (MLS)

=== South America ===
- Argentina
  - Clausura – River Plate
  - Apertura – Boca Juniors
- Bolivia – Jorge Wilstermann
- Brazil – Vasco da Gama (Copa João Havelange)
- Chile – Universidad de Chile
- Ecuador – Olmedo
- Paraguay – Olimpia Asunción
- Peru – Universitario de Deportes

== International tournaments ==
- African Cup of Nations in Ghana and Nigeria (January 22 – February 13, 2000)
  1. Cameroon
  2. Nigeria
  3. South Africa
- 2000 CONCACAF Gold Cup in United States (February 12 – February 27, 2000)
  1. Canada
  2. Colombia
  3. —
- UEFA European Football Championship in Belgium and the Netherlands (June 10 – July 2, 2000)
  1. France
  2. Italy
  3. —
- Olympic Games in Sydney, Australia (September 13 – 30 2000)
  - Men's Tournament
  1. Cameroon
  2. Spain
  3. Chile
  - Women's Tournament
  1. Norway
  2. United States
  3. Germany
- 2000 AFC Asian Cup in Lebanon (October 12 – October 29, 2000)
  1. Japan
  2. Saudi Arabia
  3. South Korea

== Births ==
- January 14 – Jonathan David, Canadian soccer player
- January 26 – Abel Ruiz, Spanish footballer
- January 27 – Aurélien Tchouaméni, French footballer
- February 15 – Jakub Kiwior, Polish footballer
- February 20 – Josh Sargent, American soccer player
- February 22 – Timothy Weah, American soccer player
- February 24 – Antony, Brazilian footballer
- February 28 – Moise Kean, Italian footballer
- February 29 – Ferran Torres, Spanish international
- March 21 – Matty Longstaff, English footballer
- March 25
  - Ozan Kabak, Turkish footballer
  - Jadon Sancho, English footballer
- April 2 – Josip Stanišić, Croatian footballer
- April 6 – Maxence Lacroix, French youth international
- April 13 – David Moreno, Venezuelan footballer
- April 19 – Azzedine Ounahi, Moroccan footballer
- April 25 – Dejan Kulusevski, Swedish footballer
- April 26 – Nika Šapek, Slovenian footballer
- May 8 – Sandro Tonali, Italian footballer
- May 18 – Ryan Sessegnon, English youth international
- May 24
  - Leswis Landaeta, Venezuelan footballer
  - Noah Okafor, Swiss footballer
- May 28 – Phil Foden, English footballer
- May 30 – Fábio Vieira, Portuguese footballer
- June 9 – Diego Lainez, Mexican footballer
- June 27 – Marcus Lindberg, Danish footballer
- June 28 – Yukinari Sugawara, Japanese footballer
- June 29 – Petro Dolhov, Ukrainian professional footballer
- July 6 – Michael Obafemi, Irish footballer
- July 12 – Vinícius Júnior, Brazilian footballer
- July 21 – Erling Haaland, Norwegian footballer
- July 28
  - Keito Nakamura, Japanese youth international
  - Lee O'Connor, Irish youth international
  - Emile Smith Rowe, English youth international
- August 29 – Julia Grosso, Canadian international
- August 31 – Angel Gomes, English footballer
- September 3 – Lyle Foster, South African footballer
- September 11 – Enzo Valentim, French professional footballer
- September 27 – Liberato Cacace, New Zealand international
- September 29 – Giorgi Mamardashvili, Georgian international
- October 20 – Dominik Szoboszlai, Hungarian footballer
- November 2 – Alphonso Davies, Canadian international
- November 3 – Sergiño Dest, American soccer player
- November 7 – Callum Hudson-Odoi, English international

== Deaths ==
=== January ===
- January 27 – Lucas Sebastião da Fonseca (72), Mozambican-born Portuguese footballer
- January 29 – Heinz Flotho, German international footballer (born 1915)
- January 29 – Harry Thompson, English footballer (born 1915)

=== February ===
- February 23 – Sir Stanley Matthews (85), English footballer
- February 23 – Dennis Evans (69), English footballer

=== March ===
- March 24 - George Kirby (66), English footballer

=== April ===
- April 4 – Brandãozinho, Brazilian defender, Brazilian squad member at the 1954 FIFA World Cup. (74)
- April 8 – Moacir Barbosa Nascimento, Brazilian goalkeeper, runner-up at the 1950 FIFA World Cup. (79)
- April 14 – Wilf Mannion (81), English footballer
- April 23 – Felipe (Felipe Ferreira da Cruz), Brazilian footballer
- April 24 - Chic Brodie (63), Scottish footballer

=== May ===
- May 1 – Cláudio Christovam de Pinho, Brazilian striker, the biggest scorer of all time for Sport Club Corinthians Paulista. (77)
- May 18 – Domingos da Guia, Brazilian defender, semi-finalist at the 1938 FIFA World Cup. (87)
- May 24 – Adsson (Adsson Igor Marinho de Lima), Brazilian footballer
- May 31 – Rodolfo Pini, Uruguayan midfielder, winner of the 1950 FIFA World Cup. (74)

=== July ===
- July 15 – Kalle Svensson (74), Swedish footballer
- July 24 – Peter Dubovský (28), Slovak footballer
- July 29 – Benny Fenton (81), English footballer

=== August ===
- August 15 – Eduardo Luján Manera (55), Argentine footballer and manager
- August 18 – Maurice Evans (63), English footballer
- August 24 – Bob McPhail (94), Scottish footballer

=== October ===
- October 2 – Elek Schwartz (91), Romanian footballer
- October 5 – Cătălin Hâldan (24), Romanian footballer

=== November ===
- November 1 – George Armstrong (56), English footballer and coach
- November 2 – Simeon Simeonov (54), Bulgarian football goalkeeper
- November 15 – Pietro Pasinati, Italian striker, winner of the 1938 FIFA World Cup. (90)
- November 25 – Canito (44), Spanish footballer
- November 27 - Willie Cunnigham (75), Scottish footballer

=== December ===
- December 21 – Décio Esteves, Brazilian midfielder, runner up at the 1959 South American Championship (Argentina). (73)
