= David Moreno =

David Moreno may refer to:

- David Moreno (actor), Spanish singer and actor
- David Moreno (footballer), Venezuelan footballer
- David Moreno (politician), Spanish politician
- Dave Moreno, American drummer with Puddle of Mudd
