= 2027 Castilian-Manchegan regional election =

Election in the Spanish region of Castilla–La Mancha

- 23 May 2027

All 33 seats in the Cortes of Castilla–La Mancha 17 seats needed for a majority
- Opinion polls
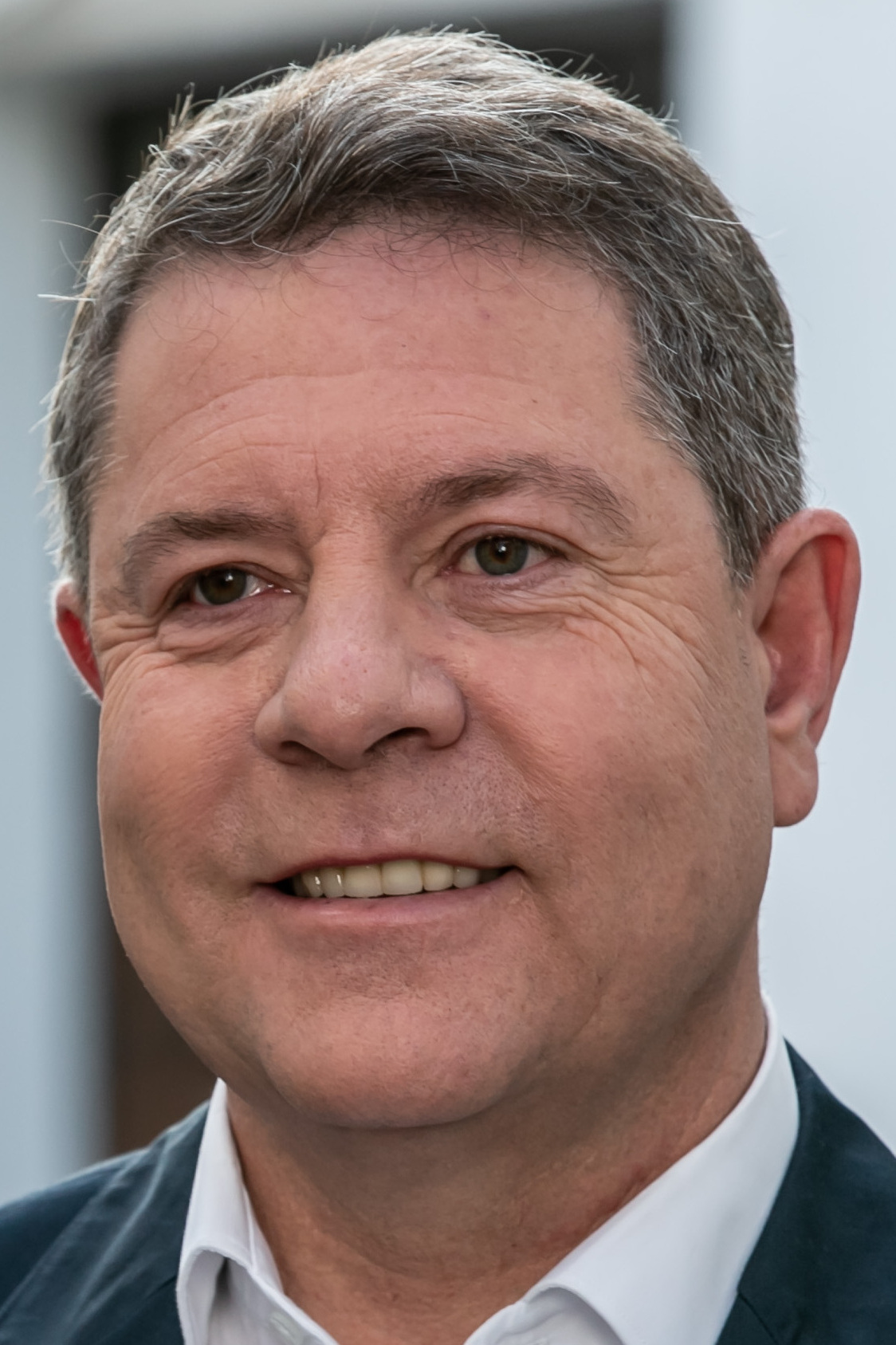

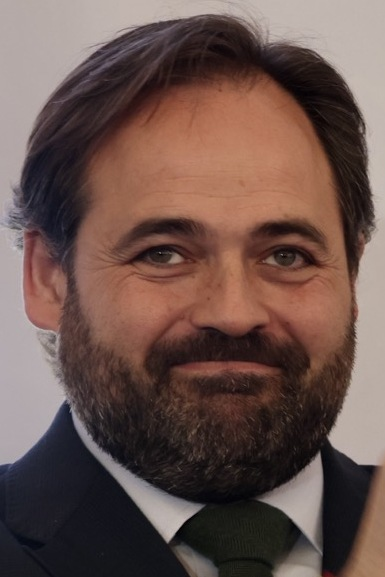

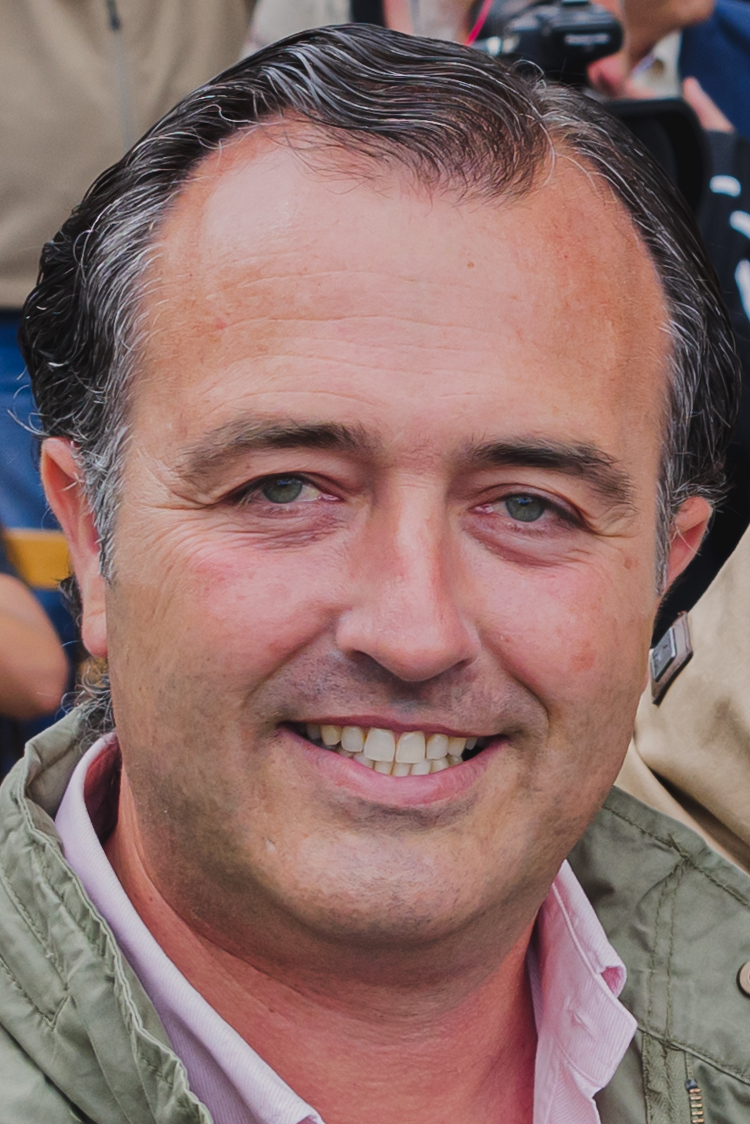
Leader	Emiliano García-Page	Francisco Núñez	David Moreno
Party	PSOE	PP	Vox
Leader since	26 February 2012	7 October 2018	26 December 2022
Leader's seat	Toledo	Toledo	Toledo
Last election	17 seats, 45.0%	12 seats, 33.7%	4 seats, 12.8%
Current seats	17	12	4
Seats needed	In majority	▲5	▲13
Incumbent President
Emiliano García-Page
PSOE

A regional election will be held in Castilla–La Mancha on 23 May 2027 to elect the 12th Cortes of the autonomous community. All 33 seats in the Cortes will be up for election. It will be held concurrently with regional elections in at least six other autonomous communities and local elections all across Spain.

== Overview ==
Under the 1982 Statute of Autonomy, the Cortes of Castilla–La Mancha is the unicameral legislature of the homonymous autonomous community, having legislative power in devolved matters, as well as the ability to grant or withdraw confidence from a regional president. The electoral and procedural rules are supplemented by national law provisions.

=== Date ===
The term of the Cortes of Castilla–La Mancha expires four years after the date of its previous election, with election day being fixed for the fourth Sunday of May every four years. The election decree shall be issued no later than 54 days before the scheduled election date and published on the following day in the Official Journal of Castilla–La Mancha (DOCM). The previous election was held on 28 May 2023, setting the date for election day on the fourth Sunday of May four years later, which is 23 May 2027.

The regional president has the prerogative to dissolve the Cortes of Castilla–La Mancha at any given time and call a snap election, provided that no motion of no confidence is in process, no nationwide election is due and some time requirements are met: namely, that dissolution does not occur either during the first legislative session or during the last year of parliament before its planned expiration, nor before one year after a previous one, with elected lawmakers serving the remainder of its original four-year term.

=== Electoral system ===
Voting for the Cortes is based on universal suffrage, comprising all Spanish nationals over 18 years of age, registered in Castilla–La Mancha and with full political rights, provided that they have not been deprived of the right to vote by a final sentence.

The Cortes has a minimum of 25 and a maximum of 35 seats, with electoral provisions fixing its size at 33. All are elected in five multi-member constituencies—corresponding to the provinces of Albacete, Ciudad Real, Cuenca, Guadalajara and Toledo, each of which is assigned an initial minimum of three seats and the remaining 18 distributed in proportion to population—using the D'Hondt method and closed-list proportional voting, with a three percent-threshold of valid votes (including blank ballots) in each constituency. The use of this electoral method may result in a higher effective threshold depending on district magnitude and vote distribution.

As a result of the aforementioned allocation, each Cortes constituency would be entitled the following seats (as of 11 December 2025): (Note: This seat allocation has been manually calculated by applying the electoral rules set out in the law, on the basis of the latest official population figures provided by the Spanish government as of 2026. As such, it should be deemed as a provisional, non-binding estimation. The definitive allocation will be determined by the election decree at the time of the parliament's dissolution.)

Seats	Constituencies
9	Toledo
7	Ciudad Real
6	Albacete^{(−1)}, Guadalajara^{(+1)}
5	Cuenca

The law does not provide for by-elections to fill vacant seats; instead, any vacancies arising after the proclamation of candidates and during the legislative term will be filled by the next candidates on the party lists or, when required, by designated substitutes.

=== Current parliament ===
The table below shows the composition of the parliamentary groups in the chamber at the present time.

Current parliamentary composition
Groups	Parties	Legislators	
Groups	Parties	Seats	Total
Socialist Parliamentary Group	PSOE	17	17
People's Parliamentary Group	PP	12	12
Vox Parliamentary Group	Vox	4	4

== Parties and candidates ==
The electoral law allows for parties and federations registered in the interior ministry, alliances and groupings of electors to present lists of candidates. Parties and federations intending to form an alliance are required to inform the relevant electoral commission within 10 days of the election call, whereas groupings of electors need to secure the signature of at least one percent of the electorate in the constituencies for which they seek election, disallowing electors from signing for more than one list. Amendments in 2024 required a balanced composition of men and women in the electoral lists through the use of a zipper system.

Below is a list of the main parties and alliances which will likely contest the election:

Candidacy	Parties and alliances	Leading candidate	Ideology	Previous result		Gov.	Ref.
Candidacy	Parties and alliances	Leading candidate	Ideology	Vote %	Seats	Gov.	Ref.
PSOE	List: Spanish Socialist Workers' Party (PSOE)	Emiliano García-Page	Social democracy	45.0%	17	Yes	
PP	List: People's Party (PP)	Francisco Núñez	Conservatism; Christian democracy	33.7%	12	No	
Vox	List: Vox (Vox)	David Moreno	Right-wing populism Ultranationalism; National conservatism	12.8%	4	No	

== Opinion polls ==
The tables below list opinion polling results in reverse chronological order, showing the most recent first and using the dates when the survey fieldwork was done, as opposed to the date of publication. Where the fieldwork dates are unknown, the date of publication is given instead. The highest percentage figure in each polling survey is displayed with its background shaded in the leading party's colour. If a tie ensues, this is applied to the figures with the highest percentages. The "Lead" column on the right shows the percentage-point difference between the parties with the highest percentages in a poll.

=== Graphical summary ===
Local regression trend line of poll results from 28 May 2023 to the present day, with each line corresponding to a political party.

=== Voting intention estimates ===
The table below lists weighted voting intention estimates. Refusals are generally excluded from the party vote percentages, while question wording and the treatment of "don't know" responses and those not intending to vote may vary between polling organisations. When available, seat projections determined by the polling organisations are displayed below (or in place of) the percentages in a smaller font; 17 seats are required for an absolute majority in the Cortes of Castilla–La Mancha.

Polling firm/Commissioner	Fieldwork date	Sample size	Turnout	PSOE	PP	Vox	Podemos	CS	Sumar	SALF	Lead
SocioMétrica/El Español	14–17 Sep 2026	1,200	?	43.3; 16/18	30.4; 11/12	15.6; 4/5	3.7; 0	–	2.7; 0	–	12.9
Sigma Dos/El Mundo	18–22 May 2026	1,227	?	40.8; 15/17	31.3; 11/12	16.8; 5/6	6.6; 0	–	–	–	9.5
NC Report/PP	6–20 May 2026	2,500	?	40.3; 15	35.1; 13	15.9; 5	1.5; 0	–	3.2; 0	–	5.2
Idus3/PSOE	11–15 May 2026	2,000	?	44.5; 18/19	27.8; 10/11	16.3; 4/5	3.9; 0	–	2.5; 0	–	16.7
NC Report/Diario Lanza	10–16 Mar 2026	800	?	41.5; 16	34.3; 12	15.8; 5	1.1; 0	–	3.7; 0	–	7.2
EM-Analytics/Electomanía	27 Nov–27 Dec 2025	1,340	?	44.3; 16	35.3; 13	14.2; 4	1.9; 0	0.3; 0	2.9; 0	–	9.0
Target Point/El Debate	17–23 Dec 2025	1,204	?	40.5; 15/16	34.7; 12/13	16.1; 5	5.7; 0	–	–	–	5.8
Sigma Dos/El Mundo	19–29 May 2025	1,032	?	47.1; 17/18	32.5; 11/12	12.5; 4	4.0; 0	–	–	–	14.6
Idus3/PSOE	12–20 May 2025	1,700	?	46.2; 18/19	32.8; 11/13	12.0; 1/3	1.5; 0	–	3.3; 0	1.3; 0	13.4
Target Point/El Debate	13–15 May 2025	1,001	?	43.2; 15/16	34.6; 13	13.4; 4/5	4.5; 0	–	–	–	8.6
Idus3/PSOE	7–10 Jan 2025	1,700	?	46.4; 17/19	31.3; 10/12	13.7; 3/4	(Note: Within Sumar.)	–	3.8; 0	–	15.1
NC Report/La Razón	25 Nov–13 Dec 2024	1,700	67.0	42.6; 15	35.2; 14	13.6; 4	3.8; 0	–	–	–	7.4
2024 EP election	9 Jun 2024	—N/a	50.3	31.7 (12)	41.5 (17)	13.0 (4)	2.2 (0)	0.6 (0)	3.0 (0)	5.0 (0)	9.8
EM-Analytics/Electomanía	30 Apr–27 May 2024	1,340	?	46.7; 19	35.7; 13	10.9; 1	0.7; 0	1.0; 0	2.7; 0	–	11.0
The Place Public Affairs/PSOE	22 Apr–10 May 2024	4,904	?	47.9; 19/20	31.2; 10/13	12.5; 1/4	–	–	5.4; 0	–	16.7
EM-Analytics/Electomanía	26 Mar–29 Apr 2024	1,340	?	47.7; 19	35.0; 13	11.4; 1	0.8; 0	0.9; 0	2.2; 0	–	12.7
EM-Analytics/Electomanía	29 Jan–26 Feb 2024	1,340	?	47.7; 19	34.7; 13	10.8; 1	0.7; 0	1.0; 0	2.9; 0	–	13.0
EM-Analytics/Electomanía	24 Dec–28 Jan 2024	1,340	?	47.4; 19	34.5; 13	11.2; 1	0.7; 0	1.0; 0	3.0; 0	–	12.9
EM-Analytics/Electomanía	25 Nov–23 Dec 2023	1,340	?	47.6; 19	34.2; 13	11.1; 1	0.7; 0	1.0; 0	3.2; 0	–	13.4
2023 general election	23 Jul 2023	—N/a	73.0	34.2 (13)	38.9 (14)	17.8 (6)		–	7.4 (0)	–	4.7
2023 regional election	28 May 2023	—N/a	69.6	45.0; 17	33.7; 12	12.8; 4	4.2; 0	1.0; 0	–	–	11.3

=== Voting preferences ===
The table below lists raw, unweighted voting preferences.

Polling firm/Commissioner	Fieldwork date	Sample size	PSOE	PP	Vox	Podemos	Sumar	SALF	Question	X mark	Lead
Idus3/PSOE	11–15 May 2026	2,000	34.8	14.3	10.0	–	–	–	–	–	20.5
Idus3/PSOE	12–20 May 2025	1,700	33.4	15.6	7.3	1.0	1.8	0.5	16.9	9.5	17.8
CIS	7–31 Mar 2025	376	43.9	16.9	8.3	3.0	2.0	2.0	15.4	5.6	27.0
Idus3/PSOE	7–10 Jan 2025	1,700	31.4	19.2	7.9		2.6	–	27.0	7.2	12.2
2024 EP election (Note: Does not include non-resident citizens.)	9 Jun 2024	—N/a	16.1	21.1	6.6	1.1	1.5	2.5	—N/a	48.6	5.0
The Place Public Affairs/PSOE	22 Apr–10 May 2024	4,904	34.5	19.1	6.9	–	2.5	–	–	–	15.4
2023 general election	23 Jul 2023	—N/a	25.1	28.6	13.1		5.4	–	—N/a	25.6	3.5
2023 regional election	28 May 2023	—N/a	31.5	23.5	9.0	2.9	–	–	—N/a	28.9	8.0

=== Preferred President ===
The table below lists opinion polling on leader preferences to become president of the Junta of Communities of Castilla–La Mancha.

Polling firm/Commissioner	Fieldwork date	Sample size				Other/ None/ Not care	Question	Lead
Polling firm/Commissioner	Fieldwork date	Sample size	Page PSOE	Núñez PP	Moreno Vox	Other/ None/ Not care	Question	Lead
SigmaDos/El Mundo	18–22 May 2026	1,227	50.7	–	–	–	–	?
Idus3/PSOE	11–15 May 2026	2,000	51.7	7.8	–	25.7	15.0	43.9
Idus3/PSOE	12–20 May 2025	1,700	57.7	10.2	–	13.1	18.0	47.5
CIS (Note: Responses denoting a party's generic candidate are aggregated to that party's main candidate/leader at the time of the poll.)	7–31 Mar 2025	376	35.4	9.8	2.7	7.4	44.9	25.6

== Bibliography ==
- Ley Orgánica 5/1985, de 19 de junio, del Régimen Electoral General (Organic Law 5/1985). Official State Gazette (in Spanish). 19 June 1985 [version as of 2 July 2026]. BOE-A-1985-11672.
- Ley Orgánica 9/1982, de 10 de agosto, de Estatuto de Autonomía de Castilla-La Mancha (Organic Law 9/1982). Official State Gazette (in Spanish). 10 August 1982 [version as of 22 May 2014]. BOE-A-1982-20820.
- Ley 5/1986, de 23 de diciembre, electoral de Castilla-La Mancha (Law 5/1986). Official State Gazette (in Spanish). 23 December 1986 [version as of 21 March 2024]. BOE-A-1987-2164.
- Ley 11/2003, de 25 de septiembre, del Gobierno y del Consejo Consultivo de Castilla-La Mancha (Law 11/2003). Official State Gazette (in Spanish). 25 September 2003 [version as of 3 July 2020]. BOE-A-2004-1974.
