= Picazo =

Picazo is a Spanish surname. Notable people with the surname include:

- Axel Picazo (born 2001), Mexican-American footballer
- Ángel Picazo (1917–1998), Spanish actor
- Carmen Picazo (born 1975), Spanish lawyer and politician
- Miguel Picazo (1927–2016), Spanish film director, screenwriter and actor

== See also ==
- El Picazo, a municipality in Cuenca, Castile-La Mancha, Spain
