= 2023 Castilian-Manchegan regional election =

Election in the Spanish region of Castilla–La Mancha

- 28 May 2023

All 33 seats in the Cortes of Castilla–La Mancha 17 seats needed for a majority
- Opinion polls
- Registered: 1,591,262 ▲1.2%
- Turnout: 1,091,741 (69.6%) ▲0.2 pp
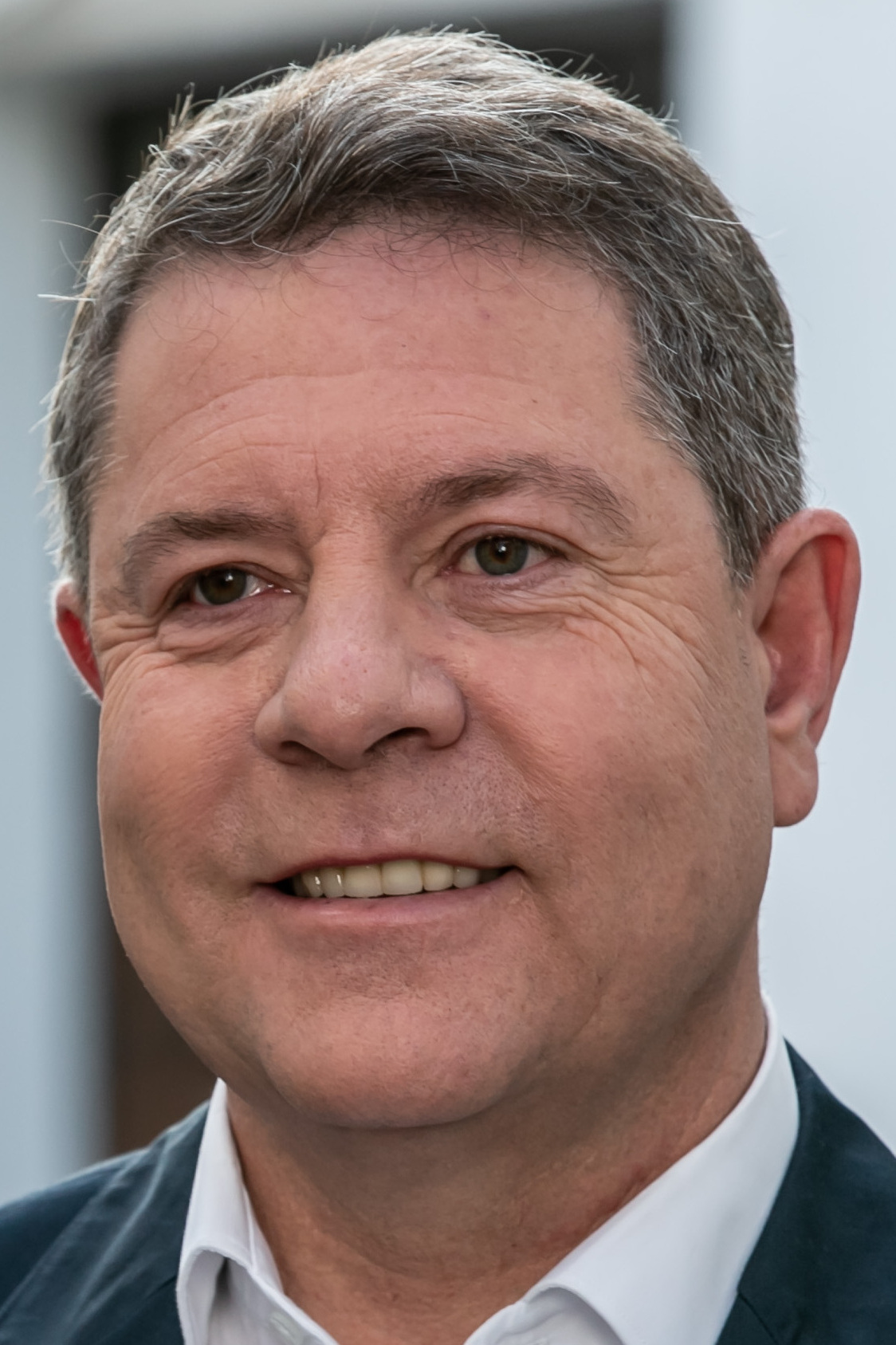

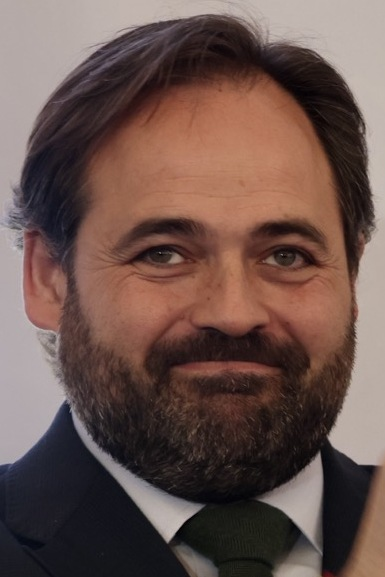

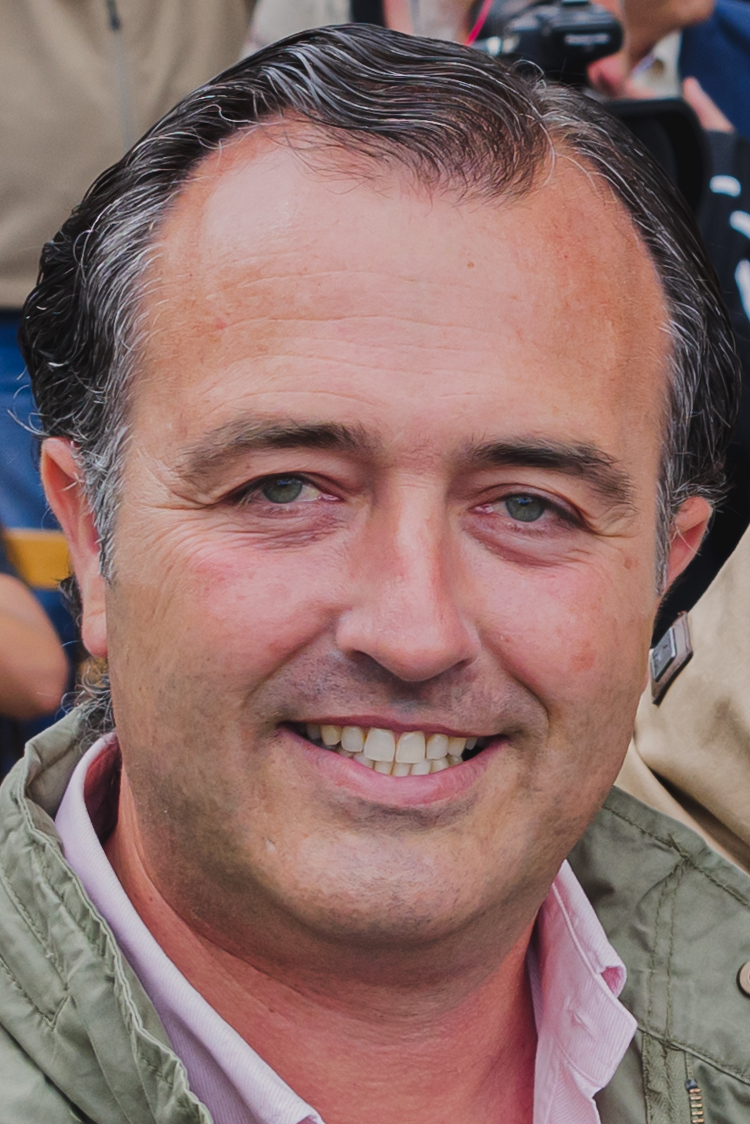
	First party	Second party	Third party
Leader	Emiliano García-Page	Francisco Núñez	David Moreno
Party	PSOE	PP	Vox
Leader since	26 February 2012	7 October 2018	26 December 2022
Leader's seat	Toledo	Toledo	Toledo
Last election	19 seats, 44.1%	10 seats, 28.5%	0 seats, 7.0%
Seats won	17	12	4
Seat change	▼2	▲2	▲4
Popular vote	490,288	361,155	137,765
Percentage	45.0%	33.7%	12.8%
Swing	▲0.9 pp	▲5.2 pp	▲5.8 pp
- Constituency results map for the Cortes of Castilla–La Mancha
President before election
Emiliano García-Page
PSOE
Elected President
Emiliano García-Page
PSOE

A regional election was held in Castilla–La Mancha on 28 May 2023 to elect the 11th Cortes of the autonomous community. All 33 seats in the Cortes were up for election. It was held concurrently with regional elections in eleven other autonomous communities and local elections all across Spain.

== Overview ==
=== Electoral system ===
The Cortes of Castilla–La Mancha were the devolved, unicameral legislature of the autonomous community of Castilla–La Mancha, having legislative power in regional matters as defined by the Spanish Constitution and the Castilian-Manchegan Statute of Autonomy, as well as the ability to vote confidence in or withdraw it from a regional president. Voting for the Cortes was on the basis of universal suffrage, which comprised all nationals over 18 years of age, registered in Castilla–La Mancha and in full enjoyment of their political rights. Amendments to the electoral law in 2022 abolished the "begged" or expat vote system (Spanish: Voto rogado), under which Spaniards abroad were required to apply for voting before being permitted to vote. The expat vote system was attributed responsibility for a major decrease in the turnout of Spaniards abroad during the years it had been in force.

The 33 members of the Cortes of Castilla–La Mancha were elected using the D'Hondt method and a closed list proportional representation, with an electoral threshold of three percent of valid votes—which included blank ballots—being applied in each constituency. Seats were allocated to constituencies, corresponding to the provinces of Albacete, Ciudad Real, Cuenca, Guadalajara and Toledo, with each being allocated an initial minimum of three seats and the remaining 18 being distributed in proportion to their populations.

As a result of the aforementioned allocation, each Cortes constituency was entitled the following seats:

Seats	Constituencies
9	Toledo
7	Albacete, Ciudad Real
5	Cuenca, Guadalajara

In smaller constituencies, the use of the electoral method resulted in an effective threshold based on the district magnitude and the distribution of votes among candidacies.

=== Election date ===
The term of the Cortes of Castilla–La Mancha expired four years after the date of their previous election. Elections to the Cortes were fixed for the fourth Sunday of May every four years. The previous election was held on 26 May 2019, setting the election date for the Cortes on 28 May 2023.

The president had the prerogative to dissolve the Cortes of Castilla–La Mancha and call a snap election, provided that no motion of no confidence was in process, no nationwide election was due and some time requirements were met: namely, that dissolution did not occur either during the first legislative session or within the legislature's last year ahead of its scheduled expiry, nor before one year had elapsed since a previous dissolution. Any snap election held as a result of these circumstances would not alter the period to the next ordinary election, with elected lawmakers serving the remainder of its original four-year term. In the event of an investiture process failing to elect a regional president within a two-month period from the first ballot, the candidate from the party with the highest number of seats was to be deemed automatically elected.

The election to the Cortes of Castilla–La Mancha were officially triggered on 4 April 2023 after the publication of the election decree in the Official Journal of Castilla–La Mancha (DOCM), scheduling for the chamber to convene on 22 June.

== Parliamentary composition ==
The table below shows the composition of the parliamentary groups in the Cortes at the time of dissolution.

Parliamentary composition in April 2023
Groups	Parties	Legislators	
Groups	Parties	Seats	Total
Socialist Parliamentary Group	PSOE	19	19
People's Parliamentary Group	PP	10	10
Citizens's Parliamentary Group	CS	4	4

== Parties and candidates ==
The electoral law allowed for parties and federations registered in the interior ministry, coalitions and groupings of electors to present lists of candidates. Parties and federations intending to form a coalition ahead of an election were required to inform the relevant Electoral Commission within ten days of the election call, whereas groupings of electors needed to secure the signature of at least one percent of the electorate in the constituencies for which they sought election, disallowing electors from signing for more than one list of candidates.

Below is a list of the main parties and electoral alliances which contested the election:

Candidacy	Parties and alliances	Leading candidate	Ideology	Previous result		Gov.	Ref.
Candidacy	Parties and alliances	Leading candidate	Ideology	Vote %	Seats	Gov.	Ref.
PSOE	List: Spanish Socialist Workers' Party (PSOE)	Emiliano García-Page	Social democracy	44.1%	19	Yes	
PP	List: People's Party (PP)	Francisco Núñez	Conservatism; Christian democracy	28.5%	10	No	
CS	List: Citizens–Party of the Citizenry (CS)	Carmen Picazo	Liberalism	11.4%	4	No	
Vox	List: Vox (Vox)	David Moreno	Right-wing populism Ultranationalism; National conservatism	7.0%	0	No	
Unidas; Podemos; CLM	List: We Can (Podemos); United Left of Castilla–La Mancha (IUCLM) – Communist Party of Castilla–La Mancha (PCE–CLM) – The Dawn Marxist Organization (La Aurora (OM)) – Republican Left (IR); Greens Equo (Verdes Equo); Green Alliance (AV)	José Luis García Gascón	Left-wing populism Direct democracy Democratic socialism	6.9%	0	No	

== Campaign ==
=== Debates ===
2023 Castilian-Manchegan regional election debates
Date	Organizer(s)	Moderator(s)	P Present (Note: Denotes a main invitee attending the event.)						
Date	Organizer(s)	Moderator(s)	PSOE	PP	CS	Vox	UP	Audience	Ref.
22 May	CMM	Óscar García; Sonia Trigueros	P Page	P Núñez	P Picazo	P Moreno	P Gascón	10.4% (67,000)	

== Opinion polls ==
The tables below list opinion polling results in reverse chronological order, showing the most recent first and using the dates when the survey fieldwork was done, as opposed to the date of publication. Where the fieldwork dates are unknown, the date of publication is given instead. The highest percentage figure in each polling survey is displayed with its background shaded in the leading party's colour. If a tie ensues, this is applied to the figures with the highest percentages. The "Lead" column on the right shows the percentage-point difference between the parties with the highest percentages in a poll.

=== Graphical summary ===
Local regression trend line of poll results from 26 May 2019 to 28 May 2023, with each line corresponding to a political party.

=== Voting intention estimates ===
The table below lists weighted voting intention estimates. Refusals are generally excluded from the party vote percentages, while question wording and the treatment of "don't know" responses and those not intending to vote may vary between polling organisations. When available, seat projections determined by the polling organisations are displayed below (or in place of) the percentages in a smaller font; 17 seats were required for an absolute majority in the Cortes of Castilla–La Mancha.

Color key:

Poll conducted after legal ban on opinion polls

Polling firm/Commissioner	Fieldwork date	Sample size	Turnout	PSOE	PP	CS	Vox	Unidas Podemos	EV	Lead
2023 regional election	28 May 2023	—N/a	69.6	45.0; 17	33.7; 12	1.0; 0	12.8; 4	4.2; 0	0.3; 0	11.3
GAD3/RTVE–FORTA	12–27 May 2023	4,000	?	44.2; 16/18	34.0; 12/13	1.5; 0	11.4; 3/4	6.8; 0	–	10.2
PSOE	22 May 2023	?	?	47.0– 48.0; 18/19	29.0– 30.0; 10/12	–	10.0– 11.0; 1/2	–	–	18.0
NC Report/La Razón	22 May 2023	?	?	40.4; 16	37.3; 14/15	–	10.9; 2/3	–	–	3.1
KeyData/Público	18 May 2023	?	71.2	41.0; 17	35.7; 14	2.4; 0	11.1; 2	6.1; 0	–	5.3
Sigma Dos/El Mundo	15–18 May 2023	1,200	?	42.3; 15/17	34.8; 13/14	1.2; 0	13.5; 3/4	6.6; 0	–	7.5
EM-Analytics/El Plural	11–17 May 2023	600	?	40.2; 16	37.2; 15	2.6; 0	10.7; 2	6.5; 0	1.6; 0	3.0
Data10/Okdiario	15–16 May 2023	1,500	?	40.5; 16	38.6; 15	1.9; 0	10.7; 2	5.7; 0	–	1.9
Target Point/El Debate	9–15 May 2023	800	?	42.2; 16/18	36.4; 13/15	1.2; 0	10.8; 2/3	6.3; 0	–	5.8
SocioMétrica/El Español	8–14 May 2023	?	?	40.4; 15/17	37.0; 14/16	2.4; 0	11.4; 2/3	5.9; 0	–	3.4
EM-Analytics/El Plural	4–10 May 2023	600	?	40.1; 16	37.3; 15	2.6; 0	10.7; 2	6.5; 0	1.7; 0	2.8
IMOP/El Confidencial	4–6 May 2023	1,295	66	46.5; 18/19	31.6; 12/13	2.3; 0	12.1; 2	4.8; 0	–	14.9
EM-Analytics/El Plural	26 Apr–3 May 2023	600	?	39.7; 16	37.0; 15	2.6; 0	10.8; 2	6.5; 0	1.7; 0	2.7
CIS	10–26 Apr 2023	971	?	47.2; 16/22	28.1; 9/11	2.7; 0	11.4; 2/4	6.9; 0/2	–	19.1
EM-Analytics/El Plural	19–25 Apr 2023	600	?	39.4; 16	? 15	? 0	11.0; 2	6.5; 0	? 0	?
EM-Analytics/El Plural	12–18 Apr 2023	600	?	38.9; 15	36.5; 15	2.5; 0	11.6; 3	6.4; 0	2.2; 0	2.4
Sigma Dos/El Mundo	17 Apr 2023	?	?	40.6; 15/16	36.6; 13/15	2.8; 0	10.8; 3/4	6.9; 0	–	4.0
Data10/Okdiario	10–13 Apr 2023	1,500	?	38.6; 15	38.8; 16	2.5; 0	10.2; 2	6.4; 0	–	0.2
EM-Analytics/El Plural	5–11 Apr 2023	600	?	38.1; 14	36.4; 15	2.2; 0	12.7; 4	6.5; 0	2.0; 0	1.7
SocioMétrica/El Español	3–7 Apr 2023	1,200	?	38.8; 15	37.2; 14	2.8; 0	11.8; 4	6.4; 0	–	1.6
Idus3/PSOE	3–5 Apr 2023	500	?	45.1; 18/20	31.0; 11/13	2.7; 0	9.8; 1/3	5.4; 0	–	14.1
EM-Analytics/El Plural	27 Mar–4 Apr 2023	600	?	37.5; 14	36.4; 15	2.3; 0	13.3; 4	6.7; 0	2.0; 0	1.1
NC Report/La Razón	17–24 Mar 2023	?	?	39.3; 15	37.6; 14	–	11.0; 4	–	–	1.7
KeyData/Público	15 Mar 2023	?	71.3	39.5; 16	36.7; 15	2.9; 0	10.5; 2	6.5; 0	–	2.8
Data10/Okdiario	14–16 Feb 2023	1,500	?	40.8; 16	38.3; 16	2.7; 0	9.1; 1	6.5; 0	–	2.5
Idus3/PSOE	9–27 Jan 2023	4,723	?	44.2; 17/19	32.5; 11/13	2.6; 0	10.6; 1/3	5.6; 0	–	11.7
PP	21 Jan 2023	?	?	? 16	? 14	–	? 3	–	–	?
GAD3/PP	16 Jan 2023	?	?	? 18	? 14	–	? 1	–	–	?
CIS (Note: Vote+Simpathy figures with undecided and/or abstentionists excluded.)	17 Nov–2 Dec 2022	449	?	44.4; 15/22	22.5; 6/13	2.0; 0	13.4; 1/6	9.6; 0/4	–	21.9
Idus3/PSOE	3–25 Nov 2022	4,350	?	46.0; 18/19	30.8; 12/13	3.7; 0	11.9; 1/3	5.9; 0	–	15.2
Sigma Dos/El Mundo	18–24 Nov 2022	1,100	?	39.9; 16/17	34.2; 14/15	3.5; 0	10.4; 3/4	6.4; 0	–	5.7
PP	5 Oct 2022	?	66.9	39.2; 15/16	38.9; 15/16	1.5; 0	10.8; 2	4.7; 0	–	0.3
Idus3/PSOE	16–20 May 2022	800	?	44.9; 18/19	31.9; 11/12	3.2; 0	9.5; 3/4	5.0; 0	–	13.0
NC Report/PP	2–18 May 2022	2,400	66.3	39.5; 16	37.0; 14	3.2; 0	11.1; 3	6.2; 0	–	2.5
EM-Analytics/Electomanía	28 Feb–13 Apr 2022	324	?	38.6; 15	35.3; 14	2.9; 0	13.1; 4	6.8; 0	1.7; 0	3.3
EM-Analytics/Electomanía	1 Dec–14 Jan 2022	191	?	39.7; 15	35.7; 14	2.8; 0	12.5; 4	6.6; 0	1.2; 0	4.0
Idus3/PSOE	3–17 Dec 2021	4,723	?	45.5; 18/19	30.9; 11/13	3.6; 0	12.5; 2/4	5.5; 0	–	14.6
GAD3/PSOE	20 Nov–3 Dec 2021	1,202	?	42.9; 17/19	30.7; 11/12	4.3; 0	13.0; 3/4	6.9; 0	–	12.2
Idus3/PSOE	4–15 Oct 2021	2,500	?	42.5; 18/20	30.2; 12/13	5.1; 0	13.2; 1/2	5.9; 0	–	12.3
NC Report/La Tribuna	14 Oct 2021	1,450	64.6	38.9; 15	38.1; 15	3.4; 0	11.9; 3	5.3; 0	–	0.8
EM-Analytics/Electomanía	13 Jul–21 Aug 2021	223	?	39.8; 16	36.7; 15	–	11.0; 2	6.2; 0	–	3.1
Idus3/PSOE	24–28 May 2021	1,200	?	? 17/18	? 12/13	? 0	? 2/4	? 0	–	?
NC Report/La Razón	19–25 May 2021	1,450	?	38.6; 15	38.3; 15	3.4; 0	12.0; 3	5.1; 0	–	0.3
PSOE	19 Dec 2020	?	?	42.0; 18	33.0; 12/13	7.1; 0/1	10.0; 3/4	5.0; 0	–	9.0
ElectoPanel/Electomanía	15 Jul 2020	850	?	38.6; 16	33.5; 14	7.7; 0	10.2; 2	8.1; 1	–	5.1
PSOE	29 Jun–10 Jul 2020	2,500	?	42.3; 18	31.5; 11/12	7.6; 1/2	? 1/2	6.4; 0	–	10.8
SyM Consulting	20–22 May 2020	3,209	68.3	37.5; 13/16	29.6; 9/13	5.9; 0	16.5; 6	8.4; 1/3	–	7.9
NC Report/La Razón	17–21 May 2020	1,858	?	40.3; 16	33.7; 14	6.5; 0	11.2; 3	6.4; 0	–	6.6
ElectoPanel/Electomanía	1 Apr–15 May 2020	?	?	40.4; 18	36.2; 14	5.8; 0	7.9; 1	8.0; 0	–	4.2
Numeral 8/La Tribuna	20–24 Jan 2020	1,050	?	43.4; 18	29.9; 11	9.1; 3	8.6; 1	7.6; 0	–	13.5
PSOE	3 Dec 2019	?	?	? 18/20	? 8/9	? 2/3	? 3/4	? 0	–	?
November 2019 general election	10 Nov 2019	—N/a	70.6	33.1 (13)	26.9 (10)	6.8 (0)	21.9 (9)	9.2 (1)	–	6.2
2019 regional election	26 May 2019	—N/a	69.4	44.1; 19	28.5; 10	11.4; 4	7.0; 0	6.9; 0	–	15.6

=== Voting preferences ===
The table below lists raw, unweighted voting preferences.

Polling firm/Commissioner	Fieldwork date	Sample size	PSOE	PP	CS	Vox	Unidas Podemos	Question	X mark	Lead
2023 regional election	28 May 2023	—N/a	31.5	23.5	0.7	9.0	2.9	—N/a	28.9	8.0
CIS	10–26 Apr 2023	971	38.4	18.2	1.2	8.9	4.8	21.7	2.9	20.2
Idus3/PSOE	3–5 Apr 2023	500	30.5	16.1	0.7	7.0	3.0	32.2	6.9	14.4
Idus3/PSOE	9–27 Jan 2023	4,723	30.0	17.0	0.6	7.4	2.7	32.2	6.9	13.0
CIS	17 Nov–2 Dec 2022	449	29.9	13.9	0.7	9.1	6.3	28.9	5.4	16.0
Idus3/PSOE	3–25 Nov 2022	4,350	28.8	15.4	0.8	6.4	2.8	35.2	7.5	13.4
Idus3/PSOE	16–20 May 2022	800	32.0	17.9	0.9	7.9	2.8	28.2	7.3	14.1
Idus3/PSOE	3–17 Dec 2021	4,723	31.5	18.3	1.1	9.4	3.5	24.1	9.1	13.2
November 2019 general election	10 Nov 2019	—N/a	23.3	18.9	4.8	15.4	6.5	—N/a	28.6	4.4
2019 regional election	26 May 2019	—N/a	30.9	20.0	8.0	4.9	4.8	—N/a	29.2	10.9

=== Victory likelihood ===
The table below lists opinion polling on the perceived likelihood of victory for each party in the event of a regional election taking place.

Polling firm/Commissioner	Fieldwork date	Sample size	PSOE	PP	CS	Vox	Unidas Podemos	Other/ None	Question	Lead
GAD3/PSOE	20 Nov–3 Dec 2021	1,202	56.5	17.9	0.5	3.7	0.7	28.1		38.6

=== Preferred President ===
The table below lists opinion polling on leader preferences to become president of the Junta of Communities of Castilla–La Mancha.

Polling firm/Commissioner	Fieldwork date	Sample size						Other/ None/ Not care	Question	Lead
Polling firm/Commissioner	Fieldwork date	Sample size	Page PSOE	Núñez PP	Picazo CS	Cañizares Vox	Gascón UP	Other/ None/ Not care	Question	Lead
IMOP/El Confidencial	4–6 May 2023	1,295	42.0	13.0	–	–	–	–	–	29.0
Idus3/PSOE	9–27 Jan 2023	4,723	46.2	13.9	–	–	–	26.8	13.1	32.3
Idus3/PSOE	16–20 May 2022	800	47.5	12.4	–	–	–	22.9	17.2	35.1
Idus3/PSOE	3–17 Dec 2021	4,723	58.0	18.0	–	–	–	24.0		40.0
GAD3/PSOE	20 Nov–3 Dec 2021	1,202	38.0	11.2	1.8	5.4	2.4	41.2		26.8

== Results ==
=== Overall ===
← Summary of the 28 May 2023 Cortes of Castilla–La Mancha election results →
Parties and alliances	Popular vote			Seats	
Parties and alliances	Votes	%	±pp	Total	+/−
Spanish Socialist Workers' Party (PSOE)	490,288	45.04	+0.94	17	−2
People's Party (PP)	366,312	33.65	+5.12	12	+2
Vox (Vox)	139,607	12.83	+5.81	4	+4
United We Can Castilla–La Mancha (Unidas Podemos CLM)	45,317	4.16	−2.76	0	±0
Citizens–Party of the Citizenry (CS)	10,885	1.00	−10.38	0	−4
Animalist Party with the Environment (PACMA)^{1}	10,727	0.99	+0.19	0	±0
Empty Spain (España Vaciada)	3,654	0.33	New	0	±0
+CUENCA Now–Empty Spain (+CU–EV)	1,984	0.18	New	0	±0
Empty Spain (España Vaciada)	1,670	0.15	New	0	±0
Country with Managers (País con Gestores)	2,151	0.20	New	0	±0
Castilian Party–Commoners' Land–Zero Cuts (PCAS–TC–RC)	1,345	0.12	−0.01	0	±0
Communist Party of the Peoples of Spain (PCPE)	989	0.09	−0.03	0	±0
Here Now (Aquí Ahora)	724	0.07	New	0	±0
Your Fatherland (TÚpatria)	585	0.05	New	0	±0
Spanish Phalanx of the CNSO (FE–JONS)	299	0.03	New	0	±0
Blank ballots	15,570	1.43	+0.62		
Total	1,088,453			33	±0
Valid votes	1,088,453	98.28	−0.67		
Invalid votes	19,054	1.72	+0.67		
Votes cast / turnout	1,107,507	69.60	+0.15		
Abstentions	483,755	30.40	−0.15		
Registered voters	1,591,262				
Sources
Footnotes: ^{1} Animalist Party with the Environment results are compared to Animalist Party Against Mistreatment of Animals totals in the 2019 election.

Popular vote
PSOE	45.04%
PP	33.65%
Vox	12.83%
U. Pod. CLM	4.16%
Others	2.88%
Blank ballots	1.43%

Seats
PSOE	51.52%
PP	36.36%
Vox	12.12%

=== Distribution by constituency ===
Constituency	PSOE		PP		Vox	
Constituency	%	S	%	S	%	S
Albacete	42.6	3	35.5	3	12.4	1
Ciudad Real	46.6	4	34.5	2	12.0	1
Cuenca	47.4	3	33.6	2	10.5	−
Guadalajara	42.2	2	30.3	2	16.1	1
Toledo	45.6	5	33.2	3	13.3	1
Total	45.0	17	33.7	12	12.8	4

== Aftermath ==
Investiture; Emiliano García-Page (PSOE)
Ballot →	6 July 2023
Required majority →	17 out of 33
Yes: • PSOE (17)	17 / 33
No: • PP (12); • Vox (4)	16 / 33
Abstentions	0 / 33
Absentees	0 / 33
