= Francisco Núñez =

Francisco Núñez may refer to:

- Francisco Núñez (conductor), American conductor and composer
- Francisco Núñez (boxer), Argentine boxer
- Francisco Núñez (politician), Spanish politician
- Francisco Núñez Melián, Spanish adventurer and royal administrator
