= David Moreno (actor) =

Spanish singer and actor

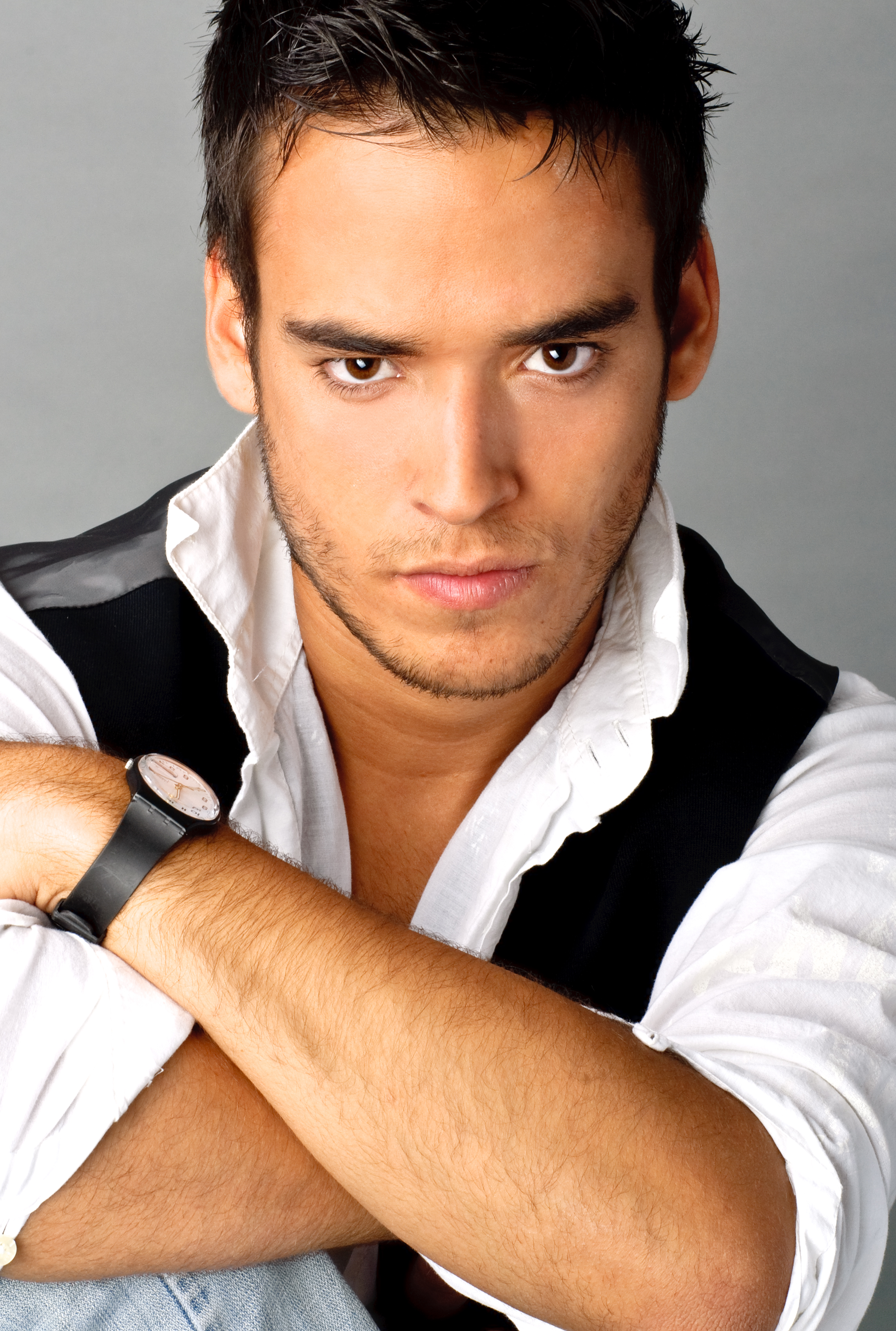
- Born: July 14, 1985 (age 40); Logroño, La Rioja, Spain
- Occupations: presenter, singer, actor, journalist
- Website: http://www.davidmoreno.net

David Moreno (born July 14, 1985 in Logroño, La Rioja) is a Spanish singer, actor, presenter, and journalist.

== Education ==
From 1993 to 2009, Moreno took singing and dancing classes with many different Spanish teachers. He took a high school musical workshop with Stage Entertainment Spain (Madrid) in 2008. From 2006 to 2007, he attended Espada de Madera Theatre School in Madrid, and from 2007 to 2009 attended Corazza Actors Studio in Madrid. In 2009, he received a degree in journalism from The Complutense University of Madrid, and a degree in acting and musical theatre from Arts Educational Schools, London.

After signing with the record label 'Blanco y Negro' he reached the top 9 at the Spanish charts with his single 'Turn Up The Radio'. Recently he launched 'Sueña Conmigo' and 'Titanio' a great version of David Guetta's hit.

Recently, he's been working at TV shows as Todo Es Mentira and Sálvame, and he also hosted the gameshow La Casa de los Retos, aired on Boing.

== Television ==
- La Casa de los Retos. Boing. Host. 2020–present
- Coke Studio. [Coca-Cola Music Experience] Coke. Host. 2020–present
- La habitación del Pánico Cuatro y Divinity Colaborador
- Todo Es Mentira. Cuatro. Reporter. 2019
- MorninGlory. Mediaset. Host and director. 2018
- Dulceweekend. [mtmad] Host., 2017, 2018.
- La Tele Que Los Parió. [Fórmula TV]. 2012
- Metro a Metro. Telemadrid. 2012
- In The Qube (Spanish version). Animax. Host. 2010
- Planeta Pokémon. Jetix. Host. 2005-2009.
- My School Musical 2: Locos por el baile. Disney Channel. Host. 2008
- RIS Científica. TeleCinco & Videomedia. Actor. 2007
- Corta-T. Cuatro & Videomedia. Actor. 2007
- Un Paso Adelante. Antena 3 & Globomedia. Extra. 2003

== Theatre ==
- Thriller Jackson. Michael Jackson Tribute. Spanish Tour 2014-2015.
- ABBA 40 - Abba Tribute. Spanish Tour 2013-2014.
- High School Musical on Stage! as Ryan Evans. Spanish Tour 2008-2009. Stage Entertainment Spain
- Grease Tour. Spain. Elite Productions.
- Pulgarcito. Teatro Arlequín (Madrid) and On Tour (Valencia). Olimpy Productions
- El príncipe feliz. Teatro Arlequín (Madrid) and On Tour (Valencia). Olimpy Production

== Voice-Over & Recordings ==
- Kiss Me feat. Julián The Angel. (June 2014)
- Block Party - reached the Top2 at the Pop iTunes Charts in Spain. (June 2013)
- Turn Up The Radio - His first solo single, reached the Top9 at iTunes Spain. (June 2012)
- Irreality Show! it's a radio show that he hosts. HappyFM.es (2011-2012 )
- High School Musical OST (Spain) as Ryan, EMI Music Spain & Disney Records
- Pokémon: Advanced Battle (Opening Song for the Spanish TV Series)
- Pokémon: Battle Frontier (Opening Song for the Spanish TV Series)
- Spanish Video Lessons: being a cartoon voice over, UR Universidad de La Rioja (Spain)

== Others ==
- June 2012 released his first solo single "Turn Up The Radio" reaching the númber 9 on the Spanish iTunes charts, and number 3 on Spanish dance charts.
- Nominated as Best New Actor for HSM at Gran Vía Musical Theatre Awards (Spain)

== References (in Spanish) ==
- Planetadelibros.com "David Moreno publica su primer libro, 'Pichichán'" - actualizado enero de 2024
- mediaset.es "El presentador de 'La casa de los retos', David Moreno, abre la nueva temporada de 'Conciertos en Familia' de la Orquesta Sinfónica'" - actualizado enero de 2024
- mediaset.es "Boing estrena 'La Casa de los Retos'" - actualizado octubre de 2020
- cineytele.com "Animax estrena su primer programa de producción propia" - actualizado marzo de 2010
- Mundoplus.tv "Animax presenta su nuevo espacio semanal: "In The Qube" - actualizado marzo de 2010
- La Rioja "El actor riojano David Moreno estrena la obra 'High School Musical'" - actualizado febrero 2008
- El Mundo "Arranca 'High School Musical'" - actualizado septiembre 2008
- Todo musicales Entrevista "David Moreno y Ana San Martín, los gemelos de HIGH SCHOOL MUSICAL, valoran su paso por el musical" - actualizado enero 2009
- La Opinión Coruña "David Moreno: ´Nuestro espectáculo tiene la magia de Disney y Broadway´"
- Red Teatral "David Moreno como parte del Cast de High School Musical
