= Carmen Picazo =

Spanish lawyer and politician

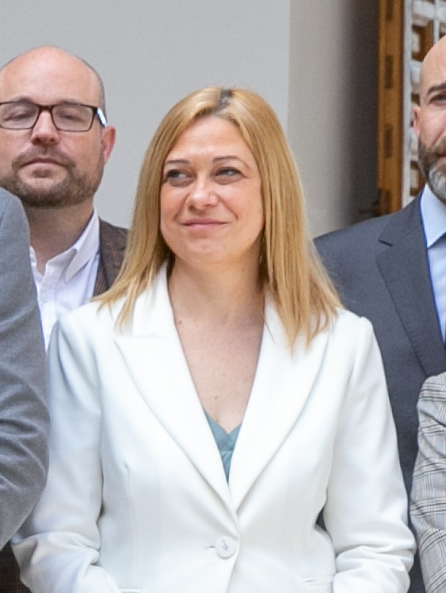

Member of the Cortes of Castilla–La Mancha
- In office 19 June 2019 – 22 June 2023
- Constituency: Albacete

Member of the Albacete City Council
- In office 2015–2019

Personal details
- Born: 1975 (age 50–51) Albacete, Spain
- Party: Citizens
- Education: University of Castilla–La Mancha
- Occupation: Lawyer

María del Carmen Picazo Pérez (born 1975) is a Spanish lawyer and politician for the Citizens party. She was elected to the Cortes of Castilla–La Mancha as her party's leader in 2019 and lost her seat in 2023.

== Biography ==
Born in Albacete, Picazo graduated in Law from the University of Castilla–La Mancha, and is a lawyer for criminal and civil cases. She joined Citizens in 2013, and was elected to Albacete City Council as the party's list leader in the 2015 elections.

In March 2019, she received 94% of the votes to lead the party's campaign in the Castilian-Manchegan regional election in May. With 11% of the votes and four seats, the party entered the legislature as its third party. In July of the same year, she was added to Citizens' national executive body.

Citizens lost all its representatives in the Cortes of Castilla–La Mancha in the 2023 election, while Picazo stayed on as leader of the party in the region, and maintained her seat on Albacete City Council despite losing 11,000 votes.
