= Leswis Landaeta =

Venezuelan footballer (born 2000)

Personal information
- Full name: Leswis José Landaeta Ferreira
- Date of birth: 24 May 2000 (age 26)
- Place of birth: Venezuela
- Position: Midfielder

Youth career
- –2017: Aragua

Senior career*
Years	Team	Apps	(Gls)
2017–2021	Aragua	29	(0)
- * Club domestic league appearances and goals as of 2022

Leswis José Landaeta Ferreira (born 24 May 2000) is a Venezuelan footballer who played as a midfielder for Venezuelan Primera División side Aragua F.C.

== Club career ==
Landaeta made his professional debut for Aragua in the 2017 season, and despite his young age, was credited for his control and vision.

== Career statistics ==
=== Club ===
As of 20 October 2019.

Club	Season	League			Cup		Continental		Other		Total	
Club	Season	Division	Apps	Goals	Apps	Goals	Apps	Goals	Apps	Goals	Apps	Goals
Aragua	2017	Primera División	22	0	2 (Note: Appearances in the Copa Venezuela)	0	–		0	0	5	1
Aragua	2018	Primera División	2	0	0	0	–		0	0	5	0
Aragua	2019	Primera División	1	0	0	0	–		0	0	5	0
Career total			25	0	2	0	0	0	0	0	27	0
