= Nika Šapek =

Slovenian footballer

Personal information
- Date of birth: 26 April 2000 (age 26)
- Position: Goalkeeper

Team information
- Current team: Olimpija Ljubljana

Youth career
- 2012–2017: Fužinar

Senior career*
Years	Team	Apps	(Gls)
2016–2017	Fužinar	15	(0)
2017–2019	Radomlje	17	(0)
2020–	Olimpija Ljubljana	16	(0)

International career^{‡}
2015–2017	Slovenia U17	8	(1)
2017–2018	Slovenia U19	4	(0)
2018–	Slovenia	5	(0)
- * Club domestic league appearances and goals as of 22 May 2021. ‡ National team caps and goals as of 13 April 2021.

Nika Šapek (born 26 April 2000) is a Slovenian footballer who plays as a goalkeeper for Women's League club ŽNK Olimpija Ljubljana and the Slovenia women's national team.

== Club career ==
Šapek has played for KNK Fužinar, ŽNK Radomlje and Olimpija Ljubljana in Slovenia.

== International career ==
Šapek made her senior debut for Slovenia on 6 March 2018 in a 2–2 friendly home draw against Serbia.
