= Enzo Valentim =

French footballer (born 2000)

Personal information
- Date of birth: 11 September 2000 (age 26)
- Place of birth: Tours, France
- Height: 1.88 m (6 ft 2 in)
- Position: Right-back

Team information
- Current team: UF Touraine

Youth career
- 2006–2011: Saint-Pierre-des-Corps
- 2011–2018: Tours

Senior career*
Years	Team	Apps	(Gls)
2016–2018	Tours B	21	(1)
2018	Tours	2	(0)
2018–2022	Reims B	52	(0)
2022–2024	Créteil	46	(3)
2024–2025	Paris 13 Atletico	25	(0)
2025–2026	Villefranche	13	(0)
2026	La Roche	17	(0)
2026–	UF Touraine	0	(0)
- * Club domestic league appearances and goals as of 16 May 2026

Enzo Valentim (born 11 September 2000) is a French professional footballer who plays as a right-back for Championnat National 2 club UF Touraine.

He has also received a call up to the France under-18s in 2018.

== Club career ==
=== Tours FC ===
A member of Tours's youth academy since 2011, Valentim made his professional debut for Tours in a 3–2 Ligue 2 loss to Gazélec Ajaccio on 20 April 2018.

=== Reims ===
On 3 July 2018, Valentim joined Ligue 1 club Reims, where he would initially play for the reserve side, making fourteen appearances for the B team in the Championnat National 2 during the 2018–19 season.

In July 2019, Valentim was used in Reims's first team during the 2019–20 pre-season.

== International career ==
Valentim is able to represent France or Portugal at international level.

Valentim was called up to represent the France national under-18 football team for a pair of friendlies in February 2018.
