= Petro Dolhov =

Ukrainian footballer

Personal information
- Full name: Petro Dmytrovych Dolhov
- Date of birth: 29 June 2000 (age 26)
- Place of birth: Bolhrad, Ukraine
- Height: 1.78 m (5 ft 10 in)
- Positions: Full-back; centre-back

Team information
- Current team: Atlantis FC
- Number: 4

Youth career
- 2013: Chornomorets Odesa
- 2013–2014: DYuSSh Bolhrad
- 2014–2019: Chornomorets Odesa

Senior career*
Years	Team	Apps	(Gls)
2019	Chornomorets-2 Odesa	14	(0)
2019–2023	Chornomorets Odesa	27	(0)
2023	Karpaty Lviv	0	(0)
2024–2026	MSV Neuruppin	45	(4)
2026–	Atlantis FC	4	(0)
- * Club domestic league appearances and goals as of 7 November 2026

Petro Dmytrovych Dolhov (Ukrainian: Петро Дмитрович Долгов; born 29 June 2000) is a Ukrainian professional footballer who plays for Finnish fourth-tier Kakkonen club Atlantis FC. Mainly a right-back, he can also play left-back or centre-back.
