= David Moreno (footballer) =

Venezuelan footballer (born 2000)

Personal information
- Full name: David José Moreno Ramos
- Date of birth: 13 April 2000 (age 26)
- Place of birth: Puerto Ordaz, Venezuela
- Position: Midfielder

Team information
- Current team: Mineros de Guayana
- Number: 21

Youth career
- Mineros de Guayana

Senior career*
Years	Team	Apps	(Gls)
2016–2017	Mineros de Guayana	0	(0)
2017–2018	Chicó de Guayana		
2019	Boyacá Chicó	2	(0)
2020	LALA	5	(0)
2021–2024	Angostura FC		
2025–	Mineros de Guayana	18	(0)
- * Club domestic league appearances and goals as of 20:06, 26 October 2025 (UTC)

David José Moreno Ramos (born 13 April 2000) is a Venezuelan footballer who plays as a midfielder for Mineros de Guayana.

== Career ==
=== Club career ===
Moreno was born in Puerto Ordaz of the Ciudad Guayana in Venezuela. He started his career with Mineros de Guayana, where he played on youth level and never got his first team debut. However, he was on the bench for two Copa Venezuela games in August 2016.

After two years with Chicó de Guayana, Moreno moved to Colombian Categoría Primera B club Boyacá Chicó. Moreno made a total of three appearances, two in the league and one in the cup. He returned to Venezuela for the 2020 season, signing with Venezuelan Primera División side LALA FC.

In April 2021, he signed with Angostura FC. He left the club at the end of 2024.

In March 2025 it was confirmed, that Morano had returned to Mineros de Guayana.
