= David Moreno (politician) =

Spanish politician

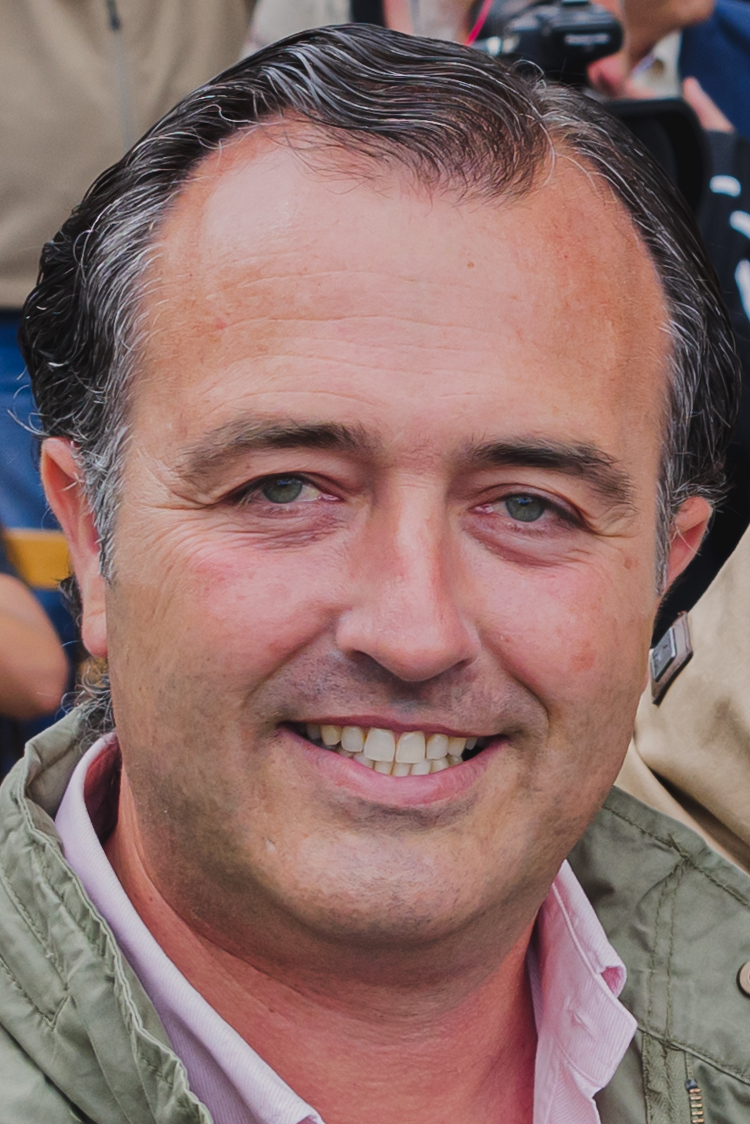

David Moreno Ramos (born 1979 or 1980) is a Spanish Vox politician. He has served on the city council in his hometown of Talavera de la Reina since 2019, being deputy mayor since 2023. He was Vox's lead candidate in the 2023 Castilian-Manchegan regional election, in which his party entered the Cortes of Castilla–La Mancha.

== Biography ==
Moreno was born in Talavera de la Reina, Province of Toledo, as the youngest of six children. He graduated in law and business management from the Alfonso X El Sabio University in Madrid. After six years of study in the capital city, he returned home to work as a businessman.

Moreno joined Vox in 2018 and became vice president of their organisation in his native province in 2020. In April 2019, he was chosen as Vox's candidate for mayor of Talavera in July's local elections. His party entered the council with three seats. In 2023, Vox took four seats and the People's Party (PP) took nine, allowing them to form a coalition and remove the Spanish Socialist Workers' Party (PSOE) from power; José Julián Gregorio of the PP became mayor and Moreno the deputy mayor.

Moreno was chosen in December 2022 as Vox's lead candidate in the 2023 Castilian-Manchegan regional election. He ran on a platform with a focus on strengthening the rural economy and using financial incentives to combat depopulation in the remote region. Vox entered the Cortes of Castilla–La Mancha with four seats, but combined with the PP's 12, fell one seat short of removing the PSOE from power.

== Personal life ==
As of 2022, Moreno is married and has three children. He is a fan of bullfighting and horseriding, and has served as a judge in equestrianism.
