= Francisco Núñez (politician) =

Spanish politician

Francisco Javier Núñez
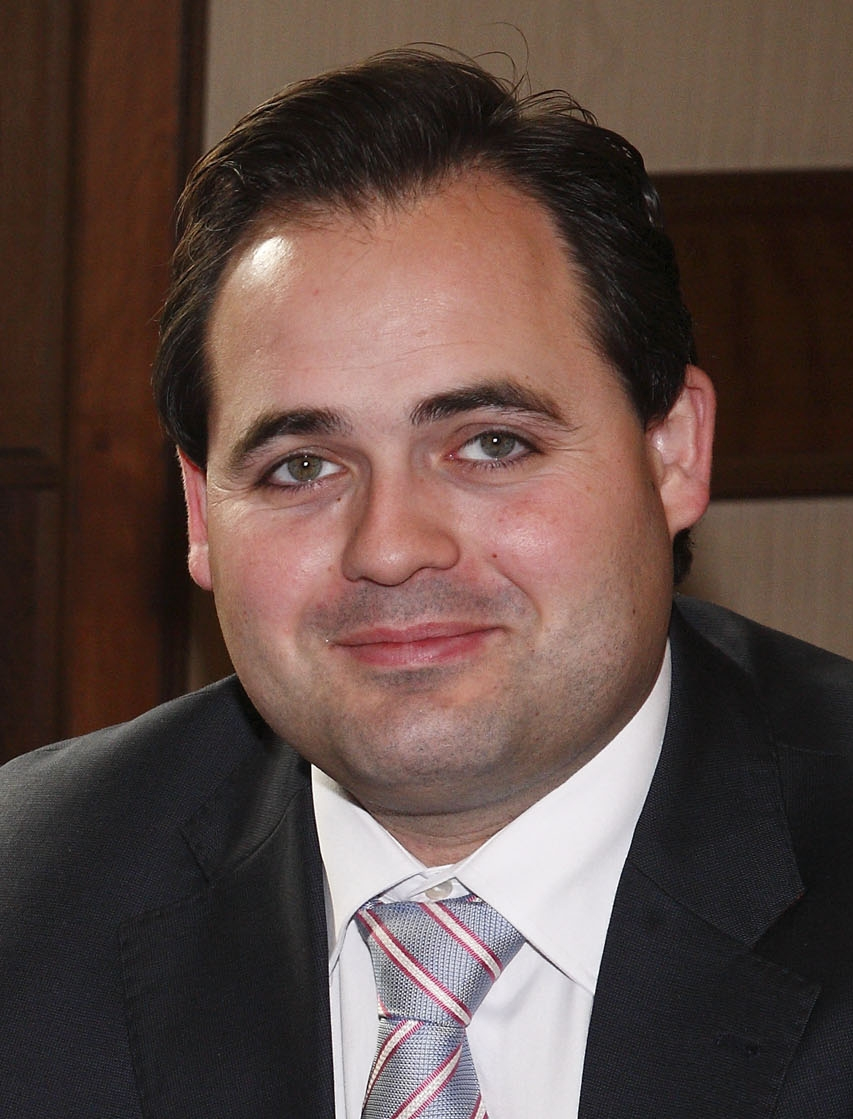

President of the People's Party of Castilla–La Mancha
- Incumbent
- Assumed office 7 October 2018
- Deputy: Carolina Agudo
- Preceded by: María Dolores de Cospedal

Member of the Cortes of Castilla–La Mancha
- Incumbent
- Assumed office 18 June 2015
- Constituency: Albacete

President of the Provincial Council of Albacete
- In office 6 July 2011 – 3 July 2015
- Preceded by: Pedro Antonio Ruiz Santos
- Succeeded by: Santiago Cabañero

Mayor of Almansa
- Incumbent
- Assumed office 11 June 2011
- Preceded by: Antonio López Cantos

Personal details
- Born: Francisco Javier Núñez Núñez; 13 March 1982 (age 44) Almansa, Spain
- Party: People's Party
- Education: Complutense University of Madrid

Francisco Javier Núñez Núñez (born 13 March 1982) is a Spanish politician of the People's Party, mayor of Almansa and Member in the Cortes of Castilla-La Mancha. Between 2011 and 2015 he was President of the Provincial Council of Albacete.

On 27 September 2018 he won the primaries of the People's Party of Castilla–La Mancha, becoming the next President of the party in the Extraordinary Congress to be held on 7 October in Albacete.
