= Permanent Deputation =

Parliamentary body in Spain

The Permanent Deputation, in Spain, is a parliamentary body consisting of a reduced number of members of parliament which assume the legislative powers of the Parliament when it is not in session. The members of this body are chosen proportionally to the number of deputies that each political group has. The chair of a permanent deputation is normally the speaker of the Parliament.

This body cannot be compared to a Parliamentary Committee due to, although it is true that during the meeting periods it has a mere preparatory duties, when the parliament is not active it assumes the powers of the whole Parliament but not by a delegation of the parliament (as it happens with the committees) but by constitutional mandate.

At the national level, each house of the Cortes Generales (the Spanish parliament) has its own Permanent Deputation, both of them chaired by the speaker of each house.

== History ==
=== Early period ===
The origin of this permanent deputation it is not the period of constitutionalism (19th century-present) when it was deeply regulated but the Spanish medieval times. Already in the Catalan Courts, there are traces of a medieval body of a permanent nature responsible for ensuring compliance with the law approved by these Courts. This body was originally focused on administrative-economic affairs and it was created in the 12th century. This useful body was extended to other Spanish parliaments, such as the Aragonese, Navarre, Valencian or Casitilian one.

However, the Permanent Deputation, with this name and nature was created in 1812, when the first Spanish Constitution was passed. This Constitution regulates this body in sections 157 to 160; it established a seven-member deputation: three from the Spanish territories in Europe, three from the Spanish territories in the Americas and one randomly chosen from both groups. Likewise, from both groups two alternate members would be also elected.

Despite its secondary character, sometimes it assumed more powers than it was granted to it by the Constitution, defying the Monarch or supplanting the parliament itself when it did not agree with it. The raison d'être of this body was nothing more than guaranteeing freedom and continuity to the Parliament, since in previous times it only met at the will of the monarch and to guarantee respect for the Constitution and laws. The Permanent Deputation had also the power to call for an extraordinary meeting when the Crown became vacant, when the Monarch wants to abdicate or when could not exercise his powers, or when the Monarch ask for an extraordinary meeting.

After 1837 the Deputation disappeared because of the conservative politicians. They imposed their thesis that Parliament could not limit the Monarch's powers and they subordinated the Parliament to the Sovereign, being this last the one responsible for calling the meeting of parliament and the permanent deputation was suppressed to avoid extraordinary control of the royal government. In 1856, a project of Constitution devised a Permanent Deputation formed by five members of Congress and four senators, but that Constitution never came to be enacted.

In 1869, in a new constitutional debate, an amend was proposed to recover the Permanent Deputation "to guarantee the continuity of national sovereignty", however, the Constitutional Committee rejected the amend considering that the Parliament had no national sovereignty because it belonged to the people, not to parliament. During this period it did exist a Permanent Committee entrusted with the task of managing the parliament while it was with no activity.

The Deputation was recovered in 1873 with the First Spanish Republic consisting in 20 members plus the members of the Congress' Bureau. The Deputation received the name of Permanent Committee and it was confronted to the federal government since its birth causing that, in many occasions, when the Committee request the appearance of the whole government, it appeared only one of the ministers to justify the rest. The highest point of confrontation took place on April 23, 1873, when the whole government was summoned and all the ministers except the president appeared. In the middle of the meeting, the President asked its government to return due to the social unrest and the Committee declared itself in a permanent session, causing that in the midnight, the federal police dissolved by force the committee. This was de facto a coup against the parliament. The constituent parliament met for the first time in June, but the republic would turn into a dictatorship in January 1874 and it would finally fall in December 1874.

=== Late period ===
After almost 60 years of nonexistence, the body was recovered by the Second Spanish Republic under the historic name of Deputation instead of Committee. The 1931 regulation established that the Deputation would known about the suspension of constitutional rights, about decree-laws and about matters of arrest of MPs. It was formed by 21 members proportionally elected and chaired by the Speaker of the House.

The francoist parliament did not have a Permanent Deputation and the body was re-introduced in 1977 with a very similar regulation of that of 1931.

== Current deputations ==
The current Spanish Constitution establishes one Permanent Deputation for each House of the Parliament with a minimum of 21 members proportionally chosen by the Parliamentary Groups and chaired by the speakers. Both the Congress and the Senate standing rules establish that the Bureaus are responsible for establishing the number of members of the Permanent Deputation (never less than 21). Those members are designated by the Parliamentary Groups and an equal number of alternate members are also designated. Once that the Deputation is assembled, the members shall choose two Vice Presidents and two Secretaries of the Bureau of the Permanent Deputation. When the houses recovered its activity, the actions of the deputation are accountable to the chambers.

=== Senate ===
The Senate' Permanent Deputation for the 15th Cortes Generales was officially established on October 3, 2023. The Deputation is formed by 36 senators —speaker included— and chaired by the Speaker. The distribution of seats is the following:

- 19 from the Socialist Group.
- 12 from the Popular Group.
- 1 from the Left for Independence Group.
- 1 from the Plural Group.
- 1 from the Basque Group.
- 1 from the Confederal Left Group.
- 1 from the Mixed Group.

Bureau of the Senate' Permanent Deputation
| Office | Name | Party |
| Chair (Speaker) | Pedro Rollán | People's Party |
| First Deputy Chair | Javier Maroto | People's Party |
| Second Deputy Chair | Guillermo Fernández Vara | Socialist Party |
| First Secretary | Eva Ortiz Vilella | People's Party |
| Third Secretary | Mª Ángeles Luna Morales | Socialist Party |

=== Congress of Deputies ===
The Agreement of the Bureau of the Congress of Deputies of 25 October 2023 established a 69-member Permanent Deputation chaired by the Speaker. This is the current distribution of seats:

- 27 from the Socialist Group.
- 25 from the Popular Group.
- 6 from the VOX Group.
- 6 from the Sumar Group.
- 1 from the Republican Group.
- 1 from the Junts Group.
- 1 from the EH Bildu Group.
- 1 from the Basque Group.
- 1 from the Mixed Group.

Bureau of the Congress' Permanent Deputation
| Office | Name | Party |
| Chair (Speaker) | Francina Armengol | Socialist Party |
| First Deputy Chair | Alfonso Rodríguez Gómez de Celis | Socialist Party |
| Second Deputy Chair | José Antonio Bermúdez de Castro | People's Party |
| First Secretary | Esther Gil | Sumar |
| Second Secretary | Marta González Vázquez | People's Party |
