= Mixed Group (Spain) =

Spanish parliamentary group

In Spain, the Mixed Group (Spanish: Grupo Mixto) refers to a parliamentary group composed of all members of the Cortes Generales (Spanish Parliament) who do not meet the essential requirements to form their own independent parliamentary group, as stipulated by the Spanish Constitution, Spanish law, or the internal regulations of the parliament. Elected representatives who have been expelled from — or have voluntarily left — their political party are not automatically included in the Mixed Group; instead, they are classified as "non-attached deputies" (diputados no adscritos). Such individuals are relegated to a marginal role, dependent upon the discretion of the parliamentary Bureau.

Many parliamentary initiatives and discussions are processed through parliamentary groups, making a political party's ability or inability to form its own group highly significant. The Mixed Group serves as a vehicle for these minority representatives to channel their legislative initiatives. Despite certain limitations, the Mixed Group generally enjoys the same opportunities to participate in the work of the Chamber as other parliamentary groups.

== Requirements to form a parliamentary group in Spain ==
The requirements for forming a parliamentary group are set out in the Rules of the Congress of Deputies and are as follows:

- A request must be submitted in writing to the Bureau of the Chamber within 5 days of the Congress’ constitutive session.
- A political party or coalition may form a parliamentary group with as few as 5 deputies, provided it has secured 15% of the votes in the constituencies where it ran candidates, or 5% of the total vote nationwide.
- Deputies belonging to the same party or to political groups that did not compete against one another in the electionmay not form separate parliamentary groups.

Political groups that do not meet these requirements are assigned to the Mixed Group.

=== Recent regulatory changes ===
In July 2026, the Congress of Deputies approved an amendment to Article 23 of its Rules of Procedure to relax the requirements for forming a parliamentary group, ahead of the upcoming 2026 general elections. Under the new rules, championed by minority parties (ERC, Junts, Podemos, Compromís, and BNG), it is no longer strictly necessary to meet the previous thresholds (15 deputies, or 5% of the national vote/15% in a given constituency). Instead, parties now only need to secure 3% of the national vote or 10% in the provinces where they have won representation, a change intended to reduce the need to rely on "borrowed" deputies.

=== Borrowed deputies ===
On several occasions, minor political parties have managed to form a parliamentary group without strictly meeting the requirements (regarding votes or seats), thanks to the practice of "borrowing" deputies. This involves one party lending its deputies and, by extension, the votes associated with them, to another party at the time the parliamentary group is being established, allowing the group to meet the necessary thresholds. Subsequently, these "borrowed" deputies return to their original party’s parliamentary group. This does not jeopardize the minor party’s group, provided that its number of deputies does not fall below half of the initial count; if it were to drop below that threshold, the group would be dissolved under the rules of the Congress.

The benefits and advantages of having one’s own parliamentary group include more time to speak during debates, representation on all committees, a seat on the Board of Spokespersons, participation in the Permanent Deputation, and, most importantly, larger financial subsidies and coverage for the distribution of electoral campaign materials.

== Disadvantages ==
The process of borrowing deputies is used as being part of the mixed parliamentary group entails a number of disadvantages compared to managing to form one’s own parliamentary group. This includes:

- Members of the Mixed Group have to divide the time allotted for speeches among the parties that comprise it, which often share little to no ideological affinity.
- They are compelled to share the subsidies. The financial regulations of the Congress stipulate that each parliamentary group shall receive a fixed monthly sum of 30,346.72 euros, plus a “variable subsidy based on the number of deputies”, equivalent to an additional 1,746.16 euros per parliamentarian. Therefore, the Mixed Group receives the same fixed amount as a party with its own parliamentary group.
- Having your own parliamentary group grants representation on the Permanent Deputation and the Board of Spokespersons. This, in turn, provides a financial benefit, as the Congress’ financial regulations stipulate that members of the Permanent Deputation shall receive a constitutional allowance, an indemnity and a supplement equal in amount to what they were earning at the time the Cortes were dissolved, while also retaining their status as individuals subject to special legal protection, called aforamiento. Meanwhile, other members of Congress who are not part of the Permanent Deputation are only eligible to request an indemnity.

== Composition (2023–present) ==
=== Chamber of Deputies (XV legislature) ===
Political party	Main ideology	Members	Current members
Podemos	Left-wing populism Democratic socialism	Ione Belarra; Javier Sánchez Serna; Noemí Santana; Martina Velarde; Lilith Verstrynge (until January 2024)	Ione Belarra; Javier Sánchez Serna; Noemí Santana; Martina Velarde
Canarian Coalition	Regionalism; Canarian nationalism Centrism	Cristina Valido	
Galician Nationalist Bloc	Galician nationalism Left-wing nationalism Socialism	Néstor Rego	
Més–Compromís	Valencianism; Progressivism; Green politics	Àgueda Micó	
Navarrese People's Union	Conservatism; Christian democracy Navarrese regionalism	Alberto Catalán	
Others, non-party independents		Javier Ortega Smith (formerly Vox); José Luis Ábalos (formerly PSOE, until January 2026)	Javier Ortega Smith
Total		11	9

=== Senate (XV legislature) ===
Political party	Main ideology	Members	Current members
Vox	Right-wing populism Ultranationalism; National conservatism	Fernando Carbonell Tatay; Paloma Gómez Enríquez; Ángel Pelayo Gordillo (until February 2026)	Fernando Carbonell Tatay; Paloma Gómez Enríquez
Navarrese People's Union	Conservatism; Christian democracy Navarrese regionalism	María del Mar Caballero	
Others, non-party independents		José Ignacio Landaluce (formerly PP)	
Total		5	4

== Former compositions ==
=== Chamber of Deputies ===
Legislature	Composition	Seats	Notes
IV Legislature	Herri Batasuna	4	
IV Legislature	Andalusian Party	2	
IV Legislature	Eusko Alkartasuna	2	
IV Legislature	Valencian Union	2	
IV Legislature	Euskadiko Ezkerra	2	
IV Legislature	Aragonese Party	1	
IV Legislature	Canarian Independent Groups	1	
V Legislature	Herri Batasuna	2	
V Legislature	Republican Left of Catalonia	1	
V Legislature	Eusko Alkartasuna	1	
V Legislature	Valencian Union	1	
V Legislature	Aragonese Party	1	
VI Legislature	Democratic Party of the New Left	3	Elected under the United Left alliance, it emerged as a split in the party that favored a closer approach the PSOE and were expelled from IU in September 1997.
VI Legislature	Initiative for Catalonia Greens	2	In October 1997 it severed ties with United Left due to disagreements over strategy and political alliances.
VI Legislature	Herri Batasuna	2	
VI Legislature	Galician Nationalist Bloc	2	
VI Legislature	Republican Left of Catalonia	1	
VI Legislature	Eusko Alkartasuna	1	
VI Legislature	Valencian Union	1	
VI Legislature	Aragonese Party	1	Contested the elections alongside the PP and initially joined its parliamentary group. In October 1999, they left the PP group, citing political disagreements with the party.
VII Legislature	Galician Nationalist Bloc	3	
VII Legislature	Chunta Aragonesista	1	
VII Legislature	Eusko Alkartasuna	1	
VII Legislature	Republican Left of Catalonia	1	
VII Legislature	Initiative for Catalonia Greens	1	
VII Legislature	Andalusian Party	1	
VII Legislature	Non-inscrit	1	Cristina Alberdi left the Spanish Socialist Workers' Party group in December 2003.
VIII Legislature	Canarian Coalition	3	
VIII Legislature	Galician Nationalist Bloc	2	
VIII Legislature	Nafarroa Bai	1	
VIII Legislature	Chunta Aragonesista	1	
VIII Legislature	Eusko Alkartasuna	1	
VIII Legislature	Non-inscrit	1	Joaquín Calomarde left the People's Party group in April 2007, citing discrepancies with the party's political line.
IX Legislature	Galician Nationalist Bloc	2	
IX Legislature	Canarian Coalition-Canarian Nationalist Party	2	
IX Legislature	Navarrese People's Union	1	Contested the elections alongside the PP and initially joined its parliamentary group. In October 2008, one of its deputies, Carlos Salvador, left the group after discrepancies with the vote in the General State Budget. The other member of UPN, Santiago Cervera, joined the People's Party.
IX Legislature	Nafarroa Bai	1	
IX Legislature	Union, Progress and Democracy	1	
X Legislature	Amaiur	7	
X Legislature	Republican Left of Catalonia	3	
X Legislature	Galician Nationalist Bloc	2	
X Legislature	Canarian Coalition-Canarian Nationalist Party	2	
X Legislature	Compromís	1	
X Legislature	Asturias Forum	1	
X Legislature	Geroa Bai	1	
X Legislature	Navarrese People's Union	1	
XI Legislature	Compromís	4	
XI Legislature	Popular Unity	2	
XI Legislature	EH Bildu	2	
XI Legislature	Navarrese People's Union	2	
XI Legislature	Canarian Coalition-Canarian Nationalist Party	1	
XI Legislature	Asturias Forum	1	
XI Legislature	New Canaries	1	
XI Legislature	Non-inscrit	1	Pedro Ramón Gómez de la Serna was expelled from the People's Party and joined the Mixed Group in January 2016.
XII Legislature	Democratic Convergence of Catalonia	8	
XII Legislature	Compromís	4	Contested the elections under the A la valenciana coalition, which obtained 9 seats. The party later decided to join the Mixed Group.
XII Legislature	EH Bildu	2	
XII Legislature	Navarrese People's Union	2	
XII Legislature	Canarian Coalition-Canarian Nationalist Party	1	
XII Legislature	Asturias Forum	1	
XII Legislature	New Canaries	1	
XIII Legislature	Together for Catalonia	7	Jordi Sànchez, Jordi Turull and Josep Rull couldn't join their parliamentary group because they had been suspended from their duties following their placement in pretrial detention, and the Chamber’s rules prevent suspended deputies from being part of parliamentary groups
XIII Legislature	EH Bildu	4	
XIII Legislature	Sum Navarre	2	
XIII Legislature	Canarian Coalition-Canarian Nationalist Party	1	
XIII Legislature	Compromís	1	
XIII Legislature	Regionalist Party of Cantabria	1	
XIII Legislature	Republican Left of Catalonia	1	Oriol Junqueras couldn't join his parliamentary group because he had been suspended from his duties following his placement in pretrial detention, and the Chamber’s rules prevent suspended deputies from being part of parliamentary groups.
XIV Legislature	Popular Unity Candidacy	2	
XIV Legislature	Canarian Coalition-New Canaries	2	The coalition won two seats, one for Canarian Coalition and another for New Canaries. However, midway through the legislative term, the New Canaries deputy Pedro Quevedo stepped down and was replaced by María Fernández of Canarian Coalition.
XIV Legislature	Asturias Forum	1	
XIV Legislature	Regionalist Party of Cantabria	1	
XIV Legislature	Teruel Exists	1	
XIV Legislature	Non-inscrit	4	Sergio Sayas and Carlos García Adanero, both from UPN, had their party membership suspended for voting against the labor reform that their party had agreed upon with the Government. Pablo Cambronero was elected on the Citizens party list but left the party on March 2021 due to ideological differences. María del Carmen Pita was elected within Unidas Podemos but left the parliamentary group on March 2022 due to disagreements with the party's leadership.

=== Senate ===
Legislature	Composition		Seats	Notes
XIV Legislature	Elected	Vox	2	
XIV Legislature	Elected	Teruel Exists	2	Left the Mixed Group to join the Democratic parliamentary group.
XIV Legislature	Elected	Navarrese People's Union	1	
XIV Legislature	Elected	Gomera Socialist Group	1	Left the Mixed Group to join the Confederal Left parliamentary group.
XIV Legislature	Elected	Non-inscrit	1	Ruth Goñi resigned from Citizens arguing that the party had taken an ideological turn and criticized the party’s pacts with the PSOE.
XIV Legislature	Designated	Vox	1	
XIV Legislature	Designated	Aragonese Party	1	
XIV Legislature	Designated	Regionalist Party of Cantabria	1	Left the Mixed Group to join the Democratic parliamentary group.
XIV Legislature	Designated	Non-inscrit	1	Emilio Argüeso was expelled from Citizens following accusations that he had made public statements contrary to the party's interests.

== Regional parliaments ==
The regional parliaments of the Autonomous Communities of Spain have also laws regulating the existence and use of the Mixed Groups within their chambers.
