= Bureaus of the Cortes Generales =

Governing bodies of legislative branch of Spanish government

The Bureaus of the Cortes Generales are the governing bodies of each House of the Cortes Generales, the legislative branch of Spain. The Bureaus are made up of the President or Speaker of the House, the Vice Presidents or Deputy Speakers and the Secretaries. Each Bureau is regulated by the standing orders of its house.

== Collective Presidency ==
There are traditionally two models for the presidency of a parliamentary assembly, the collective presidency composed of a bureau and individual speakership.

The collegiate or collective presidency is composed of members that reflect the political make-up of the chamber. Its role is to organise the House's work and establish the order of business. The president or speaker chairs the bureau (in addition to their other roles). This model has been called the "continental European model" since it has been adopted by most European parliaments including Spain.

The second model is an individual speakership in which the holder of the office is the sole guarantor of the chamber’s independence and privileges, of which the archetype is the Speaker at Westminster. In this model, supervising the House's work is performed by others (for example, in many British Commonwealth countries, the Leader of the House). The United States House of Representatives represents a variation of this model with the Speaker being also the leader of the majority in the chamber, in contrast to the Speaker at Westminster who rejects all political affiliation.

== Functions ==
The Bureaus broad functions are to supervise administrative matters such as the timetable for public sittings of the House and its committees, and be responsible for the organisation of the parliaments work, such as determining the admissibility of proposals, bills & documents and deciding on the house's order of business.

Other bodies provide advice to the Bureau including the Board of Spokespersons (Spanish: Junta de Portavoces) made up of representatives of all parliamentary groups who must be consulted on the chamber's order of business and the Clerk (chief legal counsel, Spanish: Letrado Mayor del Congreso de Diputados) who is also by convention the Secretary General (Spanish: Secretario General). The Clerk, (who is a public servant appointed by the Bureau on the nomination of the Speaker) advises the Bureau on parliamentary law, practice and procedure and charged with the actual administration of the parliament.

More concretely, the functions of the Bureau of the Congress of Deputies are:

- To define the internal regulation and management of the House
- To prepare the House's budget, direct and control its execution, and report on its implementation to the House at the end of each fiscal year
- To authorise the expenses of the House
- To determine the admissibility of parliamentary papers and documents
- To decide upon the consideration of all parliamentary papers and documents
- To arrange the general proceedings of the Congress, draw up the order of business of plenary sittings and of committees for each session and coordinate the business of the various bodies, upon previous consultation in each case with the Board of Spokespersons
- appoint the Clerk (chief legal counsel, Spanish: Letrado Mayor del Congreso de Diputados)

The functions of the Bureau of the Senate are:

- To fix the starting and the closing dates of sessions of the Senate
- To determine the timetable of activities of the Plenary Sitting and the Committees
- To assess parliamentary papers and documents, and decide on their admissibility and processing
- To take such decisions and measures as may be required for the organisation of tasks and the internal governance and system of the Senate
- To approve Senate's budget, directing and controlling its implementation
- To approve regulations on matters pertaining to the budget, control, accounting and procurement for the organisation and functioning of the Senate.
- To approve regulations to ensure the transparency of the activities of the Senate and the right of access to public information of the Senate

=== Power to suspend members ===
In May 2019 following the investiture of four elected members of Congress who were in preventive detention and on trial over their role in Catalonia’s failed independence bid in 2017, and following a decision of the Supreme Court that it was within the powers of the Bureau of Congress to do so, the Bureau decided to suspend the four deputies from all their duties and rights as members of Congress.

== Electing the Bureau ==
After national elections, the first sitting of each house is called the constituent or constitutive sitting, the function of which is to elect the Bureau. The first step is to establish a temporary body composed by the oldest member of each House which acts as Acting Speaker and two secretaries which are the youngest members of the House. This body oversees the electoral process of the Bureaus.

The Bureaus' members are elected among and by the members of the houses by means of secret ballot. The Speaker is elected by absolute majority or, failing that, through plurality in a second round between the two candidates that received most votes in the first round. The other members are elected using the single non-transferable vote method which ensures plurality, i.e. representation of the largest parties in the Congress.

After the Bureau is elected, the Speaker declares the House constituted, and adjourns the sitting and notifies the King, the other House and the Government.

== Members ==
=== Speaker ===
The Speakers or Presidents of the respective House and are the supreme authority within its Chamber and they chair the Chamber's Bureau.

=== Deputy Speakers ===
The Deputy Speakers or Vice Presidents are hierarchically numbered (1st deputy, 2nd deputy) and they deputise, in order of precedence, for the Speaker. This happens in cases of vacancy or absence.

=== Secretaries ===
The Secretaries supervise and authorize, with the approval of the Speaker, the Minutes of the parliamentary sessions, of the Bureau and of the Board of Spokespersons, as well as the certifications that have to be issued, they assist the Speaker in the sessions to ensure order in the debates and the correction in the votes; they collaborate in the normal development of the works of their House according to the provisions of the Speaker; and they also exercise any other functions entrusted to them by the Speaker or the Bureau.

== Senate Bureau ==
The Spanish Senate is the upper house of the Cortes Generales and its standing orders were passed on 3 May 1994 and they have been modified at least twenty times. The Bureau acts under the authority and direction of the Speaker. The Senate Bureau must be elected in the constitutive session and it is composed by the President of the Senate, two Vice Presidents and two Secretaries.

sinmarco Bureau of the Senate
Office	Name	Party
Speaker	Pedro Rollán	People's Party
First Deputy Speaker	Javier Maroto	People's Party
Second Deputy Speaker	Guillermo Fernández Vara	Socialist Party
First Secretary	Eva Ortiz Vilella	People's Party
Second Secretary	María del Mar Blanco	People's Party
Third Secretary	Mª Ángeles Luna Morales	Socialist Party
Fourth Secretary	Francisco Manuel Fajardo	Socialist Party

== Bureau of the Congress of Deputies ==
The Congress of Deputies is the lower house of the Cortes Generales and its standing orders were passed on 24 February 1982 and they have been modified at least twelve times.

The Bureau of the Congress is directed and coordinated by the Speaker of the Congress of Deputies. Because of the large size of the Congress compared to the Senate, the Bureau of the Congress is composed by the Speaker of the Congress, acting as chairperson, four Deputy Speakers and four Secretaries.

Bureau of the Congress of Deputies
Office	Name	Party
Speaker	Francina Armengol	Socialist Party
First Deputy Speaker	Alfonso Rodríguez	Socialist Party
Second Deputy Speaker	José Antonio Bermúdez de Castro	People's Party
Third Deputy Speaker	Esther Gil de Reboleño Lastortres	Sumar
Fourth Deputy Speaker	Marta González Vázquez	People's Party
First Secretary	Gerardo Pisarello	Sumar
Second Secretary	Isaura Leal Fernández	Socialist Party
Third Secretary	Guillermo Mariscal Anaya	People's Party
Fourth Secretary	Carmen Navarro Lacoba	People's Party

== Other bureaus ==
Each House of the Cortes Generales has a number of standing committees (Spanish: commissiones) and each is governed by its own bureau. As a general rule, both Senate Committees and Congressional Committees and are composed of a Chairperson, two Deputy Chairpersons and two Secretaries all of them elected from the committee members.

There are some exceptions where the chairperson of some committees is not elected. This is the case for the Rules Committee of each House which is chaired by the Speaker of the House and the General Committee for the Autonomous Communities in the Senate, which is chaired by the Senate Speaker.

== Bibliography ==
- "Standing Orders of the Congress of Deputies" (PDF). Congress of Deputies.
- "Standing Orders of the Senate". Senado de España. Senado de España.
- Bergougnous, Georges (1997). Presiding Officers of National Parliamentary Assemblies. Geneva: Inter-Parliamentary Union. ISBN 92-9142-028-X.
