= Parliamentary group (Spain) =

Spanish parliamentary political parties

Parliamentary groups in Spain are the institutionalisation or parliamentarisation, of political parties.

Groups are unified actors with only one voice and together with committees (Spanish: comisiones) and are the main actors in Parliament. In other words the Spanish Parliament is a parliament of groups, not individual MPs who are constrained to act only as part of the group. MPs can only act autonomously when submitting oral or written questions.

All MPs are required to be members of a parliamentary group, usually of the party with whom they were associated when elected but groups can be made up of more than one party (usually when they share an ideology) to increase their profile in Parliament. MPs that cannot satisfy the rules for forming a group join the so-called Mixed Group. Further, parliamentary resources are distributed to groups, not individual MPs.

Each group has at least a President (party leader) and a Spokesperson, or party whip. The spokesperson votes on behalf of the entire group of members in parliamentary debate and the parliamentary committees with their vote weighted in proportion to the size of the group. The whip approves proposed amendments to bills and is the sole member of the group that can speak in debates in parliament. Individual MP’s can proposal bills but they must first be signed by at least 15 MPs which clearly means it will only be accepted if the group supports the bill.

Together, the Spokespersons form the Board of Spokespersons in each house, the council of party representatives in the chamber (Spanish: Junta de Portavoces). The primary function of this Board is to advise the house’s Bureau on the parliamentary agenda. However the Board also to decide on the composition of parliamentary committees.

Parliamentary Groups also appoint members to the Permanent Deputation (Spanish: Diputación Permanente) of each house, the role of which is to assume the powers of the relevant house when dissolved and safeguard the house’s privileges when not in session.

Parliamentary groups also exist in the regional legislatures. The European Parliament has an analogue called political groups. More generally Parliamentary group is also used.

== National legislature ==
=== Senate ===
According to the Standing Orders of the Senate, the Senate's parliamentary groups needs a minimum of 10 senators to be formed and during the term of the legislature, this number can not go below 6 senators. In this case, the group would be dissolved.

Each group can freely choose their name and they have to present before the Bureau of the Senate in the five days after the constitutive session the request in which they must to indicate which senators will form part of the parliamentary group. In the case of regional senators (appointed by the regional legislatures), they have five days from their appointment to join one of the parliamentary groups.

The Senate's parliamentary groups are subdivided in Territorial Groups. These groups are formed by a minimum of 3 senators belonging to specific constituencies.

As of December 2024, in the 15th Senate, these are the Senate' parliamentary groups:

Party or alliance	Leader	Spokesperson	MPs
Popular Parliamentary Group (GPP): People's Party (PP)	Alberto Núñez Feijóo	Alicia García Rodríguez	145
Socialist Parliamentary Group (GPS): Spanish Socialist Workers' Party (PSOE); Socialists' Party of Catalonia (PSC); Socialist Party of the Basque Country–Basque Country Left (PSE–EE); Socialists' Party of Galicia (PSdeG)	Pedro Sánchez (PM)	Juan Espadas	89
Left for Independence Parliamentary Group (GPERB): Republican Left of Catalonia (ERC); EH Bildu (EHB)	Sara Bailac		9
Plural Parliamentary Group (GPN): Together for Catalonia (JxCat); Galician Nationalist Bloc (BNG); Canarian Coalition (CC); Independent Herrenian Group (AHI)	Josep Lluís Cleries		7
Basque Parliamentary Group (GPV): Basque Nationalist Party (EAJ/PNV); Socialists' Party of Galicia (PSdeG) (1)	Estefanía Beltrán de Heredia		6
Confederal Left Parliamentary Group (GPIC): Spanish Socialist Workers' Party (PSOE) (1); Gomera Socialist Group (ASG); Geroa Bai (GBai); Más Madrid (MM); Compromís; 1 Independent	Carla Antonelli		6
Mixed Parliamentary Group (GPMX): Vox; Navarrese People's Union (UPN)	Paloma Gómez Enríquez		4

=== Congress of Deputies ===
The Congress of Deputies is the lower house of the Cortes Generales and the strongest of both houses. The requirements to form a parliamentary group in Congress are more complex:

- The parliamentary groups needs a minimum of 15 MPs.
- In the case of not having 15 MPs, the parliamentary groups with no less than 5 MPs with a 5% of the national vote or a 15% of vote in their constituency, can form a parliamentary group.

As in the Senate, the parliamentary groups have to be formed within the five days after the constitutive session of the House and they need the approval of the Bureau of the Congress.

As of February 2024, in the 15th Cortes Generales, these are the Congress' parliamentary groups:

Party or alliance	Leader	Spokesperson	Ideology	MPs
Popular Parliamentary Group (GPP): People's Party (PP)	Alberto Núñez Feijóo	Cuca Gamarra	Conservatism; Christian democracy	137
Socialist Parliamentary Group (GPS): Spanish Socialist Workers' Party (PSOE); Socialists' Party of Catalonia (PSC)	Pedro Sánchez (PM)	Patxi López	Social democracy	121
Vox Parliamentary Group (GPVOX): Vox (Vox)	Santiago Abascal	Pepa Millán	Right-wing populism National conservatism	33
Plurinational Sumar Parliamentary Group (GPPS): United Left (IU); Catalunya en Comú (Comuns); Sumar Movement (SMR); More Madrid (MM)	Yolanda Díaz (SDPM)	Verónica Martínez	Left-wing populism Democratic socialism	27
Republican Parliamentary Group: Republican Left of Catalonia (ERC)	Oriol Junqueras	Gabriel Rufián	Catalan independence Social democracy Democratic socialism	7
Together for Catalonia Parliamentary Group: Together for Catalonia (Junts)	Carles Puigdemont	Míriam Nogueras	Catalan independence Populism	7
Euskal Herria Bildu Parliamentary Group (GPEHB): EH Bildu (EHB)	Arnaldo Otegi	Mertxe Aizpurua	Basque independence Socialism; Left-wing nationalism	6
Basque Parliamentary Group (GPV): Basque Nationalist Party (EAJ/PNV)	Aitor Esteban		Basque nationalism Christian democracy	5
Mixed Parliamentary Group (GPMX): We Can (Podemos); Galician Nationalist Bloc (BNG); Canarian Coalition (CC); Navarrese People's Union (UPN)	Ione Belarra; Néstor Rego; Cristina Valido García Alberto Catalán		This group is formed by MPs without a parliamentary group, so the ideology is diverse.	7

== Bibliography ==
- Jalali, Carlos; Rodríguez Teruel, Juan (2019). "Parliamentary party groups in the Iberian democracies" (PDF). In Fernandes, Jorge M.; Leston-Bandeira, Cristina (eds.). The Iberian Legislatures in Comparative Perspective. Routledge. pp. 49–70. ISBN 9781351065214.
- Sánchez de Dios, Manuel (1999). "Parliamentary Party Discipline in Spain" (PDF). In Bowler, Shaun; Farrell, David; Katz, Richard (eds.). Party Discipline and Parliamentary Government. Ohio State University Press. pp. 141–162. ISBN 0-8142-5000-9.
- "Standing Orders of the Congress of Deputies" (PDF). Congress of Deputies.
- "Standing Orders of the Senate". Senado de España. Senado de España.
- "The Political groups of the European Parliament". European Parliament. European Parliament.

=== Notes ===
The parliamentary groups are divided according to political parties. Groups of less than 6 senators do exist because other political parties lend their senators to other parties in order to allow them to have a parliamentary group.
