= Hypothetical opinion polling for the 2026 Spanish general election =

In the run up to the 2026 Spanish general election, various organisations carry out opinion polling to gauge voting intention in Spain for a number of hypothetical scenarios during the term of the 15th Cortes Generales. Results of such polls are displayed in this article. The date range for these opinion polls is from the previous general election, held on 23 July 2023, to the day the next election will be held, on 29 November 2026.

== Left-wing platform ==
=== Sumar + Podemos ===
Polling firm/Commissioner	Fieldwork date	Sample size	Turnout	PP	PSOE	Vox	FA	ERC	Junts	EH Bildu	PNV	BNG	CCa	UPN	Adelante Andalucía (2021)	SALF	Lead
Target Point/El Debate	6–9 Oct 2026	1,002	67.6	32.0; 131/133	25.9; 102/104	18.7; 62/64	10.3; 20/21	? 8/10	? 5/6	? 7	? 5/6	? 2/3	–	–	? 2	1.3; 0	6.1
40dB/Prisa	7–8 Oct 2026	800	?	31.9; 119/134	27.3; 102/112	19.1; 63/72	9.5; 15/19	? 8	? 7	? 7	? 6	? 2	? 1	? 1	? 1	1.8; 0	4.6
SocioMétrica/El Español	2–4 Jul 2026	1,416	?	33.2; 141	23.3; 89	16.9; 54	13.3; 37	? 7	? 5	? 7	? 5	? 2	0.5; 1	0.2; 1	–	2.2; 0	9.9
NC Report/La Razón	25 Jun–1 Jul 2026	1,000	62.8	34.5; 140/144	25.0; 94/98	17.8; 59/61	9.7; 18/20	2.0; 7	1.6; 6	1.4; 6	1.0; 5	0.8; 2	0.4; 1	0.2; 1	–	–	9.5
SocioMétrica/El Español	15–18 Apr 2026	1,712	?	31.8; 138	27.0; 108	16.9; 57	10.0; 19	1.8; 7	1.2; 5	1.3; 6	1.1; 5	0.8; 2	0.4; 1	0.2; 1	–	2.6; 0	4.8
Ateneo del Dato/elDiario.es	18–22 Feb 2026	2,000	?	29.0; 113/117	26.7; 102/106	20.0; 68/71	12.1; 29/31	–	–	–	–	–	–	–	–	–	2.3

=== Sumar + Podemos + ERC + EH Bildu + BNG ===
Polling firm/Commissioner	Fieldwork date	Sample size	Turnout	PP	PSOE	Vox	FA	Junts	PNV	CCa	UPN	SALF	Lead
NC Report/La Razón	25 Jun–1 Jul 2026	1,000	62.8	34.5; 139/143	25.0; 93/97	17.8; 58/60	13.9; 34/38	1.6; 6	1.0; 5	0.4; 1	0.2; 1	–	9.5
40dB/Prisa	20–23 Feb 2026	2,000	?	30.2	24.4	18.7	17.7	–	–	–	–	2.2	5.8
Ateneo del Dato/elDiario.es	18–22 Feb 2026	2,000	?	28.8; 111/115	24.4; 97/103	20.1; 65/71	19.7; 58/63	–	–	–	–	–	4.4

=== PSOE + Sumar + Podemos ===
Polling firm/Commissioner	Fieldwork date	Sample size	Turnout	PP	FA	Vox	Lead
Ateneo del Dato/elDiario.es	18–22 Feb 2026	2,000	?	30.3; 111/116	37.3; 140/146	20.6; 66/70	7.0
