= Nationwide opinion polling for the 2026 Spanish general election (2023–2024) =

In the run up to the 2026 Spanish general election, various organisations carry out opinion polling to gauge voting intention in Spain during the term of the 15th Cortes Generales. Results of such polls are displayed in this article. The date range for these opinion polls is from the previous general election, held on 23 July 2023, to the day the next election was held, on 23 July 2023. This article displays polls conducted between 2019 and 2021.

Voting intention estimates refer mainly to a hypothetical Congress of Deputies election. Polls are listed in reverse chronological order, showing the most recent first and using the dates when the survey fieldwork was done, as opposed to the date of publication. Where the fieldwork dates are unknown, the date of publication is given instead. The highest percentage figure in each polling survey is displayed with its background shaded in the leading party's colour. If a tie ensues, this is applied to the figures with the highest percentages. The "Lead" columns on the right shows the percentage-point difference between the parties with the highest percentages in a poll.

The tables below list nationwide voting intention estimates. Refusals are generally excluded from the party vote percentages, while question wording and the treatment of "don't know" responses and those not intending to vote may vary between polling organisations. When available, seat projections determined by the polling organisations are displayed below (or in place of) the percentages in a smaller font; 176 seats are required for an absolute majority in the Congress of Deputies.

== Polling ==
=== 2024 ===
Polling firm/Commissioner	Fieldwork date	Sample size	Turnout	PP	PSOE	Vox	Sumar	ERC	Junts	EH Bildu	PNV	BNG	CCa	UPN	Adelante Andalucía (2021)	Podemos	SALF	Lead
SocioMétrica/El Español	26–30 Dec	2,953	?	33.5; 146	28.3; 116	14.1; 42	7.1; 12	1.9; 8	1.5; 7	1.4; 7	1.1; 5	0.7; 2	0.4; 1	0.2; 1	–	4.2; 3	2.5; 0	5.2
Target Point/El Debate	26–30 Dec	1,002	?	32.7; 142/144	28.5; 118/119	14.9; 45/46	6.9; 10/11	–	–	–	–	–	–	–	–	5.0; 4/6	2.3; 0/1	4.2
NC Report/La Razón	20–27 Dec	1,000	65.0	35.1; 150/152	28.0; 115/117	13.9; 40/42	5.3; 7/8	1.6; 6	1.8; 8	1.5; 6	1.2; 5	0.8; 2	0.4; 1	0.2; 1	–	4.5; 4/5	–	7.3
EM-Analytics/Electomanía	20–27 Dec	1,037	?	33.5; 142	28.8; 120	14.6; 40	5.8; 9	1.8; 7	2.0; 8	1.4; 7	1.2; 6	0.8; 2	0.5; 1	0.2; 1	0.1; 0	4.4; 7	2.7; 0	4.7
40dB/Prisa	20–26 Dec	2,000	?	33.0	29.5	13.8	5.1	–	–	–	–	–	–	–	–	4.0	2.4	3.5
Sigma Dos/El Mundo	13–26 Dec	2,485	?	34.4; 152	27.1; 113	12.4; 39	6.4; 10	1.9; 8	1.8; 8	1.1; 6	1.0; 6	1.0; 2	0.4; 1	0.3; 1	–	4.7; 3	3.3; 1	7.3
KeyData/Público	22 Dec	?	67.2	33.8; 148	28.2; 117	13.6; 40	6.3; 10	1.7; 7	1.7; 8	1.4; 6	1.2; 6	0.7; 2	? 1	? 1	–	4.1; 4	2.4; 0	5.6
EM-Analytics/Electomanía	14–21 Dec	2,447	?	33.7; 145	28.4; 115	14.9; 42	5.5; 8	1.9; 7	1.9; 8	1.4; 7	1.2; 6	0.8; 2	0.4; 1	0.2; 1	0.1; 0	4.5; 7	2.9; 1	5.3
EM-Analytics/Electomanía	7–13 Dec	4,081	?	33.5; 142	28.7; 119	14.6; 40	5.3; 8	1.8; 7	1.9; 8	1.4; 7	1.2; 6	0.7; 2	0.4; 1	0.2; 1	0.1; 0	4.7; 9	2.7; 0	4.8
Hamalgama Métrica/Vozpópuli	10–12 Dec	1,000	?	34.9; 151	28.1; 117	13.2; 40	5.8; 9	1.7; 6	1.9; 8	1.4; 6	1.2; 5	0.8; 2	0.5; 1	0.2; 1	–	4.2; 4	1.8; 0	6.8
Sondaxe/La Voz de Galicia	5–11 Dec	1,111	?	32.6; 142	28.2; 117	14.3; 44	7.9; 14	1.6; 7	1.4; 7	1.5; 7	1.1; 6	1.1; 2	0.6; 1	0.3; 1	–	4.0; 2	–	4.4
CIS	2–9 Dec	4,621	?	28.4	32.2	12.2	7.0	1.7	1.2	1.1	1.2	0.9	0.3	0.1	–	4.1	2.8	3.8
EM-Analytics/Electomanía	29 Nov–6 Dec	2,102	?	33.0; 142	28.4; 119	14.0; 39	5.7; 9	1.8; 7	1.8; 8	1.4; 7	1.2; 6	0.8; 2	0.4; 1	0.2; 1	0.1; 0	4.7; 9	2.6; 0	4.6
GESOP/Prensa Ibérica	2–4 Dec	1,001	?	31.1; 135/139	28.3; 117/121	14.9; 45/49	8.0; 13/15	1.8; 7	1.6; 7	–	–	–	–	–	–	3.5; 2/4	2.3; 0/1	2.8
Sigma Dos/El Mundo	25 Nov–4 Dec	2,017	?	34.8; 156	27.4; 115	11.9; 33	6.2; 9	1.9; 8	1.7; 8	1.3; 6	1.1; 6	0.9; 2	0.5; 1	0.3; 1	–	5.0; 4	3.1; 1	7.4
NC Report/La Razón	25–29 Nov	1,000	64.9	35.5; 151/153	28.4; 116/118	13.5; 37/39	5.4; 7/8	1.7; 6	2.0; 8/9	1.5; 6	1.3; 6	0.8; 2	0.5; 1	0.2; 1	–	4.2; 4	–	7.3
EM-Analytics/Electomanía	22–29 Nov	1,447	?	32.8; 142	28.1; 117	14.2; 40	5.6; 9	1.7; 7	1.9; 8	1.4; 7	1.3; 6	0.8; 2	0.4; 1	0.2; 1	0.1; 0	4.6; 9	2.9; 1	4.7
40dB/Prisa	25–27 Nov	2,000	?	33.3	29.9	13.1	5.0	–	–	–	–	–	–	–	–	2.8	3.1	3.4
EM-Analytics/Electomanía	23–26 Nov	804	?	33.0; 142	28.5; 120	13.8; 38	5.5; 8	1.7; 7	1.9; 8	1.4; 7	1.3; 6	0.7; 2	0.4; 1	0.2; 1	0.1; 0	4.7; 9	3.5; 1	4.5
SocioMétrica/El Español	22–24 Nov	1,227	?	34.8; 152	26.7; 109	13.5; 40	6.9; 13	1.8; 7	1.8; 7	1.3; 7	1.1; 5	0.9; 2	0.7; 2	0.3; 1	–	3.6; 3	2.7; 0	8.1
KeyData/Público	23 Nov	?	68.0	33.2; 147	28.3; 118	13.1; 39	6.9; 11	1.7; 7	1.8; 8	1.4; 6	1.2; 6	0.7; 2	? 1	? 1	–	4.8; 4	2.4; 0	4.9
Target Point/El Debate	20–22 Nov	1,303	?	32.2; 141/143	28.3; 118/120	14.6; 42/44	5.7; 7/9	–	–	–	–	–	–	–	–	4.7; 4/6	2.9; 0/2	3.9
Ipsos/La Vanguardia	18–22 Nov	1,178	?	33.8; 145	28.4; 119	14.5; 45	5.9; 7	2.0; 8	1.6; 7	1.4; 7	1.3; 6	0.7; 2	0.4; 1	0.2; 1	–	3.4; 2	1.9; 0	5.4
EM-Analytics/Electomanía	16–22 Nov	1,352	?	32.5; 141	29.0; 122	13.4; 37	5.3; 8	1.7; 7	1.9; 8	1.4; 7	1.3; 6	0.7; 2	0.4; 1	0.2; 1	0.1; 0	4.8; 9	3.5; 1	3.5
EM-Analytics/Electomanía	9–15 Nov	1,206	?	33.0; 144	29.2; 124	13.0; 32	5.0; 7	1.8; 7	2.0; 8	1.4; 7	1.2; 6	0.7; 2	0.3; 0	0.2; 1	0.1; 0	5.0; 11	3.3; 1	3.8
Celeste-Tel/Onda Cero	7–15 Nov	1,100	64.8	34.9; 151	28.7; 119	12.4; 37	5.8; 9	1.6; 6	2.0; 9	1.5; 6	1.3; 5	0.8; 2	0.5; 1	0.2; 1	–	5.1; 4	1.9; 0	6.2
GAD3/Mediaset	11–14 Nov	1,036	?	32.5; 141	27.7; 111	15.6; 54	6.0; 8	–	–	–	–	–	–	–	–	4.0; 4	2.3; 0	4.8
DYM/Henneo	8–11 Nov	1,015	?	33.1; 145/149	28.2; 118/122	12.6; 32/35	7.5; 12/14	–	–	–	–	–	–	–	–	4.9; 3/4	1.6; 0/1	4.9
Hamalgama Métrica/Vozpópuli	5–8 Nov	1,000	?	35.3; 155	28.5; 118	12.5; 36	5.8; 9	1.7; 6	1.9; 8	1.4; 6	1.3; 5	0.8; 2	0.5; 1	0.2; 1	–	4.2; 3	1.7; 0	6.8
EM-Analytics/Electomanía	30 Oct–8 Nov	2,104	?	33.2; 144	28.5; 121	13.2; 36	5.0; 7	1.7; 7	1.9; 8	1.4; 7	1.2; 6	0.8; 2	0.5; 1	0.2; 1	0.1; 0	4.6; 9	3.5; 1	4.7
CIS (Logoslab) (Note: Alternative projection based on raw CIS data.)	2–7 Nov	4,010	?	31.8; 137	29.6; 124	14.0; 44	7.0; 10	–	–	–	–	–	–	–	–	3.6; 3	2.1; 1	2.2
CIS	2–7 Nov	4,010	?	29.3	34.2	11.8	7.0	1.5	1.7	1.0	0.8	0.8	0.3	0.1	–	3.4	2.0	4.9
Sigma Dos/El Mundo	24–31 Oct	1,817	?	35.9; 160	28.2; 119	10.5; 27	5.5; 6	1.8; 8	2.0; 8	1.4; 6	1.3; 6	0.8; 2	0.6; 1	0.2; 1	–	4.9; 5	3.3; 1	7.7
EM-Analytics/Electomanía	18–25 Oct	1,091	?	35.4; 158	29.0; 119	11.4; 25	5.3; 8	1.9; 8	2.0; 8	1.4; 7	1.4; 6	0.8; 2	0.5; 1	0.2; 1	0.1; 0	4.2; 7	2.5; 0	6.4
KeyData/Público	24 Oct	?	70.1	35.0; 156	29.2; 122	10.8; 26	7.1; 12	1.7; 7	1.9; 8	1.4; 6	1.2; 6	0.7; 2	? 1	? 1	–	3.2; 2	3.2; 1	5.8
GAD3/ABC	21–24 Oct	1,018	?	34.1; 147	28.2; 115	12.9; 40	8.4; 15	1.7; 7	1.6; 7	1.4; 8	1.3; 6	1.0; 2	0.5; 1	0.1; 0	–	3.3; 2	1.9; 0	5.9
DYM/Henneo	16–18 Oct	1,000	?	36.9; 156/159	28.8; 116/120	11.2; 27/30	7.5; 12/14	–	–	–	–	–	–	–	–	2.5; 2/3	2.0; 1/2	8.1
Target Point/El Debate	16–18 Oct	1,020	?	35.2; 154/155	29.2; 123/124	10.6; 24/25	8.5; 13/14	–	–	–	–	–	–	–	–	3.1; 2/3	3.1; 2	6.0
SocioMétrica/El Español	16–18 Oct	2,240	?	35.2; 156	28.3; 120	11.2; 29	6.6; 10	1.6; 7	1.9; 8	1.4; 6	1.2; 6	0.8; 2	0.6; 1	0.2; 1	–	3.4; 3	3.4; 1	6.9
EM-Analytics/Electomanía	5–18 Oct	1,804	?	35.5; 158	28.7; 116	11.6; 26	6.7; 13	1.9; 7	2.0; 8	1.4; 7	1.4; 6	0.8; 2	0.5; 1	0.2; 1	0.1; 0	3.9; 5	2.3; 0	6.8
Hamalgama Métrica/Vozpópuli	8–11 Oct	1,000	?	35.2; 154	28.9; 124	11.4; 27	6.8; 11	1.7; 6	1.9; 8	1.5; 6	1.3; 6	0.8; 2	0.5; 1	0.2; 1	–	3.1; 2	3.0; 2	6.3
EM-Analytics/Electomanía	5–11 Oct	1,058	?	35.2; 157	29.2; 117	11.8; 27	6.6; 11	1.9; 7	2.0; 8	1.4; 7	1.4; 6	0.8; 2	0.5; 1	0.2; 1	0.1; 0	4.0; 6	2.4; 0	6.0
CIS (Logoslab)	1–11 Oct	4,005	?	32.0; 138	30.4; 125	13.5; 41	7.5; 12	–	–	–	–	–	–	–	–	3.6; 3	2.4; 1	1.6
CIS	1–11 Oct	4,005	?	31.5	34.0	11.8	6.3	1.6	1.2	0.9	1.0	0.8	0.3	0.1	–	3.3	1.7	2.5
Celeste-Tel/Onda Cero	4–9 Oct	1,100	66.5	35.7; 158	29.3; 122	10.7; 24	6.9; 13	1.7; 7	1.9; 8	1.5; 6	1.3; 5	0.8; 2	0.5; 1	0.2; 1	–	3.7; 3	2.6; 0	6.4
EM-Analytics/Electomanía	30 Sep–4 Oct	1,035	?	34.7; 151	29.9; 125	11.6; 26	6.4; 11	1.9; 7	2.0; 8	1.4; 7	1.4; 6	0.8; 2	0.5; 1	0.2; 1	0.1; 0	3.8; 5	2.4; 0	4.8
40dB/Prisa	25–27 Sep	2,000	?	34.6	29.7	10.5	6.1	–	–	–	–	–	–	–	–	2.7	4.9	4.9
Sigma Dos/El Mundo	20–27 Sep	1,909	?	35.5; 159	28.7; 124	9.5; 21	6.9; 12	1.8; 7	1.9; 8	1.3; 6	1.3; 6	0.8; 2	0.6; 1	0.2; 1	–	3.4; 2	3.3; 1	6.8
EM-Analytics/Electomanía	14–27 Sep	2,080	?	34.2; 150	30.6; 126	11.0; 25	6.2; 11	1.8; 7	1.9; 8	1.4; 6	1.3; 6	0.7; 2	0.4; 1	0.2; 1	0.1; 0	3.7; 5	3.3; 1	3.6
GESOP/Prensa Ibérica	23–26 Sep	1,004	?	33.3; 141/146	27.0; 105/110	13.0; 39/43	10.9; 26/30	1.5; 6/7	1.7; 7/8	–	–	–	–	–	–	3.1; 2	2.2; 0	6.3
KeyData/Público	21 Sep	?	69.9	34.4; 153	29.6; 125	10.7; 25	6.4; 10	1.7; 7	1.9; 8	1.4; 6	1.1; 6	0.7; 2	? 1	? 1	–	3.6; 3	3.9; 3	4.8
InvyMark/laSexta	16–20 Sep	?	?	37.1	30.1	10.9	6.0	–	–	–	–	–	–	–	–	–	–	7.0
EM-Analytics/Electomanía	14–20 Sep	1,404	?	33.8; 149	31.2; 129	10.3; 23	6.2; 10	1.8; 7	1.9; 8	1.3; 6	1.2; 6	0.7; 2	0.4; 1	0.2; 1	0.1; 0	3.6; 5	4.6; 2	2.6
Target Point/El Debate	18–19 Sep	1,001	?	34.6; 151/153	30.3; 127/128	10.0; 23/25	6.8; 10/11	–	–	–	–	–	–	–	–	4.4; 3/5	4.0; 2/4	4.3
EM-Analytics/Electomanía	7–13 Sep	1,327	?	34.0; 150	30.9; 127	10.1; 22	6.3; 11	1.8; 7	1.9; 8	1.3; 6	1.2; 6	0.7; 2	0.4; 1	0.2; 1	0.1; 0	3.5; 5	4.7; 3	3.1
Simple Lógica/elDiario.es	1–13 Sep	1,032	65.6	33.5	30.6	10.5	7.4	–	–	–	–	–	–	–	–	3.4	3.8	2.9
Hamalgama Métrica/Vozpópuli	3–6 Sep	1,000	?	34.9; 152	29.2; 125	11.3; 28	6.2; 10	1.6; 6	2.0; 8	1.5; 6	1.3; 5	0.8; 2	0.4; 1	0.2; 1	–	3.7; 3	3.9; 3	5.7
CIS (Logoslab)	2–6 Sep	4,027	?	32.3; 138	30.4; 126	13.3; 42	7.5; 12	–	–	–	–	–	–	–	–	3.6; 3	2.5; 1	1.9
CIS	2–6 Sep	4,027	?	28.5	33.0	13.1	7.8	1.4	1.3	1.1	0.9	0.8	0.3	0.1	–	3.6	2.9	4.5
Celeste-Tel/Onda Cero	2–6 Sep	1,100	66.3	35.5; 158	29.6; 125	10.4; 22	7.0; 12	1.7; 6	1.8; 7	1.5; 6	1.4; 6	0.8; 2	0.5; 1	0.2; 1	–	3.2; 2	3.3; 2	5.9
EM-Analytics/Electomanía	31 Aug–6 Sep	1,104	?	33.8; 149	31.1; 128	10.4; 24	6.1; 10	1.7; 7	1.8; 8	1.4; 6	1.3; 6	0.7; 2	0.4; 1	0.2; 1	0.1; 0	3.7; 5	4.6; 2	2.7
SocioMétrica/El Español	26–31 Aug	2,310	?	34.0; 150	29.1; 126	11.1; 27	6.1; 8	1.5; 7	2.0; 7	1.4; 6	1.3; 6	0.7; 1	0.5; 1	0.2; 1	–	4.6; 6	4.5; 4	4.9
EM-Analytics/Electomanía	1–30 Aug	1,973	?	33.5; 148	31.3; 131	10.2; 23	6.0; 10	1.6; 6	1.8; 8	1.4; 6	1.3; 6	0.7; 2	0.4; 1	0.2; 1	0.1; 0	3.8; 5	4.5; 2	2.2
Sigma Dos/El Mundo	22–29 Aug	2,383	?	35.4; 159	28.8; 123	9.6; 22	6.8; 11	1.8; 7	2.0; 8	1.4; 6	1.3; 6	0.8; 2	0.5; 1	0.2; 1	–	3.3; 2	3.4; 2	6.6
NC Report/La Razón	20–23 Aug	1,000	65.5	35.4; 157/160	28.7; 120/123	9.6; 23/24	6.0; 9/10	1.5; 6	1.8; 8/9	1.6; 6/7	1.3; 6	1.0; 2	0.4; 1	0.2; 1	–	3.5; 2/3	3.8; 2	6.7
40dB/Prisa	19–23 Aug	2,000	?	34.0	30.5	10.6	6.1	–	–	–	–	–	–	–	–	2.7	4.7	3.5
EM-Analytics/Electomanía	25 Jul–23 Aug	2,074	?	33.9; 149	31.0; 129	10.3; 24	6.1; 10	1.6; 6	1.8; 8	1.4; 6	1.3; 6	0.7; 2	0.4; 1	0.2; 1	0.1; 0	4.0; 5	4.5; 2	2.9
EM-Analytics/Electomanía	12 Jul–16 Aug	1,881	?	34.1; 149	30.6; 128	10.2; 24	6.0; 10	1.7; 7	1.7; 7	1.4; 6	1.3; 6	0.8; 2	0.4; 1	0.2; 1	0.1; 0	4.1; 5	4.7; 3	3.5
Simple Lógica/elDiario.es	1–9 Aug	1,055	60.1	33.5	30.5	10.5	7.7	–	–	–	–	–	–	–	–	2.9	3.7	3.0
EM-Analytics/Electomanía	12 Jul–9 Aug	1,273	?	34.0; 150	30.9; 130	10.4; 24	5.8; 9	1.6; 6	1.9; 8	1.4; 6	1.3; 6	0.7; 2	0.4; 1	0.2; 1	0.1; 0	4.1; 5	4.5; 2	3.1
Sigma Dos/El Mundo	5–8 Aug	2,102	?	35.3; 159	28.9; 124	9.9; 23	6.3; 9	2.0; 8	1.9; 8	1.4; 6	1.2; 6	0.7; 2	0.5; 1	0.2; 1	–	3.4; 2	3.1; 1	6.4
EM-Analytics/Electomanía	12–31 Jul	1,304	?	33.4; 148	31.1; 130	10.6; 24	5.9; 10	1.8; 7	2.0; 8	1.4; 6	1.3; 6	0.7; 2	0.4; 1	0.2; 1	0.1; 0	3.8; 5	4.1; 2	2.3
EM-Analytics/Electomanía	12–26 Jul	2,122	?	33.0; 146	32.0; 133	10.4; 24	6.0; 10	1.8; 7	1.8; 8	1.4; 6	1.4; 6	0.8; 2	0.4; 1	0.2; 1	0.1; 0	4.0; 5	4.1; 1	1.0
Target Point/El Debate	22 Jul	?	?	34.0; 148/150	30.8; 126/128	10.8; 26/28	5.8; 8/9	–	–	–	–	–	–	–	–	4.9; 4/5	4.1; 3/4	3.2
KeyData/Público	20 Jul	?	70.1	34.1; 148	30.3; 127	10.9; 28	6.0; 10	1.6; 7	1.8; 8	1.2; 6	1.1; 6	0.7; 2	? 1	? 1	–	3.7; 4	3.3; 2	3.8
SocioMétrica/El Español	18–20 Jul	1,200	?	34.4; 150	29.3; 121	11.2; 27	7.4; 11	1.5; 6	1.7; 6	1.5; 7	1.2; 6	0.8; 2	0.5; 1	0.2; 1	–	3.7; 9	4.1; 3	5.1
EM-Analytics/Electomanía	12–19 Jul	1,301	?	32.8; 145	32.2; 134	10.5; 24	6.1; 10	1.8; 7	1.8; 8	1.4; 6	1.4; 6	0.8; 2	0.4; 1	0.2; 1	0.1; 0	4.2; 5	3.9; 1	0.6
Sigma Dos/El Mundo	12–18 Jul	2,515	?	34.8; 157	29.9; 128	9.0; 21	6.9; 10	1.8; 7	2.0; 8	1.4; 6	1.1; 6	0.7; 2	0.5; 1	0.2; 1	–	3.6; 2	2.9; 1	4.9
EM-Analytics/Electomanía	7–12 Jul	1,431	?	32.6; 145	32.0; 133	10.9; 25	5.7; 10	1.8; 7	1.8; 8	1.5; 7	1.4; 6	0.7; 2	0.3; 0	0.2; 1	0.1; 0	4.1; 5	4.0; 1	0.6
Simple Lógica/elDiario.es	1–10 Jul	1,026	62.8	33.5	31.6	10.5	8.6	–	–	–	–	–	–	–	–	2.7	3.1	1.9
EM-Analytics/Electomanía	29 Jun–5 Jul	2,104	?	32.0; 145	31.4; 132	11.1; 26	5.6; 9	1.8; 7	1.8; 8	1.5; 7	1.3; 6	0.8; 2	0.4; 1	0.2; 1	0.1; 0	4.0; 5	4.2; 1	0.6
CIS (JM)	1–4 Jul	4,007	69.8	32.2; 139	30.9; 129	13.8; 42	7.0; 10	–	–	–	–	–	–	–	–	4.1; 3	2.5; 1	1.3
CIS	1–4 Jul	4,007	?	30.2	32.9	12.2	6.6	1.7	1.6	1.2	1.1	0.6	0.3	0.1	–	4.0	2.7	2.7
Hamalgama Métrica/Vozpópuli	1–4 Jul	1,000	?	34.6; 151	29.9; 126	11.3; 28	5.9; 9	1.6; 7	1.9; 8	1.4; 6	1.3; 5	0.8; 2	0.4; 1	0.2; 1	–	3.8; 3	3.7; 3	4.7
EM-Analytics/Electomanía	22–28 Jun	2,401	?	32.5; 147	31.5; 131	11.3; 26	5.7; 9	1.7; 7	1.8; 8	1.5; 7	1.4; 6	0.7; 2	0.3; 0	0.2; 1	0.1; 0	3.6; 5	4.1; 1	1.0
Sigma Dos/El Mundo	21–28 Jun	1,974	?	33.8; 148	30.0; 131	10.9; 27	6.6; 10	1.7; 7	1.9; 8	1.4; 6	1.1; 5	0.7; 2	0.5; 1	0.2; 1	–	3.4; 3	2.7; 1	3.8
Target Point/El Debate	25–27 Jun	1,002	?	34.9; 149/150	29.6; 119/120	9.8; 23/24	5.5; 7/9	–	–	–	–	–	–	–	–	4.4; 4/6	3.8; 3/4	5.3
40dB/Prisa	21–24 Jun	2,000	?	33.3	31.2	10.4	5.9	–	–	–	–	–	–	–	–	3.0	4.4	2.1
KeyData/Público	22 Jun	?	70.2	34.2; 147	29.9; 121	11.8; 32	8.0; 15	1.6; 7	1.8; 8	1.6; 6	1.1; 6	0.7; 2	? 1	? 1	–	3.0; 1	3.3; 3	4.3
EM-Analytics/Electomanía	15–21 Jun	1,741	?	32.1; 144	31.9; 133	11.5; 26	5.4; 9	1.8; 7	1.7; 8	1.5; 6	1.4; 6	0.7; 2	0.1; 0	0.1; 1	0.1; 0	3.7; 5	4.5; 2	0.2
NC Report/La Razón	11–15 Jun	1,000	65.2	34.4; 153/155	29.8; 120/122	10.3; 28/29	6.3; 9/10	1.8; 7	1.9; 8/9	1.7; 7	1.2; 5	1.1; 2	0.4; 1	0.2; 1	–	3.5; 2	4.3; 5/6	4.6
EM-Analytics/Electomanía	10–14 Jun	1,913	?	34.8; 146	32.0; 131	12.4; 33	5.7; 5	1.6; 7	2.0; 8	1.5; 6	1.4; 6	0.9; 2	0.3; 1	0.2; 1	0.1; 0	4.0; 4	–	2.8
EM-Analytics/Electomanía	10–14 Jun	1,913	?	32.3; 143	31.2; 130	11.5; 27	5.3; 8	1.6; 6	1.9; 8	1.4; 7	1.3; 6	0.8; 2	0.2; 0	0.1; 0	0.1; 0	3.6; 5	5.8; 7	1.1
InvyMark/laSexta	10–14 Jun	?	?	38.5	31.7	11.1	8.4	–	–	–	–	–	–	–	–	(Note: Within Sumar.)	–	6.8
Simple Lógica/elDiario.es	1–11 Jun	1,032	60.7	33.8	30.1	11.5	9.0	–	–	–	–	–	–	–	–	3.6	–	3.7
2024 EP election	9 Jun	—N/a	46.4	34.2 (152)	30.2 (131)	9.6 (22)	4.7 (4)	2.1 (8)	2.5 (12)	1.6 (7)	1.1 (4)	1.0 (2)	0.4 (1)	–	–	3.3 (2)	4.6 (5)	4.0
CIS (SocioMétrica)	31 May–6 Jun	4,011	?	32.3	29.2	13.7	8.4	2.8	1.9	1.0	0.9	0.9	1.1	0.1	–	3.5	1.2	3.1
CIS (Logoslab)	31 May–6 Jun	4,011	?	32.9; 141	30.0; 124	12.7; 39	8.6; 15	–	–	–	–	–	–	–	–	3.8; 3	1.4; 0	2.9
CIS	31 May–6 Jun	4,011	?	30.7	31.7	12.1	8.8	1.8	1.6	1.1	0.9	0.9	0.5	0.1	–	3.6	1.5	1.0
GESOP/Prensa Ibérica	27–31 May	1,013	?	32.8; 142/144	29.5; 120/122	12.5; 35/37	9.5; 19/21	1.7; 7/8	1.6; 7/8	–	–	–	–	–	–	2.6; 0	–	3.3
EM-Analytics/Electomanía	25–31 May	3,109	?	35.2; 151	33.6; 134	10.6; 24	7.0; 9	1.6; 6	1.9; 8	1.4; 6	1.3; 6	0.7; 2	0.3; 1	0.2; 1	0.1; 0	3.2; 2	–	1.6
40dB/Prisa	28–30 May	2,000	?	33.8	30.7	13.1	7.2	–	–	–	–	–	–	–	–	3.4	–	3.1
Sondaxe/La Voz de Galicia	23–29 May	1,005	?	33.9; 141	29.2; 120	12.8; 40	8.2; 16	1.6; 7	1.6; 7	1.7; 7	1.1; 6	1.0; 2	0.5; 1	0.2; 1	–	3.6; 2	–	4.7
EM-Analytics/Electomanía	18–24 May	1,804	?	35.8; 152	33.3; 135	10.5; 24	6.7; 9	1.5; 6	1.8; 8	1.4; 6	1.3; 6	0.7; 1	0.2; 0	0.2; 1	0.1; 0	2.9; 2	–	2.5
SocioMétrica/El Español	17–19 May	519	?	37.1; 160	29.6; 117	11.5; 28	8.2; 14	1.4; 6	2.0; 9	1.8; 9	1.0; 4	0.9; 2	0.3; 1	0.1; 0	–	2.7; 0	–	7.5
KeyData/Público	18 May	?	70.8	36.6; 160	29.1; 116	11.2; 26	8.7; 17	1.6; 7	1.8; 8	1.6; 6	1.0; 6	0.6; 2	? 1	? 1	–	2.0; 0	–	7.5
EM-Analytics/Electomanía	12–17 May	1,312	?	36.0; 154	33.2; 133	10.0; 23	6.5; 9	1.5; 6	1.9; 8	1.4; 6	1.3; 6	0.7; 1	0.3; 1	0.2; 1	0.1; 0	2.8; 2	–	2.8
40dB/Prisa	10–13 May	2,000	?	34.5	30.9	13.4	7.2	–	–	–	–	–	–	–	–	2.6	–	3.6
Simple Lógica/elDiario.es	1–9 May	1,131	58.3	34.4	29.9	12.4	9.5	–	–	–	–	–	–	–	–	1.6	–	4.5
CIS (Logoslab)	3–8 May	4,013	?	34.7; 145	30.5; 124	12.3; 33	8.6; 15	–	–	–	–	–	–	–	–	2.5; 1	–	4.2
CIS	3–8 May	4,013	?	30.4	35.5	10.2	8.0	1.1	1.5	1.3	0.8	0.6	0.2	0.1	–	2.2	–	5.1
SocioMétrica/El Español	30 Apr–4 May	1,279	?	39.4; 168	27.6; 108	11.1; 25	8.0; 17	1.6; 6	2.1; 9	2.0; 10	0.9; 4	0.9; 2	0.4; 1	0.1; 0	–	2.6; 0	–	11.8
EM-Analytics/Electomanía	28 Apr–4 May	1,705	?	36.2; 154	32.9; 133	9.6; 21	7.8; 11	1.6; 6	1.8; 8	1.5; 6	1.4; 6	0.7; 1	0.3; 1	0.2; 1	0.0; 0	2.7; 2	–	3.3
CIS	26 Apr	1,809	?	29.2	38.6	11.0	7.2	1.2	1.4	0.6	0.5	0.9	0.2	–	–	2.6	–	9.4
EM-Analytics/Electomanía	24–26 Apr	2,304	?	35.9; 151	32.6; 131	10.1; 23	8.1; 13	1.7; 7	1.9; 8	1.4; 6	1.4; 6	0.7; 1	0.3; 1	0.2; 1	0.0; 0	2.6; 2	–	3.3
EM-Analytics/Electomanía	16–23 Apr	2,230	?	36.5; 159	31.2; 118	9.7; 22	8.6; 16	2.0; 7	2.0; 8	1.4; 7	1.4; 6	0.8; 2	0.3; 1	0.2; 1	0.0; 0	2.5; 2	–	5.3
KeyData/Público	13 Apr	?	70.7	37.4; 160	29.2; 114	10.7; 25	9.4; 19	1.7; 8	1.7; 7	1.4; 6	1.1; 6	0.7; 2	? 1	? 1	–	2.5; 1	–	8.2
SocioMétrica/El Español	9–12 Apr	2,550	?	39.1; 162	27.0; 107	11.3; 27	8.4; 22	1.5; 6	2.3; 9	2.0; 9	1.1; 4	0.8; 2	0.4; 1	0.1; 1	–	2.5; 0	–	12.1
EM-Analytics/Electomanía	6–12 Apr	1,483	?	36.7; 159	29.9; 118	10.3; 22	8.9; 16	1.9; 7	2.0; 8	1.5; 7	1.4; 6	0.9; 2	0.3; 1	0.2; 1	0.0; 0	2.9; 2	–	6.8
Simple Lógica/elDiario.es	1–9 Apr	1,042	64.2	35.7	30.5	11.7	10.4	–	–	–	–	–	–	–	–	1.5	–	5.2
EM-Analytics/Electomanía	30 Mar–5 Apr	1,483	?	36.9; 158	29.5; 118	10.8; 24	8.5; 15	1.9; 7	2.0; 8	1.5; 7	1.4; 6	0.8; 2	0.3; 1	0.2; 1	0.0; 0	3.1; 2	–	7.4
CIS (SocioMétrica)	1–4 Apr	4,032	?	38.6; 155	29.5; 117	11.5; 29	8.1; 20	1.3; 5	1.7; 7	1.3; 6	0.9; 5	0.9; 1	0.5; 0	0.1; 0	–	2.6; 3	–	9.1
CIS	1–4 Apr	4,032	?	33.5	32.5	10.1	8.2	1.4	1.4	0.9	1.0	0.8	0.2	0.1	–	3.1	–	1.0
EM-Analytics/Electomanía	23–29 Mar	1,301	?	36.5; 157	29.2; 116	11.3; 26	9.0; 16	1.8; 7	1.9; 8	1.5; 7	1.4; 6	0.8; 2	0.3; 1	0.2; 1	0.0; 0	2.9; 2	–	7.3
40dB/Prisa	25–27 Mar	2,000	?	35.5	30.0	11.3	8.2	–	–	–	–	–	–	–	–	2.9	–	5.5
NC Report/La Razón	20–27 Mar	1,000	65.2	38.4; 162/164	28.4; 113/115	10.8; 24/26	9.3; 18/20	1.7; 7	1.8; 7	1.4; 6	1.1; 5	0.8; 2	0.5; 1	0.2; 1	–		–	10.0
Sigma Dos/El Mundo	19–26 Mar	1,413	?	38.2; 164	29.8; 118	9.4; 18	9.8; 20	1.9; 7	1.6; 7	1.0; 5	1.1; 6	0.7; 2	0.5; 1	0.2; 1	–	2.5; 1	–	8.4
InvyMark/laSexta	18–22 Mar	?	?	38.6	30.9	9.6	9.4	–	–	–	–	–	–	–	–		–	7.7
EM-Analytics/Electomanía	16–22 Mar	1,724	?	36.1; 152	28.9; 114	11.7; 30	9.6; 19	1.7; 7	2.0; 8	1.5; 7	1.4; 6	0.8; 2	0.3; 1	0.2; 1	0.0; 0	2.7; 2	–	7.2
GAD3/Mediaset	18–21 Mar	1,017	?	37.3; 157/163	27.6; 106/112	11.7; 28/32	8.7; 13/17	–	–	–	–	–	–	–	–	3.1; 2	–	9.7
Hamalgama Métrica/Vozpópuli	18–21 Mar	1,000	?	38.7; 161	27.8; 109	11.2; 27	9.6; 22	1.6; 7	1.8; 8	1.6; 7	1.4; 5	0.8; 2	0.4; 1	0.2; 1	–		–	10.9
KeyData/Público	16 Mar	?	70.5	38.0; 160	28.5; 112	10.7; 25	9.9; 22	1.8; 8	1.7; 7	1.4; 6	1.1; 6	0.6; 1	? 1	? 1	–	2.2; 1	–	9.5
EM-Analytics/Electomanía	9–15 Mar	1,517	?	36.4; 155	28.5; 115	11.5; 28	9.6; 18	1.6; 7	2.1; 8	1.6; 7	1.5; 6	0.8; 2	0.3; 1	0.2; 1	0.0; 0	2.8; 2	–	7.9
Sigma Dos/Antena 3	5–15 Mar	2,405	?	? 164/165	? 116/117	? 19/20	? 18/19	? 7/8	? 7/8	? 5/6	? 5/6	–	–	–	–	? 1/2	–	?
SocioMétrica/El Español	5–9 Mar	2,900	?	40.0; 159	28.2; 110	10.5; 26	10.1; 24	1.2; 5	2.2; 10	2.0; 8	1.0; 5	0.7; 1	0.2; 1	0.1; 1	–		–	11.8
EM-Analytics/Electomanía	2–8 Mar	1,327	?	37.2; 158	27.9; 109	11.6; 30	9.5; 18	2.0; 7	2.0; 8	1.5; 7	1.4; 6	0.8; 2	0.3; 1	0.2; 1	0.0; 0	2.4; 2	–	9.3
Simple Lógica/elDiario.es	1–8 Mar	1,046	64.0	36.1	29.8	10.8	11.6	–	–	–	–	–	–	–	–	2.0	–	6.3
Target Point/El Debate	5–7 Mar	1,080	?	38.8; 159/161	26.9; 103/105	10.7; 25/27	10.8; 24/26	–	–	–	–	–	–	–	–		–	11.9
Celeste-Tel/Onda Cero	1–6 Mar	1,100	65.8	38.5; 163	28.8; 112	10.5; 24	10.4; 22	1.8; 7	1.7; 7	1.5; 6	1.3; 6	0.7; 1	0.5; 1	0.2; 1	–	1.7; 0	–	9.7
CIS (Logoslab)	1–5 Mar	3,931	?	37.7; 159	29.1; 117	11.2; 27	8.6; 15	–	–	–	–	–	–	–	–	2.3; 1	–	8.6
CIS	1–5 Mar	3,931	?	34.0	31.3	9.9	9.2	1.9	1.2	1.1	0.9	0.9	0.2	0.1	–	2.2	–	2.7
40dB/Prisa	1–3 Mar	2,000	?	35.2	30.7	10.6	11.7	–	–	–	–	–	–	–	–		–	4.5
EM-Analytics/Electomanía	24 Feb–1 Mar	1,327	?	36.8; 158	28.7; 114	11.3; 26	9.6; 18	2.0; 8	2.0; 8	1.6; 7	1.5; 6	0.8; 2	0.3; 1	0.2; 1	0.0; 0	2.0; 0	–	8.1
GAD3/ABC	26–29 Feb	1,005	?	37.9; 159/165	28.4; 110/116	11.1; 24/28	8.8; 14/18	2.0; 7	1.7; 7	1.5; 7	1.1; 6	0.9; 2	0.4; 1	0.2; 1	–	2.4; 2	–	9.5
Sigma Dos/El Mundo	22–29 Feb	1,632	?	37.9; 163	29.3; 115	10.2; 21	9.4; 19	1.9; 8	1.7; 7	1.0; 5	1.1; 6	0.7; 2	0.5; 1	0.2; 1	–	2.8; 2	–	8.6
KeyData/Público	24 Feb	?	69.0	36.8; 153	30.2; 118	11.0; 25	10.3; 24	1.7; 8	1.6; 7	1.4; 6	1.1; 6	0.6; 1	? 1	? 1	–	2.4; 0	–	6.6
EM-Analytics/Electomanía	17–23 Feb	1,778	?	36.3; 158	29.9; 118	10.8; 25	9.1; 16	2.0; 8	2.0; 8	1.6; 7	1.5; 6	0.9; 2	0.2; 0	0.2; 1	0.0; 0	2.1; 0	–	6.4
Hamalgama Métrica/Vozpópuli	19–22 Feb	1,000	?	38.8; 157	28.2; 110	11.6; 30	9.9; 25	1.7; 7	1.7; 7	1.4; 6	1.2; 5	0.7; 1	0.4; 1	0.2; 1	–		–	10.6
GESOP/Prensa Ibérica	19–21 Feb	1,004	?	38.5; 166/171	28.0; 108/113	9.1; 18/22	10.2; 23/27	1.8; 7/8	1.6; 7/8	–	–	–	–	–	–	1.8; 0	–	10.5
EM-Analytics/Electomanía	10–16 Feb	1,526	?	34.5; 150	31.4; 126	10.6; 22	9.9; 21	2.0; 7	1.9; 8	1.6; 7	1.5; 6	0.9; 2	0.1; 0	0.2; 1	0.0; 0	2.0; 0	–	3.1
SocioMétrica/El Español	5–9 Feb	2,900	?	38.5; 153	29.0; 115	10.8; 27	10.5; 25	1.0; 5	2.0; 9	1.8; 8	1.1; 5	0.7; 1	0.2; 1	0.1; 1	–		–	9.5
EM-Analytics/Electomanía	3–9 Feb	1,708	?	34.9; 150	31.6; 126	10.0; 22	9.8; 21	2.0; 7	1.9; 8	1.6; 7	1.5; 6	0.8; 2	0.2; 0	0.2; 1	0.0; 0	1.9; 0	–	3.3
Simple Lógica/elDiario.es	1–9 Feb	1,018	64.9	36.6	29.7	12.0	11.1	–	–	–	–	–	–	–	–	2.3	–	6.9
CIS	1–6 Feb	3,926	?	33.2	33.0	7.9	10.2	2.1	1.0	0.8	1.0	0.7	0.1	0.1	–	2.9	–	0.2
EM-Analytics/Electomanía	27 Jan–2 Feb	1,614	?	35.7; 152	30.9; 125	9.5; 21	9.9; 21	2.0; 7	1.9; 8	1.6; 7	1.5; 6	0.8; 2	0.2; 0	0.2; 1	0.0; 0	2.1; 0	–	4.8
Sigma Dos/El Mundo	26 Jan–1 Feb	1,632	?	36.8; 153	30.2; 122	10.5; 23	9.6; 20	2.0; 8	1.6; 7	1.1; 5	1.1; 6	0.7; 2	0.5; 1	0.2; 1	–	2.6; 2	–	6.6
40dB/Prisa	26–29 Jan	2,000	?	34.4	30.5	11.8	10.9	–	–	–	–	–	–	–	–		–	3.9
EM-Analytics/Electomanía	19–26 Jan	2,413	?	35.0; 151	31.3; 125	9.6; 21	10.1; 21	2.0; 7	2.0; 8	1.7; 7	1.6; 6	0.8; 2	0.2; 1	0.2; 1	0.0; 0	1.9; 0	–	3.7
InvyMark/laSexta	15–19 Jan	?	?	37.5	32.3	9.8	9.6	–	–	–	–	–	–	–	–		–	5.2
EM-Analytics/Electomanía	12–19 Jan	1,651	?	34.5; 150	31.6; 125	9.9; 22	10.2; 22	1.9; 7	2.0; 8	1.7; 7	1.6; 6	0.9; 2	0.1; 0	0.2; 1	0.0; 0	1.9; 0	–	2.9
KeyData/Público	18 Jan	?	?	36.8; 153	30.1; 116	11.0; 26	10.6; 25	? 7	? 8	? 6	? 6	? 1	? 1	? 1	–	2.0; 0	–	6.7
EM-Analytics/Electomanía	6–12 Jan	1,249	?	35.3; 151	31.4; 125	9.7; 20	10.3; 23	1.9; 7	2.0; 8	1.7; 7	1.6; 6	0.8; 2	0.1; 0	0.2; 1	0.0; 0	1.5; 0	–	3.9
Simple Lógica/elDiario.es	2–9 Jan	1,013	62.1	36.6	29.4	11.4	10.7	–	–	–	–	–	–	–	–	2.4	–	7.2
40dB/Prisa	5–8 Jan	2,000	?	34.7	31.4	10.9	11.0	–	–	–	–	–	–	–	–		–	3.3
CIS (Logoslab)	2–5 Jan	4,016	68.3	36.0; 154	30.6; 123	11.0; 27	9.3; 17	1.6; 7	1.4; 7	1.2; 6	1.1; 6	0.6; 1	0.3; 1	0.1; 0	–	2.5; 1	–	5.4
CIS (Jaime Miquel)	2–5 Jan	4,016	68.3	36.3; 155	30.0; 121	11.1; 26	9.5; 18	1.8; 7	1.5; 6	1.1; 6	1.2; 6	0.9; 2	0.4; 1	0.2; 1	–	2.7; 1	–	6.3
CIS (SocioMétrica)	2–5 Jan	4,016	?	37.6	30.3	12.0	8.2	1.4	1.7	1.0	0.9	0.8	0.3	0.0	–	3.0	–	7.3
CIS	2–5 Jan	4,016	?	32.1	34.0	8.3	9.7	1.4	1.5	0.9	0.8	0.7	0.2	0.1	–	2.7	–	1.9
EM-Analytics/Electomanía	29 Dec–5 Jan	1,132	?	35.0; 151	32.0; 129	9.5; 21	9.4; 16	1.9; 7	2.0; 8	1.7; 7	1.6; 6	0.9; 2	0.1; 0	0.2; 1	0.0; 0	2.4; 2	–	3.0

=== 2023 ===
Polling firm/Commissioner	Fieldwork date	Sample size	Turnout	PP	PSOE	Vox	Sumar	ERC	Junts	EH Bildu	PNV	BNG	CCa	UPN	Adelante Andalucía (2021)	Podemos	Lead
KeyData/Público	31 Dec	?	68.5	36.4; 151	30.2; 116	11.3; 28	10.9; 27	1.8; 7	1.8; 7	1.4; 6	1.1; 5	0.6; 1	? 1	? 1	–		6.2
SocioMétrica/El Español	25–31 Dec	2,309	?	38.7; 154	29.2; 115	11.0; 28	10.8; 25	1.1; 5	1.8; 8	1.7; 7	1.0; 5	0.5; 1	0.2; 1	0.2; 1	–		9.5
EM-Analytics/Electomanía	23–29 Dec	1,007	?	35.5; 153	31.6; 129	9.7; 21	9.4; 16	1.9; 7	2.0; 8	1.7; 7	1.6; 6	0.9; 2	0.1; 0	0.2; 1	0.0; 0	2.2; 0	3.9
Celeste-Tel/Onda Cero	21–27 Dec	1,100	65.5	37.0; 152	30.3; 119	10.8; 26	10.1; 22	1.9; 8	1.8; 8	1.5; 6	1.1; 6	0.7; 1	0.4; 1	0.2; 1	–	1.1; 0	6.7
Sigma Dos/El Mundo	15–26 Dec	2,992	?	37.2; 152	29.8; 114	11.2; 23	11.8; 30	2.0; 8	1.6; 7	1.1; 6	1.1; 5	0.6; 2	0.5; 1	0.2; 1	–		7.4
EM-Analytics/Electomanía	16–22 Dec	1,093	?	35.1; 150	31.4; 125	10.3; 22	10.2; 22	1.9; 7	2.0; 8	1.7; 7	1.6; 6	0.8; 2	0.1; 0	0.2; 1	0.0; 0	2.1; 0	3.7
NC Report/La Razón	12–16 Dec	1,000	64.8	37.1; 152/154	30.1; 117/120	11.0; 24/26	10.9; 25/27	1.7; 7	1.8; 7	1.3; 6	1.1; 5	0.6; 1	0.4; 1	0.2; 1	–		7.0
DYM/Henneo	13–15 Dec	1,011	?	37.1; 152/156	29.9; 112/116	11.0; 27/31	8.8; 20/23	–	–	–	–	–	–	–	–	2.3; 2/3	7.2
InvyMark/laSexta	11–15 Dec	?	?	36.1	33.2	10.0	9.8	–	–	–	–	–	–	–	–		2.9
EM-Analytics/Electomanía	9–15 Dec	1,180	?	34.9; 150	31.3; 125	10.6; 22	9.9; 22	1.9; 7	2.0; 8	1.7; 7	1.6; 6	0.8; 2	0.1; 0	0.2; 1	0.0; 0	2.2; 0	3.6
Simple Lógica/elDiario.es	1–11 Dec	1,003	71.6	35.5	29.6	12.3	12.0	–	–	–	–	–	–	–	–		5.9
EM-Analytics/Electomanía	6–8 Dec	1,250	?	35.4; 151	31.2; 125	10.5; 22	9.4; 19	1.9; 7	1.9; 8	1.6; 7	1.5; 6	0.8; 2	0.2; 0	0.2; 1	0.0; 0	2.6; 2	4.2
CIS (Logoslab)	1–7 Dec	4,613	?	37.0; 153	29.0; 111	10.8; 24	12.3; 34	–	–	–	–	–	–	–	–		8.0
CIS	1–7 Dec	4,613	?	33.2	31.8	8.5	11.8	1.9	1.3	1.1	0.9	0.8	0.2	0.1	–		1.4
EM-Analytics/Electomanía	24 Nov–2 Dec	1,233	?	34.9; 146	31.7; 121	11.2; 28	11.3; 24	1.9; 7	2.0; 8	1.7; 7	1.6; 6	0.9; 2	0.2; 0	0.2; 1	0.1; 0		3.2
Sigma Dos/El Mundo	27 Nov–1 Dec	1,784	?	37.4; 153	30.5; 118	11.4; 25	11.1; 27	2.1; 7	1.4; 6	1.1; 6	1.1; 5	0.6; 1	0.5; 1	0.2; 1	–		6.9
40dB/Prisa	24–27 Nov	2,000	?	35.0; 139/150	30.5; 112/127	11.5; 24/34	11.3; 24/32	? 7	? 8	? 6	? 5	? 1	? 1	? 1	–		4.5
Sigma Dos/Antena 3	17–27 Nov	1,654	?	37.3; 150/152	? 115/117	11.4; 24/26	11.3; 28/30	2.1; 8/9	1.4; 6	? 6	? 5	–	–	–	–		?
KeyData/Público	25 Nov	?	67.5	36.2; 149	30.8; 118	11.3; 27	11.4; 27	1.7; 7	1.8; 8	1.4; 6	1.1; 5	0.6; 1	? 1	? 1	–		5.4
SocioMétrica/El Español	20–24 Nov	2,109	?	38.7; 155	30.1; 117	10.6; 26	10.2; 24	1.1; 5	2.1; 9	1.7; 7	0.8; 4	0.5; 1	0.3; 1	0.3; 1	–		8.6
GESOP/Prensa Ibérica	21–23 Nov	1,002	?	35.2; 145/150	27.3; 105/110	12.5; 30/35	12.5; 30/35	2.0; 7/8	2.0; 7/8	–	–	–	–	–	–		7.9
EM-Analytics/Electomanía	18–23 Nov	1,524	?	34.4; 148	31.8; 125	10.8; 24	11.2; 25	1.8; 6	1.9; 8	1.6; 6	1.5; 6	0.7; 1	0.1; 0	0.2; 1	0.2; 0		2.6
Hamalgama Métrica/Vozpópuli	17–23 Nov	1,000	?	36.2; 151	30.7; 113	11.8; 30	11.0; 27	1.9; 8	1.7; 7	1.4; 6	1.2; 5	0.6; 1	0.4; 1	0.2; 1	–		5.5
DYM/Henneo	17–18 Nov	1,004	?	36.9; 149/155	29.0; 108/112	11.1; 28/32	11.1; 26/30	–	–	–	–	–	–	–	–		7.9
GAD3/Mediaset	16–17 Nov	1,008	?	36.3; 147/153	28.8; 108/114	11.6; 27/31	11.7; 26/30	–	–	–	–	–	–	–	–		7.5
EM-Analytics/Electomanía	13–17 Nov	1,419	?	34.5; 145	31.1; 117	11.5; 28	12.0; 30	1.9; 7	1.9; 8	1.7; 7	1.6; 6	0.7; 1	0.2; 0	0.2; 1	0.1; 0		3.4
InvyMark/laSexta	13–17 Nov	?	?	36.0	32.9	9.7	9.9	–	–	–	–	–	–	–	–		3.1
Simple Lógica/elDiario.es	2–13 Nov	1,021	72.3	35.9	30.3	11.6	11.7	–	–	–	–	–	–	–	–		5.6
Celeste-Tel/Onda Cero	6–10 Nov	1,100	66.0	36.5; 151	30.6; 118	10.9; 26	11.3; 25	2.0; 8	1.9; 8	1.5; 6	1.1; 6	0.7; 1	0.3; 0	0.2; 1	–		5.9
EM-Analytics/Electomanía	4–10 Nov	2,549	?	35.0; 147	31.1; 117	11.6; 29	11.6; 27	1.8; 7	1.8; 8	1.7; 7	1.6; 6	0.7; 1	0.2; 0	0.2; 1	0.1; 0		3.9
CIS	31 Oct–6 Nov	4,090	?	33.9	31.3	10.0	11.8	1.9	1.4	1.3	0.9	0.7	0.4	0.1	–		2.6
NC Report/La Razón	31 Oct–4 Nov	1,000	65.0	35.8; 146/149	31.0; 119/122	11.2; 27/29	11.0; 25/27	1.8; 7	1.8; 8	1.4; 6	1.0; 5	0.6; 1	–	0.2; 1	–		4.8
InvyMark/laSexta	30 Oct–3 Nov	?	?	37.2	31.1	9.5	9.9	–	–	–	–	–	–	–	–		6.1
Sigma Dos/El Mundo	30 Oct–3 Nov	1,788	?	36.7; 151	31.2; 123	10.9; 22	11.2; 27	1.9; 7	1.5; 6	1.2; 6	1.1; 5	0.6; 1	0.5; 1	0.2; 1	–		5.5
GAD3/ABC	30 Oct–3 Nov	1,001	?	35.5; 146	29.7; 116	11.6; 28	12.0; 30	1.8; 7	2.0; 8	1.4; 6	1.1; 5	0.7; 2	? 1	? 1	–		5.8
EM-Analytics/Electomanía	27 Oct–3 Nov	1,156	?	34.4; 145	31.7; 119	11.4; 28	11.6; 27	1.9; 7	2.0; 8	1.8; 7	1.6; 6	0.9; 2	0.2; 0	0.2; 1	0.0; 0		2.7
40dB/Prisa	27–30 Oct	2,000	?	34.7; 138/151	31.2; 114/128	11.2; 22/33	11.7; 24/33	? 7	? 8	? 6	? 5	? 1	? 1	? 1	–		3.5
SocioMétrica/El Español	25–27 Oct	2,600	?	37.8; 153	30.2; 117	11.0; 26	11.0; 25	1.1; 5	2.1; 9	1.6; 7	1.0; 5	0.6; 1	0.3; 1	0.3; 1	–		7.6
EM-Analytics/Electomanía	20–27 Oct	1,462	?	34.2; 143	32.1; 121	11.2; 27	11.8; 27	1.8; 7	1.9; 8	1.7; 7	1.6; 6	0.9; 2	0.2; 0	0.2; 1	0.0; 0		2.1
Hamalgama Métrica/Vozpópuli	20–26 Oct	1,000	?	35.6; 146	31.3; 117	12.1; 32	11.2; 27	1.7; 7	1.7; 7	1.3; 6	1.1; 5	0.7; 1	0.4; 1	0.2; 1	–		4.3
DYM/Henneo	18–22 Oct	1,035	?	34.9; 142/146	32.6; 122/126	12.4; 30/34	10.3; 23/27	–	–	–	–	–	–	–	–		2.3
InvyMark/laSexta	16–20 Oct	?	?	34.7	32.6	10.1	10.2	–	–	–	–	–	–	–	–		2.1
EM-Analytics/Electomanía	13–20 Oct	1,410	?	33.8; 143	32.2; 122	10.5; 21	12.5; 32	1.8; 7	1.9; 8	1.8; 7	1.7; 6	0.9; 2	0.2; 0	0.2; 1	0.0; 0		1.6
EM-Analytics/Electomanía	7–13 Oct	1,145	?	33.4; 141	32.1; 122	10.4; 21	13.2; 34	1.9; 7	1.9; 8	1.8; 7	1.6; 6	0.8; 2	0.1; 0	0.2; 1	0.0; 0		1.3
Sigma Dos/Antena 3	4–11 Oct	1,440	?	? 144/146	? 117/119	? 26/27	? 29/31	? 8/9	? 6/7	? 6	? 5	–	–	–	–		?
Simple Lógica/elDiario.es	2–10 Oct	1,010	69.4	34.1	32.3	10.7	12.0	–	–	–	–	–	–	–	–		1.8
EM-Analytics/Electomanía	1–7 Oct	1,226	?	32.6; 137	32.1; 121	10.5; 24	13.7; 36	1.9; 7	1.9; 8	1.8; 7	1.6; 6	0.8; 2	0.2; 0	0.2; 1	0.0; 0		0.5
CIS	2–6 Oct	4,031	?	32.2	32.6	10.1	12.7	1.9	1.3	0.9	0.8	0.8	0.1	0.1	–		0.4
KeyData/Público	5 Oct	?	66.0	34.9; 143	31.8; 122	11.7; 29	11.6; 28	1.7; 7	1.8; 7	1.4; 6	1.0; 5	0.7; 1	? 1	? 1	–		3.1
Target Point/El Debate	2–4 Oct	1,003	?	34.5; 141/143	30.8; 117/119	11.9; 30/32	11.8; 28/30	–	–	–	–	–	–	–	–		3.7
40dB/Prisa	29 Sep–2 Oct	2,000	?	34.2; 134/147	32.1; 117/128	11.7; 27/34	11.1; 23/29	? 7	? 8	? 6	? 5	? 1	? 1	? 1	–		2.1
EM-Analytics/Electomanía	23–29 Sep	1,132	?	31.9; 133	32.1; 122	10.8; 26	14.1; 37	1.9; 7	1.9; 8	1.8; 7	1.6; 6	0.8; 2	0.3; 0	0.2; 1	0.0; 0		0.2
Sigma Dos/El Mundo	25–28 Sep	2,120	?	36.1; 147	30.8; 118	11.3; 26	12.5; 32	1.8; 7	1.6; 6	1.2; 6	1.0; 5	0.6; 1	0.5; 1	0.2; 1	–		5.3
SocioMétrica/El Español	21–23 Sep	1,429	?	37.0; 149	30.9; 119	11.6; 28	10.8; 26	1.4; 6	1.9; 8	1.5; 6	0.9; 5	0.6; 1	0.4; 1	0.3; 1	–		6.1
EM-Analytics/Electomanía	16–22 Sep	1,002	?	31.9; 132	32.3; 124	11.0; 26	14.1; 38	1.8; 6	1.8; 8	1.7; 6	1.6; 6	0.8; 2	0.3; 0	0.2; 1	0.0; 0		0.4
Hamalgama Métrica/Vozpópuli	15–21 Sep	1,000	?	35.4; 145	30.9; 118	11.9; 32	11.5; 28	1.6; 6	1.7; 7	1.4; 6	1.0; 5	0.7; 1	0.4; 1	0.2; 1	–		4.5
DYM/Henneo	14–17 Sep	1,003	?	34.1; 138/144	32.3; 120/126	12.1; 30/34	10.9; 25/29	–	–	–	–	–	–	–	–		1.8
EM-Analytics/Electomanía	9–15 Sep	1,421	?	32.1; 134	32.5; 124	11.1; 26	14.0; 38	1.6; 6	1.7; 7	1.6; 5	1.5; 6	0.8; 2	0.3; 0	0.2; 1	0.0; 0		0.4
CIS	1–12 Sep	10,104	?	31.7	33.5	11.1	11.9	1.7	1.7	1.3	0.9	0.7	0.3	0.2	–		1.8
EM-Analytics/Electomanía	2–9 Sep	1,215	?	32.5; 132	33.2; 124	11.6; 30	14.0; 36	1.6; 6	1.6; 7	1.6; 5	1.4; 6	0.8; 2	0.3; 0	0.2; 1	0.0; 0		0.7
Simple Lógica/elDiario.es	1–7 Sep	1,032	70.9	33.6	31.8	11.7	12.3	–	–	–	–	–	–	–	–		1.8
NC Report/La Razón	28 Aug–1 Sep	1,000	64.8	35.5; 143/146	31.0; 121/124	11.4; 27/29	11.2; 26/28	1.7; 6/7	1.7; 7	1.4; 6	1.1; 5	–	–	–	–		4.5
EM-Analytics/Electomanía	25 Aug–1 Sep	1,317	?	32.6; 131	33.4; 127	11.6; 30	14.0; 36	1.5; 6	1.5; 5	1.6; 6	1.3; 5	0.8; 2	0.3; 0	0.2; 1	0.0; 0		0.8
40dB/Prisa	25–28 Aug	2,000	?	33.8; 132/149	32.3; 121/131	10.9; 21/33	12.0; 26/34	? 7	? 6	? 6	? 5	? 1	? 1	? 1	–		1.5
EM-Analytics/Electomanía	12–25 Aug	1,928	?	32.7; 132	33.5; 127	11.7; 30	13.9; 36	1.4; 5	1.5; 5	1.5; 6	1.2; 5	0.8; 2	0.3; 0	0.2; 1	0.0; 0		0.8
Sigma Dos/El Mundo	17–24 Aug	1,933	?	34.2; 140	31.7; 119	12.7; 32	12.4; 31	1.8; 7	1.5; 6	1.3; 7	1.0; 4	0.7; 2	0.5; 1	0.2; 1	–		2.5
EM-Analytics/Electomanía	12–18 Aug	1,566	?	32.8; 133	33.6; 128	11.8; 29	13.7; 35	1.4; 5	1.6; 7	1.5; 6	1.2; 5	0.7; 1	0.3; 0	0.2; 1	0.0; 0		0.8
EM-Analytics/Electomanía	5–11 Aug	1,305	?	32.5; 132	33.4; 128	12.1; 29	13.6; 36	1.4; 5	1.6; 7	1.5; 6	1.2; 4	0.7; 1	0.3; 1	0.2; 1	0.0; 0		0.9
Simple Lógica/elDiario.es	31 Jul–7 Aug	1,098	74.7	31.9	31.2	12.9	12.7	–	–	–	–	–	–	–	–		0.7
EM-Analytics/Electomanía	26 Jul–4 Aug	?	?	32.3; 130	33.2; 129	12.3; 31	13.4; 34	1.5; 6	1.7; 7	1.5; 6	1.2; 5	0.5; 0	0.4; 1	0.2; 1	0.0; 0		0.9
EM-Analytics/Electomanía	24–25 Jul	1,517	?	31.8; 129	33.0; 127	12.7; 32	13.1; 34	1.6; 6	1.8; 8	1.4; 6	1.2; 5	0.6; 1	0.5; 1	0.2; 1	0.0; 0		1.2
2023 general election	23 Jul	—N/a	66.6	33.1; 137	31.7; 121	12.4; 33	12.3; 31	1.9; 7	1.7; 7	1.4; 6	1.1; 5	0.6; 1	0.5; 1	0.2; 1	0.0; 0		1.4
