= 14th Cortes Generales =

Spanish parliament meeting (December 2019–May 2023)

←	13th	15th	→

Overview
- Legislative body: Cortes Generales
- Term: 3 December 2019 – 29 May 2023
- Election: 10 November 2019
- Government: Sánchez II
- Website: cortesgenerales.es

Senate
- Members: 265
- President: Pilar Llop (PSOE) (2019–2021); Ander Gil (PSOE) (2021–2023)
- 1st Vice President: Cristina Narbona (PSOE)
- 2nd Vice President: Pío García-Escudero (PP)

Congress of Deputies
- Members: 350
- President: Meritxell Batet (PSOE)
- 1st Vice President: Alfonso Rodríguez (PSOE)
- 2nd Vice President: Ana Pastor (PP)
- 3rd Vice President: Gloria Elizo (UP)
- 4th Vice President: Ignacio Gil (Vox)

The 14th Cortes Generales was a meeting of the Cortes Generales, the national legislature of Spain, with the membership determined primarily by the results of the general election held on 10 November 2019. The Cortes met for the first time on 3 December 2019, and was dissolved prematurely on 29 May 2023 after regional and local elections in which the governing PSOE lost control of six autonomous communities and many local councils.

== Election ==
The 14th Spanish general election under the 1978 Constitution was held on 10 November 2019. It saw the Spanish Socialist Workers' Party (PSOE) remaining the largest party in the Senate, the upper house of the Cortes Generales, as well as the largest party in the Congress of Deputies, the lower house of the Cortes Generales, but falling short of a majority.

Alliance	Senate		Congress of Deputies			
Alliance	Seats	+/−	Votes	%	Seats	+/−
PSOE	93	–30	6,792,199	28.00	120	–3
PP	83	+29	5,047,040	20.81	89	+23
Vox	2	+2	3,656,979	15.08	52	+28
UP–ECP–EC	0	±0	3,119,364	12.86	35	–7
ERC–Sob–ERPV	11	±0	880,734	3.63	13	–2
Cs	0	–4	1,650,318	6.80	10	–47
JxCat–Junts	3	+1	530,225	2.19	8	+1
EAJ/PNV	9	±0	379,002	1.56	6	±0
EH Bildu	1	±0	277,621	1.14	5	+1
Others/blanks	6	+2	1,924,746	7.93	12	+6
Total	208	±0	24,258,228	100.00	350	±0

== History ==
The new Senate met for the first time on 3 December 2019 and after two rounds of voting Pilar Llop (PSOE) was elected as President of the Senate of Spain.

The new congress also met for the first time on 3 December 2019 and after two rounds of voting Meritxell Batet (PSOE) was elected as President of the Congress of Deputies with the support of the Unidos Podemos–En Comú Podem (UP–ECP) and various nationalist and regionalist parties.

=== Government formation ===
On 7 January 2020, Pedro Sánchez was confirmed as prime minister by the Congress of Deputies.

Investiture; Congress of Deputies; Nomination of Pedro Sánchez (PSOE)
Ballot →	5 January 2020	7 January 2020
Required majority →	176 out of 350	Simple
Yes: • PSOE (120); • UP–ECP–GeC (35) (34 on 5 Jan); • PNV (6); • Más País (2); • Compromís (1); • NCa (1); • BNG (1); • ¡TE! (1)	166 / 350	167 / 350
No: • PP (88); • Vox (52); • Cs (10); • JxCat (8); • CUP (2); • UPN (2); • CCa (1); • PRC (1); • FAC (1)	165 / 350	165 / 350
Abstentions: • ERC (13); • EH Bildu (5)	18 / 350	18 / 350
Absentees: • UP–ECP–GeC (1) (on 5 Jan)	1 / 350	0 / 350

=== Dissolution ===
On Monday 29 May 2023, the day after the 2023 regional and local elections in Spain in which the PSOE lost control of the governments of six autonomous communities and many cities and towns across the country, Pedro Sánchez called a press conference and confirmed that the Cortes would be dissolved that afternoon, with a general election called for the 23 June 2023.
