= Mixed Group (disambiguation) =

Mixed Group is a parliamentary group active in both houses of the Italian Parliament, the Chamber of Deputies and the Senate.

Mixed Group may also refer to:

- Mixed Group (Spain), a permanent parliamentary group in Spain
- Mnet Asian Music Award for Best Mixed Group
