= Marta González Vázquez =

Spanish politician (born 1965)

Marta González Vázquez MP
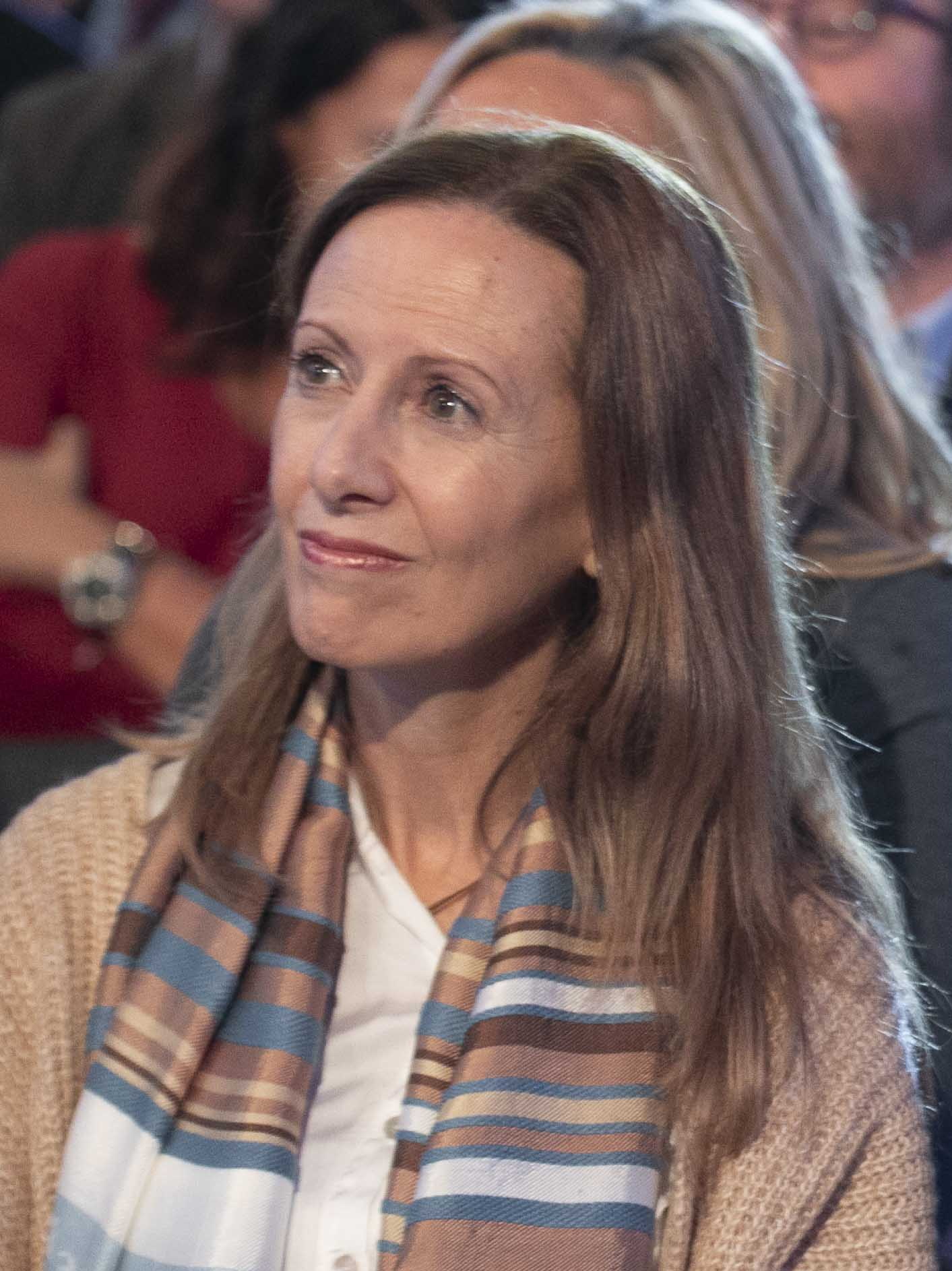

Fourth Vice President of the Congress of Deputies
- Incumbent
- Assumed office 17 August 2023
- President: Francina Armengol
- Preceded by: Ignacio Gil

Deputy spokesperson of People's Party in the Congress of Deputies
- Incumbent
- Assumed office 3 April 2022
- President: Alberto Núñez Feijóo

Member of the Congress of Deputies
- Incumbent
- Assumed office 5 December 2011

Personal details
- Born: 25 January 1965 (age 61) Santiago de Compostela, Spain
- Party: People's Party
- Education: University of Santiago de Compostela
- Occupation: Historian and politician

Marta González Vázquez (Santiago de Compostela, 25 January 1965) is a Spanish historian and politician, member of the Spanish Parliament for La Coruña during the X, XI, XII, XIII, XIV and XV legislatures.

She was deputy secretary general of Communication of the People's Party until July 2019.

== Biography ==
Degree in History from the University of Santiago de Compostela (1987) and PhD from the same university (1994), specializing in Medieval History. In 1992 she began working as a documentalist for the Sargadelos Group of Companies until 1996, when she began teaching medieval history at the University of La Coruña. In 1998 she took up a post as executive secretary of the Compostela Group of Universities, where she remained until 2003, when she joined the Galician Regional Government as Director General of the Galician Equality Service. After the 2005 elections she returned to the private sector as a consultant and after the 2009 elections she returned to the Galician Regional Government as Secretary General of the Galician Equality Service.

In 2011 she left that position to join the lists of the People's Party in the elections to the Congress of Deputies, being elected deputy for La Coruña. That year she also formed part of the People's Party candidacy for the City Council of Santiago de Compostela, being between 2014 and 2015 councilor. Both in 2015 and 2016 she was again elected deputy for La Coruña.

On 27 July 2018 she joined the new PP executive, led by Pablo Casado, as deputy secretary general of Communication. A year later she was replaced by Pablo Montesinos.
