= 13th Cortes Generales =

←	12th	14th	→

Overview
- Legislative body: Cortes Generales
- Term: 21 May 2019 – 24 September 2019
- Election: 28 April 2019
- Government: Sánchez I
- Website: cortesgenerales.es

Senate
- Members: 266
- President: Manuel Cruz (PSOE)
- 1st Vice President: Cristina Narbona (PSOE)
- 2nd Vice President: Pío García-Escudero (PP)

Congress of Deputies
- Members: 350
- President: Meritxell Batet (PSOE)
- 1st Vice President: Gloria Elizo (UP)
- 2nd Vice President: Alfonso Rodríguez (PSOE)
- 3rd Vice President: Ana Pastor (PP)
- 4th Vice President: Ignacio Prendes (Cs)

The 13th Cortes Generales was a meeting of the Cortes Generales, the national legislature of Spain, with the membership determined primarily by the results of the general election held on 28 April 2019. The cortes met for the first time on 21 May 2019 and was dissolved prematurely on 24 September 2019.

== Election ==
The 13th Spanish general election under the 1978 Constitution was held on 28 April 2019. It saw the Spanish Socialist Workers' Party (PSOE) become the largest party in the Senate, the upper house of the Cortes Generales, for the first time since 1993, as well as the largest party in the Congress of Deputies, the lower house of the Cortes Generales, for the first time since 2008, but falling short of a majority.

Alliance	Senate		Congress of Deputies			
Alliance	Seats	+/−	Votes	%	Seats	+/−
PSOE	123	+81	7,513,142	28.67	123	+38
PP	54	–73	4,373,653	16.69	66	–69
Cs	4	+4	4,155,665	15.86	57	+25
UP–ECP–EC	0	–16	3,751,145	14.32	42	–29
Vox	0	±0	2,688,092	10.26	24	+24
ERC–Sob–ERPV	11	+1	1,024,628	3.91	15	+6
JxCat–Junts	2	±0	500,787	1.91	7	–1
EAJ/PNV	9	+4	395,884	1.51	6	+1
Others/blanks	5	–1	1,798,375	6.86	10	+5
Total	208	±0	26,201,371	100.00	350	±0

== History ==
The new Senate met for the first time on 21 May 2019 and elected Manuel Cruz (PSOE) as President of the Senate of Spain.

The new Congress of Deputies also met for the first time on 21 May 2019 and after two rounds of voting Meritxell Batet (PSOE) was elected as President of the Congress of Deputies with the support of the Unidos Podemos-En Comú Podem (UP-ECP) and various nationalist and regionalist parties.

In July 2019 caretaker Prime Minister Pedro Sánchez (POSE) failed to secure the necessary votes in congress to form a government after the failure of coalition talks with UP–ECP. Sánchez announced on 17 September 2019 that an election would be held on 10 November 2019, the fourth in as many years. The 13th Cortes Generales was formally dissolved on 24 September 2019.
