= Board of Spokespersons =

The Board of Spokespersons (Spanish: Junta de Portavoces, is a parliamentary body of each house of the Cortes Generales and is a council of party representatives mainly entrusted with the task of advising the Bureau on the agenda of the Parliament. The Board also decides on the composition of parliamentary committees.

Each House (the Senate and the Congress of Deputies) possesses its own Board of Spokespersons made up by the Speaker of the House and the Spokespersons of every parliamentary group.

Each Board meets every week during the session of Parliament.

== Members ==
=== Chairperson ===
The Chairperson of the Board of Spokespersons is the Speaker of the respective House.

=== Spokesperson ===
The spokesperson of each parliamentary group is a full member of the Board of Spokespersons. A parliamentary group's spokesperson is the whip and act's upon orders of the leader of the political party (who is also president of the parliamentary group).

==== Mixed Group ====
The Mixed Group is a parliamentary group made up of the members of political parties without enough MPs to form their own Parliamentary Group. From the members of this group a Spokesperson is chosen to represent them in the same way as any other group.

=== Other attendees ===
The representative of the executive branch (normally the Secretary of State for Relations with the Cortes or the Director-General for Relations with the Cortes also attends the Boards meetings. The Clerks of the Cortes Generales (chief legal counsel, Spanish: Letrado Mayor del Congreso de Diputados) also attend to give legal advice.

== Senate ==
The Board of Spokespersons of the Senate is made up by the Speaker of the Senate and the Spokespersons of the Parliamentary Groups. In addition to Parliamentary Groups, Senators can form Territorial Groups (groups of Senators from an autonomous community), and two representatives from each territorial group may attend meetings of the Board of Spokespersons when what is going to be discussed affects a specific region).

The Board of Spokespersons must be consulted to arrange:

- The dates on which the sessions of the House begin and end.
- The agenda of the sessions of the Senate.
- The criteria that contribute to order and facilitate the debates and tasks of the Senate.
- The interpretive or supplementary rules that may be dictated by the Speaker.

=== Senate' Board ===
sinmarco Board of Spokespersons of the Senate
Office	Name	Parliamentary Group
Chairperson (Speaker)	Ander Gil	Socialist Group
Spokesperson	Eva Granados	Socialist Group
Spokesperson	Javier Maroto	Popular Group
Spokesperson	Mirella Cortès Gès	Republican Left-EH Bildu Group
Spokesperson	Miguel Sánchez López	Citizens Group
Spokesperson	Jokin Bildarratz	Basque Group
Spokesperson	Josep Lluís Cleries	Nationalist Group
Spokesperson	Carles Mulet García	Confederal Left Group
Spokesperson	Alberto Prudencio Catalán	Mixed Group

=== Deputy Spokespersons ===
- Socialist Group
  - Julián Antonio Rodríguez Esquerdo.
  - Francisco Javier Aragón Ariza.
  - María Mercedes Berenguer Llorens.
  - Ramón Morales Quesada.
  - Riansares Serrano Morales.
  - María José Villalba Chavarría.
- Popular Group
  - Salomé Pradas Ten.
  - José Manuel Barreiro Fernández
- Republican Left-EH Bildu Group
  - Bernat Picornell Grenzner.
  - Gorka Elejabarrieta Díaz.
- Citizens Group
  - Francisco José Carillo Guerrero.
  - Ruth Goñi Sarries.
- Basque Group
  - Maribel Vaquero.
  - Nerea Ahedo Ceza.
- Nationalist Group
  - María del Mar del Pino Julios Reyes.
- Podemos Group
  - Sara Vilà Galán.
- Mixed Group
  - Alberto Prudencio Catalán Higueras.
  - Francisco José Alcaraz.

== Congress of Deputies ==
The Board of Spokespersons of the Congress of Deputies is made up by the Speaker of the Congress of Deputies and the Spokespersons of the Parliamentary Groups. The Spokesperson or the Deputy Spokesperson (if the Spokesperson can't attend) may be assisted by a member of its Parliamentary Group, although with no vote. Meetings of the Board must include at least one of the Vice Presidents (or Deputy Speakers) of the Congress, one Secretary of the Congress and the Secretary-General of the Congress of Deputies (an administrative office held by the Senior Clerk).

The Board of Spokespersons is responsible for:

- Drawing up the agenda of the sessions of Congress
- Discussing any other matters that the Government or a Parliamentary Group considers need to be discussed

=== Congress' Board ===
Board of Spokespersons of the Congress of Deputies
Office	Name	Party
Chairperson (Speaker)	Meritxell Batet	Socialist Party Group
Spokesperson	Patxi López	Socialist Party Group
Spokesperson	Cuca Gamarra	People's Party Group
Spokesperson	Inés Arrimadas	Ciudadanos Group
Spokesperson	Pablo Echenique Robba	Unidas Podemos Group
Spokesperson	Iván Espinosa de los Monteros	Vox Group
Spokesperson	Gabriel Rufián	Republican Group
Spokesperson	Aitor Esteban	Basque Group
Spokesperson	Mertxe Aizpurua	EH Bildu Group
Spokesperson	Laura Borràs	Plural Group
Spokesperson	Mireia Vehí	Mixed Group

=== Deputy Spokespersons ===
- Socialist Group
  - Rafael Simancas, First Deputy Spokesperson.
  - Ana Belén Fernández Casero, Second Deputy Spokesperson.
  - Susana Ros Martínez, Third Deputy Spokesperson.
  - Felipe Sicilia, Fourth Deputy Spokesperson.
  - José Zaragoza, Fifth Deputy Spokesperson.
  - Guillermo Antonio Meijón Couselo, Sixth Deputy Spokesperson.
- Popular Group
  - Isabel María Borrego Cortés.
  - José Ignacio Echániz.
  - Belén Hoyo Juliá.
  - Guillermo Mariscal Anaya.
  - Jaime Eduardo de Olano.
- Citizens Group
  - Fernando de Páramo.
  - Joan Mesquida.
  - Melisa Rodríguez.
  - Antonio Roldán.
  - Miguel Ángel Gutiérrez Vivas.
- Podemos Group
  - Alberto Garzón.
  - Jaume Asens.
  - Yolanda Díaz Pérez.
  - Ione Belarra.
  - Txema Guijarro.
- Vox Group
  - Javier Ortega Smith.
- Esquerra Republicana Group
  - Carolina Telechea
- Basque Group
  - Mikel Legarda.
- Mixed Group
  - Joan Baldoví

== Bibliography ==
- Sánchez de Dios, Manuel (1999). "Parliamentary Party Discipline in Spain" (PDF). In Bowler, Shaun; Farrell, David; Katz, Richard (eds.). Party Discipline and Parliamentary Government. Ohio State University Press. pp. 141–162. ISBN 0-8142-5000-9.
- "Standing Orders of the Congress of Deputies" (PDF). Congress of Deputies.
- "Standing Orders of the Senate". Senado de España. Senado de España.
