= President of the Congress of Deputies =

Presiding officer of the Spanish Congress of Deputies

- Coat of Arms of the Congress of Deputies

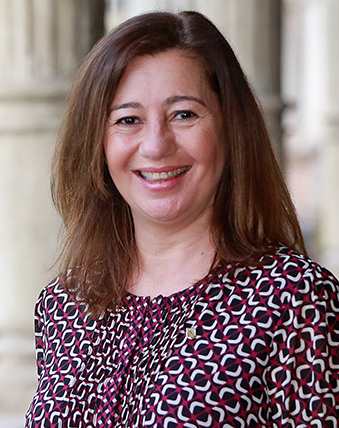
- Incumbent; Francina Armengol since 17 August 2023
- Congress of Deputies
- Style: The Most Excellent
- Seat: Palacio de las Cortes, Madrid
- Appointer: Congress of Deputies
- Term length: Four years, renewable
- Constituting instrument: Spanish Constitution
- Formation: 24 September 1810; 215 years ago
- First holder: Ramón Lázaro de Dou y de Bassols
- Deputy: Vice Presidents
- Salary: €230,926.48 annually
- Website: www.congreso.es

The president of the Congress of Deputies (Spanish: Presidente del Congreso de los Diputados) is the speaker of the Congress of Deputies, the lower house of the Cortes Generales (the Spanish parliament). The president is elected among the members of the Congress and is, after the king and the prime minister, the highest authority in the Kingdom of Spain.

Although the president (or speaker) shares the representation of the Cortes Generales with the president of the Senate, the constitutional functions that are granted to the office in terms of royal countersigning and the election process of the Prime Minister, makes the president of the Congress the de facto leader of the legislative branch. This position is also reinforced by the asymmetric bicameralism that gives greater prominence to the lower house.

The current office was established by the Spanish Constitution of 1978, however, the position has a tradition of more than 200 years, since its creation in 1810 as President of the Cortes of Cádiz.

The current Speaker, of the 15th Cortes Generales (102nd since the Cortes of Cádiz), is Francina Armengol, a member of the Spanish Socialist Workers' Party who represents the electoral district of the Balearic Islands.

== Collective Presidency ==
There are traditionally two models for the presidency of a parliamentary assembly, the collective presidency composed of a Bureau, and individual speakership.

The first model has been called the "continental European model" since it has been adopted by most European parliaments including Spain. The bureau manages the house's work and the speaker chairs the bureau. In addition the Speaker chairs the chamber and guarantees the opposition's rights but does not give up their political affiliation and may participate in debates.

The second model is an individual speakership in which the holder of the office is the sole guarantor of the chamber’s independence and privileges, of which the archetype is the Speaker at Westminster. In this model, supervising the House's work is performed by others (for example, in many British Commonwealth countries, the Leader of the House). The United States House of Representatives represents a variation of this model with the Speaker being also the leader of the majority in the chamber, in contrast to the Speaker at Westminster who rejects all political affiliation.

== Functions ==
The Speaker

- directs and maintains order during debates to ensure progress of Congress business without hindrance
- directs and coordinates the Bureau's action
- represents the House
- interprets the standing orders but subject to agreement with the Bureau and Board of Spokespersons

== Election ==
The speaker or president of the Congress of Deputies is elected during the constitutive session which is the first sitting following the General Elections of the Kingdom or during the next session following the resignation of the Speaker.

The first step is to establish a temporary body composed by the oldest member of each House which acts as Acting Speaker and two secretaries which are the youngest members of the House. This body oversees the electoral process of the Speaker.

The Speaker is elected by absolute majority or, failing that, through plurality in a second round between the two candidates that received most votes in the first round. The second vote needs only a simple majority (i.e., more «yes» than «no» votes). Each deputy is free to write the name they want on his ballot, even if the deputies of the majority group vote for a candidate predefined by their party.

The Speaker's term ends in case of death, resignation, loss of the status of deputy or after the dissolution of the Congress of Deputies, prior to the holding of general elections.

== Vice presidents ==
The Congress' Standing Orders establish that there are four deputy speakers (or vice presidents) of the Congress. All deputy speakers are elected using the single non-transferable vote method which ensures plurality, i.e. representation of the largest parties in the Congress.

Deputy speakers deputise for the Speaker in cases of vacancy, absence or impossibility to exercise. They may also be delegated functions by the Speaker. A deputy speaker must also be present at meetings of the Board of Spokespersons.

Order	Name	Term start	Party
1st	Alfonso Rodríguez	3 December 2019	PSOE
2nd	José Antonio Bermúdez de Castro	17 August 2023	PP
3rd	Esther Gil de Reboleno Lastortres	17 August 2023	Sumar
4th	Marta González Vázquez	17 August 2023	PP

== Bibliography ==
- "Standing Orders of the Congress of Deputies" (PDF). Congress of Deputies.
- Bergougnous, Georges (1997). Presiding Officers of National Parliamentary Assemblies. Geneva: Inter-Parliamentary Union. ISBN 92-9142-028-X.
