= 15th Cortes Generales =

Spanish parliament elected in 2023

←	14th	16th	→

Overview
- Legislative body: Cortes Generales
- Term: 17 August 2023 – 5 October 2026
- Election: 23 July 2023
- Government: Sánchez III
- Website: cortesgenerales.es

Senate
- Members: 265
- President: Pedro Rollán Ojeda (PP)
- 1st Vice President: Javier Maroto (PP)
- 2nd Vice President: Guillermo Fernández Vara (PSOE) (2023–2025); Concha Andreu (PSOE) (2025–2026)

Congress of Deputies
- Members: 350
- President: Francina Armengol (PSOE)
- 1st Vice President: Alfonso Rodríguez (PSOE)
- 2nd Vice President: José Antonio Bermúdez de Castro (PP)
- 3rd Vice President: Esther Gil de Reboleño (Sumar)
- 4th Vice President: Marta González (PP)

The 15th Cortes Generales were elected in the 2023 Spanish general election. The parliament was dissolved on 5 October 2026, during the Spanish housing protests.

== Election ==
The 15th Spanish general election was held on July 23, 2023. The People's Party became the largest party in the Congress of Deputies with 137 seats, overtaking the Spanish Socialist Workers' Party at 121 seats. However, neither major party nor their ostensible allies received enough seats to claim a parliamentary majority.

== Parliamentary leadership ==
The Congress of Deputies and the Senate of the 15th Cortes Generales were constituted at 10 a.m. on Thursday, August 17, 2023. That same day, the members of the Bureaus of both Chambers were also appointed, by secret ballot and in ballot box, directed by the corresponding tables.

These ballots were held following the general election held on 23 July 2023.

=== Congress of Deputies ===
==== Election of president ====
For the election of the Presidency of the Congress of Deputies and of the Board, a first vote is carried out, secret and in a ballot box, with the candidates who run for said position. In this, the absolute majority of the deputies (176/350) is necessary for a candidate to be elected as such. In the event that this absolute majority is not reached, a second vote is carried out, also secret and in a ballot box, with the two candidates with the most votes and the one who obtains a simple majority of the votes will be elected President of the Congress of Deputies.

Francina Armengol was elected president of the Congress of Deputies.

1st vote - Presidency (XV legislature) Majority required: absolute (176/350, 1st vote)
Candidate	Party	Votes	President
Francina Armengol	PSOE	178	Francina Armengol
Cuca Gamarra	PP	139	Francina Armengol
Ignacio Gil	Vox	33	Francina Armengol
Blank vote		0	Francina Armengol
Invalid vote		0	Francina Armengol
Total		350	Francina Armengol

==== Election of vice presidents ====
After the election of the Presidency, the four vice-presidencies are elected, using the same system as for the previous election. By secret ballot and ballot box, the four candidates with the most votes will be elected, with the first vice-president being the one who gets the most votes and the fourth vice-president, the one with the fewest. In the event of a tie, a second vote is taken between the tied candidates to settle the order.

candidate	Party	1st preference	2nd preference	Elected	
Alfonso Rodríguez Gómez de Celis	PSOE	113		1st Vice President	2nd Vice President
José Antonio Bermúdez de Castro	PP	73		Alfonso Rodríguez Gómez de Celis	José Antonio Bermúdez de Castro
Esther Gil de Reboleño Lastortres	Sumar	65	178	Alfonso Rodríguez Gómez de Celis	José Antonio Bermúdez de Castro
Marta González Vázquez	PP	65	139	Alfonso Rodríguez Gómez de Celis	José Antonio Bermúdez de Castro
Ignacio Gil Lazaro	Vox	33		3rd Vice President	4th Vice President
Blank vote		1	33	Esther Gil	Marta Gonzalez

==== Election of secretaries ====
After the election of the vice-presidents, the four secretariats are elected using the same system as in the Vice-Presidency. By secret ballot and ballot box, the four candidates with the most votes will be elected, with the first secretary being the one who gets the most votes and the fourth secretary, the one who gets the least. In the event of a tie, a second vote is taken between the tied candidates to settle the order.

Candidate	Party	1st preference	Elected	
Gerardo Pisarello	Sumar	101	1st Secretary	2nd Secretary
Isaura Leal Fernández	PSOE	77	Gerardo Pisarello	Isaura Leal Fernández
Guillermo Mariscal Anaya	PP	71	Gerardo Pisarello	Isaura Leal Fernández
María del Carmen Navarro Lacoba	PP	67	Gerardo Pisarello	Isaura Leal Fernández
Ignacio Gil Lazaro	Vox	33	3rd Secretary	4th Secretary
Blank vote		1	Guillermo Mariscal Anaya	María del Carmen Navarro Lacoba
Spoilt vote		0	Guillermo Mariscal Anaya	María del Carmen Navarro Lacoba

=== Senate ===
==== Election of president ====
For the election of the President of the Senate and of the Board, a first vote is carried out, secret and in a ballot box, with the candidates who run for said position. In this, the absolute majority of the deputies (134/266) is necessary for a candidate to be elected as such. In case this absolute majority is not reached, a second vote is carried out, also secret and in a ballot box, with the two candidates with the most votes and the one who obtains a simple majority of the votes, will be elected President of the Senate. Each senator casts a single vote, that is, they write a single name on the ballot.

Pedro Rollán was elected President of the Senate.

1st vote - Presidency (XV legislature) Majority required: absolute (130/259, 1st vote)
Candidate	Party	1st preference	President
Pedro Rollan Ojeda	PP	142	Pedro Rollan
Angel Pelayo Gordillo	Vox	3	Pedro Rollan
Blank vote		114	Pedro Rollan
Spoilt vote		0	Pedro Rollan
Total		259	Pedro Rollan

==== Election of vice presidents ====
After the election of the Presidency, the election of the two vice-presidencies is carried out, through the same system as for the previous election. By secret ballot and ballot box, the two candidates with the most votes will be elected, with the first vice president being the one who gets the most votes and the second vice president the one who gets the fewest. In the event of a tie, a second vote is taken between the tied candidates to settle the order. As in the election for the Presidency, each senator casts a single vote, that is, they write a single name on the ballot.

Candidate	Party	1st preference	Elected	
Javier Maroto	PP	142	1st Vice President	2nd Vice President
Guillermo Fernández Vara	PSOE	98	Javier Maroto	Guillermo Fernández Vara
Blank vote		1	Javier Maroto	Guillermo Fernández Vara
Spoilt vote		0	Javier Maroto	Guillermo Fernández Vara
Total		259	Javier Maroto	Guillermo Fernández Vara

==== Election of the secretaries ====
After the election of the vice-presidents, the election of the four secretariats is carried out, with a different system from the two previous ones. By secret ballot box, the four candidates with the most votes will be elected, with the first secretary being the one who gets the most votes and the fourth secretary, the one who gets the least. In the event of a tie, a second vote is taken between the tied candidates to settle the order. However, each senator casts a double vote, that is, on the ballot he writes two names of the candidates he wants to vote for.

1st vote - Secretariats (XV legislature)
Candidate	Party	1st preference	Elected	
Eva Ortiz Vilella	PP	142	1st Secretary	2nd Secretary
María del Mar Blanco	PP	139	Eva Ortiz Vilella	María del Mar Blanco
Maria Ángeles Luna	PSOE	112	Eva Ortiz Vilella	María del Mar Blanco
Francisco Fajardo Palarea	PSOE	110	Eva Ortiz Vilella	María del Mar Blanco
Angel Pelayo Gordillo	Vox	3	3rd Secretary	4th Secretary
Blank vote		2	Maria Ángeles Luna	Francisco Fajardo
Spoilt vote		0	Maria Ángeles Luna	Francisco Fajardo
Total		259	Maria Ángeles Luna	Francisco Fajardo
