= José Antonio Bermúdez de Castro =

Spanish politician (born 1959)

José Antonio Bermúdez de Castro MP
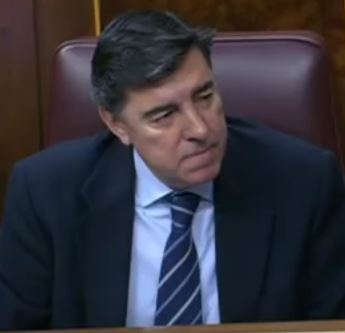

Second Vice President of the Congress of Deputies
- Incumbent
- Assumed office August 17, 2023
- President: Francina Armengol
- Preceded by: Ana Pastor

Secretary of Formation of the People's Party
- Incumbent
- Assumed office April 3, 2022
- President: Alberto Núñez Feijóo

Spokesperson of the People's Party Parliamentary Group in the Congress of Deputies
- In office May 21, 2019 – July 30, 2019
- President: Pablo Casado
- Preceded by: Dolors Montserrat
- Succeeded by: Cayetana Álvarez de Toledo

Personal details
- Born: José Antonio Bermúdez de Castro Fernández; 5 September 1959 (age 66) León, Spain
- Party: People's Party
- Education: University of Salamanca
- Occupation: Politician

José Antonio Bermúdez de Castro Fernández (León, September 5, 1959) is a Spanish politician of the People's Party, current deputy for Salamanca. He is the son of the former deputy of the People's Coalition, Pilar Fernández Labrador and descendant of José Bermúdez de Castro Rascón, who was also a deputy and senator in the late nineteenth century, during the Restoration.

== Biography ==
Born on September 5, 1959, in León, he has been a member of parliament in the VI, VII, VIII, IX, X, XI, XII, XIII, XIV and XV Cortes Generales. Degree in Law from the University of Salamanca. Specialized in Corporate Legal and Tax Consultancy (ICADE). Administrative Manager. Member of the Assembly of Madrid (1991–1996).
