= Eva Ortiz Vilella =

Spanish politician (born 1975)

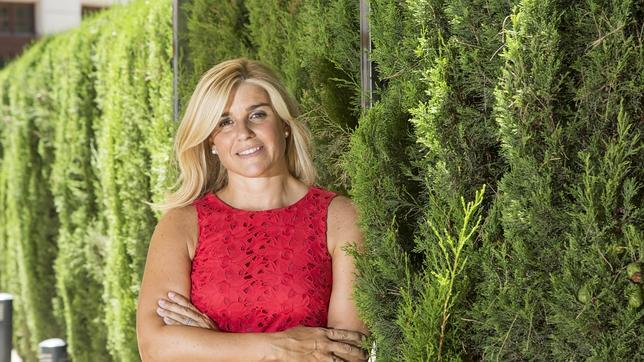

First Secretary of the Spanish Senate
- Incumbent
- Assumed office August 17, 2023
- President: Pedro Rollán
- Preceded by: Francisco Manuel Fajardo

Senator in the Spanish Parliament for Alicante
- Incumbent
- Assumed office August 17, 2023

Spokesperson of the Parliamentary Group People's Party in the Valencian Parliament
- In office May 20, 2021 – September 7, 2021
- Preceded by: Isabel Bonig
- Succeeded by: María José Catalá

Member of the European Parliament for Spain
- In office December 1, 2011 – June 30, 2014

Personal details
- Born: 16 October 1975 (age 50) Orihuela, Spain
- Party: People's Party of the Valencian Community
- Occupation: Politician

Eva Ortiz Vilella (born October 16, 1975) is a Spanish politician, first secretary of the Senate of Spain in the XV Cortes Generales. She was Deputy Spokesperson of the People's Party Parliamentary Group, secretary general of the People's Party of the Valencian Community and deputy in the Valencian Parliament since 2015.

== Biography ==
Born in the Alicante municipality of Orihuela (San Bartolomé) on October 16, 1975. She is a civil servant of the City Council of Orihuela (Alicante). She began her political career as a member of the People's Party of the Valencian Community (Spanish: Partido Popular de la Comunidad Valenciana, PPCV). Some time later she came to occupy her first position of responsibility as First Deputy mayor and Councillor for Urban Planning, Heritage and Media of the City Council of Orihuela, between 2003 and 2007. And from that last year until 2011 she was Councillor for Development, Employment, Industry and Housing.

During that time, at the same time she was presented in the lists of the People's Party to the European Parliament Elections of 2009. After the entry into force of the Lisbon Treaty, which expanded the composition of the European Parliament by 18 more people, Eva Ortiz became an MEP on December 1, 2011.

A few months earlier, on June 9 of the same year, she had been elected as a deputy in the Corts Valencianes but had to resign on December 9 due to incompatibility. Subsequently, she was part of the PPCV list for the 2014 European Parliament elections.

In 2015, she was appointed General Coordinator of the People's Party of the Valencian Community, deputy in the Valencian Parliament for the Province of Alicante and Deputy Spokesperson of the People's Party of the Valencian Community. Since July 2021, she was replaced as Secretary General of the Partido Popular de la Comunidad Valenciana by María José Català and since September 2021 she was also replaced as a PP trustee in Les Corts by María José Català.
