= Esther Gil de Reboleño Lastortres =

Spanish sociologist and politician (born 1973)

Esther Gil de Reboleño Lastortres MP
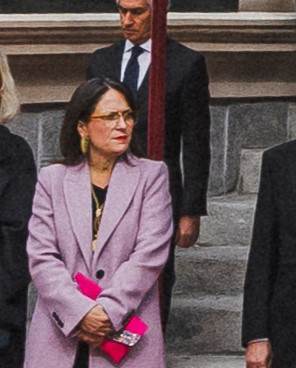

Third Vice President of the Congress of Deputies
- Incumbent
- Assumed office 17 August 2023
- President: Francina Armengol
- Preceded by: Gloria Elizo

Member of the Congress of Deputies for Cádiz
- Incumbent
- Assumed office 17 August 2023

Personal details
- Born: 28 February 1973 (age 53) Cádiz, Spain
- Party: Movimiento Sumar
- Education: University of Santiago de Compostela
- Occupation: Sociologist

Esther Gil de Reboleño Lastortres (born 28 February 1973) is a Spanish sociologist and politician.

In 2022 the Regional Government of Andalusia awarded her the Meridiana Prize, in the category of entrepreneurial initiatives.

She ran as an independent candidate in the Spanish general elections of 2023 on the lists of the political platform Sumar, headed by Yolanda Díaz. She was elected deputy for the province of Cádiz in the 15th Cortes Generales and, during the constitution of the Cortes Generales, she was elected third vice-president of the Congress of Deputies.
