= Ignacio Gil =

Spanish politician (born 1957)

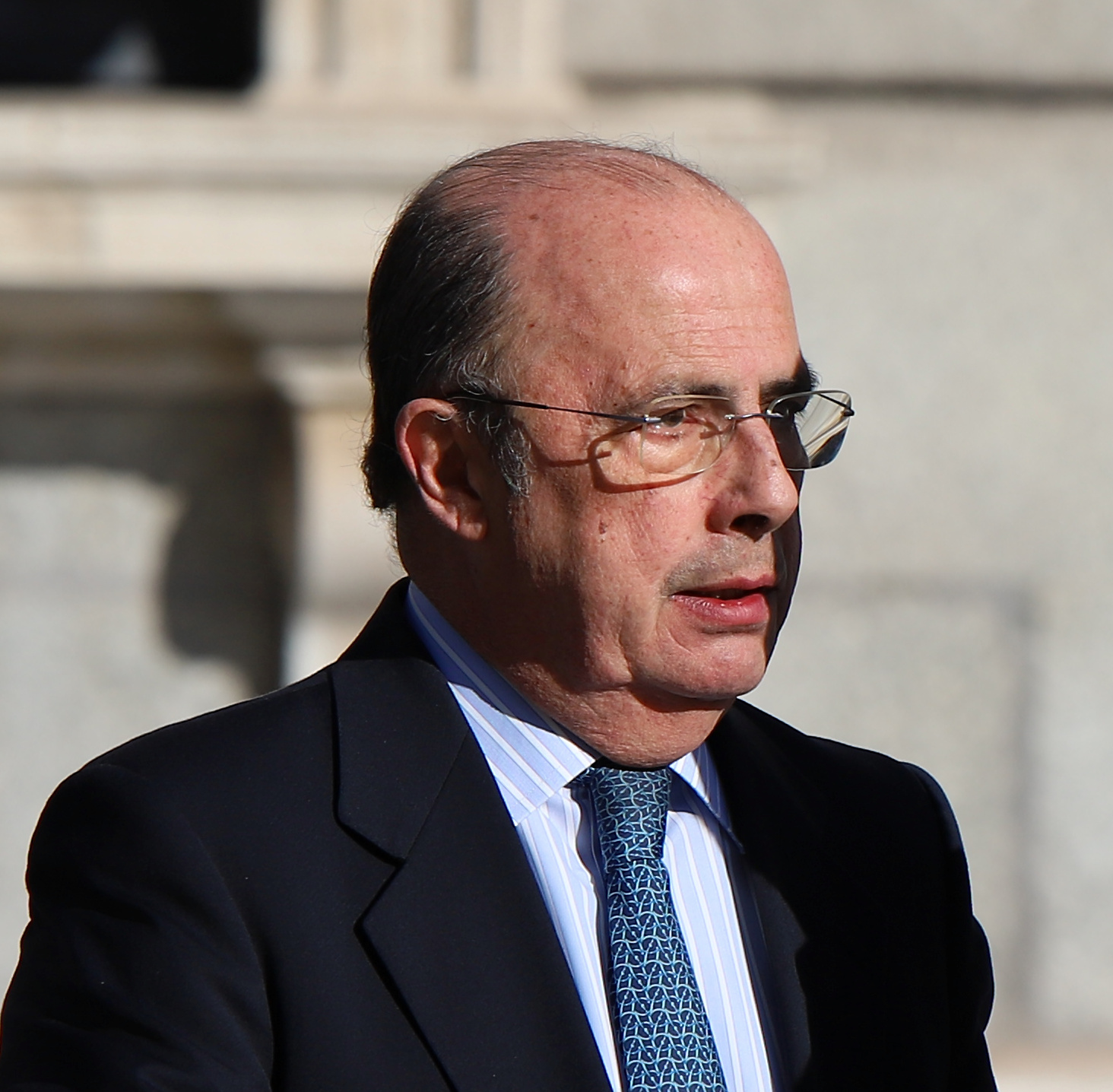
The deputy Ignacio Gil Lázaro in front of the Congreso de Diputados in Madrid on the first day of a possible election of a new Spanish president.

Ignacio Gil Lázaro, MP (born 23 September 1957, in Valencia, Spain) is a Spanish politician who belongs to the Vox Party.

Married with four children, Gil qualified in law. He entered politics in 1980 when he joined the Popular Alliance, the forerunners of the PP. Two years later he was elected to the Spanish Congress of Deputies representing Valencia region. He represented the area from 1982 until 1989 when he served one term in the Spanish Senate for the same province. He returned to the lower chamber at the 1993 election.

In one of his first votes in the 2008 legislature, he mistakenly voted for the Spanish Socialist Workers' Party (PSOE) candidate for Prime Minister, José Luis Rodríguez Zapatero, a mistake that was subsequently corrected.

At the 2015 election, he was placed seventh on the PP list and lost his seat when his party was reduced from nine seats to five in the Province.

Ignacio Gil Lázaro is a controversial figure in Spanish politics. He was a member of the radical wing of the PP and is known for his insults to opposition parties and for being one of the main promoters of conspiracy theories about the Madrid bombings of March 11, 2004.

On 28 April 2019 he was elected as a VOX deputy at the Cortes Generales for Valencia.
