= President of the Senate of Spain =

Presiding officer of the Spanish Senate

President of the Senate
- Presidente del Senado
- Coat of Arms of the Senate of Spain

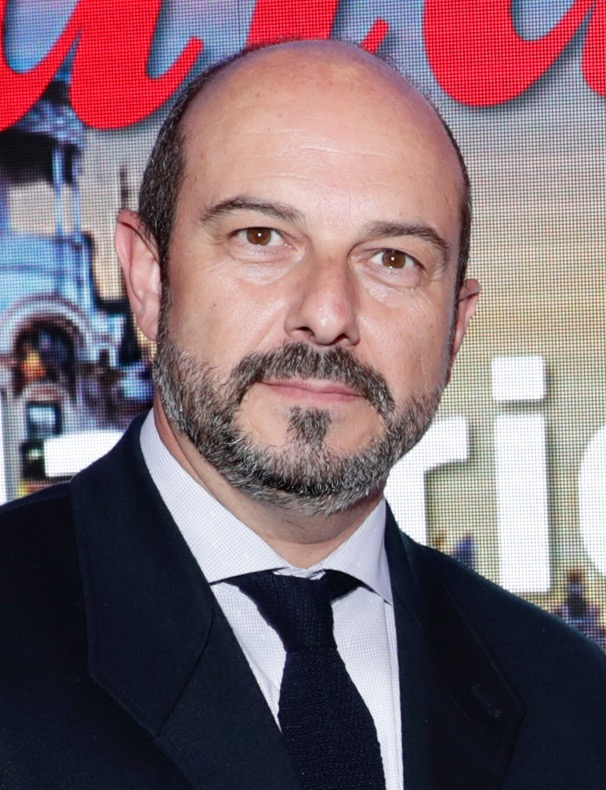
- Incumbent; Pedro Rollán since 17 August 2023
- Senate of Spain
- Style: The Most Excellent
- Seat: Palacio del Senado, Madrid
- Appointer: Senate
- Term length: Four years, renewable
- Constituting instrument: Spanish Constitution
- Formation: 16 April 1834; 192 years ago
- First holder: Francisco Javier Castaños, 1st Duke of Bailén
- Deputy: Vice Presidents
- Salary: €177,000 annually

The president of the Senate is the presiding officer of the Spanish Senate, the upper house of Spain's Cortes Generales. It is the fourth authority of the country after the Monarch (Head of State), the Prime Minister (Head of Government) and the President of the Congress of Deputies (Speaker of the Lower House). The president is elected among and by the incumbent senators. When the president is unable to exercise power, vice presidents of the Senate exercise the powers of the Senate president.

Although it shares the representation of the Cortes Generales with the President of the Congress, the constitutional preponderance granted to the latter due to the asymmetry of the Spanish bicameralism, allows the President of the Congress to assume the leadership of the Cortes, leaving the President of the Senate in background.

The current office was established by the 1978 Constitution, however, the position has a tradition of almost 200 years, since its creation in 1834 when it was called President of the House of Peers.

As of the 15th term of the Cortes Generales, the current officeholder is Pedro Rollán, a member of the Popular Parliamentary Group representing Madrid.

== Functions ==
The functions of the President of the Senate of Spain are:

- To be the Speaker of the House and its representative in all official acts.
- To convene and preside over the sessions of the Senate Plenary and to keep the order of the discussions, direct the debates and convene and preside over the Senate Bureau.
- To convene and preside over, whenever it deems appropriate, any Senate Committee.
- To announce the agenda of the Senate Plenary.
- To maintain communications with the central government and other authorities.
- To sign, with one of the Secretaries, the messages that the Senate must address.
- To interpret the Senate's standing rules.
- To supply, in agreement with the Bureau of the Committee on Rules, the gaps of this one.
- To ensure observance of the standing orders and of the parliamentary courtesy and parliamentary usage.
- To implement measures regarding parliamentary discipline.
- The President also performs all other functions conferred by the Constitution, the laws and the standing orders

== Election ==
The President of the Senate is elected during the constitutive session which follows the General Elections of the Kingdom or during the next session following the resignation of the incumbent President.

The election of the President needs an absolute majority in the House. If an absolute majority is not reached in the first vote, a second vote is held immediately after the announcement of the results by the Acting President of the House (the elder senator). The second vote needs only a simple majority (i.e., more "yes" than "no" votes). Each senator is free to write the name he wants on his ballot, even if those senators of the majority group vote for a candidate predefined by their party.

The President's term ends in case of death, resignation, loss of the status of senator or after the dissolution of the Senate, prior to a new general election.

== Vice presidents ==
According to the Standing Rules of the Senate, there are two Vice Presidents of the Senate elected in the constitutive session after the election of the President (Part I § 5). The Vice Presidents do not need an absolute majority, they are elected in a unique voting and the two most voted candidates are elected (Part I § 5).

The only task that the standing orders entrust to the Vice Presidents is that to replace the President in cases of vacancy, absence or impossibility to exercise (Part I § 40).

Order	Name	Term start	Group
1st	Javier Maroto	17 August 2023	People's Group in the Senate
2nd	Guillermo Fernández Vara	17 August 2023	Socialist Parliamentary Group

== List of presidents ==
Since its creation in 1834, 44 people have served as president in 63 presidencies. The first president was the Duke of Bailé who served for 60 days before resigning. The shortest presidency was that of the Marquess of Miraflores which was president briefly between August 3 and August 12, 1836 and the longest was that of Javier Rojo serving 7 years, 8 months and 10 days. Many presidents have served in non-consecutive terms in office; The Marquess of Miraflores and Eugenio Montero Ríos served in five non-consecutives terms. The first woman who have served as president was Esperanza Aguirre, between 1999 and 2002. The current and 63rd President is Pedro Rollán.
