= Alfonso Rodríguez Gómez de Celis =

Spanish politician (born 1970)

Alfonso Rodríguez Gómez de Celis MP
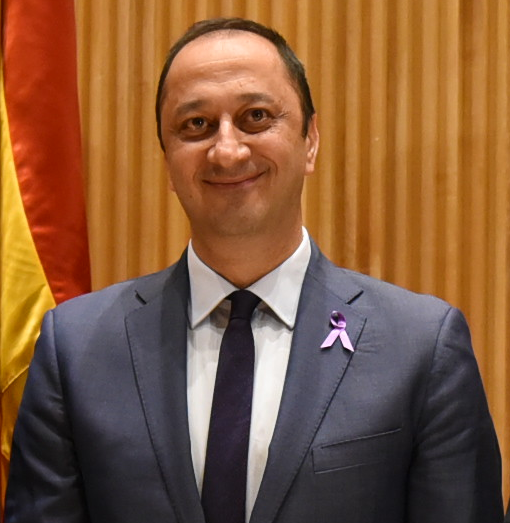

1st Vice President of the Spanish Congress of Deputies
- Incumbent
- Assumed office December 3, 2019
- President: Meritxell Batet; Francina Armengol
- Preceded by: Gloria Elizo

2nd Vice President of the Spanish Congress of Deputies
- In office May 21, 2019 – December 3, 2019
- Preceded by: Micaela Navarro
- Succeeded by: Ana Pastor Julián

Delegate of the Government of Spain in Andalusia
- In office June 19, 2018 – March 15, 2019
- Preceded by: Antonio Sanz
- Succeeded by: Lucrecio Fernandez

Secretary of Institutional Relations and Public Administrations of the Socialist Workers' Party
- Incumbent
- Assumed office June 18, 2018
- Preceded by: Susana Sumelzo

Member of the Spanish Congress of Deputies from Seville
- Incumbent
- Assumed office May 21, 2019

Member of the Andalusian Parliament from Seville
- In office April 19, 2012 – April 16, 2015

Councilor of the City Council of Seville
- In office June 14, 2003 – April 13, 2010

Personal details
- Born: Alfonso Rodríguez Gómez de Celis; July 29, 1970 (age 56) Seville, Spain
- Party: Socialist Workers' Party
- Education: University of Seville; King Juan Carlos University
- Occupation: Politician

Alfonso Rodríguez Gómez de Celis (born July 29, 1970) is a Spanish politician, a member of the Socialist Workers' Party and former mayor delegate of the Presidency and Urban Planning of the Seville City Council.

== Biography ==
He was born on Alhóndiga Street, in the central Santa Catalina neighborhood of the city of Seville, on July 29, 1970. Very young, he moved to the Polígono de San Pablo neighborhood, where he has lived until adulthood. He currently has his residence in the popular Triana neighborhood.

He graduated Diploma of Advanced Studies (DEA) in the doctorate of Business Administration and Marketing at the University of Seville in June 2009, and Degree in law, Degree in Labor Sciences from the King Juan Carlos University of Madrid and a diploma in Labor Relations from the University of Seville.

He is an expert in Local Management from the University of Seville and a Diploma of Advanced Studies (DEA) in the doctorate of Business Administration and Marketing from the University of Seville.

He is a labor and tax advisor, having served as such from 1994 to 1998.

Likewise, he has been a collaborating professor at the University of Seville, in the Faculty of Labor Sciences, within the Department of Labor Law and at the International University of Andalusia, in the Master's in Public Management of Tourism: sustainability and competitiveness. He is a visiting professor at York St. John's University in MA Leadership and Management.

== Political activity ==
His beginnings in politics were developed in the student sphere, both in high school and at the University, throughout the entire decade of the 80s. He was cloistered and a member of the Governing Board of the University of Seville. His leap into public life coincides with the student mobilizations against the General Organic Law of the Educational System in the late 1980s, being one of the leading figures of the Student Union and one of the architects of the agreements with the Ministry of Education.

In 1987 he joined the Socialist Youth, where he was elected vice president of the Federal Committee. Later he joined the Socialist Workers' Party, becoming the top organic manager for Seville.

Between 1998 and 2003 he held the position of provincial director of Seville of the Andalusian Youth Institute of the Council of the Presidency of the Regional Government of Andalusia.

Elected councilor of the Socialist Workers' Party in the Seville City Council in May 2003, he held the Office of the Mayor of Economy and Industry since June of the same year, as well as the Nervión-San Pablo District Delegation.

Later he was deputy mayor delegate for the Presidency and spokesman for the Government, the Seville City Council, holding political powers in tourism in the city and being responsible for other projects, such as the Metro_Centro and the pedestrianization of the historic center.

He directed the Socialist Workers' Party campaign in the Andalusian capital for the May 2007 elections, after which he was appointed Deputy Mayor Delegate for the Presidency and Finance of the Seville City Council, and head of the Coordination Area, as well as spokesman for the Municipal Socialist Group.

Between September 2008 and April 2010, the mayor of Seville, Alfredo Sánchez Monteseirín, entrusted him with the powers in urban planning for the city of Seville.

He was the General Secretary for Housing in Andalusia, from April 2010 to February 16, 2012.

Deputy of the Socialist Workers' Party of Andalusia in the Andalusian Parliament in the elections of March 25, 2012 for the province of Seville. On June 19, 2018, he became the delegate of the Government in Andalusia. He is relieved in March 2019 to stand for the general elections in the province of Seville. Elected to Congress, he is appointed Second Vice President of the Camára in May. After the general elections in November, he became First Vice President.

=== Positions held ===
1. Deputy Mayor Delegate of the Presidency and Urban Planning of the Seville City Council
2. Head of the Coordination Area of the Seville City Council
3. Spokesperson for the Socialist Group in the Seville City Council
4. Vice-president of the Municipal Management of Urbanism of Seville
5. Vice President of EMVISESA
6. Member of the Provincial Water Consortium of Seville
7. Member of the Consortium of the Palace of Exhibitions and Congresses of Seville
8. Member of the board of directors and of the Executive Commission of the Economic Interest Group of Municipal Companies of Seville AIE
9. Member of the Council of the Port Authority of Seville
10. Member of the Municipal Housing Council of Seville
11. Member of the Board of Trustees of the Real Alcázar of Seville
12. Member of the General Council of Cajasol
