= 2018 PP national party congress =

- 5 July 2018 (primary); 20−21 July 2018 (congress)

3,082 delegates in the National Congress Plurality of delegates needed to win
- Opinion polls
- Registered: 67,083 (primary)
- Turnout: 58,304 (86.9%) (primary); 2,973 (96.5%) (congress, executive); 2,971 (96.4%) (congress, board)
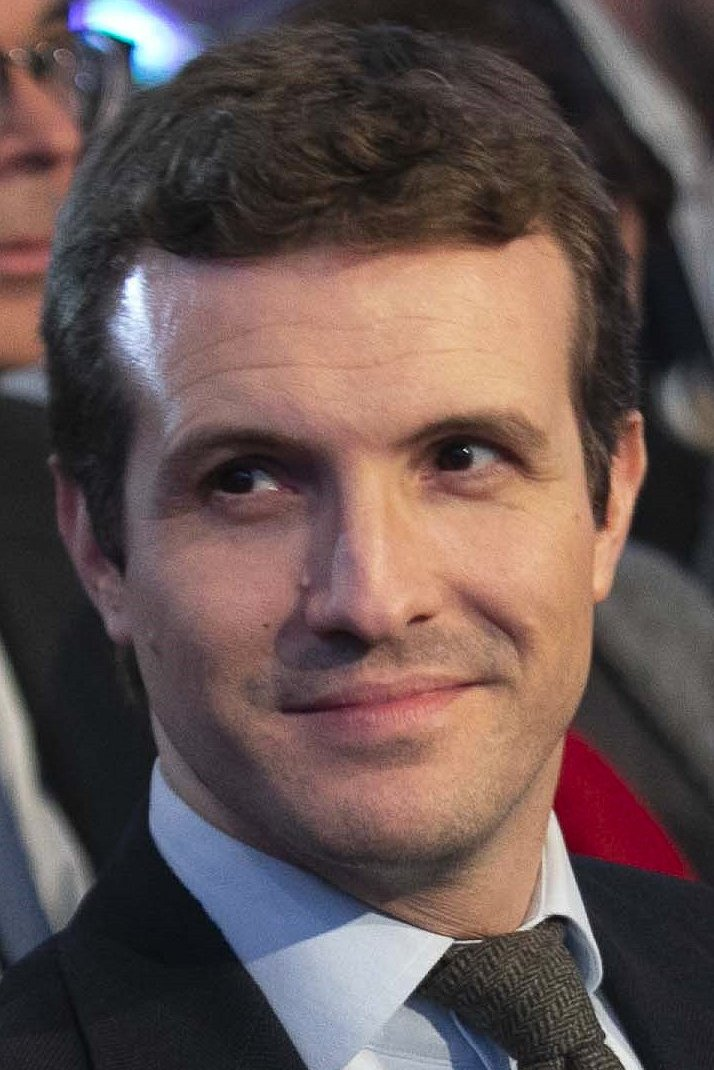

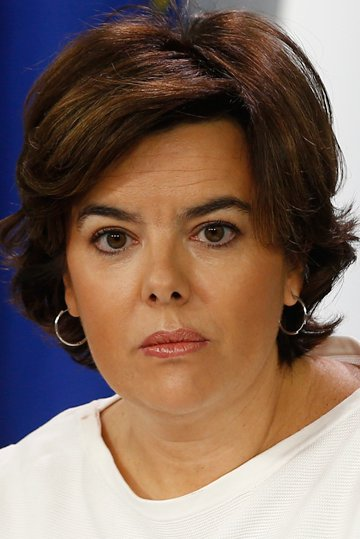

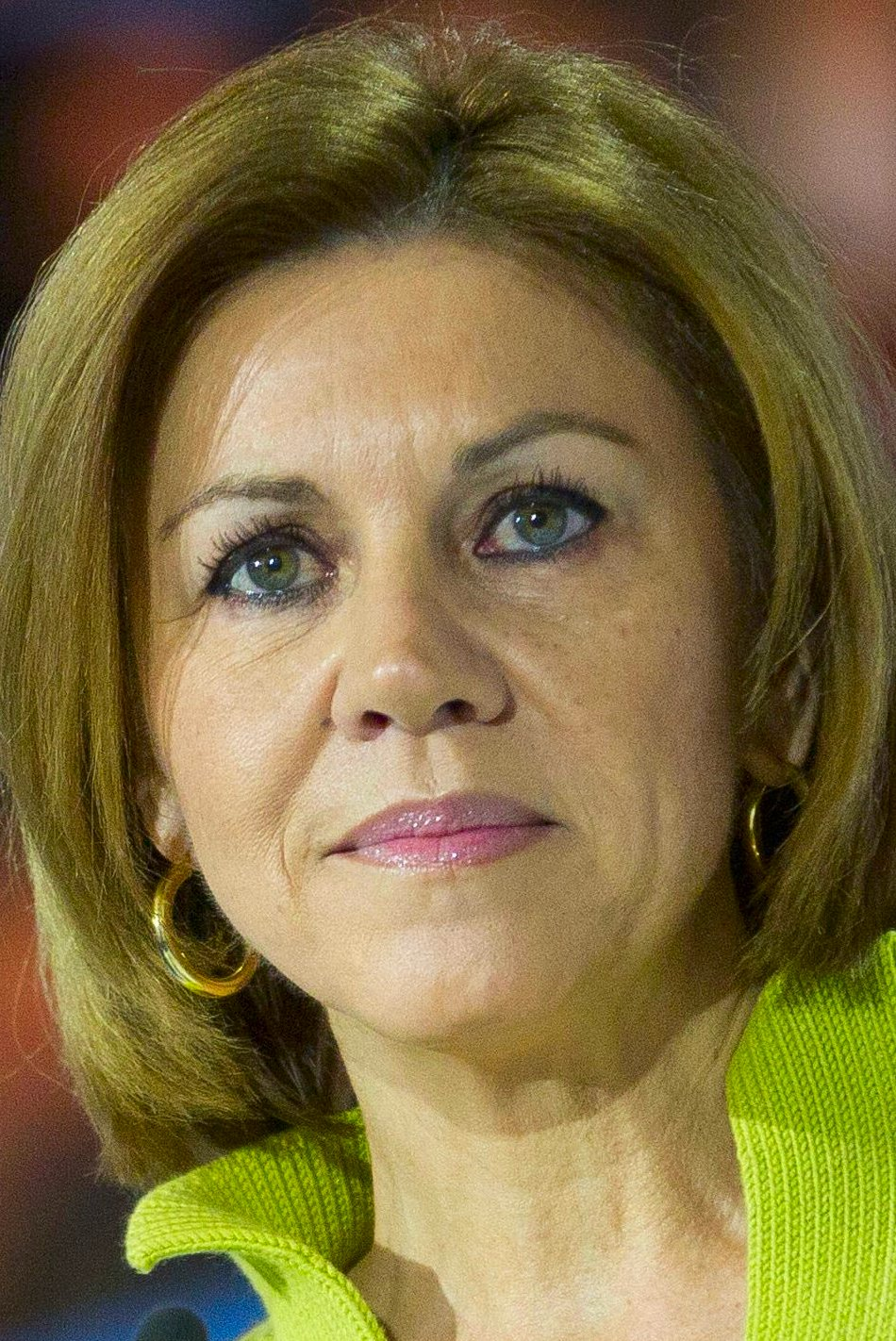
Candidate	Pablo Casado	Soraya Sáenz de Santamaría	María Dolores de Cospedal
Popular vote	19,954 (34.3%)	21,512 (36.9%)	15,092 (25.9%)
Delegate vote	1,701 (57.3%)	1,250 (42.1%)	Eliminated
Board	1,689 (56.9%)	1,251 (42.1%)	Eliminated
- Autonomous community results map
President before election
Mariano Rajoy
Elected President
Pablo Casado

The People's Party (PP) held its 19th national congress (of extraordinary nature) in Madrid from 20 to 21 July 2018, to renovate its governing bodies—including the post of president, which amounted to that of party leader. A primary election to elect the new party president was held on 5 July.

The congress was called by the party's National Board of Directors on 11 June as a consequence of former Spanish prime minister Mariano Rajoy's resignation as PP leader on 5 June, following the motion of no confidence that had voted his government down on 1 June. The leadership election was the first whereby PP members directly participate in choosing a leader for the party. On 26 June 2018, it was announced that only 66,706 PP members out of the 869,535 reported by the party had registered to vote in the election.

Former deputy prime minister Soraya Sáenz de Santamaría and the party's Deputy Secretary-general of Communication Pablo Casado topped the poll in the primary election held on 5 July 2018, becoming eligible for the run-off to be held among the party's delegates on 20−21 July. After preliminary data was published, Sáenz de Santamaría conceded the election and acknowledged Casado's victory. Casado's win, which was considered a party swing towards the right, was possible through the support to his candidacy of former party secretary-general María Dolores de Cospedal, who had been a bitter rival of Santamaría during the PP's time in government.

== Overview ==
The congress of the PP was the party's supreme body, and could be of either ordinary or extraordinary nature, depending on whether it was held following the natural end of its term or due to any other exceptional circumstances not linked to this event. Ordinary congresses were to be held every four years and called at least two months in advance of their celebration, though this timetable could be altered for up to twelve months in the event of coincidence with electoral processes. Extraordinary congresses had to be called by a two-thirds majority of the Board of Directors at least one-and-a-half month in advance of their celebration, though in cases of "exceptional urgency" this deadline could be reduced to 30 days.

The president of the PP was the party's head and the person holding the party's political and legal representation, and presided over its board of directors and executive committee, which were the party's maximum directive, governing and administration bodies between congresses.

=== Electoral system ===
The election of the PP president was based on a two-round system, introduced in the party statutes during the previous PP congress in 2017. Any party member with at least one-year membership was eligible for the post of party president, on the condition that they were up to date with the payment of party fees and that they were able to secure the signed endorsements of at least 100 party members. The election was to be held in the party's 60 constituencies, corresponding to each province and island of Spain.

In the first round, all registered party members who had their payment fees up to date were allowed to vote for any of the candidates who had been officially proclaimed by virtue of securing the required number of signatures to run. In the event that no candidate won the first round outright—which required securing at least 50 percent of the national vote, being the most voted candidate in at least half of the constituencies and at least a 15-percentage point advantage over the runner-up—a second round would be held concurrently with the party congress, in which party delegates would elect the new party leader from among the two candidates who had previously received the most votes in the first round. Most of the delegates were to be elected by party members concurrently with the first round of voting to the party leadership.

== Timetable ==
The key dates are listed below (all times are CEST. Note that the Canary Islands use WEST (UTC+1) instead):

- 11 June: Official announcement of the congress. Start of application period for party members to register in order to participate in the leadership election.
- 18 June: Start of candidate submission period at 12 pm.
- 20 June: End of candidate submission period at 2 pm.
- 22 June: Proclamation of candidates to the party presidency.
- 23 June: Official start of internal electoral campaigning (at 10 am).
- 25 June: Deadline for party members to register for voting at 2 pm.
- 29 June: Deadline for party members to apply as delegates at 2 pm.
- 4 July: Last day of internal electoral campaigning.
- 5 July: Primary election (first round of voting, with all registered party members entitled to vote for the proclaimed candidates) and election of congress delegates.
- 20−21 July: Party congress (if needed, a run-off voting was to be held among delegates to elect the party leader among the two most voted candidates in the first round).

== Candidates ==
Candidate	Notable positions	Announced	Campaign	Ref.
=== Proclaimed ===
Candidates who met endorsement requirements and were officially proclaimed to contest the party congress.
José Ramón García Hernández (age 47)	Member of the Congress of Deputies for Ávila (since 2015); Executive Secretary of International Relations of the PP (since 2012); Member of the Congress of Deputies for Madrid (2014–2015)	16 June 2018	(joserapp.es)	
Pablo Casado (age 37)	Deputy Secretary-General of Communication of the PP (since 2015); Member of the Congress of Deputies for Ávila (since 2011); President of NNGG in the Community of Madrid (2005–2013); Member of the Assembly of Madrid (2007–2009)	18 June 2018	(pablocasado.es)	
José Manuel García-Margallo (age 73)	Member of the Congress of Deputies for Alicante (since 2016); Minister of Foreign Affairs and Cooperation of Spain (2011–2016); Member of the European Parliament for Spain (1994–2011); Member of the Congress of Deputies for Valencia (1986–1994); Member of the Congress of Deputies for Melilla (1977–1982)	18 June 2018	(margallocandidato.es/)	
María Dolores de Cospedal (age 52)	Secretary-General of the PP (since 2008); President of the PP of Castilla–La Mancha (since 2006); Member of the Congress of Deputies for Toledo (since 2015); Minister of Defence of Spain (2016–2018); President of the Regional Government of Castilla–La Mancha (2011–2015); Member of the Cortes of Castilla–La Mancha for Toledo (2007–2015); Senator appointed by the Cortes of Castilla–La Mancha (2006–2011); Minister of Transport and Infrastructures of the Community of Madrid (2004–2006); Secretary of State of Security of Spain (2002–2004); Undersecretary of Public Administrations of Spain (2000–2002)	19 June 2018	(primeroelpp.es)	
Soraya Sáenz de Santamaría (age 47)	Member of the Congress of Deputies for Madrid (since 2004); Deputy Prime Minister of Spain (2011–2018); Minister of the Presidency and for Territorial Administrations of Spain (2016–2018); Minister of the Presidency of Spain (2011–2016); Spokesperson of the Government of Spain (2011–2016); Spokesperson of the People's Parliamentary Group in the Congress (2008–2011)	19 June 2018	(sorayapp.es)	
Elio Cabanes (age 43)	City Councillor of La Font de la Figuera (since 2011)	20 June 2018	—	
=== Failed to qualify ===
Candidates who announced an intention to run, but failed to qualify due to not meeting endorsement requirements.
José Luis Bayo (age 40)	President of NNGG in the Valencian Community (2000–2008)	18 June 2018	—	

=== Declined ===
The individuals in this section were the subject of speculation about their possible candidacy, but publicly denied or recanted interest in running:

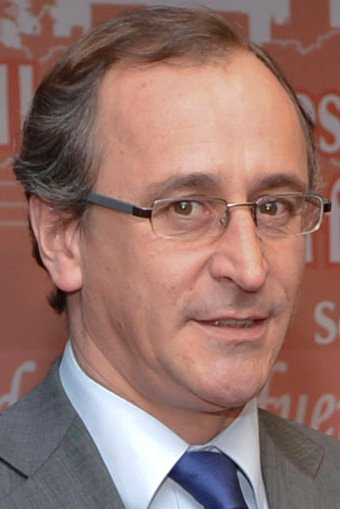
Alfonso Alonso

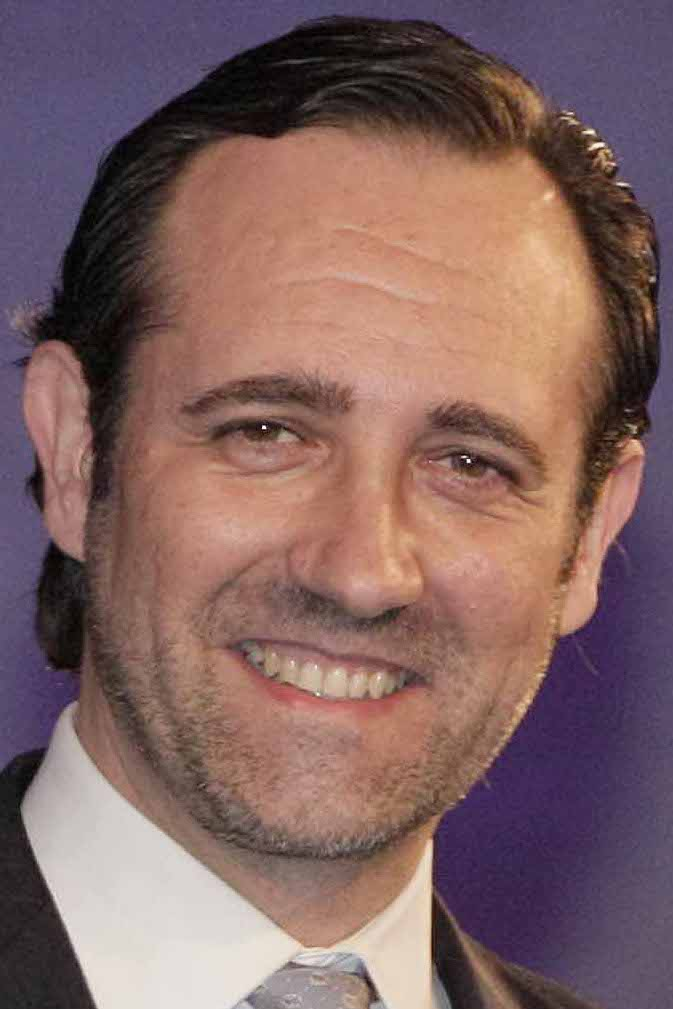
José Ramón Bauzá

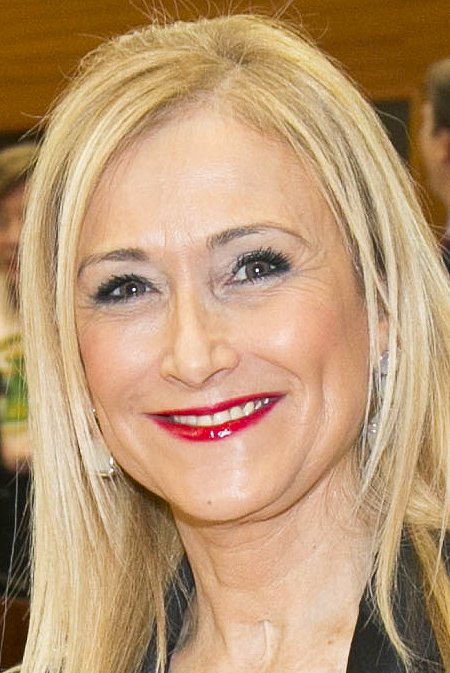
Cristina Cifuentes

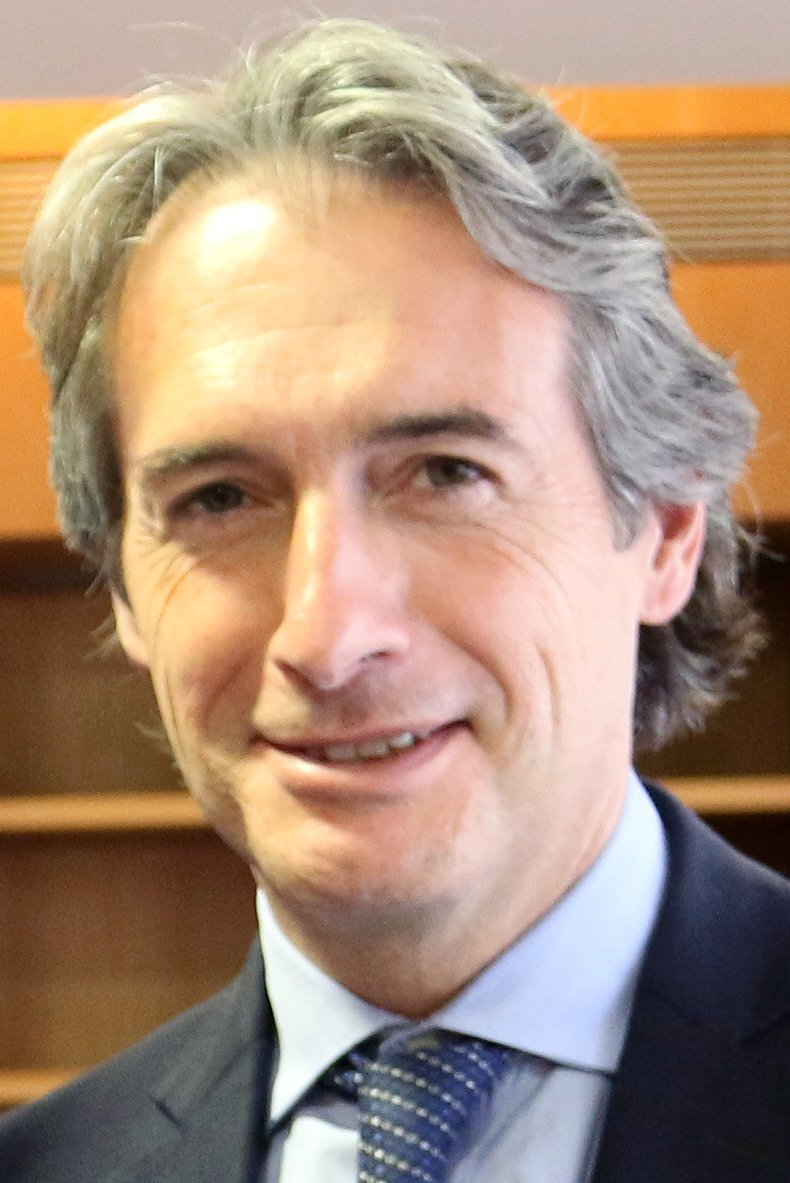
Íñigo de la Serna

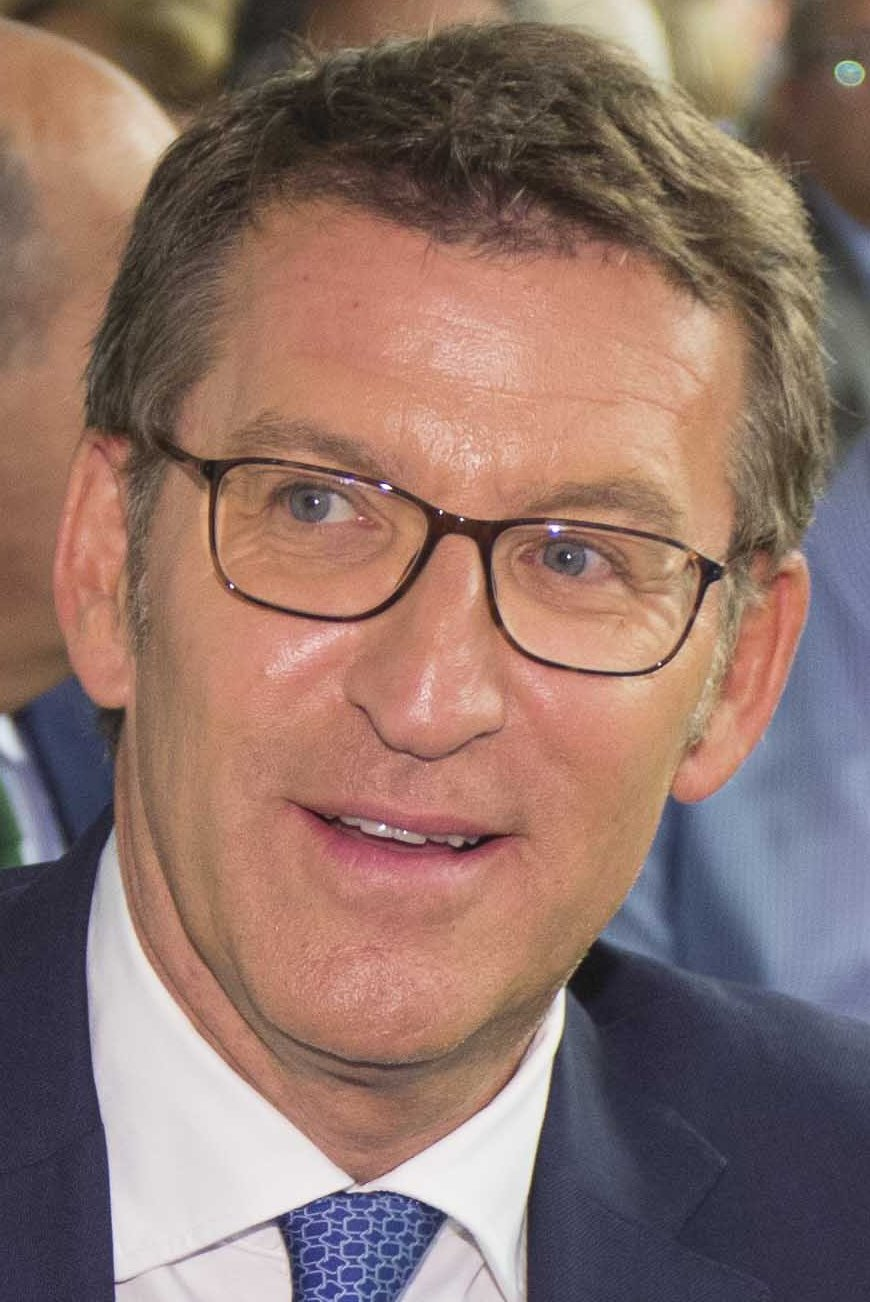
Alberto Núñez Feijóo

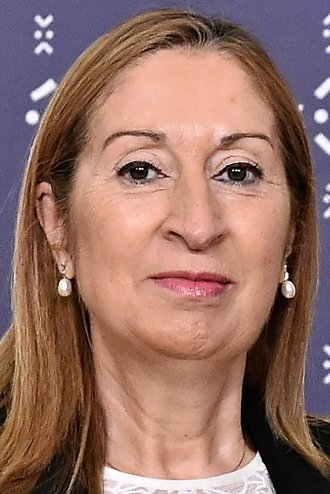
Ana Pastor

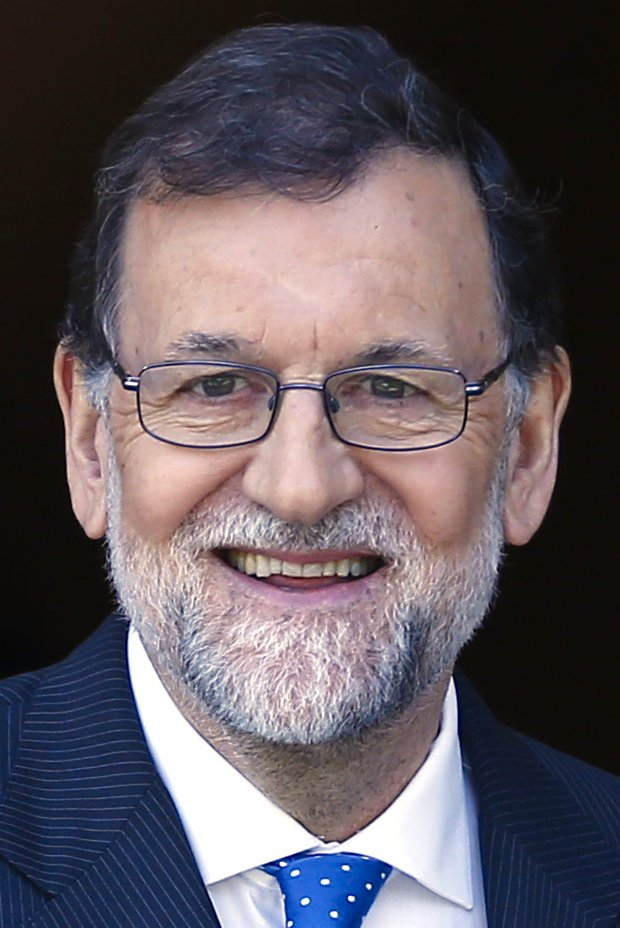
Mariano Rajoy
- Alfonso Alonso (age 51) — Member of the Basque Parliament for Álava (since 2016); President of the PP of the Basque Country (since 2015); Minister of Health, Social Services and Equality of Spain (2014–2016); Member of the Congress of Deputies for Álava (2000–2002 and 2008–2016); Spokesperson of the People's Parliamentary Group in the Congress (2011–2014); City Councillor of Vitoria (1996–2008); Mayor of Vitoria (1999–2007).
- José Ramón Bauzá (age 47) — Senator appointed by the Parliament of the Balearic Islands (since 2015); Member of the Parliament of the Balearic Islands for Mallorca (2011–2015); President of the Balearic Islands (2011–2015); President of the PP of the Balearic Islands (2009–2015); Mayor of Marratxí (2005–2011); City Councillor of Marratxí (1999–2011); Vice President of the PP of the Balearic Islands (2007–2009); Deputy Mayor for Urbanism and Health of Marratxí (2003–2005).
- Cristina Cifuentes (age 54) — President of the PP of the Community of Madrid (2017–2018); President of the Community of Madrid (2015–2018); Member of the Assembly of Madrid (1991–2012 and 2015–2018); President of the People's Group in the Assembly of Madrid (2015); Delegate of the Government of Spain in the Community of Madrid (2012–2015); First Vice President of the Assembly of Madrid (2005–2012); First Secretary of the Assembly of Madrid (1999–2003).
- Íñigo de la Serna (age 47) — Minister of Development of Spain (2016–2018); Member of the Parliament of Cantabria (2015–2016); President of the Council of European Municipalities and Regions (2015–2016); Mayor of Santander (2007–2016); City Councillor of Santander (2003–2016); President of the Spanish Federation of Municipalities and Provinces (2012–2015).
- Alberto Núñez Feijóo (age 56) — President of the Regional Government of Galicia (since 2009); President of the PP of Galicia (since 2006); Member of the Parliament of Galicia for Pontevedra (since 2005); First Vice President of the Xunta de Galicia (2004–2005); Minister of Territorial Policy, Public Works and Housing of Galicia (2003–2005); President of the State Society of Mail and Telegraphs (2000–2003); Secretary-General for Healthcare of Spain (1996–2000).
- Ana Pastor (age 60) — President of the Congress of Deputies (since 2016); Member of the Congress of Deputies for Pontevedra (since 1996); Minister of Development of Spain (2011–2016); Coordinator of Participation and Sectorial Action of the PP (2008–2012); Second Vice President of the Congress of Deputies (2008–2011); Executive Secretary of Social Policy and Welfare of the PP (2004–2008); Minister of Health and Consumer Affairs of Spain (2002–2004); Undersecretary of Interior of Spain (2001–2002); Undersecretary of the Presidency of Spain (2000–2001); Undersecretary of Education and Culture of Spain (1999–2000).
- Mariano Rajoy (age 63) — Prime Minister of Spain (2011–2018); President of the PP (2004–2018); Member of the Congress of Deputies for Madrid (1986 and 2004–2018); Leader of the Opposition of Spain (2004–2011); Secretary-General of the PP (2003–2004); Member of the Congress of Deputies for Pontevedra (1986 and 1989–2004); Spokesperson of the Government of Spain (2002–2003); Minister of the Presidency of Spain (2000–2001 and 2002–2003); First Deputy Prime Minister of Spain (2000–2003); Deputy Secretary-General of the PP (1990–2003); Minister of the Interior of Spain (2001–2002); Minister of Education and Culture of Spain (1999–2000); Minister of Public Administrations of Spain (1996–1999); President of AP/PP in the province of Pontevedra (1983–1986 and 1987–1991); Vice President of the Xunta de Galicia (1986–1987); President of the Provincial Deputation of Pontevedra (1983–1986); City Councillor of Pontevedra (1983–1986); Member of the Parliament of Galicia for Pontevedra (1981–1985); Director-General for Institutional Relations of Galicia (1982); Deputy Secretary of the Parliament of Galicia (1981–1982).

== Endorsements ==
=== Total ===
Candidates seeking to run were required to collect the endorsements of at least 100 party members.

Summary of candidate endorsement results
Candidate	Count	% V
Pablo Casado	~5,000	~54.23
María Dolores de Cospedal	3,336	36.18
José Manuel García-Margallo	~500	~5.42
Elio Cabanes	140	1.52
Soraya Sáenz de Santamaría	>100	>1.08
José Ramón García Hernández	>100	>1.08
José Luis Bayo	44	0.48
Total	>9,220	

Endorsements by party members
Casado	54.23%
Cospedal	36.18%
García-Margallo	5.42%
Cabanes	1.52%
Santamaría	1.08%
G. Hernández	1.08%
Bayo	0.48%

=== Public endorsements ===
==== Pablo Casado ====
Pablo Casado's endorsements
- Juan Ramón Adsuara, Mayor of Alfafar (since 2011)
- Esperanza Aguirre, former President of the Community of Madrid (2003–2012)
- Miguel Arias Cañete, former Minister of Agriculture (2000–2004 and 2011–2014)
- Ana Beltrán, President of the PP of Navarre (since 2017)
- Elio Cabanes, candidate in the first ballot (endorsed after his elimination from the contest)
- Diego Calvo, Vice President of the Parliament of Galicia (since 2016)
- Alfonso Candón, Deputy for Cádiz (since 2011)
- Francisco Cañizares, President of the PP of Ciudad Real (since 2017) (previously endorsed María Dolores de Cospedal)
- Ascensión Carreño, Deputy for Murcia (since 2011)
- Rafael Catalá, Deputy for Cuenca (since 2016) and former Minister of Justice (2014–2018) (previously endorsed María Dolores de Cospedal)
- José Ignacio Ceniceros, President of La Rioja (since 2015)
- Cristina Cifuentes, former President of the Community of Madrid (2015–2018)
- Silvia Clemente, President of the Cortes of Castile and León (since 2015) (previously endorsed María Dolores de Cospedal)
- Ignacio Cosidó, Senator appointed by the Cortes of Castile and León (since 2016) and former Director-General of the National Police Corps (2011–2016)
- María Dolores de Cospedal, Deputy for Toledo (since 2016), Secretary-General of the PP (since 2016), former Minister of Defence (2016–2018) and candidate in the first ballot (endorsed after her elimination from the contest)
- Francisco de la Torre, Mayor of Málaga (since 2000) (previously endorsed María Dolores de Cospedal)
- Jaime de Olano, Deputy for Lugo (since 2011)
- Celso Delgado, Deputy for Ourense (since 2000)
- Isabel Díaz Ayuso, Deputy Secretary-General of Communication of the PP of the Community of Madrid (since 2018)
- Rafael Domínguez, PP Spokesperson in the City Council of Pontevedra (since 2018)
- José Ignacio Echániz, former Regional Minister of Health and Social Affairs of Castilla–La Mancha (2011–2015)
- Alejandro Fernández, Deputy in the Parliament of Catalonia for Tarragona (since 2015)
- José Blas Fernández Sánchez, Senator for Cádiz (since 2000) (previously endorsed María Dolores de Cospedal)
- Rosa Gallego, PP Spokesperson in the City Council of A Coruña (since 2016)
- Óscar Gamazo Micó, Deputy for Valencia (since 2016)
- Mario Garcés, former Secretary of State of Social Services and Equality (2016–2018)
- Xavier García Albiol, President of the PP of Catalonia (since 2017)
- Teodoro García Egea, Deputy for Murcia (since 2012)
- José Ramón García Hernández, Deputy for Ávila (since 2016) and candidate in the first ballot (endorsed after his elimination from the contest)
- José Manuel García-Margallo, Deputy for Alicante (since 2016), former Minister of Foreign Affairs and Cooperation (2011–2016) and candidate in the first ballot (endorsed after his elimination from the contest)
- Isabel García Tejerina, Deputy for Madrid (since 2016) and former Minister of Agriculture, Food and the Environment (2014–2018) (previously endorsed María Dolores de Cospedal)
- Antonio González Terol, Deputy for Madrid (since 2016)
- Belén Hoyo, Deputy for Valencia (since 2011)
- Andrea Levy, Deputy Secretary-General of Studies and Programs of the PP (since 2015)
- José Loaiza, former President of the Provincial Deputation of Cádiz and Mayor of San Fernando (2011–2015)
- Fernando López Miras, President of the Region of Murcia (since 2017)
- Miguel Lorenzo, Deputy for A Coruña (since 2016)
- Guillermo Mariscal Anaya, Deputy for Las Palmas (since 2005)
- Javier Maroto, Deputy for Álava (since 2016), Deputy Secretary-General of Sectorial Action of the PP (since 2015) and former Mayor of Vitoria (2011–2015)
- Francisco Javier Márquez Sánchez, Mayor of Jaén (since 2015)
- Percival Manglano, former Minister of Economy and Finance of the Community of Madrid (2011–2012)
- José Luis Martínez-Almeida, PP Spokesperson in the City Council of Madrid (since 2017)
- Valentina Martínez Ferro, Deputy for Madrid (since 2018)
- José Antonio Monago, President of the PP of Extremadura (since 2008) and former President of the Regional Government of Extremadura (2011–2015) (previously endorsed María Dolores de Cospedal)
- Dolors Montserrat, Deputy for Barcelona (since 2008) and former Minister of Health, Social Services and Equality (2016–2018) (previously endorsed María Dolores de Cospedal)
- Elena Muñoz Fonteriz, PP Spokesperson in the City Council of Vigo (since 2016)
- Pedro Navarro, City Councillor of Zaragoza (since 2011)
- José Antonio Nieto, former Mayor of Córdoba (2011–2015) (previously endorsed María Dolores de Cospedal)
- Esperanza Oña, former Mayor of Fuengirola (1995–2014)
- José Ortiz Galván, Mayor of Vejer de la Frontera (since 2015)
- Enrique Ossorio, PP Spokesperson in the Assembly of Madrid (since 2015)
- Miguel Ángel Paniagua Núñez, Deputy for Palencia (since 2016)
- Ángeles Pedraza, former President of the AVT (2010–2016)
- Santiago Pérez López, Deputy for Granada (since 2016)
- Víctor Píriz, Deputy for Badajoz (since 2016)
- Jordi Roca Mas, Deputy for Tarragona (since 2016)
- Santi Rodríguez, Secretary-General of the PP of Catalonia (since 2017)
- Javier Ruano García, Deputy for Murcia (since 2016)
- Alfonso Rueda, Vice President of the Regional Government of Galicia (since 2018)
- Teresa Ruiz-Sillero, Member of the Parliament of Andalusia for Cádiz (since 2008)
- María San Gil, former President of the PP of the Basque Country (2004–2008)
- José Manuel Soria, former Minister of Industry, Energy and Tourism (2011–2016)
- Vicente Tirado, Secretary-General of the PP of Castilla–La Mancha (since 2006) (previously endorsed María Dolores de Cospedal)
- Juan Ignacio Zoido, Deputy for Seville (since 2016) and former Minister of the Interior (2016–2018) (previously endorsed María Dolores de Cospedal)

==== Elio Cabanes ====
Elio Cabanes' endorsements, prior to his elimination in the first ballot; endorsed Pablo Casado
- María José Penedés, former Mayor of La Font de la Figuera (1995–1999)

==== María Dolores de Cospedal ====
María Dolores de Cospedal's endorsements, prior to her elimination in the first ballot; endorsed Pablo Casado
- Ramón Aguirre Rodríguez, Deputy for Guadalajara (since 2016)
- José Jaime Alonso Díaz-Guerra, Deputy for Toledo (since 2016)
- María Jesús Bonilla, Deputy for Cuenca (since 2016)
- Francisco Cañizares, President of the PP of Ciudad Real (since 2017)
- Rafael Catalá, Deputy for Cuenca and former Minister of Justice (2014–2018)
- José María Chiquillo, Deputy for Valencia (1994–2000 and since 2016)
- Silvia Clemente, President of the Cortes of Castile and León (since 2015)
- Agustín Conde, former Secretary of State of Defence (2016–2018) and Mayor of Toledo (1995–1999)
- Francisco de la Torre, Mayor of Málaga (since 2000)
- María del Carmen Dueñas, Deputy for Melilla (since 2016)
- Beatriz Escudero Berzal, Deputy for Segovia (since 2016)
- José Blas Fernández Sánchez, Senator for Cádiz (since 2000)
- Carlos Floriano, Deputy for Cáceres (since 2008)
- Pío García-Escudero, President of the Senate of Spain (since 2011), President of the PP of the Community of Madrid (1993–2004 and since 2018)
- María José García-Pelayo, former Mayor of Jerez de la Frontera (2003–2005 and 2011–2015)
- Arturo García-Tizón, Deputy for Toledo (1982–1989 and since 2008) and former Secretary-General of AP (1987–1989)
- Isabel García Tejerina, Deputy for Madrid (since 2016) and former Minister of Agriculture, Food and the Environment (2014–2018)
- Mercedes Fernández, President of the PP of Asturias (since 2012)
- Ángel Garrido, President of the Community of Madrid (since 2018)
- Silvia Heredia, Deputy for Seville (since 2011)
- María del Carmen Hernández Bento, Deputy for Las Palmas (since 2016)
- Susana López Ares, Deputy for Asturias (since 2016)
- José Alberto Martín-Toledano, Deputy for Ciudad Real (since 2011)
- Juan José Matarí, Deputy for Almería (since 2000)
- Lola Merino, Deputy Spokesperson of the PP of Castilla–La Mancha (since 2012)
- Francisco Molinero Hoyos, Deputy for Albacete (since 2011)
- José Antonio Monago, President of the PP of Extremadura (since 2008) and former President of the Regional Government of Extremadura (2011–2015)
- Dolors Montserrat, Deputy for Barcelona (since 2008) and former Minister of Health, Social Services and Equality (2016–2018)
- Carmen Navarro Lacoba, Deputy for Albacete (since 2016)
- José Antonio Nieto, former Mayor of Córdoba (2011–2015)
- Juan Vicente Pérez Aras, Deputy for Valencia (since 2015)
- Jesús Posada, Deputy for Soria (since 1993) former President of the Congress of Deputies (2011–2016), former Minister of Public Administrations (2000–2002), former Minister of Agriculture, Fisheries and Food (1999–2000) and former President of the Junta of Castile and León (1989–1991)
- Carmen Quintanilla, Deputy for Ciudad Real (since 2000)
- Pedro Rollán, Vice President of the Community of Madrid (since 2018)
- Rosa Romero, Deputy for Ciudad Real (2000–2003 and since 2011) and former Mayor of Ciudad Real (2007–2015)
- Alicia Sánchez-Camacho, Deputy for Barcelona (since 2016) and former President of the PP of Catalonia (2008–2017)
- César Sánchez, President of the Provincial Deputation of Alicante (since 2015)
- Ricardo Tarno, Deputy for Seville (since 2008)
- María Torres, Deputy for Jaén (since 2017)
- Vicente Tirado, Secretary-General of the PP of Castilla–La Mancha (since 2006)
- Silvia Valmaña Ochaíta, Deputy for Guadalajara (since 2016)
- Juan Jesús Vivas, Mayor-President of Ceuta (since 2001)
- Juan Ignacio Zoido, Deputy for Seville (since 2016) and former Minister of the Interior (2016–2018)

==== José Ramón García-Hernández ====
José Ramón García-Hernández's endorsements, prior to his elimination in the first ballot; endorsed Pablo Casado
- Jorge Fernández Díaz, Deputy for Barcelona (since 1989) and former Minister of the Interior (2011–2016)
- Tomás Iribarren, former Member of the Parliament of Galicia for Pontevedra (1989–1996)

==== José Manuel García-Margallo ====
José Manuel García-Margallo's endorsements, prior to his elimination in the first ballot; endorsed Pablo Casado
- Luis Asúa, former Deputy Minister of Environment and Territorial Planning of the Community of Madrid (2012–2013)

==== Soraya Sáenz de Santamaría ====
Soraya Sáenz de Santamaría's endorsements
- Dolores Alba Mullor, Deputy for Alicante (since 2016)
- Alfonso Alonso, President of the PP of the Basque Country (since 2015), former Minister of Health, Social Services and Equality (2014–2016) and former Mayor of Vitoria (1999–2007)
- Ana Alós, Deputy for Huesca (since 2016) and former Mayor of Huesca (2011–2015)
- Asier Antona, President of the PP of the Canary Islands (since 2016)
- Javier Arenas, Senator appointed by the Parliament of Andalusia (since 2008), former Second Deputy Prime Minister (2003–2004) and President of the PP of Andalusia (1993–1996 and 2004–2012)
- José Luis Ayllón, Deputy for Madrid (since 2016) and former Secretary of State for Relations with the Cortes (2011–2018)
- Belén Bajo, Deputy for Madrid (since 2011)
- José Manuel Baltar, President of the Provincial Deputation of Ourense (since 2012)
- Fátima Báñez, Deputy for Huelva (since 2000) and former Minister of Employment and Social Security (2011–2018)
- Manuel Barón, Mayor of Antequera (since 2011)
- Miguel Barrachina, Deputy for Castellón (2004–2011 and since 2016) and President of the PP of Castellón (since 2017)
- Edelmira Barreira, Senator for Ourense (since 2016)
- José Manuel Barreiro, PP Spokesperson in the Senate (since 2011)
- Elena Bastidas, Deputy for Valencia (since 2016) and Deputy Secretary-General of the PP of the Valencian Community (since 2015)
- Elías Bendodo, President of the Provincial Deputation of Málaga (since 2011)
- Roberto Bermúdez de Castro, former Secretary of State for Territorial Administrations (2016–2018)
- María del Mar Blanco, Deputy for Madrid (since 2016)
- Isabel Bonig, President of the PP of the Valencian Community (since 2015)
- Emilio Bravo Peña, Mayor of Mora (since 2011) and Secretary-General of the PP of Toledo (since 2017)
- Jesús Julio Carnero, President of the Provincial Deputation of Valladolid (since 2011) and President of the PP of Valladolid (since 2017)
- Loreto Cascales Martínez, Deputy for Alicante (since 2016)
- José Císcar, President of the PP of Alicante (since 2012) and Deputy for Alicante in the Corts Valencianes (since 2007)
- Óscar Clavell López, Deputy for Castellón (since 2016) and former Mayor of La Vall d'Uixó (2011–2015)
- Mar Cotelo, Deputy for La Rioja (since 2016)
- Avelino de Barrionuevo, Deputy for Málaga (since 2016)
- Íñigo de la Serna, former Minister of Development (2016–2018) and former Mayor of Santander (2007–2016)
- Emilio del Río Sanz, Deputy for La Rioja (since 2016)
- Rocío Díaz Jiménez, PP Spokesperson in the City Council of Granada (since 2016)
- Carolina España, Deputy for Málaga (since 2011)
- Carmen Fúnez, Senator for Ciudad Real (since 2004)
- Cuca Gamarra, Mayor of Logroño (since 2011)
- María José García-Pelayo, former Mayor of Jerez de la Frontera (2003–2005 and 2011–2015) (previously endorsed María Dolores de Cospedal)
- Mercedes Fernández, President of the PP of Asturias (since 2012) (previously endorsed María Dolores de Cospedal)
- Arturo García-Tizón, Deputy for Toledo (1982–1989 and since 2008) and former Secretary-General of AP (1987–1989) (previously endorsed María Dolores de Cospedal)
- José María Gil-Robles y Gil-Delgado, former President of the European Parliament (1997–1999)
- Manuel Andrés González, President of the PP of Huelva (since 2008), former Mayor of Lepe (2003–2013)
- Agustín Iglesias Caunedo, former Mayor of Oviedo (2012–2015)
- Gema Igual, Mayor of Santander (since 2016)
- Juan José Imbroda, Mayor-President of Melilla (since 2000)
- Carlos Iturgaiz, Member of the European Parliament (since 2004), former President of the PP of the Basque Country (1996–2004)
- Pilar Marcos Domínguez, Deputy for Madrid (2012–2015 and since 2017)
- Teófila Martínez, Deputy for Cádiz (since 1989) and former Mayor of Cádiz (1995–2015)
- Íñigo Méndez de Vigo, Deputy for Palencia (since 2016) and former Minister of Education, Culture and Sport (2015–2018)
- Rafael Merino, Deputy for Córdoba (2000–2002 and since 2004) and former Mayor of Córdoba (1995–1999)
- Enric Millo, former Government's Delegate in Catalonia (2016–2018)
- Javier Moliner, President of the Provincial Deputation of Castellón (since 2011)
- Cristóbal Montoro, Deputy for Seville (since 2008) and former Minister of the Treasury (2000–2004 and 2011–2018)
- Juanma Moreno, President of the PP of Andalusia (since 2014).
- Rubén Moreno Palanques, Deputy for Valencia (since 2016)
- Ángeles Muñoz, Mayor of Marbella (2007–2015 and since 2017)
- Álvaro Nadal, Deputy for Madrid (since 2016) and former Minister of Energy, Tourism and Digital Agenda (2016–2018)
- Elena Nevado, Mayor of Cáceres (since 2011)
- Marcelino Oreja Aguirre, former Minister of Foreign Affairs (1976–1980)
- Eva Ortiz, Secretary-General of the PP of the Valencian Community (since 2015)
- Iñaki Oyarzabal, Senator for Álava (since 2016) and Secretary of Justice, Rights and Freedoms of the PP (since 2012)
- Virginia Pérez, President of the PP of Seville (since 2017)
- Jorge Pumar, Vice President of the Provincial Deputation of Ourense (since 2012)
- Carlos Rojas García, Deputy for Granada (since 2016) and former Mayor of Motril (2003–2004 and 2007–2012)
- Pilar Rojo, Deputy for Pontevedra (since 2016) and former President of the Parliament of Galicia (2009–2016)
- Pedro Rollán, Vice President of the Community of Madrid (since 2018) (previously endorsed María Dolores de Cospedal)
- Carmelo Romero, Deputy for Huelva (since 2011)
- Alicia Sánchez-Camacho, Deputy for Barcelona (since 2016) and former President of the PP of Catalonia (2008–2017) (previously endorsed María Dolores de Cospedal)
- Miguel Ángel Santalices, President of the Parliament of Galicia (since 2016)
- Antonio Sanz Cabello, President of the PP of Cádiz (1996–1999, 2004–2006 and since 2012) and former Government's Delegate in Andalusia (2015–2018)
- María José Sáenz de Buruaga, President of the PP of Cantabria (since 2017) and former Vice President of Cantabria (2011–2015)
- Borja Sémper, President of the PP of Gipuzkoa (since 2009)
- Isabel Tocino, former Minister of Environment (1996–2000)
- Celia Villalobos, Deputy for Málaga (since 1989), former First Vice President of the Congress of Deputies (2011–2016), former Minister of Health and Consumption (2000–2002) and former Mayor of Málaga (1995–2000)
- Juan Jesús Vivas, Mayor-President of Ceuta (since 2001) (previously endorsed María Dolores de Cospedal)

== Opinion polls ==
Poll results are listed in the tables below in reverse chronological order, showing the most recent first, and using the date the survey's fieldwork was done, as opposed to the date of publication. If such date is unknown, the date of publication is given instead. The highest percentage figure in each polling survey is displayed in bold, and the background shaded in the candidate's colour. In the instance of a tie, the figures with the highest percentages are shaded. Polls show data gathered among PP voters/supporters as well as Spanish voters as a whole, but not among party members, who were the ones ultimately entitled to vote in the primary election.

=== PP voters ===
Polling firm/Commissioner	Fieldwork date	Sample size													Other /None	Question	Lead
Polling firm/Commissioner	Fieldwork date	Sample size	Casado	Sáenz de Santamaría	Cospedal	Hernández	Margallo	Cabanes	Bayo	Feijóo	Pastor	De la Serna	Alonso	Cifuentes	Other /None	Question	Lead
**Congress election**	21 Jul 2018	—N/a (Note: PP delegates.)	**57.3**	42.1	–	–	–	–	–	–	–	–	–	–	0.6	—N/a	15.2
Demoscopia Servicios/OKDiario	20 Jul 2018	566 (Note: PP councillors.)	**49.5**	35.7	–	–	–	–	–	–	–	–	–	–	–	14.8	13.8
NC Report/La Razón	8–14 Jul 2018	600	42.5	**42.8**	–	–	–	–	–	–	–	–	–	–	–	14.7	0.3
Sigma Dos/El Mundo	9–12 Jul 2018	?	29.7	**56.9**	–	–	–	–	–	–	–	–	–	–	–	13.4	27.2
ElectoPanel/Electomanía	5–10 Jul 2018	?	48.8	**51.2**	–	–	–	–	–	–	–	–	–	–	–	–	2.4
**Primary election**	5 Jul 2018	—N/a (Note: PP members.)	34.3	**36.9**	25.9	1.2	1.2	0.3	–	–	–	–	–	–	0.2	—N/a	2.6
Demoscopia Servicios/OKDiario	28 Jun–2 Jul 2018	447	16.8	16.3	**18.8**	0.4	1.8	0.2	–	–	–	–	–	–	4.3	41.4	2.0
IMOP/El Confidencial	22–27 Jun 2018	500	22.2	**45.2**	11.9	1.2	6.4	0.1	–	–	–	–	–	–	12.9		23.0
Demoscopia Servicios/OKDiario	22–24 Jun 2018	330	**16.7**	14.5	15.2	0.3	2.4	0.0	–	–	–	–	–	–	4.8	46.1	1.5
SocioMétrica/El Español	19–22 Jun 2018	? (Note: Current PP voters.)	–	**52.6**	31.2	–	–	–	–	–	–	–	–	–	–	16.2	21.4
SocioMétrica/El Español	19–22 Jun 2018	?	22.8	**47.8**	16.2	2.3	4.0	–	0.0	–	–	–	–	–	–	6.9	25.0
SocioMétrica/El Español	19–22 Jun 2018	? (Note: PP voters in 2016.)	–	**52.5**	38.2	–	–	–	–	–	–	–	–	–	–	9.3	14.3
SocioMétrica/El Español	19–22 Jun 2018	?	18.6	**49.3**	12.0	3.5	9.2	–	0.0	–	–	–	–	–	–	7.3	30.7
GESOP/El Periódico	11–13 Jun 2018	163	–	27.0	8.6	–	–	–	–	**33.1**	14.1	6.1	–	–	0.6	10.4	6.1
DYM/El Independiente	11–12 Jun 2018	?	–	33.1	5.7	–	–	–	–	**37.3**	11.5	–	–	–	7.0	5.4	4.2
GAD3/ABC	7–8 Jun 2018	?	4.1	23.1	7.6	–	–	–	–	**37.0**	5.8	–	–	–	22.4		13.9
InvyMark/laSexta	4–8 Jun 2018	?	–	**43.2**	7.1	–	–	–	–	30.3	7.9	2.5	–	–	–	9.0	12.9
MyWord/Cadena SER	6–7 Jun 2018	?	–	38.0	6.0	–	–	–	–	**39.0**	3.8	–	1.6	–	0.4	11.2	1.0
ElectoPanel/Electomanía	26–28 May 2018	?	7.4	**44.4**	1.9	–	1.9	–	–	35.2	5.6	–	0.0	–	3.6	0.0	9.2
NC Report/La Razón	3–6 Apr 2018	350	–	**27.7**	20.3	–	–	–	–	26.9	10.6	–	–	0.6	3.7	10.3	0.8
SocioMétrica/El Español	19–29 Mar 2018	?	6.0	**40.0**	3.0	–	–	–	–	24.0	–	–	–	10.0	10.0	7.0	16.0

=== Spanish voters ===
Polling firm/Commissioner	Fieldwork date	Sample size												Other /None	Question	Lead
Polling firm/Commissioner	Fieldwork date	Sample size	Casado	Sáenz de Santamaría	Cospedal	Hernández	Margallo	Bayo	Feijóo	Pastor	De la Serna	Alonso	Cifuentes	Other /None	Question	Lead
YouGov/El Huffington Post	10–12 Jul 2018	1,005	22.0	**30.0**	–	–	–	–	–	–	–	–	–	–	48.0	8.0
Sigma Dos/El Mundo	9–12 Jul 2018	1,000	27.3	**44.2**	–	–	–	–	–	–	–	–	–	–	28.5	16.9
ElectoPanel/Electomanía	5–10 Jul 2018	882	40.1	**59.9**	–	–	–	–	–	–	–	–	–	–	–	19.8
SocioMétrica/El Español	19–22 Jun 2018	1,000	–	**34.9**	29.0	–	–	–	–	–	–	–	–	–	36.1	5.9
SocioMétrica/El Español	19–22 Jun 2018	1,000	9.6	**32.4**	10.8	1.3	10.4	0.4	–	–	–	–	–	–	35.1	21.6
GESOP/El Periódico	11–13 Jun 2018	800	–	**27.5**	5.8	–	–	–	20.4	11.6	6.0	–	–	0.3	28.6	7.1
DYM/El Independiente	11–12 Jun 2018	1,019	–	**24.9**	5.7	–	–	–	19.5	11.7	–	–	–	26.3	11.9	5.4
YouGov/La Vanguardia	8–11 Jun 2018	1,004	–	**26.0**	4.0	–	–	–	18.0	7.0	3.0	–	–	12.0	31.0	8.0
GAD3/ABC	7–8 Jun 2018	800	3.2	20.3	4.4	–	–	–	**22.0**	8.4	–	–	–	41.7		1.7
InvyMark/laSexta	4–8 Jun 2018	?	–	23.1	5.4	–	–	–	**26.8**	11.5	4.5	–	–	–	28.7	3.7
Top Position	4–7 Jun 2018	1,200	–	**33.4**	–	–	–	–	31.6	–	–	–	–	35.0		1.8
MyWord/Cadena SER	6–7 Jun 2018	1,215	–	**23.5**	5.1	–	–	–	22.8	7.7	–	2.8	–	4.7	33.4	0.7
ElectoPanel/Electomanía	26–28 May 2018	1,425	4.2	**32.2**	2.1	–	5.3	–	17.9	7.5	–	0.7	–	13.4	16.7	14.3
SocioMétrica/El Español	19–29 Mar 2018	1,000	2.0	**18.0**	2.0	–	–	–	9.0	–	–	–	6.0	21.0	42.0	9.0

== Delegate estimations ==
Source	Fieldwork date	Sample size	Delegates				Percentage			
Source	Fieldwork date	Sample size				Other /None /Unknown				Other /None /Unknown
Source	Fieldwork date	Sample size	Casado	Santamaría	Cospedal	Other /None /Unknown	Casado	Santamaría	Cospedal	Other /None /Unknown
Congress election	21 Jul 2018	3,082	1,701	1,250	–	131	55.2	40.6	–	4.3
Demoscopia Servicios/OKDiario	20 Jul 2018	3,082	1,751	1,331	–	–	56.8	43.2	–	–
Casado's campaign	20 Jul 2018	3,082	2,198	777	–	107	71.3	25.2	–	3.5
Santamaría's campaign	20 Jul 2018	3,082	?	1,950	–	?	?	63.0	–	?
Casado's campaign	17 Jul 2018	3,082	2,100	836	–	146	68.1	27.1	–	4.7
Santamaría's campaign	17 Jul 2018	3,082	<1,350	1,850	–	?	<45.0	60.0	–	?
Casado's campaign	12 Jul 2018	3,082	2,156	800	–	126	70.0	26.0	–	4.0
Electomanía	7 Jul 2018	2,718 (Note: Partial count.)	672	1,196	850	–	24.7	44.0	31.3	–
El Español	7 Jul 2018	2,615	882	1,008	725	–	33.7	38.5	27.7	–
ABC	6 Jul 2018	2,612	684	1,369	559	–	26.2	52.4	21.4	–
El País	6 Jul 2018	2,503	645	1,149	709	–	25.8	45.9	28.3	–

== Results ==
=== Primary ===
==== Overall ====
Summary of the 5 July 2018 PP primary results
Candidate	Votes	%
Soraya Sáenz de Santamaría	21,512	36.95
Pablo Casado	19,954	34.27
María Dolores de Cospedal	15,092	25.92
José Manuel García-Margallo	688	1.18
José Ramón García Hernández	671	1.15
Elio Cabanes	185	0.32
Blank ballots	119	0.20
Total	58,221	
Valid votes	58,221	99.86
Invalid votes	83	0.14
Votes cast / turnout	58,304	86.91
Abstentions	8,779	13.09
Registered members	67,083	

Vote by party members
Santamaría	36.95%
Casado	34.27%
Cospedal	25.92%
García-Margallo	1.18%
G. Hernández	1.15%
Cabanes	0.32%
Blank ballots	0.20%

==== By region ====
Region	Electorate	Turnout	Soraya Sáenz de Santamaría		Pablo Casado		María Dolores de Cospedal		José Manuel García-Margallo		José Ramón García Hernández		Elio Cabanes	
Region	Electorate	Turnout	Votes	%	Votes	%	Votes	%	Votes	%	Votes	%	Votes	%
Andalusia	11,835	86.66	5,581	54.48	1,663	16.23	2,907	28.37	60	0.59	31	0.30	3	0.03
Aragon	2,105	86.79	419	23.09	712	39.23	654	36.03	5	0.28	23	1.27	2	0.11
Asturias	2,189	82.87	529	29.23	368	20.33	893	49.34	15	0.83	4	0.22	1	0.06
Balearic Islands	2,826	83.33	770	32.72	1,102	46.83	426	18.10	43	1.83	9	0.38	3	0.13
Basque Country	595	94.79	312	56.12	124	22.30	100	17.99	13	2.34	7	1.26	0	0.00
Canary Islands	2,329	88.11	1,138	55.54	447	21.82	433	21.13	23	1.12	6	0.29	2	0.10
Cantabria	1,465	95.84	752	53.79	412	29.47	213	15.24	11	0.79	8	0.57	2	0.14
Castile and León	6,794	84.13	2,859	50.18	2,049	35.96	566	9.93	46	0.81	169	2.97	9	0.16
Castilla–La Mancha	4,976	91.00	423	9.37	1,115	24.69	2,922	64.70	31	0.69	24	0.53	1	0.02
Catalonia	1,759	84.71	296	19.99	736	49.70	371	25.05	29	1.96	48	3.24	1	0.07
Ceuta	244	86.48	12	5.71	29	13.81	167	79.52	2	0.95	0	0.00	0	0.00
Extremadura	1,626	88.99	399	27.59	511	35.34	506	34.99	18	1.24	8	0.55	4	0.28
Galicia	4,564	87.25	1,104	27.94	1,160	29.35	1,560	39.47	84	2.13	36	0.91	8	0.20
La Rioja	2,082	78.19	686	42.74	672	41.87	181	11.28	19	1.18	47	2.93	0	0.00
Madrid	9,949	82.97	1,613	19.65	4,487	54.67	1,811	22.06	137	1.67	153	1.86	7	0.09
Melilla	401	91.27	288	78.69	63	17.21	10	2.73	5	1.37	0	0.00	0	0.00
Murcia	2,180	86.28	634	33.81	1,065	56.80	133	7.09	19	1.01	11	0.59	13	0.69
Navarre	211	81.52	39	22.67	80	46.51	51	29.65	0	0.00	2	1.16	0	0.00
Valencian Community	8,953	93.33	3,658	43.82	3,159	37.85	1,188	14.23	128	1.53	85	1.02	129	1.55
Total	67,083	86.91	21,512	37.02	19,954	34.34	15,092	25.98	688	1.18	671	1.15	185	0.32

==== By constituency ====
Province	Electorate	Turnout	Soraya Sáenz de Santamaría		Pablo Casado		María Dolores de Cospedal		José Manuel García-Margallo		José Ramón García Hernández		Elio Cabanes	
Province	Electorate	Turnout	Votes	%	Votes	%	Votes	%	Votes	%	Votes	%	Votes	%
A Coruña	1,596	85.90	317	23.41	415	30.65	574	42.39	34	2.51	11	0.81	3	0.22
Álava	224	97.32	162	75.70	45	21.03	4	1.87	2	0.93	1	0.47	0	0.00
Albacete	714	96.50	30	4.37	107	15.57	547	79.62	1	0.15	2	0.29	0	0.00
Alicante	3,593	94.02	1,525	45.19	1,115	33.04	649	19.23	57	1.69	19	0.56	10	0.30
Almería	1,627	86.17	407	29.05	178	12.71	804	57.39	6	0.43	6	0.43	0	0.00
Asturias	2,189	82.87	529	29.23	368	20.33	893	49.34	15	0.83	4	0.22	1	0.06
Ávila	638	90.13	98	17.04	306	53.22	36	6.26	4	0.70	131	22.78	0	0.00
Badajoz	874	87.99	223	29.04	317	41.28	216	28.13	5	0.65	5	0.65	2	0.26
Barcelona	1,224	82.92	166	16.42	495	48.96	292	28.88	20	1.98	37	3.66	1	0.10
Biscay	283	93.64	102	39.08	61	23.37	87	33.33	7	2.68	4	1.53	0	0.00
Burgos	801	87.64	353	50.50	290	41.49	37	5.29	11	1.57	6	0.86	2	0.29
Cáceres	752	90.16	176	25.96	194	28.61	290	42.77	13	1.92	3	0.44	2	0.29
Cádiz	1,405	83.27	749	64.13	210	17.98	187	16.01	16	1.37	6	0.51	0	0.00
Cantabria	1,465	95.84	752	53.79	412	29.47	213	15.24	11	0.79	8	0.57	2	0.14
Castellón	1,893	90.33	675	39.54	917	53.72	84	4.92	18	1.05	12	0.70	1	0.06
Ceuta	244	86.48	12	5.71	29	13.81	167	79.52	2	0.95	0	0.00	0	0.00
Ciudad Real	1,069	93.64	123	12.30	343	34.30	521	52.10	7	0.70	6	0.60	0	0.00
Córdoba	876	93.95	254	30.86	236	28.68	324	39.37	2	0.24	6	0.73	1	0.12
Cuenca	788	91.50	81	11.33	111	15.52	517	72.31	4	0.56	2	0.28	0	0.00
El Hierro	95	87.37	66	79.52	16	19.28	0	0.00	1	1.20	0	0.00	0	0.00
Formentera	21	95.24	12	60.00	7	35.00	1	5.00	0	0.00	0	0.00	0	0.00
Fuerteventura	166	91.57	112	73.68	9	5.92	30	19.74	1	0.66	3	0.00	0	0.00
Gipuzkoa	88	92.05	48	59.26	18	22.22	9	11.11	4	4.94	2	2.47	0	0.00
Girona	109	92.66	72	72.73	11	11.11	13	13.13	3	3.03	0	0.00	0	0.00
Gran Canaria	814	95.09	399	51.62	185	23.93	179	23.16	9	1.16	0	0.00	1	0.13
Granada	999	95.60	388	40.71	209	21.93	337	35.36	18	1.89	0	0.00	0	1.10
Guadalajara	415	93.01	22	5.70	109	28.24	246	63.73	2	0.52	7	1.81	0	0.00
Huelva	715	97.20	598	86.04	82	11.80	15	2.16	0	0.00	0	0.00	0	0.00
Huesca	572	86.89	183	37.20	218	44.31	74	15.04	3	0.61	13	2.64	1	0.20
Ibiza	369	93.77	157	45.38	155	44.80	25	7.23	6	1.73	2	0.58	1	0.29
Jaén	841	92.15	274	35.49	155	20.08	337	43.65	3	0.39	3	0.39	0	0.00
La Gomera	42	90.48	2	5.26	5	13.16	31	81.58	0	0.00	0	0.00	0	0.00
La Palma	312	91.35	168	59.15	91	32.04	18	6.34	5	1.76	2	0.70	0	0.00
La Rioja	2,082	78.19	686	42.74	672	41.87	181	11.28	19	1.18	47	2.93	0	0.00
Lanzarote	63	92.06	25	43.86	4	7.02	26	45.61	2	3.51	0	0.00	0	0.00
León	1,030	80.87	427	51.45	283	34.10	102	12.29	8	0.96	6	0.72	4	0.48
Lleida	187	82.35	17	11.04	84	54.55	51	33.12	2	1.30	0	0.00	0	0.00
Lugo	1,383	87.71	290	24.03	396	32.81	492	40.76	25	2.07	3	0.25	1	0.08
Madrid	9,949	82.97	1,613	19.65	4,487	54.67	1,811	22.06	137	1.67	153	1.86	7	0.09
Málaga	2,048	83.59	1,223	71.48	370	21.62	107	6.25	7	0.41	4	0.23	0	0.00
Mallorca	1,975	87.65	527	30.46	808	46.71	354	20.46	32	1.85	7	0.40	2	0.12
Melilla	401	91.27	288	78.69	63	17.21	10	2.73	5	1.37	0	0.00	0	0.00
Menorca	461	55.97	74	28.79	132	51.36	46	17.90	5	1.95	0	0.00	0	0.00
Murcia	2,180	86.28	634	33.81	1,065	56.80	133	7.09	19	1.01	11	0.59	13	0.69
Navarre	211	81.52	39	22.67	80	46.51	51	29.65	0	0.00	2	1.16	0	0.00
Ourense	516	94.57	206	42.47	94	19.38	177	36.49	4	0.82	3	0.62	1	0.21
Palencia	529	91.68	188	39.00	268	55.60	19	3.94	4	0.83	3	0.62	0	0.00
Pontevedra	1,069	85.13	291	32.12	255	28.15	317	34.99	21	2.32	19	2.10	3	0.33
Salamanca	889	74.02	398	60.86	194	29.66	58	8.87	3	0.46	1	0.15	0	0.00
Segovia	295	92.54	178	65.20	66	24.18	25	9.16	2	0.73	2	0.73	0	0.00
Seville	3,324	81.95	1,688	62.01	223	8.19	796	29.24	8	0.29	6	0.22	1	0.04
Soria	413	74.58	136	44.30	127	41.37	37	12.05	4	1.30	3	0.98	0	0.00
Tarragona	239	92.05	41	18.89	146	67.28	15	6.91	4	1.84	11	5.07	0	0.00
Tenerife	837	79.09	366	55.29	137	20.69	149	22.51	5	0.76	4	0.60	1	0.15
Teruel	353	90.65	72	22.57	159	49.84	83	26.02	1	0.31	3	0.94	1	0.31
Toledo	1,990	86.98	167	9.66	445	25.75	1,091	63.14	17	0.98	7	0.41	1	0.06
Valencia	3,467	94.26	1,458	44.66	1,127	34.52	455	13.94	53	1.62	54	1.65	118	3.61
Valladolid	1,580	82.53	637	48.92	422	32.41	215	16.51	8	0.61	17	1.31	3	0.23
Zamora	619	93.38	444	77.08	93	16.15	37	6.42	2	0.35	0	0.00	0	0.00
Zaragoza	1,180	85.59	164	16.33	335	33.37	497	49.50	1	0.10	7	0.70	0	0.00
Total	67,083	86.91	21,512	37.02	19,954	34.34	15,092	25.98	688	1.18	671	1.15	185	0.32

=== Congress ===
Summary of the 21 July 2018 PP congress results
Candidate	Executive		Board	
Candidate	Votes	%	Votes	%
Pablo Casado	1,701	57.29	1,689	56.91
Soraya Sáenz de Santamaría	1,250	42.10	1,251	42.15
Blank ballots	18	0.61	28	0.94
Total	2,969		2,968	
Valid votes	2,969	99.87	2,968	99.90
Invalid votes	4	0.13	3	0.10
Votes cast / turnout	2,973	96.46	2,971	96.40
Abstentions	109	3.54	111	3.60
Total delegates	3,082		3,082	

Vote by delegates (Executive)
Casado	57.29%
Santamaría	42.10%
Blank ballots	0.61%

Vote by delegates (Board)
Casado	56.91%
Santamaría	42.15%
Blank ballots	0.94%
