= 2017 PP national party congress =

- 10−12 February 2017

3,128 delegates in the National Congress Plurality needed to win
- Opinion polls
- Turnout: 2,659 (85.0%) (executive); 2,658 (85.0%) (board)
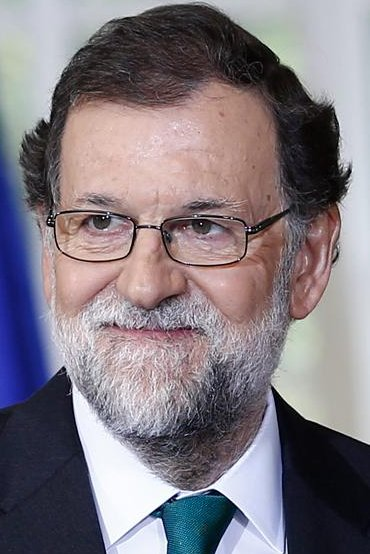

Candidate	Mariano Rajoy	Blank ballots
Delegate vote	2,530 (95.7%)	115 (4.3%)
Board	2,529 (95.8%)	112 (4.2%)
President before election
Mariano Rajoy
Elected President
Mariano Rajoy

The People's Party (PP) held its 18th national congress in Madrid from 10 to 12 February 2017, to renovate its governing bodies—including the post of president, which amounted to that of party leader—and establish the party platform and policy until the next congress. The congress was initially due for 2015, but the various elections held in Spain that year (local, regional and general) and the deadlock in the government formation negotiations leading up to the 2016 general election, as well as a major crisis over the issue within the opposition Spanish Socialist Workers' Party (PSOE), saw the event being delayed until early 2017.

The congress slogan was "Spain, forward" (Spanish: España, adelante). It was dubbed as a "quiet" congress for incumbent party president Mariano Rajoy, who was re-elected for a fourth consecutive term in office with 95.7% of the delegate vote in the congress (2,530 votes) and 4.3% of blank ballots (115). It also saw the sidelining from party leadership positions of former supporters of José María Aznar, who had grown a vocal critic of Rajoy within the party in the previous years, as well as the introduction of a primary system to elect the party president in future congresses; such system would see its first application in 2018. Other novelties included a reform of the party statutes that automatically granted to the party president the status of prime ministerial candidate in any Spanish general election held from that point onwards.

The two-year delay in the congress's calling was brought to the courts by a party member, with the Supreme Court of Spain ruling it as unlawful in December 2020, as it "violated the plaintiff's right of association, in its aspect of the right of democratic participation in the party".

== Overview ==
The congress of the PP was the party's supreme body, and could be of either ordinary or extraordinary nature, depending on whether it was held following the natural end of its term or due to any other exceptional circumstances not linked to this event. Ordinary congresses were to be held every three years and called at least two months in advance of their celebration. Extraordinary congresses had to be called by a two-thirds majority of the board of directors at least one-and-a-half month in advance of their celebration, though in cases of "exceptional urgency" this deadline could be reduced to 30 days.

The president of the PP was the party's head and the person holding the party's political and legal representation, and presided over its board of directors and executive committee, which were the party's maximum directive, governing and administration bodies between congresses. The election of the PP president was based on an indirect system, with party members voting for delegates who would, in turn, elect the president. Any party member was eligible for the post of party president, on the condition that they were up to date with the payment of party fees and that they were able to secure the signed endorsements of at least 100 party members and of 20% of congress delegates.

== Timetable ==
The key dates are listed below (all times are CET. Note that the Canary Islands use WET (UTC+0) instead):

- 14 November: Official announcement of the congress. Start of candidate submission period.
- 24 November: End of candidate submission period at 2 pm.
- 25 November: Proclamation of candidates to the party presidency.
- 26 November: Official start of internal electoral campaigning.
- 13 December: Last day of internal electoral campaigning.
- 16–19 December: Election of congress delegates.
- 10–12 February: Party congress.

== Candidates ==
Candidate	Notable positions	Announced	Ref.
=== Proclaimed ===
Candidates who met endorsement requirements and were officially proclaimed to contest the party congress.
Mariano Rajoy (age 61)	Prime Minister of Spain (since 2011); President of the PP (since 2004); Member of the Congress of Deputies for Madrid (since 2004); Leader of the Opposition of Spain (2004–2011); Secretary-General of the PP (2003–2004); Member of the Congress of Deputies for Pontevedra (1986 and 1989–2004); Spokesperson of the Government of Spain (2002–2003); Minister of the Presidency of Spain (2000–2001 and 2002–2003); First Deputy Prime Minister of Spain (2000–2003); Deputy Secretary-General of the PP (1990–2003); Minister of the Interior of Spain (2001–2002); Minister of Education and Culture of Spain (1999–2000); Minister of Public Administrations of Spain (1996–1999); President of AP/PP in the province of Pontevedra (1983–1986 and 1987–1991); Vice President of the Xunta de Galicia (1986–1987); President of the Provincial Deputation of Pontevedra (1983–1986); City Councillor of Pontevedra (1983–1986); Member of the Parliament of Galicia for Pontevedra (1981–1985); Director-General for Institutional Relations of Galicia (1982)	21 November 2016	

=== Declined ===
The individuals in this section were the subject of speculation about their possible candidacy, but publicly denied or recanted interest in running:

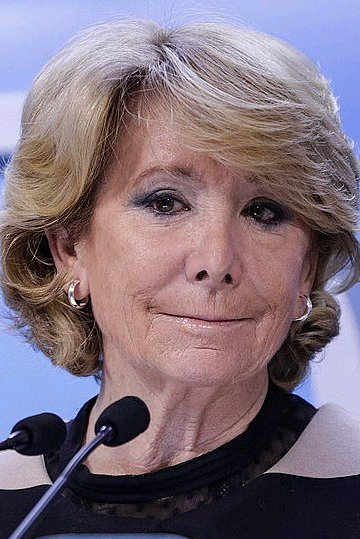
Esperanza Aguirre

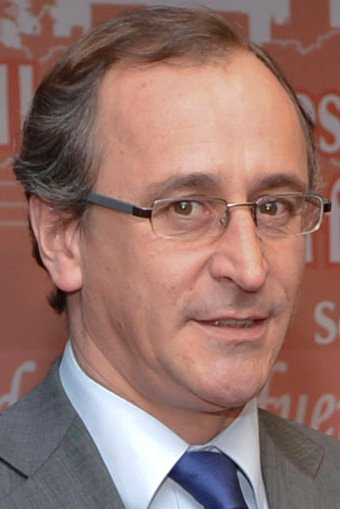
Alfonso Alonso

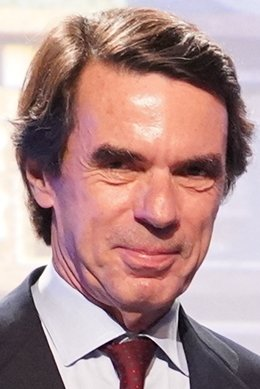
José María Aznar

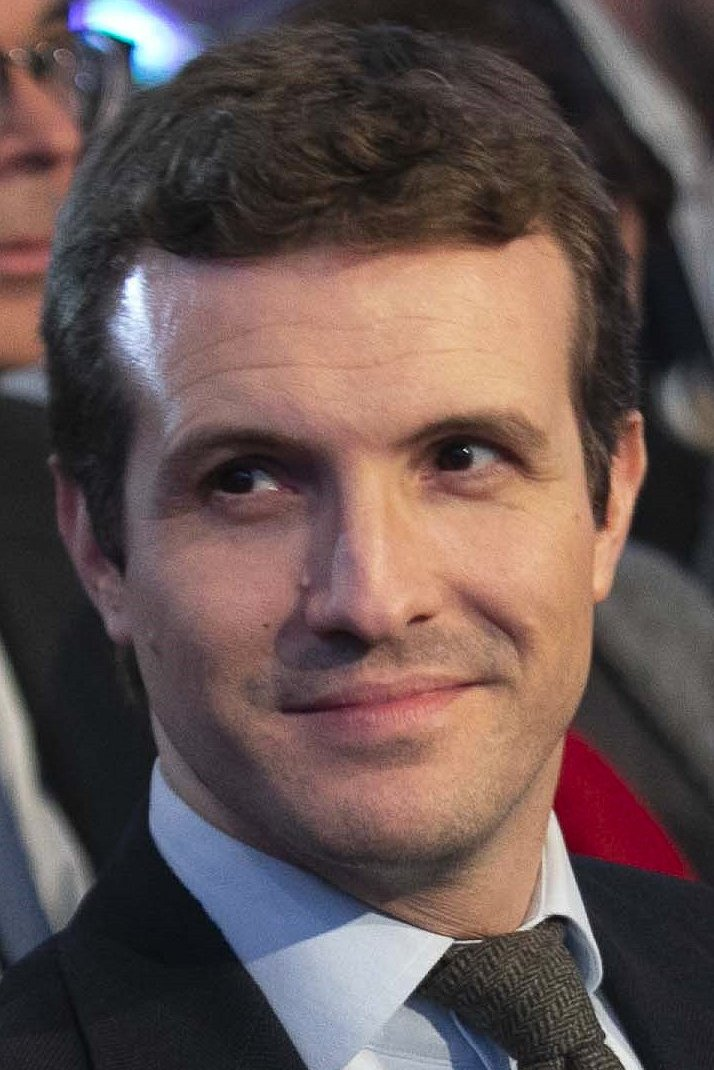
Pablo Casado

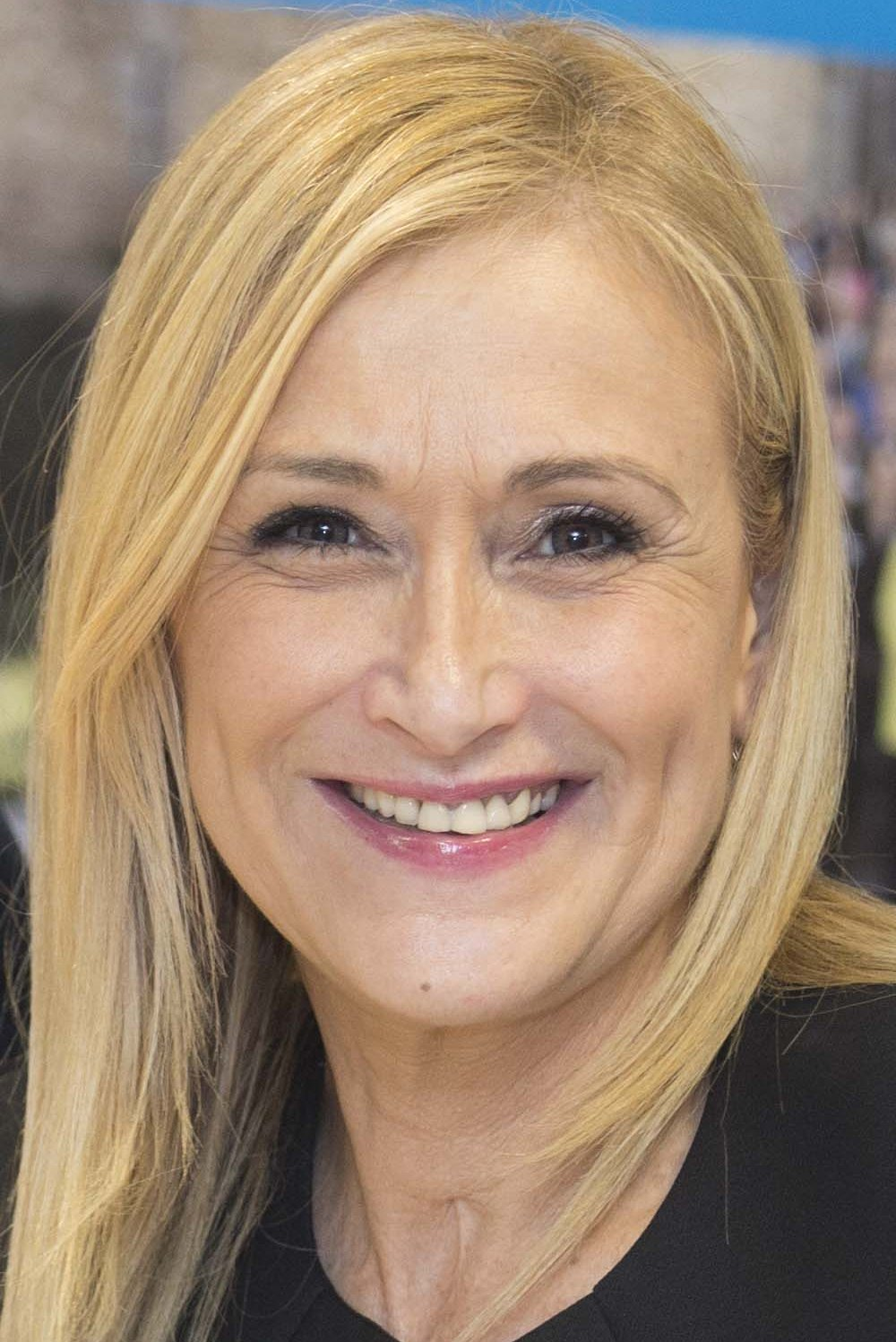
Cristina Cifuentes

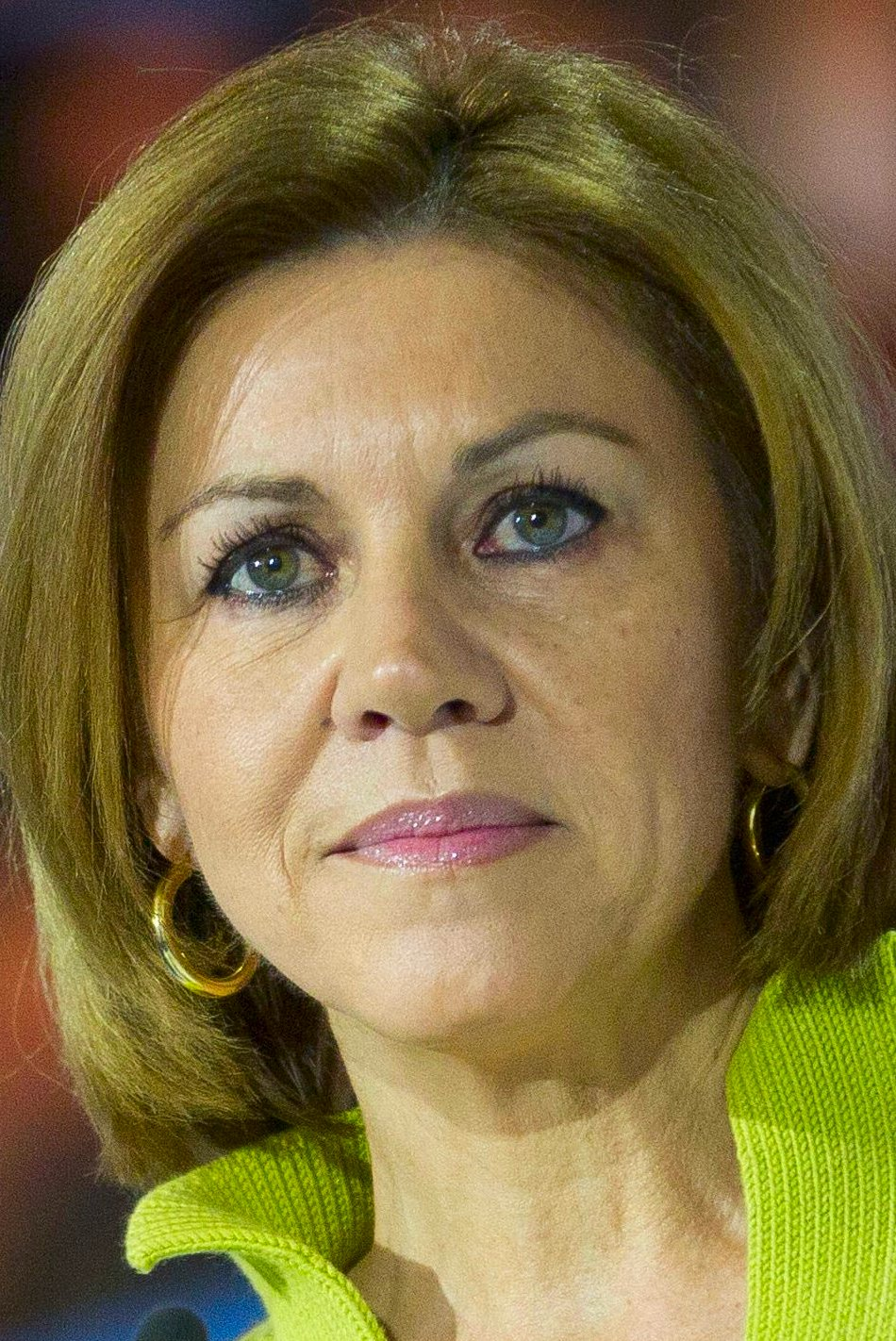
María Dolores de Cospedal
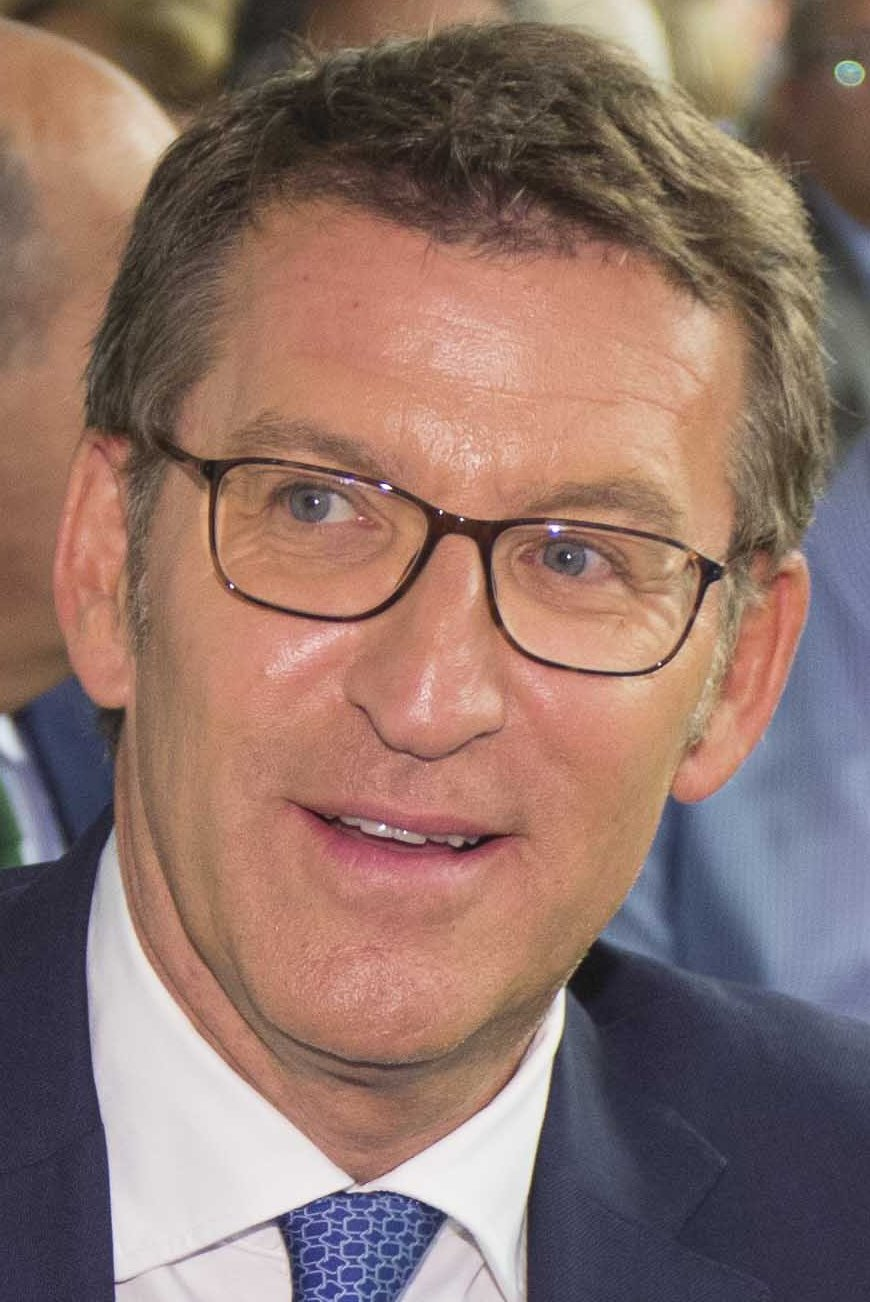
Alberto Núñez Feijóo

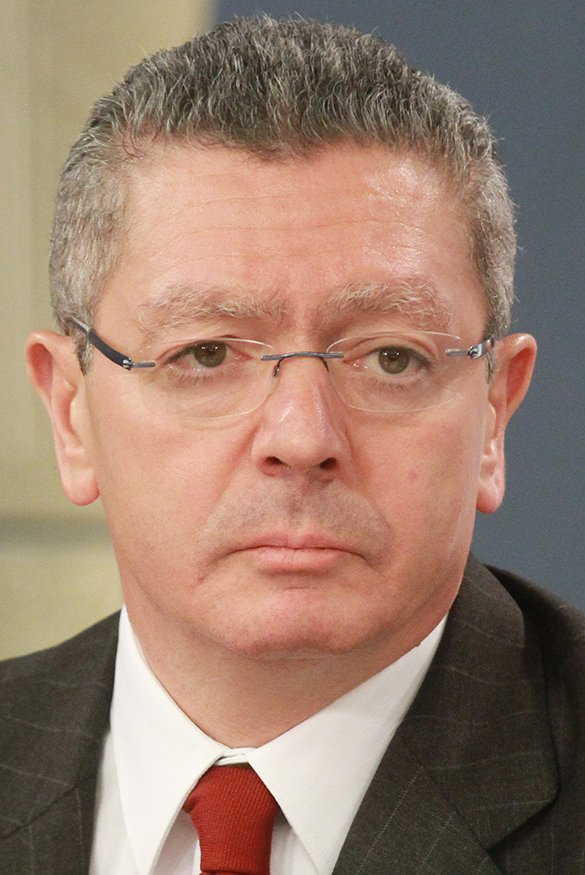
Alberto Ruiz-Gallardón

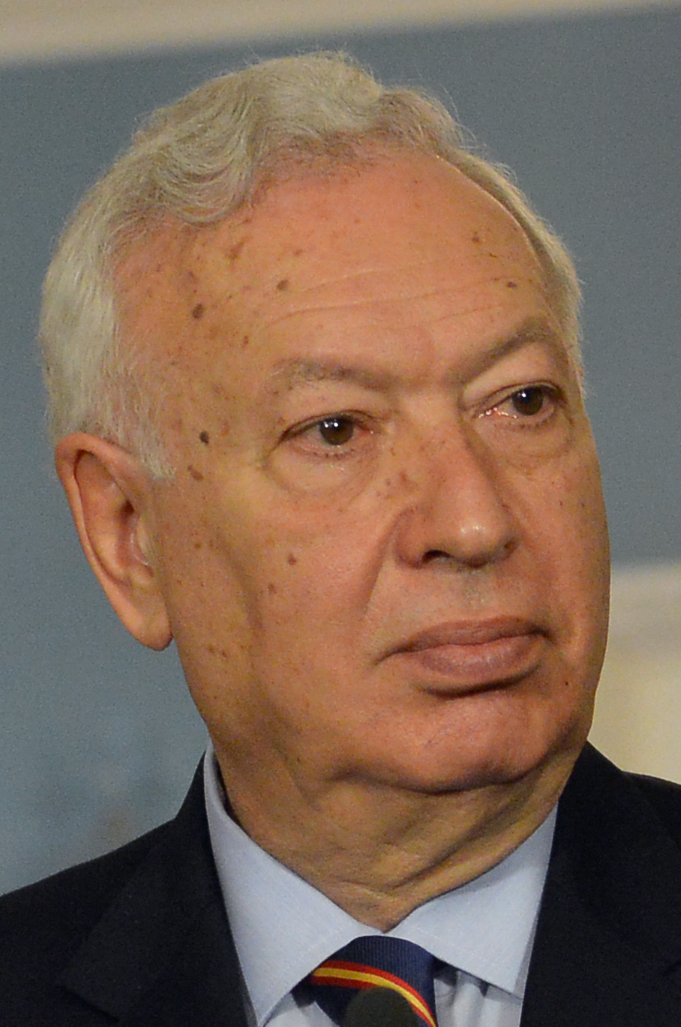
José Manuel García-Margallo

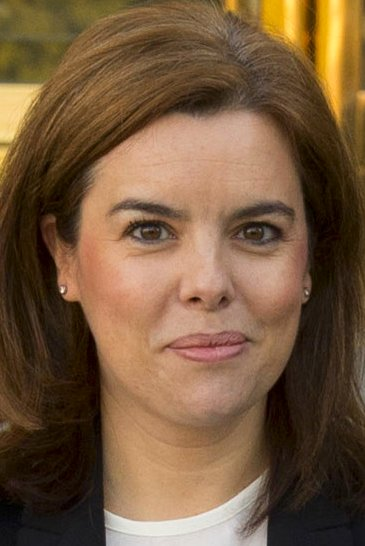
Soraya Sáenz de Santamaría

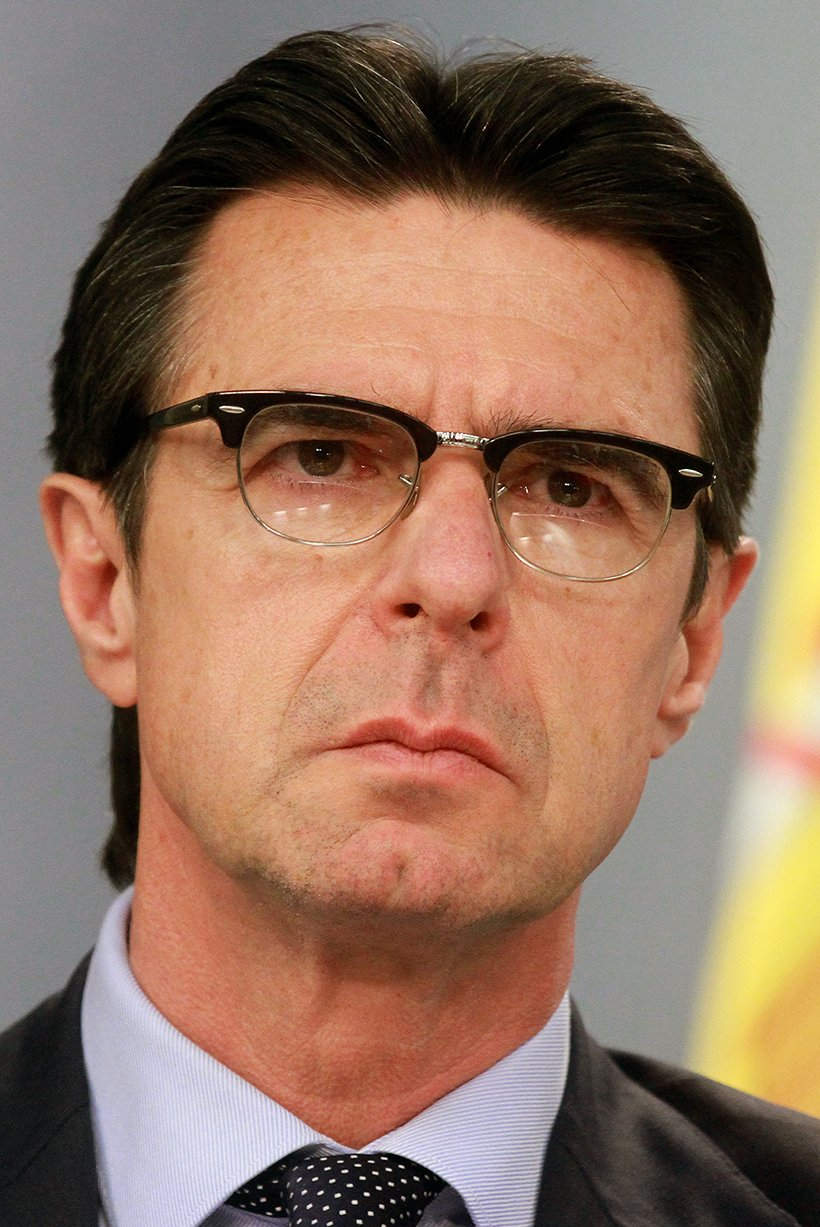
José Manuel Soria
- Esperanza Aguirre (age 65) — Spokesperson of the People's Group in Madrid (1995–1996 and since 2015); City Councillor of Madrid (1983–1996 and since 2015); President of the PP of the Community of Madrid (2004–2016); President of the Community of Madrid (2003–2012); Member of the Assembly of Madrid (2003–2012); Spokesperson of the People's Group in the Assembly of Madrid (2003); Senator for Madrid (1996–2003); President of the Senate of Spain (1999–2002); Minister of Education and Culture of Spain (1996–1999); First Deputy Mayor of Madrid (1995–1996).
- Alfonso Alonso (age 49) — Member of the Basque Parliament for Álava (since 2016); President of the PP of the Basque Country (since 2015); Minister of Health, Social Services and Equality of Spain (2014–2016); Member of the Congress of Deputies for Álava (2000–2002 and 2008–2016); Spokesperson of the People's Parliamentary Group in the Congress (2011–2014); City Councillor of Vitoria (1996–2008); Mayor of Vitoria (1999–2007).
- José María Aznar (age 63) — Prime Minister of Spain (1996–2004); President of the PP (1990–2004); Member of the Congress of Deputies for Madrid (1989–2004); President pro tempore of the Council of the European Union (2002); President of AP/PP of Castile and León (1985–1991); President of the Regional Government of Castile and León (1987–1989); Member of the Cortes of Castile and León for Ávila (1987–1989); Member of the Congress of Deputies for Ávila (1982–1987); Secretary-General of AP in La Rioja (1979–1980).
- Pablo Casado (age 36) — Deputy Secretary-General of Communication of the PP (since 2015); Member of the Congress of Deputies for Ávila (since 2011); President of NNGG in the Community of Madrid (2005–2013); Member of the Assembly of Madrid (2007–2009).
- Cristina Cifuentes (age 52) — President of the Community of Madrid (since 2015); Member of the Assembly of Madrid (1991–2012 and since 2015); President of the People's Group in the Assembly of Madrid (2015); Delegate of the Government of Spain in the Community of Madrid (2012–2015); First Vice President of the Assembly of Madrid (2005–2012); First Secretary of the Assembly of Madrid (1999–2003).
- María Dolores de Cospedal (age 51) — Secretary-General of the PP (since 2008); President of the PP of Castilla–La Mancha (since 2006); Member of the Congress of Deputies for Toledo (since 2015); Minister of Defence of Spain (2016–2018); President of the Regional Government of Castilla–La Mancha (2011–2015); Member of the Cortes of Castilla–La Mancha for Toledo (2007–2015); Senator appointed by the Cortes of Castilla–La Mancha (2006–2011); Minister of Transport and Infrastructures of the Community of Madrid (2004–2006); Secretary of State of Security of Spain (2002–2004); Undersecretary of Public Administrations of Spain (2000–2002).
- Alberto Núñez Feijóo (age 55) — President of the Xunta de Galicia (since 2009); President of the PP of Galicia (since 2006); Member of the Parliament of Galicia for Pontevedra (since 2005); First Vice President of the Xunta de Galicia (2004–2005); Minister of Territorial Policy, Public Works and Housing of Galicia (2003–2005); President of the State Society of Mail and Telegraphs (2000–2003); Secretary-General for Healthcare of Spain (1996–2000).
- Alberto Ruiz-Gallardón (age 58) — Minister of Justice of Spain (2011–2014); Member of the Congress of Deputies for Madrid (2011–2014); Mayor of Madrid (2003–2011); City Councillor of Madrid (1983–1987 and 2003–2011); President of the Community of Madrid (1995–2003); Member of the Assembly of Madrid (1987–2003); Spokesperson of the People's Parliamentary Group in the Senate (1993–1995); Senator appointed by the Assembly of Madrid (1987–1995); Spokesperson of the People's Group in the Assembly of Madrid (1987–1993); Vice President of AP (1987–1989); Secretary-General of AP (1986–1987).
- José Manuel García-Margallo (age 72) — Member of the Congress of Deputies for Alicante (since 2016); Minister of Foreign Affairs and Cooperation of Spain (2011–2016); Member of the European Parliament for Spain (1994–2011); Member of the Congress of Deputies for Valencia (1986–1994); Member of the Congress of Deputies for Melilla (1977–1982).
- Soraya Sáenz de Santamaría (age 45) — Deputy Prime Minister of Spain (since 2011); Minister of the Presidency and for Territorial Administrations of Spain (since 2016); Member of the Congress of Deputies for Madrid (since 2004); Minister of the Presidency of Spain (2011–2016); Spokesperson of the Government of Spain (2011–2016); Spokesperson of the People's Parliamentary Group in the Congress (2008–2011).
- José Manuel Soria (age 59) — Minister of Industry, Energy and Tourism of Spain (2011–2016); Member of the Congress of Deputies for Las Palmas (2011–2016); President of the PP of the Canary Islands (1999–2016); Member of the Parliament of the Canary Islands for Gran Canaria (2003–2011); Vice President of the Government of the Canary Islands (2007–2010); Minister of Economy, Employment and Finance of the Canary Islands (2007–2010); President of the Island Cabildo of Gran Canaria (2003–2007); Councillor in the Island Cabildo of Gran Canaria (2003–2007); Mayor of Las Palmas de Gran Canaria (1995 2003); City Councillor of Las Palmas de Gran Canaria (1995 2003).

== Opinion polls ==
Poll results are listed in the tables below in reverse chronological order, showing the most recent first, and using the date the survey's fieldwork was done, as opposed to the date of publication. If such date is unknown, the date of publication is given instead. The highest percentage figure in each polling survey is displayed in bold, and the background shaded in the candidate's colour. In the instance of a tie, the figures with the highest percentages are shaded.

=== PP voters ===
Polling firm/Commissioner	Fieldwork date	Sample size											Other /None	Question	Lead
Polling firm/Commissioner	Fieldwork date	Sample size	Rajoy (Inc.)	Aguirre	Sáenz de Santamaría	Casado	Cifuentes	Cospedal	Feijóo	Margallo	Aznar	Gallardón	Other /None	Question	Lead
SocioMétrica/El Español	22–29 Dec 2016	?	–	–	**41.2**	6.7	1.9	5.7	26.7	–	–	–	4.2	13.6	14.5
Sigma Dos/El Mundo	16–18 Feb 2016	?	–	–	**52.5**	5.2	12.2	–	10.8	4.2	–	–	–	15.1	37.4
TNS Demoscopia	14–21 Nov 2013	?	10.5	**31.1**	8.4	–	–	4.3	5.5	–	13.3	5.0	12.0	9.9	17.8
Intercampo/GETS (Note: "La izquierda se convierte en la fuerza electoral potencialmente mayoritaria en España" (PDF). Fundación Sistema (in Spanish). 14 October 2013. Archived from the original on 5 November 2013.)	16 Sep–14 Oct 2013	?	**32.9**	14.3	6.2	–	–	3.3	1.4	–	11.9	6.7	13.4	10.0	18.6
TNS Demoscopia	29–31 Jul 2013	?	8.5	**37.0**	7.1	–	–	1.9	4.3	–	16.2	8.4	9.3	7.3	20.8

=== Spanish voters ===
Polling firm/Commissioner	Fieldwork date	Sample size											Other /None	Question	Lead
Polling firm/Commissioner	Fieldwork date	Sample size	Rajoy (Inc.)	Aguirre	Sáenz de Santamaría	Casado	Cifuentes	Cospedal	Feijóo	Margallo	Aznar	Gallardón	Other /None	Question	Lead
SocioMétrica/El Español	22–29 Dec 2016	800	–	–	**33.2**	4.3	11.0	2.4	8.9	–	–	–	12.5	27.7	22.2
Sigma Dos/El Mundo	16–18 Feb 2016	1,000	–	–	**33.6**	5.1	14.6	–	8.2	2.5	–	–	–	36.0	19.0
TNS Demoscopia	14–21 Nov 2013	?	4.4	**13.1**	8.9	–	–	2.9	4.2	–	5.7	4.4	30.7	25.7	4.2
TNS Demoscopia	29–31 Jul 2013	?	3.6	**15.8**	7.6	–	–	1.1	3.3	–	6.9	7.9	27.5	26.3	7.9

== Results ==
Summary of the 11 February 2017 PP congress results
Candidate	Executive		Board	
Candidate	Votes	%	Votes	%
Mariano Rajoy	2,530	95.65	2,529	95.76
Blank ballots	115	4.35	112	4.24
Total	2,645		2,641	
Valid votes	2,645	99.47	2,641	99.36
Invalid votes	14	0.53	17	0.64
Votes cast / turnout	2,659	85.01	2,658	84.97
Abstentions	469	14.99	470	15.03
Total delegates	3,128		3,128	

Vote by delegates (Executive)
Rajoy	95.65%
Blank ballots	4.35%

Vote by delegates (Board)
Rajoy	95.76%
Blank ballots	4.24%
