= Valentina Martínez =

Valentina Martínez may refer to:

- Valentina Martínez Ferro, Spanish politician
- Valentina Martínez (model), Venezuelan model
