= Joint Congress-Senate Committee on National Security =

The Joint Congress-Senate Committee on National Security (Spanish: Comisión Mixta Congreso-Senado de Seguridad Nacional) is a parliamentary committee of the Spanish Cortes Generales formed by members of the Congress of Deputies and the Senate. It was constituted during the brief 11th term of the Cortes Generales, on provision of the Law of National Security, passed in 2015 during the previous legislative term. The committee composition was passed on 17 February 2016 and celebrated its inaugural session on 24 February. It is headquartered at the seat of the Congress of Deputies, and its internal rulings are those of the Lower House.

== Presidents ==
Legislators chairing the committee:

11th term

- María Dolores de Cospedal (24 February 2016 – 3 May 2016)

12th term

- José Manuel García-Margallo (16 November 2016 – 5 March 2019)

13th term

- Vicente Tirado Ochoa (since 30 July 2019)
