= Julio Millán =

Spanish politician (born 1977)

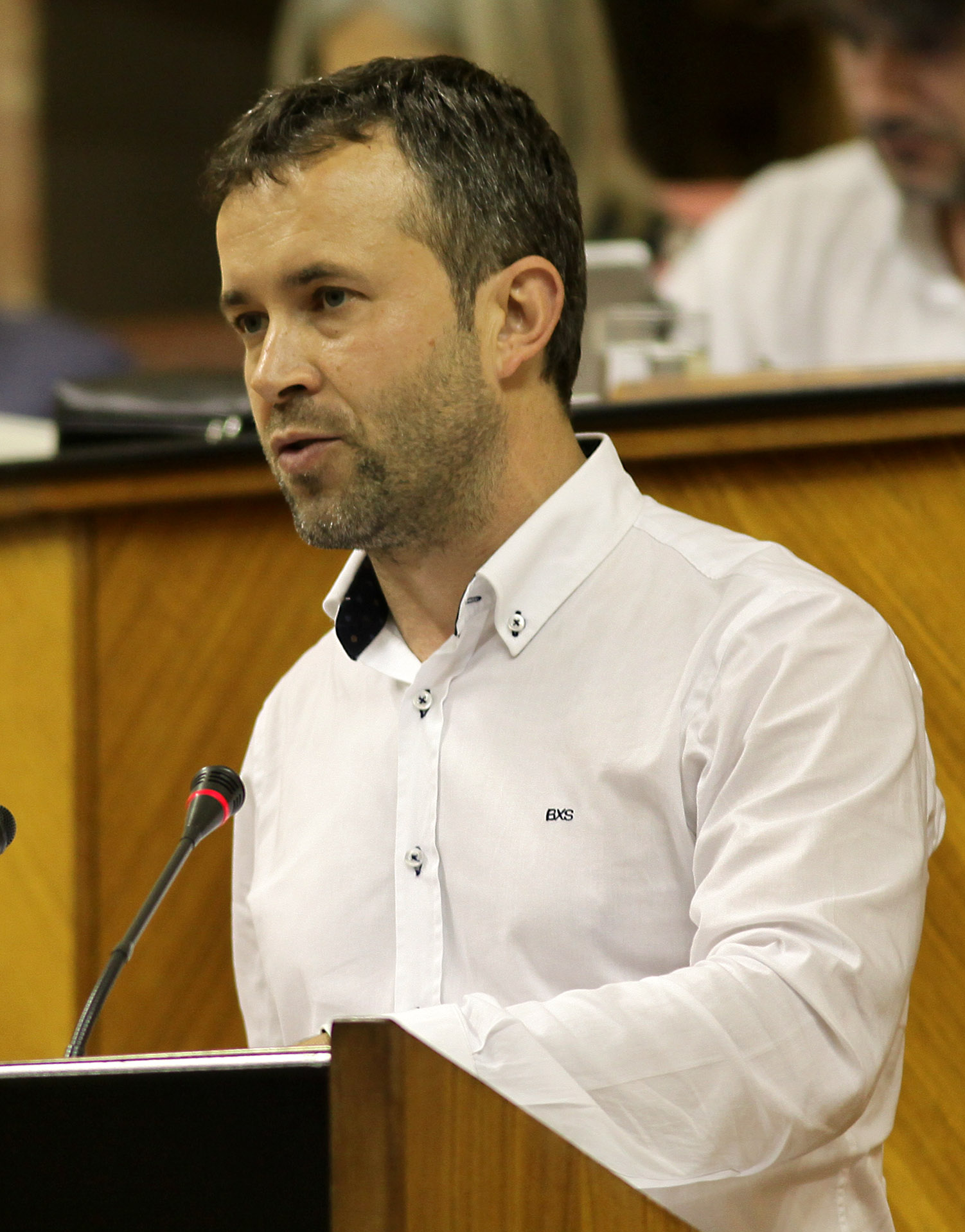
- Millán in 2018

Mayor of Jaén
- Incumbent
- Assumed office 2 January 2025
- Preceded by: Agustín González Romo
- In office 15 June 2019 – 17 June 2023
- Preceded by: Francisco Javier Márquez Sánchez
- Succeeded by: Agustín González Romo

Personal details
- Born: 11 April 1977 (age 49)
- Party: Spanish Socialist Workers' Party

Julio Millán Muñoz (born 11 April 1977) is a Spanish politician. He has served as mayor of Jaén since 2025, having previously served from 2019 to 2023. From 2015 to 2018, he was a member of the Parliament of Andalusia.
