= María Dolores de Cospedal =

Spanish politician (born 1965)

The Most Excellent María Dolores de Cospedal
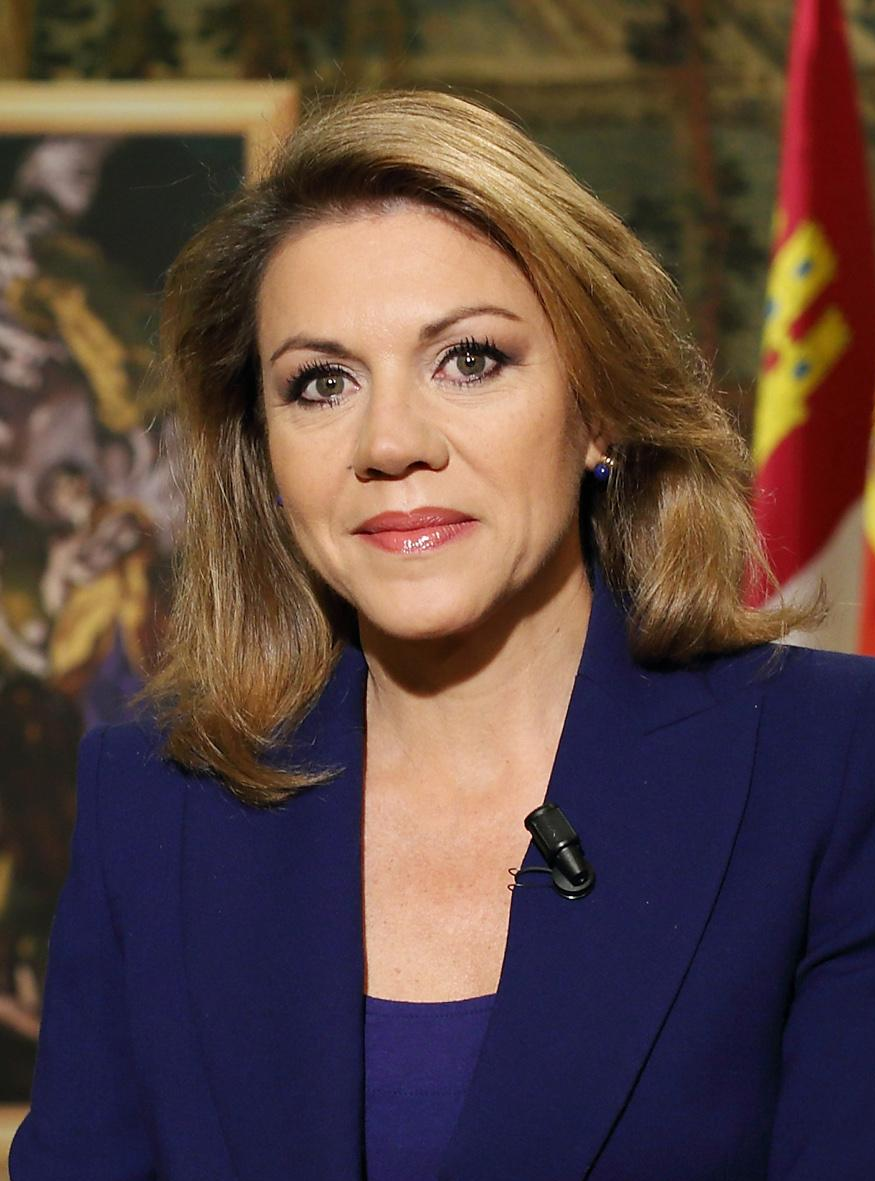

Minister of Defence
- In office 4 November 2016 – 1 June 2018
- Monarch: Felipe VI
- Prime Minister: Mariano Rajoy
- Preceded by: Pedro Morenés
- Succeeded by: Margarita Robles

Secretary-General of the People's Party
- In office 21 June 2008 – 21 July 2018
- Preceded by: Ángel Acebes
- Succeeded by: Teodoro García Egea

3rd President of Castile-La Mancha
- In office 22 June 2011 – 1 July 2015
- Monarchs: Juan Carlos I Felipe VI
- Preceded by: José María Barreda
- Succeeded by: Emiliano García-Page

Member of the Congress of Deputies
- In office 12 January 2016 – 7 November 2018

Member of the Senate
- In office 12 September 2006 – 22 June 2011

Personal details
- Born: María Dolores Cospedal García; 13 December 1965 (age 60) Madrid, Spain
- Party: PP (since 1999)
- Other political affiliations: PRD (before 1986)
- Spouse: Ignacio López del Hierro (m. 2009)
- Children: Ricardo
- Education: CEU San Pablo University
- Occupation: Politician, state lawyer

María Dolores Cospedal García (born 13 December 1965) is a Spanish politician. A member of the People's Party (PP), she served as President of Castile-La Mancha from 2011 to 2015 and as Minister of Defence of the Government of Spain from 2016 to 2018. She also was the PP's Secretary-General, second to party president Mariano Rajoy, from 2008 to 2018.

== Biography ==
=== Early life ===
Born on 13 December 1965 in Madrid, Cospedal was however chiefly raised in Albacete, studying in the later city's Colegio La Anunciata de Nuestra Señora del Rosario and in the Sabuco High School. She moved to Madrid to go to college and, after earning a licentiate degree in Law at the CEU San Pablo University, she passed the competitive public examinations to join the State Lawyers Corps in 1991, serving in this body of top civil servants until 1996.

Cospedal married aristocrat José Félix Valdivieso-González y Bravo de la Laguna in 1995; the marriage ended three years later, in 1998, when it was nullified by the Church. At a certain point she started calling herself "de Cospedal" in public which sounded more aristocratic but more recently she reverted to plain "Cospedal".

She affiliated to the People's Party (PP) in 1999.

Following the 2000 general election, she was appointed to the post of Under-Secretary of State for Public Administrations and Territorial Policy. After roughly 2 years in office, she was appointed Secretary of State of Security in the Ministry of the Interior, then led by Ángel Acebes. In December 2004, Esperanza Aguirre the president of the Madrid region, appointed Cospedal as the new minister for Transports and Infrastructures in the Regional Government of the Community of Madrid in replacement of Francisco Granados.

=== Regional president of Castilla–La Mancha ===
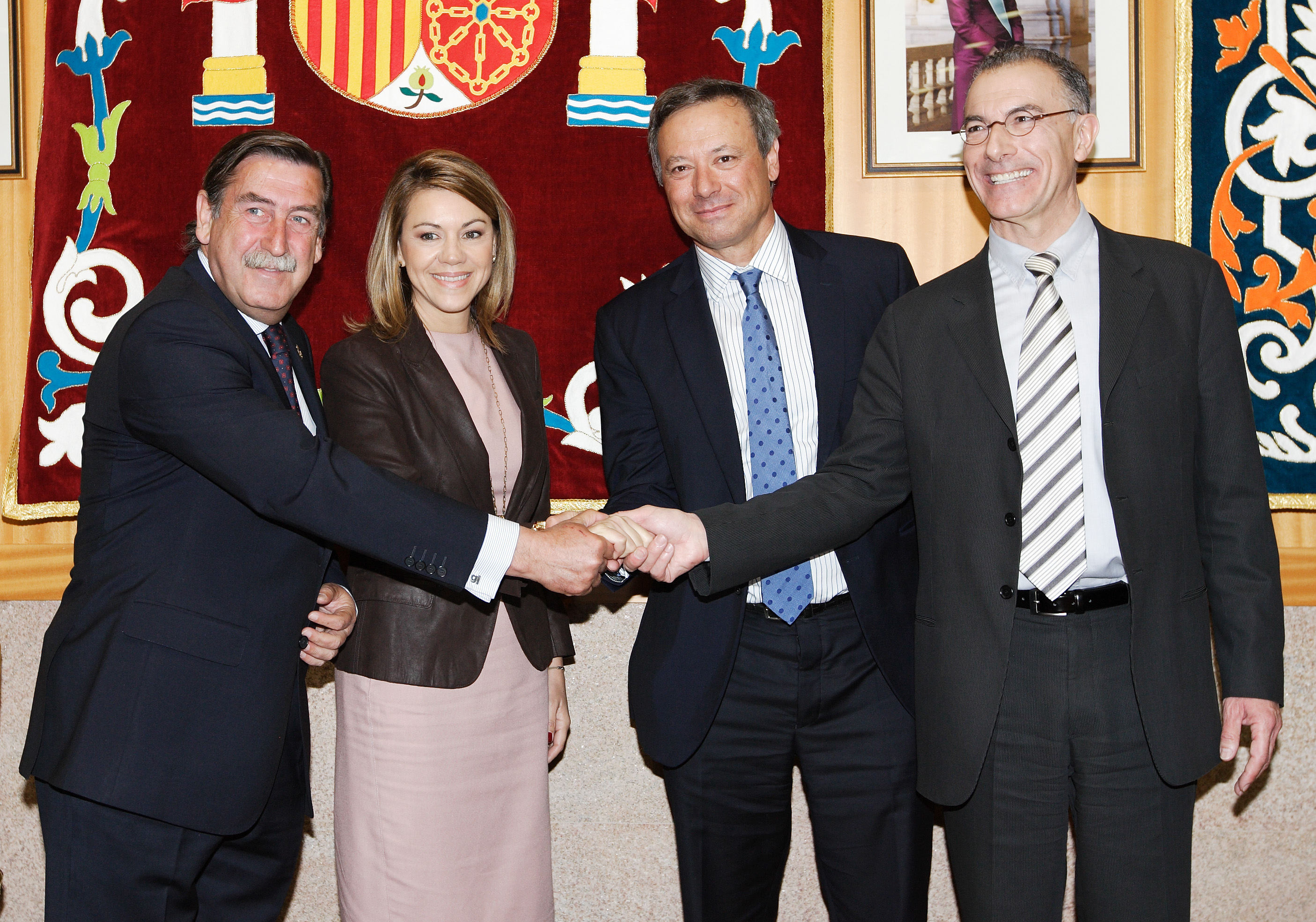
Cospedal in 2012, along the Mayor of Talavera de la Reina.

She was chosen as the People's Party (PP) candidate to the presidency of the autonomous community of Castile-La Mancha vis-à-vis the 2011 regional election. The PP list commanded a qualified majority of seats in the election, with the outcome of the investiture the first PP president in the region, after 28 years of PSOE governments.

With Cospedal repeating as prospective PP candidate for the regional premiership in the context of the 2015 regional election, the PP, despite winning the most votes at the election, failed to attain an absolute majority of seats and PSOE's Emiliano García-Page became President of Castile-La Mancha following an investiture agreement with Podemos.

=== Return to national politics ===
Elected member of the brief 11th Congress of Deputies in the December 2015 general election in representation of Toledo, she chaired the newly created Joint Congress-Senate Committee on National Security from 24 February 2016 to 3 May 2016. She renovated her seat at the June 2016 general election, and, on 3 November 2016, Cospedal was appointed Minister of Defense by PM Mariano Rajoy, an office she held until June 2018, when a vote of no-confidence ousted the government.

=== Failed bid to party leadership ===
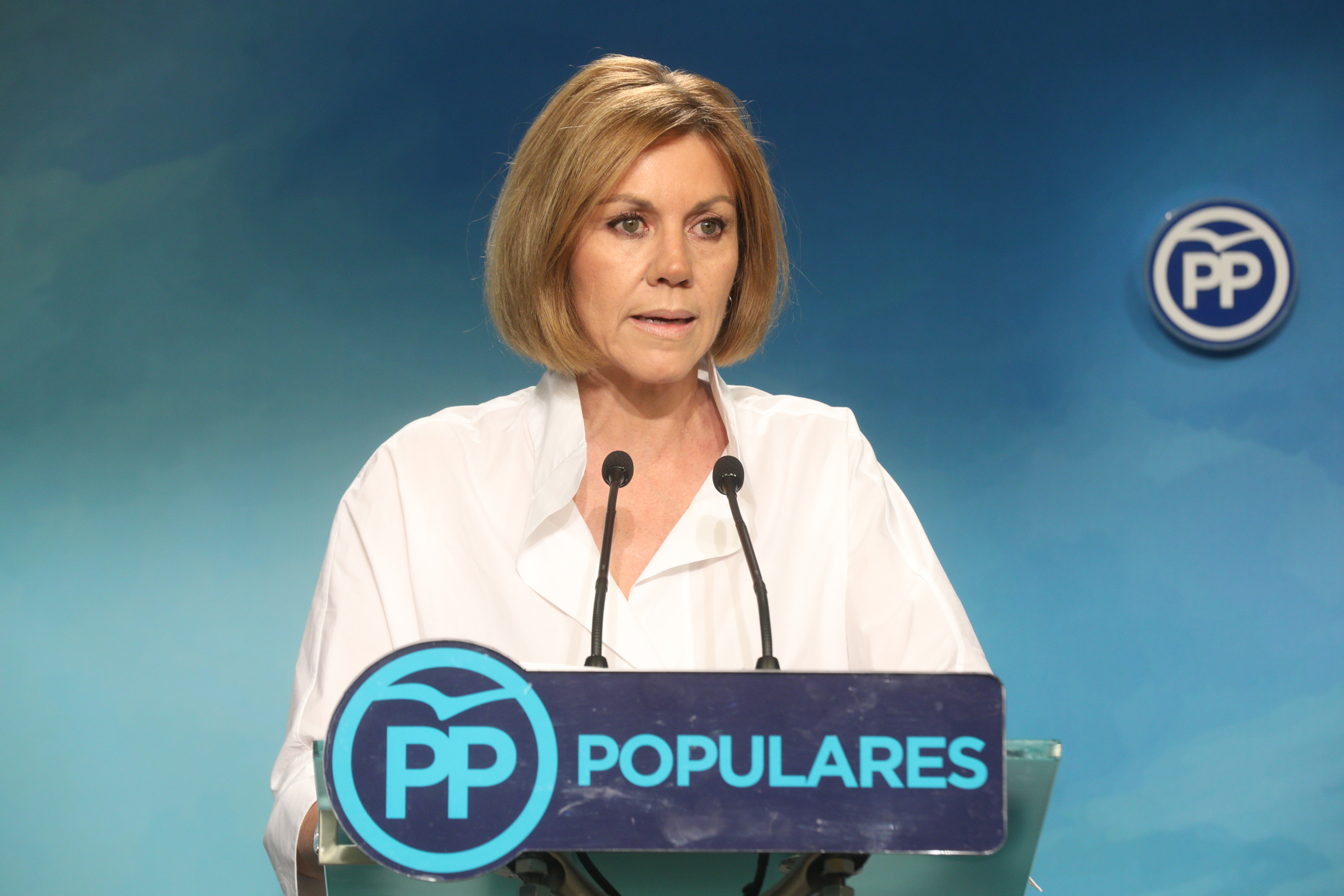
Cospedal conceding defeat at the PP headquarters on the Calle de Génova (July 2018).

After the announcement of Mariano Rajoy stating his resignation to party leadership, Cospedal contested as candidate to the July 2018 party vote among affiliates to determine the new party leader (or failing any candidate to command a qualified majority, the 2 candidates to stand in a run-off voted among party delegates).

Her opponents were former Deputy PM and staunch rival Soraya Sáenz de Santamaría, PP's Vice-Secretary for Communication Pablo Casado, former foreign minister José Manuel García-Margallo, MP José Ramón García Hernández and grassroot member Elio Cabanes.

Cospedal was left out of the race as she commanded the 3rd position in number of votes in the primary election (25,9%) after Sáenz de Santamaría and Casado. Shortly before the runoff among party delegates between Casado and Sáenz de Santamaría, Cospedal publicly declared that she thought that "Pablo Casado could be magnificent option (as party leader)".

=== Secondary role in the PP ===
Following her exit from the cabinet she also served as Chairwoman of the Committee on Foreign Affairs of the Congress of Deputies from 13 September 2018 to 14 November 2018, when she resigned to her seat.

=== Operation Kitchen proceedings ===
In November 2018, recordings of conversations between Cospedal, her husband Ignacio López del Hierro and former police commisisioner José Manuel Villarejo were madre public. In the context of the proceedings concerning Operación Kitchen, Cospedal and López del Hierro were investigated for a period in connection with the alleged espionage operation against PP treasurer Luís Bárcenas. The proccedings against then were later dismised.

In July 2026, National Court Judge, Antonio Piña, ordered to determine whether material seized from Villarejo included recordings of conversations with Cospedal or López del Hierro that could provide indications of criminal conduct.

=== Return to civil service ===
Following her abrupt exit from politics after the "Villarejo Scandal", Cospedal asked for re-incorporation to her career as State Lawyer on 3 January 2019, and soon after she started to work for the Chamber for Contentious Administrative proceedings of the Supreme Court, also reportedly assuming later some additional work in the Chamber of Military proceedings of the Supreme Court.

On 24 March 2020 it was reported that she tested positive for COVID-19 during COVID-19 pandemic in Spain, together with her husband, but not in a serious condition.

== Other activities ==
- Elcano Royal Institute for International and Strategic Studies, Member of the Board of Trustees

== See also ==
- Bárcenas affair
