= Francisco Cañizares =

Spanish politician (born 1971)

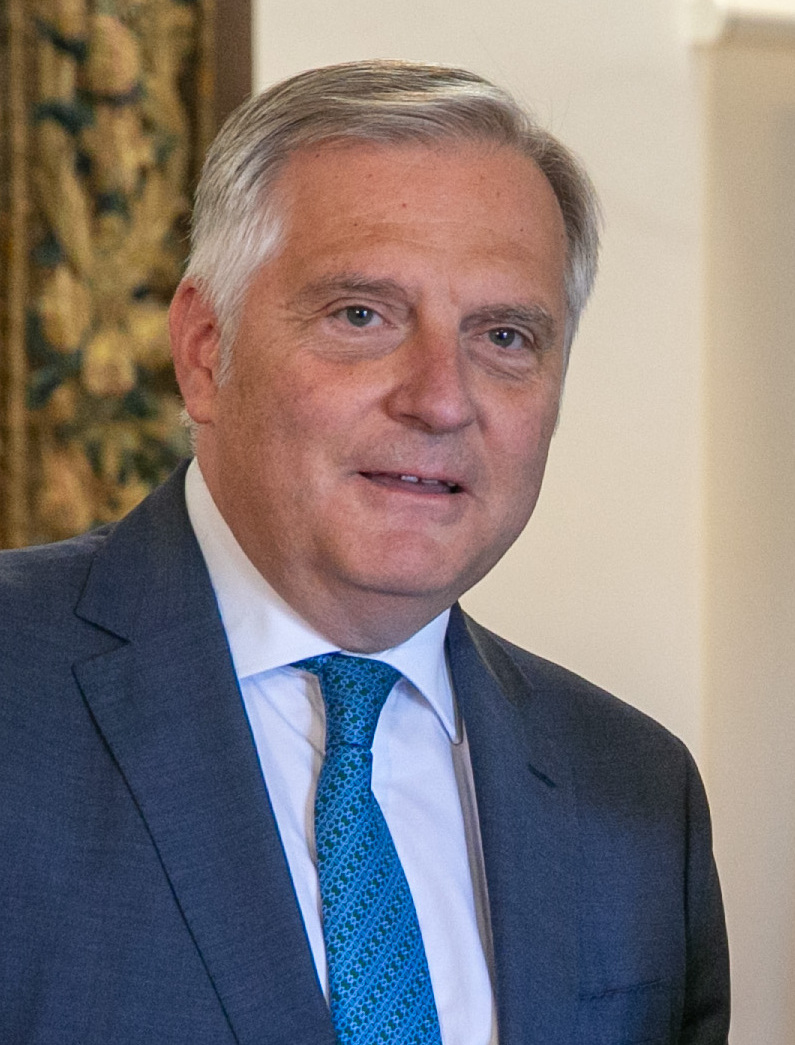
- Cañizares in 2023

Mayor of Ciudad Real
- Incumbent
- Assumed office 17 June 2023
- Preceded by: Eva Masías

Member of the Senate
- In office 3 December 2019 – 29 May 2023
- Constituency: Ciudad Real

Personal details
- Born: 13 August 1971 (age 54)
- Party: People's Party

Francisco Cañizares Jiménez (born 13 August 1971) is a Spanish politician serving as mayor of Ciudad Real since 2023. From 2019 to 2023, he was a member of the Senate.
