= Pilar Marcos Domínguez =

Spanish politician

Member of the Spanish Parliament
- Incumbent
- Assumed office September 19, 2017

Member of the Spanish Parliament
- In office December 11, 2012 – October 27, 2015

Personal details
- Born: May 22, 1962 (age 63) Madrid, Spain
- Party: PP
- Education: Autonomous University of Madrid
- Occupation: Politician

Pilar Marcos Domínguez (May 22, 1962, Madrid, Spain) is a Spanish politician, member of Congress for Madrid during the X, XII and XIV legislatures.

== Biography ==
She studied at the Autonomous University of Madrid, where she earned a degree in economics and a master's degree in journalism. She is also a graduate of the IESE Business School. Between 1985 and 1987 she worked as an assistant professor of Economic Theory at the University of Alcalá de Henares. In 1988 she joined the newspaper El País, where she worked as a journalist until 2006. From that year until 2012 she held the position of Director of Publications at the Foundation for Analysis and Social Studies (FAES) and in 2012 she was General Coordinator of Studies of the City of Madrid.

She was a candidate on the Popular Party list for Madrid on the occasion of the November 2011 general elections but her twenty-fifth position did not allow her to enter the Congress of Deputies. However, the resignation of Santiago Cervera in December 2012 led to her entry into Congress.

She was again part of the lists for the December 2015 elections but due to the results she was not reelected. After the 2016 elections she did not obtain a seat but the resignation of Carmen Álvarez-Arenas on September 18, 2017, allowed her to re-enter the Congress of Deputies.
