= Francisco Javier Márquez Sánchez =

Spanish politician (born 1971)

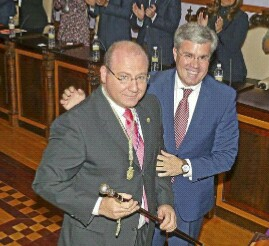
- Márquez in 2016

Member of the Senate
- Incumbent
- Assumed office 21 May 2019
- Constituency: Jaén

Mayor of Jaén
- In office 30 November 2015 – 15 June 2019
- Preceded by: José Enrique Fernández de Moya
- Succeeded by: Julio Millán

Personal details
- Born: 17 September 1971 (age 54)
- Party: People's Party

Francisco Javier Márquez Sánchez (born 17 September 1971) is a Spanish politician serving as a member of the Senate since 2019. From 2015 to 2019, he served as mayor of Jaén.
