= Valentina Martínez Ferro =

Spanish politician (born 1976)

Valentina Martínez
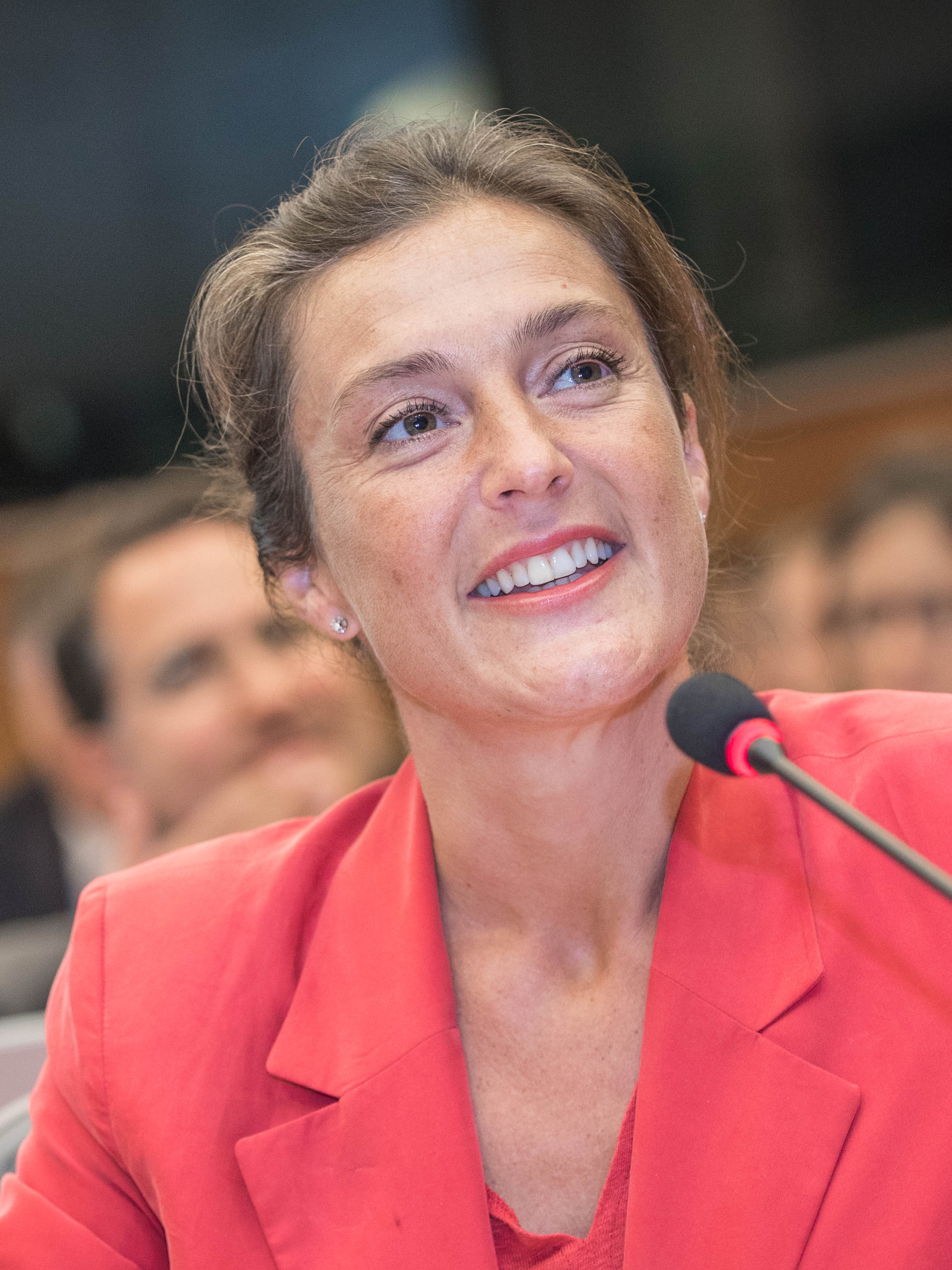

Personal details
- Born: María Valentina Martínez Ferro; 21 June 1976 (age 50) Santiago de Compostela, Spain
- Party: People's Party
- Occupation: Politician; political advisor

María Valentina Martínez Ferro (born 1976) is a Spanish politician of the People's Party (PP) who has been a member of the 10th, 12th and 13th terms of the Congress of Deputies.

== Early life and education ==
Born on 21 June 1976 in Santiago de Compostela (province of A Coruña), Martínez Ferro earned a licentiate degree in Political and Administration Sciences. She later obtained a master's degree in European studies at the Université catholique de Louvain.

== Political career ==
=== Early beginnings ===
Specialised in international relations, Martínez Ferro was part of the Secretariat of International Relations of the People's Party (PP) between 2002 and 2012.

Martínez Ferro was included in the 28th slot of the PP list in Madrid for the 2011 general election. She was not elected then and was appointed Chief of Staff of Jorge Moragas (Mariano Rajoy's Chief of Staff).

=== Member of Parliament, 2014–present ===
Martínez Ferro obtained a parliamentary seat in the Congress of Deputies in October 2014, covering the vacant left by Alberto Ruiz-Gallardón. During the 10th term of the Lower House, she served as Spokesperson in the Committee of International Development Cooperation and as member of the committees of Foreign Affairs and Budget.

Martínez Ferro ran 17th in the PP list in Madrid for the 2016 general election, but she was not elected this time either. In June 2018, she again obtained her seat covering a vacant post, this time the vacant seat left by Mariano Rajoy.

Martínez Ferro ran as candidate to a deputy seat 3rd the PP list for A Coruña (3rd place) vis-à-vis the April 2019 general election. Elected MP, she became a member of the committees on Foreign Affairs, Ecological Transition, International Development Cooperation and the Joint Congress-Senate Committee on the European Union. She replaced José Ramón García Hernández as PP's Secretary on International Relations in July 2019.

In addition to her committee assignments, Martínez Ferro has been a member of the Spanish delegation to the Parliamentary Assembly of the Council of Europe (PACE) since 2022. In the Assembly, she has served on the Committee on Political Affairs and Democracy (since 2020); the Committee on the Honouring of Obligations and Commitments by Member States of the Council of Europe (Monitoring Committee) (since 2021); the Committee on Legal Affairs and Human Rights (2019–2020); the Sub-Committee on Human Rights (2020–2021); and the Sub-Committee on the implementation of judgments of the European Court of Human Rights (2020–2021).

== Other activities ==
- European Council on Foreign Relations (ECFR), Member (since 2021)
