= José Manuel Baltar =

Spanish politician (born 1967)

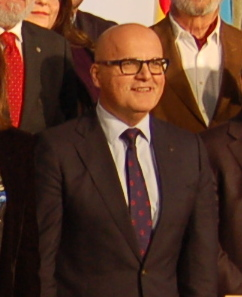
- Baltar in 2019

Member of the Senate
- Incumbent
- Assumed office 29 July 2023
- Appointed by: Parliament of Galicia

Personal details
- Born: 3 August 1967 (age 58)
- Party: People's Party
- Parent: José Luis Baltar (father)

José Manuel Baltar Blanco (born 3 August 1967) is a Spanish politician serving as a member of the Senate since 2023. From 2012 to 2023, he served as president of the provincial deputation of Ourense.
