= José Ramón García Hernández =

Spanish politician (born 1971)

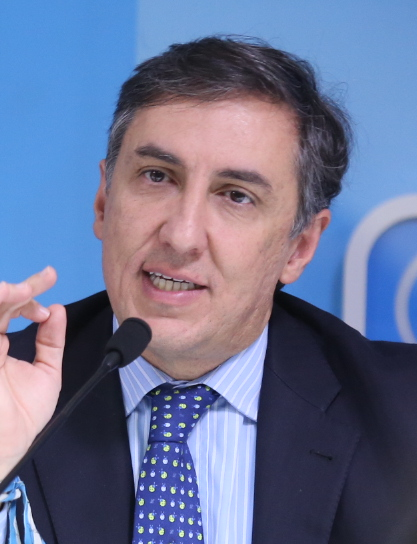
- García in 2017

Member of the Congress of Deputies
- In office 29 April 2014 – 21 May 2019
- Preceded by: Ignacio Astarloa
- Constituency: Madrid (2014–2015); Ávila (2015–2019)

Personal details
- Born: 5 July 1971 (age 54)
- Party: People's Party

José Ramón García Hernández (born 5 July 1971) is a Spanish diplomat and politician serving as ambassador to Croatia since 2025. From 2020 to 2024, he served as ambassador to Norway and Iceland. From 2014 to 2019, he was a member of the Congress of Deputies. From 2016 to 2019, he was a member of the Parliamentary Assembly of the Council of Europe. He was a candidate for president of the People's Party at the 2018 party congress.
