= José Manuel García-Margallo =

Spanish politician

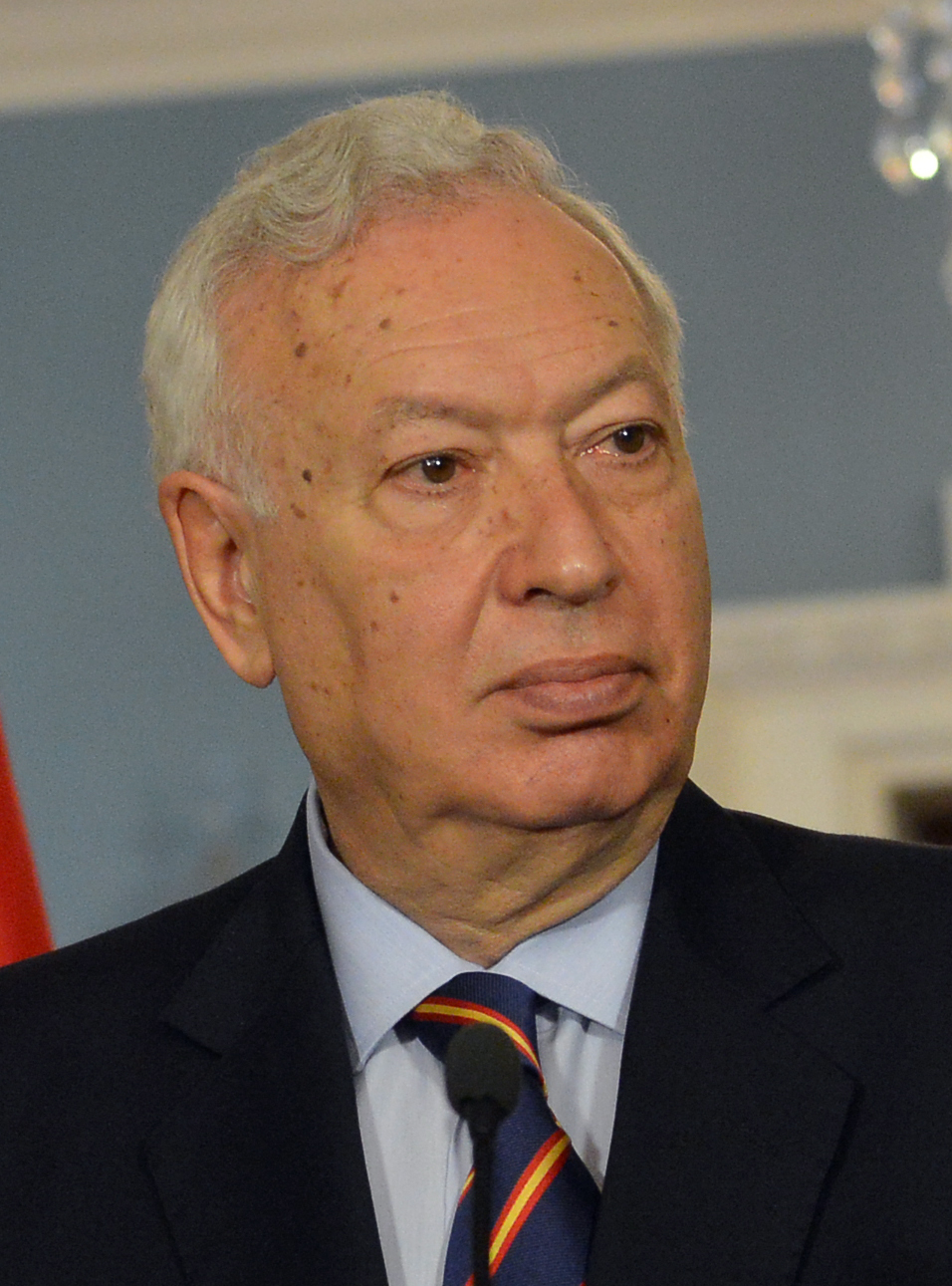

Minister of Foreign Affairs and Cooperation
- In office 22 December 2011 – 4 November 2016
- Prime Minister: Mariano Rajoy
- Preceded by: Trinidad Jiménez
- Succeeded by: Alfonso Dastis

Member of the Congress of Deputies
- In office 13 January 2016 – 21 May 2019
- Constituency: Alicante
- In office 22 June 1986 – 19 July 1994
- Constituency: Valencia
- In office 15 June 1977 – 28 October 1982
- Constituency: Melilla

Member of the European Parliament for Spain
- In office 1 July 2019 – 10 June 2024
- In office 19 July 1994 – 22 December 2011

Personal details
- Born: José Manuel García-Margallo y Marfil; 13 August 1944 (age 82) Madrid, Spain
- Party: People's Party (1989–present); People's Democratic Party (1983–1989); Union of the Democratic Centre (1978–1983); People's Party (1976–1978)
- Education: University of Deusto; Harvard University

José Manuel García-Margallo y Marfil (pronounced [xosemaˈnwel ɣaɾˈθi.a maɾˈɣaʎo]; born 13 August 1944) is a Spanish politician who served as Minister of Foreign Affairs and Cooperation from 2011 to 2016. From 1994 until 2011, and again from 2019 until 2024, he was a member of the European Parliament.

== Early life and education ==
García-Margallo was born in Madrid. In 1960, he joined the Young Spanish Monarchists. He graduated in Law and Economics from the University of Deusto in Bilbao (1965) and subsequently received a master's degree in law (LLM) from Harvard University (1972). His great-grandfather was General Juan García y Margallo, who was killed in 1893 during the First Melillan campaign, otherwise known as the Margallo War.

== Political career ==
In 1976, Margallo was one of the founding members of the center-right People's Party (Partido Popular), a party unrelated to the current party of the same name. In 1977, that party joined others in forming the Union of the Democratic Centre (UCD), a coalition which won the first democratic elections of the modern era in Spain and formed the government from 1977 to 1982. At the 1977 election, he was elected to the Congress of Deputies as member for the single member district of Melilla and was re-elected in 1979, although he lost his seat at the 1982 election to the PSOE.

After the UCD disbanded in 1983, Margallo joined the Democratic Popular Party (PDP) and returned to the Congress at the 1986 election in representation of Valencia, retaining his seat until 1994 when he resigned after being elected to the European Parliament.

=== Member of the European Parliament, 1994–2011 ===
Throughout his time in the European Parliament, Margallo served on the Committee on Economic and Monetary Affairs and Industrial Policy; between 2002 and 2011, he was the committee's vice-chairman. In this capacity, he led the Parliament's work on the European Banking Authority (EBA). He also called for the creation of a European Financial Protection Fund that would bail out large banks in times of crisis and would be financed primarily by contributions from banks themselves.

Margallo also served on the Special Committee on the Financial, Economic and Social Crisis between 2009 and 2011 as well as on the Special Committee on the policy challenges and budgetary resources for a sustainable European Union after 2013 between 2010 and 2011. In addition to his committee assignments, he was a member of the parliament's delegation for relations with the countries of Central America.

Margallo led the EU-Election Observer Mission for the 2010 presidential election in Togo.

=== Foreign Minister of Spain, 2011–2016 ===
On 22 December 2011, Margallo was inaugurated as Minister of Foreign Affairs and Cooperation in the first cabinet presided by Mariano Rajoy.

In March 2012, Margallo announced that, in response to savage killings and human rights abuses in Syria, his country would cease activities at its embassy in Damascus, but would not formally close its mission.

In November 2012, Margallo announced that Spain would follow France in announcing it will support a bid of the Palestinian National Authority for enhanced status at the United Nations when the issue goes to a vote of the General Assembly.

In 2014, amid negotiations towards an accord with the European Union aimed at opening up Cuba, Margallo irritated Raúl Castro's government with his call for Cuba to grant free travel rights to dissidents arrested in the Black Spring of 2003 and later released under strict conditions. During a visit to the country, Margallo was denied an audience with Castro and instead met with First Vice-President Miguel Díaz-Canel.

Margallo has often been critical of Gibraltar. In February 2015 he ordered the closure of the Instituto Cervantes in Gibraltar stating that there was no need for Spanish classes in Gibraltar as "everyone speaks [Spanish] except for the apes". In June 2016, Margallo said Spain would demand control of Gibraltar the "very next day" after a British withdrawal from the EU. Under Margallo's leadership, the Foreign Ministry on 11 July 2016 summoned Britain's ambassador following what it said were "reckless" moves by a Royal Gibraltar Police patrol boat.

Following the Joint Comprehensive Plan of Action on the nuclear program of Iran in 2015, Margallo led a high-level government and business delegation to Iran, joining other countries drawn to Tehran by the possibility of lucrative opportunities that could be unlocked by a nuclear deal. A day after sanctions against Iran were lifted in January 2016, Margallo entered into negotiations with the Iranian government over the construction of an Iranian-owned oil refinery at the Gibraltar strait.

Almost 50 years after coming close to possibly provoking a nuclear disaster, Margallo and his counterpart John Kerry of the United States agreed in 2015 to remove contaminated soil from an area in southern Spain where an American warplane accidentally dropped hydrogen bombs. The deal, announced on a visit by Kerry to Spain, followed years of wrangling between the two countries over how to clean up the area around the seaside village of Palomares, over which the accident took place in 1966.

=== Later activity ===
Margallo did not continue as Foreign Minister after the formation of the Second Rajoy Government in 2016. Margallo later blamed his exit from the Council of Ministers on alleged leverage by Soraya Sáenz de Santamaría. He would nonetheless remain a member of the Congress of Deputies for the rest of its term. In July 2016, he was announced as a new collaborator on Telecinco's breakfast show El programa de Ana Rosa. Following Rajoy's resignation as leader of the PP, Margallo contested the ensuing leadership election in July 2018, facing his bête noire Soraya Sáenz de Santamaría, in addition to another 4 candidates. Margallo won only 688 votes from party members. As only Sáenz de Santamaría and Pablo Casado passed to the second round to be voted by party delegates, Margallo endorsed Casado.

Margallo was included 7th in the PP list for the 2019 European election. Once elected, he became a Member of the European Parliament again, after his 1994–2011 spell. In 2020, he joined the Subcommittee on Tax Matters. During the 2022 leadership crisis in the PP, he called on Casado to step aside, comparing his position to Adolfo Suárez in 1981: "Casado needs to follow Adolfo Suárez's example: when he gave his resignation with the line 'it is the men who serve the PP and not the other way around, because if I'm the first to have to decide between the UCD and Adolfo Suárez, I would choose the UCD. Pablo Casado must take that step for the good of the party and for the good of Spain."

In addition to his committee assignments, Margallo was part of the European Parliament Intergroup on Seas, Rivers, Islands and Coastal Areas.

García-Margallo did not stand for re-election in the 2024 election. He is a frequent guest on Antena 3's political chat show Espejo Público, and on Antena 3's election coverage.

== Other activities ==
- Elcano Royal Institute for International and Strategic Studies, member of the board of trustees
- Instituto Cervantes, ex officio member of the board of trustees

== Honours ==
- Portugal: Grand Cross of the Order of Merit (8 March 2016)

== Works ==
- — (2020). Memorias heterodoxas. De un político de extremo centro. Barcelona: Ediciones Península.

Political offices
Preceded by Trinidad Jiménez	Minister of Foreign Affairs and Cooperation; 2011–2016	Succeeded by Alfonso Dastis
