= 11th Cortes Generales =

Overview
- Legislative body: Cortes Generales
- Jurisdiction: Spain
- Meeting place: Palacio de las Cortes
- Term: 13 January 2016 – 3 May 2016
- Election: 2015 general election
- Members: 350 (Congress); 266 (Senate)
- President of the Congress: Patxi López (PSOE)
- President of the Senate: Pío García-Escudero (PP)
- Prime Minister: Mariano Rajoy (PP)
- Leader of the Opposition: Pedro Sánchez (PSOE)

The 11th Cortes Generales comprised both the lower (Congress) and upper (Senate) houses of the legislature of Spain following the 2015 general election on 20 December 2015. They first convened on 13 January 2016, and were dissolved on 3 May 2016.

The 2015 election saw 52 constituencies return 350 MPs for Congress and 208 for Senate. The People's Party (PP), led by Mariano Rajoy, remained the largest party. However, with 123 seats, it lost its overall majority and had its worst election performance since 1989. The Spanish Socialist Workers' Party (PSOE) secured 90 seats, the lowest in the party's history, but managed to retain its place as the main opposition force. Newcomer parties Podemos and Citizens (C's) saw strong gains, becoming the third and fourth political forces in the country with 69 and 40 seats, respectively.

== Congress of Deputies ==
=== Composition ===
Composition as of January 2016.

Parliamentary Group	Jan 2016
People's Group	119
Socialist Group	89
Podemos–En Comú–Marea Group	65
Citizens Group	40
Republican Left Group	9
Democracy and Freedom Catalan Group	8
PNV Basque Group	6
Mixed Group	14

=== List of members ===
Party	Name	Constituency	From	Until
People's Party (119)	Albaladejo Martínez, Joaquín	Alicante	2016/01/13	2016/05/03
People's Party (119)	Alonso Aranegui, Alfonso	Álava	2016/01/13	2016/05/03
People's Party (119)	Alós López, Ana Isabel	Huesca	2016/01/13	2016/05/03
People's Party (119)	Álvarez Simón, María Elena	Santa Cruz de Tenerife	2016/01/13	2016/05/03
People's Party (119)	Álvarez-Arenas Cisneros, María del Carmen	Madrid	2016/01/13	2016/05/03
People's Party (119)	Angulo Romero, María Teresa	Badajoz	2016/01/13	2016/05/03
People's Party (119)	Asian González, Matilde Pastora	Las Palmas	2016/01/13	2016/05/03
People's Party (119)	Ayala Sánchez, Andrés José	Murcia	2016/01/13	2016/05/03
People's Party (119)	Ayllón Manso, José Luis	Madrid	2016/01/13	2016/05/03
People's Party (119)	Bajo Prieto, María Luz	Madrid	2016/01/13	2016/05/03
People's Party (119)	Báñez García, María Fátima	Huelva	2016/01/13	2016/05/03
People's Party (119)	Barrachina Ros, Miguel	Castellón	2016/01/13	2016/05/03
People's Party (119)	Barreda de los Ríos, Leopoldo	Biscay	2016/01/13	2016/05/03
People's Party (119)	Barrios Tejero, José María	Zamora	2016/01/13	2016/05/03
People's Party (119)	Bastidas Bono, Elena María	Valencia	2016/01/13	2016/05/03
People's Party (119)	Bermúdez de Castro Fernández, José Antonio	Salamanca	2016/01/13	2016/05/03
People's Party (119)	Blasco Marqués, Manuel	Teruel	2016/01/13	2016/05/03
People's Party (119)	Bonilla Domínguez, María Jesús	Cuenca	2016/01/13	2016/05/03
People's Party (119)	Borrego Cortés, Isabel María	Murcia	2016/01/13	2016/05/03
People's Party (119)	Bravo Baena, Juan	Ceuta	2016/01/13	2016/05/03
People's Party (119)	Bravo Ibáñez, María Concepción	La Rioja	2016/01/13	2016/05/03
People's Party (119)	Burgos Gallego, Tomás	Valladolid	2016/01/13	2016/05/03
People's Party (119)	Cabrera García, Francisco Domingo	Las Palmas	2016/04/19	2016/05/03
People's Party (119)	Camps Devesa, Gerardo	Alicante	2016/01/13	2016/05/03
People's Party (119)	Candón Adán, Alfonso	Cádiz	2016/01/13	2016/05/03
People's Party (119)	Carreño Fernández, María Ascensión	Murcia	2016/01/13	2016/05/03
People's Party (119)	Casado Blanco, Pablo	Ávila	2016/01/13	2016/05/03
People's Party (119)	Cascales Martínez, Loreto	Alicante	2016/01/13	2016/05/03
People's Party (119)	Catalá Polo, Rafael	Cuenca	2016/01/13	2016/05/03
People's Party (119)	Chiquillo Barber, José María	Valencia	2016/01/13	2016/05/03
People's Party (119)	Clavell López, Óscar	Castellón	2016/01/13	2016/05/03
People's Party (119)	Cortés Bureta, Pilar	Zaragoza	2016/01/13	2016/05/03
People's Party (119)	De Cospedal García, María Dolores	Toledo	2016/01/13	2016/05/03
People's Party (119)	Del Río Sanz, Emilio	La Rioja	2016/01/13	2016/05/03
People's Party (119)	Delgado Arce, Celso Luis	Ourense	2016/01/13	2016/05/03
People's Party (119)	Dueñas Martínez, María del Carmen	Melilla	2016/01/13	2016/05/03
People's Party (119)	Echániz Salgado, José Ignacio	Madrid	2016/01/13	2016/05/03
People's Party (119)	Eiros Bouza, José María	Valladolid	2016/01/13	2016/05/03
People's Party (119)	Escudero Berzal, Beatriz Marta	Segovia	2016/01/13	2016/05/03
People's Party (119)	España Reina, Carolina	Málaga	2016/01/13	2016/05/03
People's Party (119)	Fernández de Moya Romero, José Enrique	Jaén	2016/01/13	2016/05/03
People's Party (119)	Fernández Díaz, Jorge	Barcelona	2016/01/13	2016/05/03
People's Party (119)	Fernández García, Eduardo	León	2016/01/13	2016/05/03
People's Party (119)	Floriano Corrales, Carlos Javier	Cáceres	2016/01/13	2016/05/03
People's Party (119)	García Cañal, José Ramón	Asturias	2016/01/13	2016/05/03
People's Party (119)	García Díez, Joaquín María	Lugo	2016/01/13	2016/05/03
People's Party (119)	García Egea, Teodoro	Murcia	2016/01/13	2016/05/03
People's Party (119)	García Hernández, José Ramón	Ávila	2016/01/13	2016/05/03
People's Party (119)	García Tejerina, Isabel	Madrid	2016/01/13	2016/05/03
People's Party (119)	García Urbano, José María	Málaga	2016/01/13	2016/04/21
People's Party (119)	García-Margallo y Marfil, José Manuel	Alicante	2016/01/13	2016/05/03
People's Party (119)	García-Pelayo Jurado, María José	Cádiz	2016/01/13	2016/05/03
People's Party (119)	García-Tizón López, Arturo	Toledo	2016/01/13	2016/05/03
People's Party (119)	Garrido Valenzuela, Irene	Pontevedra	2016/01/13	2016/05/03
People's Party (119)	González Guinda, María del Carmen	León	2016/01/13	2016/05/03
People's Party (119)	González Muñoz, Ángel Luis	Málaga	2016/01/13	2016/05/03
People's Party (119)	González Terol, Antonio Pablo	Madrid	2016/01/13	2016/05/03
People's Party (119)	González Vázquez, Marta	A Coruña	2016/01/13	2016/05/03
People's Party (119)	Hernando Fraile, Rafael Antonio	Almería	2016/01/13	2016/05/03
People's Party (119)	Herrero Bono, José Alberto	Teruel	2016/01/13	2016/05/03
People's Party (119)	Hoyo Juliá, Belén	Valencia	2016/01/13	2016/05/03
People's Party (119)	Isac García, Ángeles	Jaén	2016/01/13	2016/05/03
People's Party (119)	Isern Estela, Mateo	Balearic Islands	2016/01/13	2016/05/03
People's Party (119)	Juncal Rodríguez, Juan Manuel	A Coruña	2016/01/13	2016/05/03
People's Party (119)	Lara Carbó, María Teresa de	Madrid	2016/01/13	2016/05/03
People's Party (119)	Lassalle Ruiz, José María	Cantabria	2016/01/13	2016/05/03
People's Party (119)	López Ares, Susana	Asturias	2016/01/13	2016/05/03
People's Party (119)	Lorenzo Torres, Miguel	A Coruña	2016/01/13	2016/05/03
People's Party (119)	Luis Rodríguez, Teófilo de	Madrid	2016/01/13	2016/05/03
People's Party (119)	Madrazo Díaz, Ana María	Cantabria	2016/01/13	2016/05/03
People's Party (119)	Marcos Moyano, María Dolores	Cáceres	2016/01/13	2016/05/03
People's Party (119)	Marí Bosó, José Vicente	Alicante	2016/01/13	2016/05/03
People's Party (119)	Mariscal Anaya, Guillermo	Las Palmas	2016/01/13	2016/05/03
People's Party (119)	Martínez Saiz, Teófila	Cádiz	2016/01/13	2016/05/03
People's Party (119)	Martínez-Maillo Toribio, Fernando	Zamora	2016/01/13	2016/05/03
People's Party (119)	Martín-Toledano Suárez, José Alberto	Ciudad Real	2016/01/13	2016/05/03
People's Party (119)	Matarí Sáez, Juan José	Almería	2016/01/13	2016/05/03
People's Party (119)	Mateu Istúriz, Jaime Miguel	Burgos	2016/01/13	2016/05/03
People's Party (119)	Matos Mascareño, Pablo	Santa Cruz de Tenerife	2016/01/13	2016/05/03
People's Party (119)	Méndez de Vigo Montojo, Íñigo	Palencia	2016/01/13	2016/05/03
People's Party (119)	Merino López, Rafael	Córdoba	2016/01/13	2016/05/03
People's Party (119)	Molinero Hoyos, Francisco	Albacete	2016/01/13	2016/05/03
People's Party (119)	Moneo Díez, María Sandra	Burgos	2016/01/13	2016/05/03
People's Party (119)	Montoro Romero, Cristóbal Ricardo	Madrid	2016/01/13	2016/05/03
People's Party (119)	Montserrat Montserrat, Dolors	Barcelona	2016/01/13	2016/05/03
People's Party (119)	Moragas Sánchez, Jorge	Barcelona	2016/01/13	2016/05/03
People's Party (119)	Moreno Bustos, Ramón	Zaragoza	2016/01/13	2016/05/03
People's Party (119)	Moreno Palanques, Rubén	Valencia	2016/01/13	2016/05/03
People's Party (119)	Moro Almaraz, María Jesús	Salamanca	2016/01/13	2016/05/03
People's Party (119)	Nadal Belda, Álvaro María	Madrid	2016/01/13	2016/05/03
People's Party (119)	Navarro Lacoba, Carmen	Albacete	2016/01/13	2016/05/03
People's Party (119)	Nieto Ballesteros, José Antonio	Córdoba	2016/01/13	2016/05/03
People's Party (119)	Olano Vela, Jaime Eduardo de	Lugo	2016/01/13	2016/05/03
People's Party (119)	Paniagua Núñez, Miguel Ángel	Palencia	2016/01/13	2016/05/03
People's Party (119)	Pastor Julián, Ana María	Pontevedra	2016/01/13	2016/05/03
People's Party (119)	Pérez Aras, Juan Vicente	Valencia	2016/01/13	2016/05/03
People's Party (119)	Pérez López, Santiago	Granada	2016/01/13	2016/05/03
People's Party (119)	Posada Moreno, Jesús	Soria	2016/01/13	2016/05/03
People's Party (119)	Quintanilla Barba, María del Carmen	Ciudad Real	2016/01/13	2016/05/03
People's Party (119)	Rajoy Brey, Mariano	Madrid	2016/01/13	2016/05/03
People's Party (119)	Ramírez del Molino Morán, Alejandro	Badajoz	2016/01/13	2016/05/03
People's Party (119)	Reynés Calvache, Águeda	Balearic Islands	2016/01/13	2016/05/03
People's Party (119)	Roca Mas, Jordi	Tarragona	2016/01/13	2016/05/03
People's Party (119)	Rojas García, Carlos	Granada	2016/01/13	2016/05/03
People's Party (119)	Rojo Noguera, Pilar	Pontevedra	2016/01/13	2016/05/03
People's Party (119)	Romero Hernández, Carmelo	Huelva	2016/01/13	2016/05/03
People's Party (119)	Romero Rodríguez, María Eugenia	Seville	2016/01/13	2016/05/03
People's Party (119)	Romero Sánchez, Rosa María	Ciudad Real	2016/01/13	2016/05/03
People's Party (119)	Sáenz de Santamaría Antón, María Soraya	Madrid	2016/01/13	2016/05/03
People's Party (119)	Sánchez-Camacho Pérez, Alicia	Barcelona	2016/01/13	2016/05/03
People's Party (119)	Santa Ana Fernández, María de la Concepción de	Granada	2016/01/13	2016/05/03
People's Party (119)	Soria López, José Manuel	Las Palmas	2016/01/13	2016/04/15
People's Party (119)	Suárez Lamata, Eloy	Zaragoza	2016/01/13	2016/05/03
People's Party (119)	Tarno Blanco, Ricardo	Seville	2016/01/13	2016/05/03
People's Party (119)	Valmaña Ochaíta, Silvia	Guadalajara	2016/01/13	2016/05/03
People's Party (119)	Vázquez Rojas, Juan María	Murcia	2016/01/13	2016/05/03
People's Party (119)	Vera Pró, Juan Carlos	Madrid	2016/01/13	2016/05/03
People's Party (119)	Villalobos Talero, Celia	Málaga	2016/01/13	2016/05/03
People's Party (119)	Viso Diéguez, Miguel Ángel	Ourense	2016/01/13	2016/05/03
People's Party (119)	Zoido Álvarez, Juan Ignacio	Seville	2016/01/13	2016/05/03
Spanish Socialist Workers' Party (89)	Ábalos Meco, José Luis	Valencia	2016/01/13	2016/05/03
Spanish Socialist Workers' Party (89)	Alconchel Gonzaga, Miriam	Cádiz	2016/01/13	2016/05/03
Spanish Socialist Workers' Party (89)	Antón Cacho, Javier	Soria	2016/01/13	2016/05/03
Spanish Socialist Workers' Party (89)	Barreda Fontes, José María	Ciudad Real	2016/01/13	2016/05/03
Spanish Socialist Workers' Party (89)	Batet Lamaña, Meritxell	Madrid	2016/01/13	2016/05/03
Spanish Socialist Workers' Party (89)	Blanquer Alcaraz, Patricia	Alicante	2016/01/13	2016/05/03
Spanish Socialist Workers' Party (89)	Botella Gómez, Ana María	Valencia	2016/01/13	2016/05/03
Spanish Socialist Workers' Party (89)	Camacho Sánchez, José Miguel	Toledo	2016/01/13	2016/05/03
Spanish Socialist Workers' Party (89)	Cámara Villar, Gregorio	Granada	2016/01/13	2016/05/03
Spanish Socialist Workers' Party (89)	Campo Moreno, Juan Carlos	Cádiz	2016/01/13	2016/05/03
Spanish Socialist Workers' Party (89)	Campos Arteseros, Herick Manuel	Alicante	2016/01/13	2016/05/03
Spanish Socialist Workers' Party (89)	Cancela Rodríguez, Pilar	A Coruña	2016/01/13	2016/05/03
Spanish Socialist Workers' Party (89)	Cantera de Castro, Zaida	Madrid	2016/01/13	2016/05/03
Spanish Socialist Workers' Party (89)	Cuello Pérez, Carmen Rocío	Seville	2016/01/13	2016/05/03
Spanish Socialist Workers' Party (89)	De Frutos Madrazo, María del Rocío	Ourense	2016/01/13	2016/05/03
Spanish Socialist Workers' Party (89)	De la Encina Ortega, Salvador Antonio	Cádiz	2016/01/13	2016/05/03
Spanish Socialist Workers' Party (89)	Del Moral Milla, María de la Paz	Jaén	2016/01/13	2016/05/03
Spanish Socialist Workers' Party (89)	Díaz Trillo, José Juan	Huelva	2016/01/13	2016/05/03
Spanish Socialist Workers' Party (89)	Elorza González, Odón	Gipuzkoa	2016/01/13	2016/05/03
Spanish Socialist Workers' Party (89)	Fernández Díaz, Jesús María	Navarre	2016/01/13	2016/05/03
Spanish Socialist Workers' Party (89)	Ferrer Tesoro, Sonia	Almería	2016/01/13	2016/05/03
Spanish Socialist Workers' Party (89)	Flórez Rodríguez, María Aurora	León	2016/01/13	2016/05/03
Spanish Socialist Workers' Party (89)	Franquis Vera, Sebastián	Las Palmas	2016/01/13	2016/05/03
Spanish Socialist Workers' Party (89)	Galeano Gracia, Óscar	Zaragoza	2016/01/13	2016/05/03
Spanish Socialist Workers' Party (89)	Gallego Arriola, María del Puerto	Cantabria	2016/01/13	2016/05/03
Spanish Socialist Workers' Party (89)	Galovart Carrera, María Dolores	Pontevedra	2016/01/13	2016/05/03
Spanish Socialist Workers' Party (89)	García Mira, Ricardo Antonio	A Coruña	2016/01/13	2016/05/03
Spanish Socialist Workers' Party (89)	Girela de la Fuente, José Manuel	Seville	2016/01/13	2016/05/03
Spanish Socialist Workers' Party (89)	González Bayo, Josefa Inmaculada	Huelva	2016/01/13	2016/05/03
Spanish Socialist Workers' Party (89)	González Ramos, Manuel Gabriel	Albacete	2016/01/13	2016/05/03
Spanish Socialist Workers' Party (89)	González Veracruz, María	Murcia	2016/01/13	2016/05/03
Spanish Socialist Workers' Party (89)	Gordo Pérez, Juan Luis	Segovia	2016/01/13	2016/05/03
Spanish Socialist Workers' Party (89)	Gutiérrez Limones, Antonio	Seville	2016/01/13	2016/05/03
Spanish Socialist Workers' Party (89)	Heredia Díaz, Miguel Ángel	Málaga	2016/01/13	2016/05/03
Spanish Socialist Workers' Party (89)	Hernández Spínola, Francisco	Santa Cruz de Tenerife	2016/01/13	2016/05/03
Spanish Socialist Workers' Party (89)	Hernando Vera, Antonio	Madrid	2016/01/13	2016/05/03
Spanish Socialist Workers' Party (89)	Hernanz Costa, Sofía	Balearic Islands	2016/01/13	2016/05/03
Spanish Socialist Workers' Party (89)	Hurtado Zurera, Antonio	Córdoba	2016/01/13	2016/05/03
Spanish Socialist Workers' Party (89)	Jiménez Tortosa, Juan	Almería	2016/01/13	2016/05/03
Spanish Socialist Workers' Party (89)	Lasarte Iribarren, José Javier	Álava	2016/01/13	2016/05/03
Spanish Socialist Workers' Party (89)	Lastra Fernández, Adriana	Asturias	2016/01/13	2016/05/03
Spanish Socialist Workers' Party (89)	López Álvarez, Patxi	Biscay	2016/01/13	2016/05/03
Spanish Socialist Workers' Party (89)	López Milla, Julián	Alicante	2016/01/13	2016/05/03
Spanish Socialist Workers' Party (89)	Lozano Domingo, Irene	Madrid	2016/01/13	2016/05/03
Spanish Socialist Workers' Party (89)	Lucio Carrasco, María Pilar	Cáceres	2016/01/13	2016/05/03
Spanish Socialist Workers' Party (89)	Luena López, César	La Rioja	2016/01/13	2016/05/03
Spanish Socialist Workers' Party (89)	Martín González, María Guadalupe	Toledo	2016/01/13	2016/05/03
Spanish Socialist Workers' Party (89)	Martínez Seijo, María Luz	Palencia	2016/01/13	2016/05/03
Spanish Socialist Workers' Party (89)	Meijón Couselo, Guillermo Antonio	Pontevedra	2016/01/13	2016/05/03
Spanish Socialist Workers' Party (89)	Muñoz González, Pedro José	Ávila	2016/01/13	2016/05/03
Spanish Socialist Workers' Party (89)	Navarro Garzón, Micaela	Jaén	2016/01/13	2016/05/03
Spanish Socialist Workers' Party (89)	Palacín Guarné, Gonzalo	Huesca	2016/01/13	2016/05/03
Spanish Socialist Workers' Party (89)	Peña Camarero, Esther	Burgos	2016/01/13	2016/05/03
Spanish Socialist Workers' Party (89)	Pérez Domínguez, María Soledad	Badajoz	2016/01/13	2016/05/03
Spanish Socialist Workers' Party (89)	Pérez Herraiz, Margarita	Lugo	2016/01/13	2016/05/03
Spanish Socialist Workers' Party (89)	Pradas Torres, Antonio	Seville	2016/01/13	2016/05/03
Spanish Socialist Workers' Party (89)	Rallo Lombarte, Artemi Vicent	Castellón	2016/01/13	2016/05/03
Spanish Socialist Workers' Party (89)	Ramón Utrabo, Elvira	Granada	2016/01/13	2016/05/03
Spanish Socialist Workers' Party (89)	Ramos Esteban, César Joaquín	Cáceres	2016/01/13	2016/05/03
Spanish Socialist Workers' Party (89)	Raya Rodríguez, María Tamara	Santa Cruz de Tenerife	2016/01/13	2016/05/03
Spanish Socialist Workers' Party (89)	Rodríguez Fernández, María Luz	Guadalajara	2016/01/13	2016/05/03
Spanish Socialist Workers' Party (89)	Rodríguez García, Isabel	Ciudad Real	2016/01/13	2016/05/03
Spanish Socialist Workers' Party (89)	Rodríguez Hernández, Juana Amalia	Seville	2016/01/13	2016/05/03
Spanish Socialist Workers' Party (89)	Rodríguez Ramos, María Soraya	Valladolid	2016/01/13	2016/05/03
Spanish Socialist Workers' Party (89)	Rominguera Salazar, María del Mar	Zamora	2016/01/13	2016/05/03
Spanish Socialist Workers' Party (89)	Sahuquillo García, Luis Carlos	Cuenca	2016/01/13	2016/05/03
Spanish Socialist Workers' Party (89)	Sánchez Amor, José Ignacio	Badajoz	2016/01/13	2016/05/03
Spanish Socialist Workers' Party (89)	Sánchez Pérez-Castejón, Pedro	Madrid	2016/01/13	2016/05/03
Spanish Socialist Workers' Party (89)	Saura García, Pedro	Murcia	2016/01/13	2016/05/03
Spanish Socialist Workers' Party (89)	Serrada Pariente, David	Salamanca	2016/01/13	2016/05/03
Spanish Socialist Workers' Party (89)	Serrano Boigas, Pilar Auxiliadora	Málaga	2016/01/13	2016/05/03
Spanish Socialist Workers' Party (89)	Serrano Jiménez, María Jesús	Córdoba	2016/01/13	2016/05/03
Spanish Socialist Workers' Party (89)	Sicilia Alférez, Felipe Jesús	Jaén	2016/01/13	2016/05/03
Spanish Socialist Workers' Party (89)	Sierra Rojas, Patricia	Badajoz	2016/01/13	2016/05/03
Spanish Socialist Workers' Party (89)	Simancas Simancas, Rafael	Madrid	2016/01/13	2016/05/03
Spanish Socialist Workers' Party (89)	Socias Puig, Ramón Antonio	Balearic Islands	2016/01/13	2016/05/03
Spanish Socialist Workers' Party (89)	Such Palomares, María	Valencia	2016/01/13	2016/05/03
Spanish Socialist Workers' Party (89)	Sumelzo Jordán, Susana	Zaragoza	2016/01/13	2016/05/03
Spanish Socialist Workers' Party (89)	Torres Mora, José Andrés	Málaga	2016/01/13	2016/05/03
Spanish Socialist Workers' Party (89)	Trevín Lombán, Antonio Ramón María	Asturias	2016/01/13	2016/05/03
Spanish Socialist Workers' Party (89)	Urquizu Sancho, Ignacio	Teruel	2016/01/13	2016/05/03
Spanish Socialist Workers' Party (89)	Chacón Piqueras, Carme	Barcelona	2016/01/13	2016/05/03
Spanish Socialist Workers' Party (89)	Guinart Moreno, Lídia	Barcelona	2016/01/13	2016/05/03
Spanish Socialist Workers' Party (89)	Lafuente de la Torre, Mónica	Lleida	2016/01/13	2016/05/03
Spanish Socialist Workers' Party (89)	Lamuà Estañol, Marc	Girona	2016/01/13	2016/05/03
Spanish Socialist Workers' Party (89)	Perea i Conillas, María Mercè	Barcelona	2016/01/13	2016/05/03
Spanish Socialist Workers' Party (89)	Rodríguez Sánchez, Germán	Barcelona	2016/01/13	2016/05/03
Spanish Socialist Workers' Party (89)	Ruiz i Carbonell, Joan	Tarragona	2016/01/13	2016/05/03
Spanish Socialist Workers' Party (89)	Zaragoza Alonso, José	Barcelona	2016/01/13	2016/05/03
Podemos–En Comú Podem–En Marea (65)	Alba Goveli, Nayua Miriam	Gipuzkoa	2016/01/13	2016/05/03
Podemos–En Comú Podem–En Marea (65)	Alonso Clusa, Rosa Ana	Cantabria	2016/01/13	2016/05/03
Podemos–En Comú Podem–En Marea (65)	Arrojo Agudo, Pedro	Zaragoza	2016/01/13	2016/05/03
Podemos–En Comú Podem–En Marea (65)	Belarra Urteaga, Ione	Navarre	2016/01/13	2016/05/03
Podemos–En Comú Podem–En Marea (65)	Bescansa Hernández, Carolina	Madrid	2016/01/13	2016/05/03
Podemos–En Comú Podem–En Marea (65)	Botejara Sanz, Amparo	Badajoz	2016/01/13	2016/05/03
Podemos–En Comú Podem–En Marea (65)	Bravo Bueno, David	Almería	2016/01/13	2016/05/03
Podemos–En Comú Podem–En Marea (65)	Bustinduy Amador, Pablo	Madrid	2016/01/13	2016/05/03
Podemos–En Comú Podem–En Marea (65)	Carreño Valero, Sara	La Rioja	2016/01/13	2016/05/03
Podemos–En Comú Podem–En Marea (65)	De la Concha García-Mauriño, María Asunción Jacoba Pía	Balearic Islands	2016/01/13	2016/05/03
Podemos–En Comú Podem–En Marea (65)	Del Olmo Ibáñez, Juan Manuel	Valladolid	2016/01/13	2016/05/03
Podemos–En Comú Podem–En Marea (65)	Delgado Ramos, Juan Antonio	Cádiz	2016/01/13	2016/05/03
Podemos–En Comú Podem–En Marea (65)	Domínguez Álvarez, Marta	Córdoba	2016/01/13	2016/05/03
Podemos–En Comú Podem–En Marea (65)	Elizo Serrano, María Gloria	Toledo	2016/01/13	2016/05/03
Podemos–En Comú Podem–En Marea (65)	Errejón Galván, Íñigo	Madrid	2016/01/13	2016/05/03
Podemos–En Comú Podem–En Marea (65)	Fernández Castañón, Sofía	Asturias	2016/01/13	2016/05/03
Podemos–En Comú Podem–En Marea (65)	Franco Carmona, Isabel	Huelva	2016/01/13	2016/05/03
Podemos–En Comú Podem–En Marea (65)	González García, Segundo	Asturias	2016/01/13	2016/05/03
Podemos–En Comú Podem–En Marea (65)	Guerra Mansito, María Belén	Madrid	2016/01/13	2016/05/03
Podemos–En Comú Podem–En Marea (65)	Honorato Chulián, María Auxiliadora	Seville	2016/01/13	2016/05/03
Podemos–En Comú Podem–En Marea (65)	Iglesias García, Fernando	Gipuzkoa	2016/01/13	2016/05/03
Podemos–En Comú Podem–En Marea (65)	Iglesias Turrión, Pablo Manuel	Madrid	2016/01/13	2016/05/03
Podemos–En Comú Podem–En Marea (65)	Marcello Santos, Ana	León	2016/01/13	2016/05/03
Podemos–En Comú Podem–En Marea (65)	Maura Zorita, Eduardo Javier	Biscay	2016/01/13	2016/05/03
Podemos–En Comú Podem–En Marea (65)	Mayoral Perales, Rafael	Madrid	2016/01/13	2016/05/03
Podemos–En Comú Podem–En Marea (65)	Medina Suárez, María Isabel	Málaga	2016/01/13	2016/05/03
Podemos–En Comú Podem–En Marea (65)	Montero Gil, Irene María	Madrid	2016/01/13	2016/05/03
Podemos–En Comú Podem–En Marea (65)	Montero Soler, Alberto	Málaga	2016/01/13	2016/05/03
Podemos–En Comú Podem–En Marea (65)	Pascual Peña, Sergio	Seville	2016/01/13	2016/05/03
Podemos–En Comú Podem–En Marea (65)	Pita Cárdenes, María del Carmen	Las Palmas	2016/01/13	2016/05/03
Podemos–En Comú Podem–En Marea (65)	Rodríguez Rodríguez, Alberto	Santa Cruz de Tenerife	2016/01/13	2016/05/03
Podemos–En Comú Podem–En Marea (65)	Rosell Aguilar, María Victoria	Las Palmas	2016/01/13	2016/05/03
Podemos–En Comú Podem–En Marea (65)	Sánchez Melero, Tania	Madrid	2016/01/13	2016/05/03
Podemos–En Comú Podem–En Marea (65)	Sánchez Serna, Javier	Murcia	2016/01/13	2016/05/03
Podemos–En Comú Podem–En Marea (65)	Santos Itoiz, Eduardo	Navarre	2016/01/13	2016/05/03
Podemos–En Comú Podem–En Marea (65)	Terrón Berbel, Ana Belén	Granada	2016/01/13	2016/05/03
Podemos–En Comú Podem–En Marea (65)	Vera Ruiz-Herrera, Noelia	Cádiz	2016/01/13	2016/05/03
Podemos–En Comú Podem–En Marea (65)	Vila Gómez, Miguel	Burgos	2016/01/13	2016/05/03
Podemos–En Comú Podem–En Marea (65)	Yllanes Suárez, Juan Pedro	Balearic Islands	2016/01/13	2016/05/03
Podemos–En Comú Podem–En Marea (65)	Alonso Cantorné, Félix	Tarragona	2016/01/13	2016/05/03
Podemos–En Comú Podem–En Marea (65)	Domènech Sampere, Francesc Xavier	Barcelona	2016/01/13	2016/05/03
Podemos–En Comú Podem–En Marea (65)	Expósito Prieto, Marcelo	Barcelona	2016/01/13	2016/05/03
Podemos–En Comú Podem–En Marea (65)	García Puig, María del Mar	Barcelona	2016/01/13	2016/05/03
Podemos–En Comú Podem–En Marea (65)	Martín González, Lucía	Barcelona	2016/01/13	2016/05/03
Podemos–En Comú Podem–En Marea (65)	Mena Arca, Joan Miquel	Barcelona	2016/01/13	2016/05/03
Podemos–En Comú Podem–En Marea (65)	Moya Matas, Jaume	Lleida	2016/01/13	2016/05/03
Podemos–En Comú Podem–En Marea (65)	Sibina Camps, Marta	Barcelona	2016/01/13	2016/05/03
Podemos–En Comú Podem–En Marea (65)	Terradas Viñals, Dolors	Girona	2016/01/13	2016/05/03
Podemos–En Comú Podem–En Marea (65)	Vendrell Gardeñes, Josep	Barcelona	2016/01/13	2016/05/03
Podemos–En Comú Podem–En Marea (65)	Vidal Sáez, Aina	Barcelona	2016/01/13	2016/05/03
Podemos–En Comú Podem–En Marea (65)	Viejo Viñas, Raimundo	Barcelona	2016/01/13	2016/05/03
Podemos–En Comú Podem–En Marea (65)	Bruzos Higuero, David	Ourense	2016/01/13	2016/05/03
Podemos–En Comú Podem–En Marea (65)	Díaz Pérez, Yolanda	A Coruña	2016/01/13	2016/05/03
Podemos–En Comú Podem–En Marea (65)	Fernández Bello, Miguel Anxo Elías	Lugo	2016/01/13	2016/05/03
Podemos–En Comú Podem–En Marea (65)	Fernández Gómez, Alexandra	Pontevedra	2016/01/13	2016/05/03
Podemos–En Comú Podem–En Marea (65)	Gómez-Reino Varela, Antonio	A Coruña	2016/01/13	2016/05/03
Podemos–En Comú Podem–En Marea (65)	Rodríguez Martínez, Ángela	Pontevedra	2016/01/13	2016/05/03
Podemos–En Comú Podem–En Marea (65)	Ballester Muñoz, Ángela	Valencia	2016/01/13	2016/05/03
Podemos–En Comú Podem–En Marea (65)	Bosaho Gori, Rita Gertrudis	Alicante	2016/01/13	2016/05/03
Podemos–En Comú Podem–En Marea (65)	Guijarro García, Txema	Valencia	2016/01/13	2016/05/03
Podemos–En Comú Podem–En Marea (65)	Martínez Dalmau, Rubén	Alicante	2016/01/13	2016/05/03
Podemos–En Comú Podem–En Marea (65)	Pastor Muñoz, Rosana	Valencia	2016/01/13	2016/05/03
Podemos–En Comú Podem–En Marea (65)	López de Uralde Garmendia, Juan Antonio	Álava	2016/01/13	2016/05/03
Podemos–En Comú Podem–En Marea (65)	Luis Bail, Jorge	Huesca	2016/01/13	2016/05/03
Podemos–En Comú Podem–En Marea (65)	Martínez Rodríguez, María Rosa	Biscay	2016/01/13	2016/05/03
Citizens-Party of the Citizenry (40)	Bueno Prado, Enrique	León	2016/01/13	2016/05/03
Citizens-Party of the Citizenry (40)	Calle Fuentes, José Antonio	Málaga	2016/01/13	2016/05/03
Citizens-Party of the Citizenry (40)	Cano Fuster, José	Alicante	2016/01/13	2016/05/03
Citizens-Party of the Citizenry (40)	Cano Leal, Francisco Javier	Cádiz	2016/01/13	2016/05/03
Citizens-Party of the Citizenry (40)	Cantó García del Moral, Antonio	Valencia	2016/01/13	2016/05/03
Citizens-Party of the Citizenry (40)	Clemente Giménez, Diego	Almería	2016/01/13	2016/05/03
Citizens-Party of the Citizenry (40)	De la Torre Díaz, Francisco	Madrid	2016/01/13	2016/05/03
Citizens-Party of the Citizenry (40)	Del Campo Estaún, Sergio	Tarragona	2016/01/13	2016/05/03
Citizens-Party of the Citizenry (40)	Faba de la Encarnación, Elena	Barcelona	2016/01/13	2016/05/03
Citizens-Party of the Citizenry (40)	Garaulet Rodríguez, Miguel Ángel	Murcia	2016/01/13	2016/05/03
Citizens-Party of the Citizenry (40)	Girauta Vidal, Juan Carlos	Barcelona	2016/01/13	2016/05/03
Citizens-Party of the Citizenry (40)	Gómez Balsera, Marcial	Córdoba	2016/01/13	2016/05/03
Citizens-Party of the Citizenry (40)	Gómez García, Rodrigo	Zaragoza	2016/01/13	2016/05/03
Citizens-Party of the Citizenry (40)	González Martínez, Onésimo Eduardo	Albacete	2016/01/13	2016/05/03
Citizens-Party of the Citizenry (40)	Gutiérrez Vivas, Miguel Ángel	Madrid	2016/01/13	2016/05/03
Citizens-Party of the Citizenry (40)	Hervías Chirosa, Francisco Javier	Madrid	2016/01/13	2016/05/03
Citizens-Party of the Citizenry (40)	Igea Arisqueta, Francisco	Valladolid	2016/01/13	2016/05/03
Citizens-Party of the Citizenry (40)	Lorenzo Rodríguez, Domingo	Castellón	2016/01/13	2016/05/03
Citizens-Party of the Citizenry (40)	Martín Llaguno, Marta	Alicante	2016/01/13	2016/05/03
Citizens-Party of the Citizenry (40)	Martínez González, José Luis	Murcia	2016/01/13	2016/05/03
Citizens-Party of the Citizenry (40)	Maura Barandiarán, Fernando	Madrid	2016/01/13	2016/05/03
Citizens-Party of the Citizenry (40)	Miguel Muñoz, Orlena María	Guadalajara	2016/01/13	2016/05/03
Citizens-Party of the Citizenry (40)	Millán Salmerón, María Virginia	Seville	2016/01/13	2016/05/03
Citizens-Party of the Citizenry (40)	Molinary Malo, Ramón Luis	Toledo	2016/01/13	2016/05/03
Citizens-Party of the Citizenry (40)	Navarro Fernández-Rodríguez, Fernando	Balearic Islands	2016/01/13	2016/05/03
Citizens-Party of the Citizenry (40)	Pracht Ferrer, Carlos	Cantabria	2016/01/13	2016/05/03
Citizens-Party of the Citizenry (40)	Prendes Prendes, José Ignacio	Asturias	2016/01/13	2016/05/03
Citizens-Party of the Citizenry (40)	Prieto Romero, Fidel	Seville	2016/01/13	2016/05/03
Citizens-Party of the Citizenry (40)	Ramírez Freire, Saúl	Las Palmas	2016/01/13	2016/05/03
Citizens-Party of the Citizenry (40)	Reyes Rivera, Patricia Isaura	Madrid	2016/01/13	2016/05/03
Citizens-Party of the Citizenry (40)	Rivera Andrés, Irene	Málaga	2016/01/13	2016/05/03
Citizens-Party of the Citizenry (40)	Rivera de la Cruz, Marta María	Madrid	2016/01/13	2016/05/03
Citizens-Party of the Citizenry (40)	Rivera Díaz, Albert	Madrid	2016/01/13	2016/05/03
Citizens-Party of the Citizenry (40)	Rodríguez Hernández, Melisa	Santa Cruz de Tenerife	2016/01/13	2016/05/03
Citizens-Party of the Citizenry (40)	Rodríguez Vázquez, Antonio	A Coruña	2016/01/13	2016/05/03
Citizens-Party of the Citizenry (40)	Roldán Monés, Antonio	Barcelona	2016/01/13	2016/05/03
Citizens-Party of the Citizenry (40)	Salvador García, Luis Miguel	Granada	2016/01/13	2016/05/03
Citizens-Party of the Citizenry (40)	Ten Oliver, Vicente	Valencia	2016/01/13	2016/05/03
Citizens-Party of the Citizenry (40)	Villegas Pérez, José Manuel	Barcelona	2016/01/13	2016/05/03
Citizens-Party of the Citizenry (40)	Yáñez González, Pablo	Salamanca	2016/01/13	2016/05/03
Republican Left of Catalonia (9)	Capdevila i Esteve, Joan	Barcelona	2016/01/13	2016/05/03
Republican Left of Catalonia (9)	Capella i Farré, Ester	Barcelona	2016/01/13	2016/05/03
Republican Left of Catalonia (9)	Eritja Ciuró, Francesc Xavier	Lleida	2016/01/13	2016/05/03
Republican Left of Catalonia (9)	Jordà i Roura, Teresa	Girona	2016/01/13	2016/05/03
Republican Left of Catalonia (9)	Olòriz Serra, Joan Baptista	Girona	2016/01/13	2016/05/03
Republican Left of Catalonia (9)	Rufián Romero, Gabriel	Barcelona	2016/01/13	2016/05/03
Republican Left of Catalonia (9)	Salvador i Duch, Jordi	Tarragona	2016/01/13	2016/05/03
Republican Left of Catalonia (9)	Surra Spadea, Ana María	Barcelona	2016/01/13	2016/05/03
Republican Left of Catalonia (9)	Tardà i Coma, Joan	Barcelona	2016/01/13	2016/05/03
Democracy and Freedom (8)	Bel Accensi, Ferran	Tarragona	2016/01/13	2016/05/03
Democracy and Freedom (8)	Campuzano i Canadés, Carles	Barcelona	2016/01/13	2016/05/03
Democracy and Freedom (8)	Ciuró i Buldó, Lourdes	Barcelona	2016/01/13	2016/05/03
Democracy and Freedom (8)	Homs Molist, Francesc	Barcelona	2016/01/13	2016/05/03
Democracy and Freedom (8)	Nogueras i Camero, Miriam	Barcelona	2016/01/13	2016/05/03
Democracy and Freedom (8)	Postius Terrado, Antoni	Lleida	2016/01/13	2016/05/03
Democracy and Freedom (8)	Xuclà i Costa, Jordi	Lleida	2016/01/13	2016/05/03
Democracy and Freedom (8)	Ribera i Garijo, Elena	Girona	2016/01/13	2016/05/03
Basque Nationalist Party (6)	Agirretxea Urresti, Joseba Andoni	Gipuzkoa	2016/01/13	2016/05/03
Basque Nationalist Party (6)	Ardanza Uribarren, María Pilar	Biscay	2016/01/13	2016/05/03
Basque Nationalist Party (6)	Azpiazu Uriarte, Pedro María	Biscay	2016/01/13	2016/05/03
Basque Nationalist Party (6)	Barandiaran Benito, Íñigo	Gipuzkoa	2016/01/13	2016/05/03
Basque Nationalist Party (6)	Esteban Bravo, Aitor	Biscay	2016/01/13	2016/05/03
Basque Nationalist Party (6)	Legarda Uriarte, Mikel	Álava	2016/01/13	2016/05/03
Mixed Group (14)	Baldoví Roda, Joan	Valencia	2016/01/13	2016/05/03
Mixed Group (14)	Bataller i Ruiz, Enric	Valencia	2016/01/13	2016/05/03
Mixed Group (14)	Candela Serna, Ignasi	Valencia	2016/01/13	2016/05/03
Mixed Group (14)	Sorlí Fresquet, Marta	Castellón	2016/01/13	2016/05/03
Mixed Group (14)	Garzón Espinosa, Alberto	Madrid	2016/01/13	2016/05/03
Mixed Group (14)	Sánchez Maroto, Sol	Madrid	2016/01/13	2016/05/03
Mixed Group (14)	Beitialarrangoitia Lizarralde, Marian	Gipuzkoa	2016/01/13	2016/05/03
Mixed Group (14)	Enbeita Maguregi, Onintza	Biscay	2016/01/13	2016/05/03
Mixed Group (14)	Alli Martínez, Íñigo Jesús	Navarre	2016/01/13	2016/05/03
Mixed Group (14)	Salvador Armendáriz, Carlos Casimiro	Navarre	2016/01/13	2016/05/03
Mixed Group (14)	Oramas González-Moro, Ana María	Santa Cruz de Tenerife	2016/01/13	2016/05/03
Mixed Group (14)	Martínez Oblanca, Isidro Manuel	Asturias	2016/01/13	2016/05/03
Mixed Group (14)	Quevedo Iturbe, Pedro	Las Palmas	2016/01/13	2016/05/03
Mixed Group (14)	Gómez de la Serna y Villacieros, Pedro Ramón	Segovia	2016/01/13	2016/05/03

== Senate ==
=== Composition ===
Parliamentary Group		Jan 2016
Party Groups	People's Party; People's Party; Aragonese Party	142; 140; 2
Party Groups	Spanish Socialist Workers' Party; Spanish Socialist Workers' Party; Socialists' Party of Catalonia	67; 66; 1
Party Groups	Podemos–En Comú–Compromís–Marea; Podemos; En Comú Podem; Compromís; En Marea	23; 13; 5; 3; 2
Party Groups	Republican Left of Catalonia	8
Party Groups	Democracy and Freedom; Democratic Convergence of Catalonia; Democrats of Catalonia	8; 7; 1
Party Groups	Basque Nationalist Party	7
Mixed Group	Citizens-Party of the Citizenry	3
Mixed Group	Gomera Socialist Group	1
Mixed Group	Geroa Bai	1
Mixed Group	Canarian Coalition	1
Mixed Group	Navarrese People's Union	1
Mixed Group	Asturias Forum	1
Mixed Group	Independent Herrenian Group	1
Mixed Group	EH Bildu	1
Total		265
