= Jaime Mateu Istúriz =

Spanish politician

Jaime Miguel Mateu Istúriz

Member of the Congress of Deputies
- In office 2015–present
- Preceded by: Juan Carlos Aparicio
- Constituency: Burgos

Personal details
- Born: June 5, 1971 (age 54) Spain
- Party: People's Party (PP)
- Profession: Politician

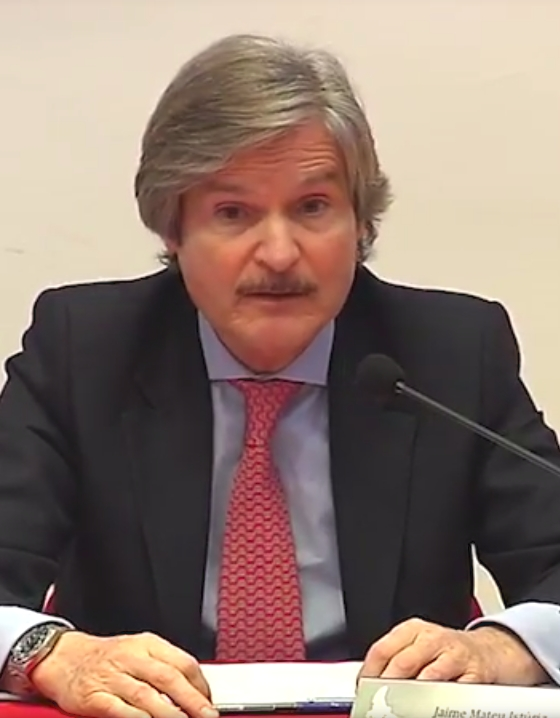
Jaime Mateu Istúriz

Jaime Miguel Mateu Istúriz (born June 5, 1971) is a Spanish politician and member of the People's Party (PP).

== Biography ==
He was placed in the first position on the senatorial ticket presented by the party in the Burgos constituency. He served on the Defense, Interior, and Economy and Competitiveness Committees and was appointed as the spokesperson on the Equipment Committee.

In the 2015 general election, he was appointed as the head of the PP list in the Burgos constituency, replacing former minister Juan Carlos Aparicio. Elected to the Congress of Deputies alongside his colleague Sandra Moneo, he joined the Equipment Committee, the Road Safety Committee, and the bicameral National Security Committee. He was also chosen for the institutional position of Second Vice President of the Interior Committee.

He ran for a new term in the 2016 general election. He was then confirmed in his parliamentary responsibilities, but left the vice-presidency of the Interior Committee in April 2018 when he took the chair of the new non-permanent committee on the Study of the Police Model for the 21st Century.
