= Joan Mena Arca =

Spanish politician

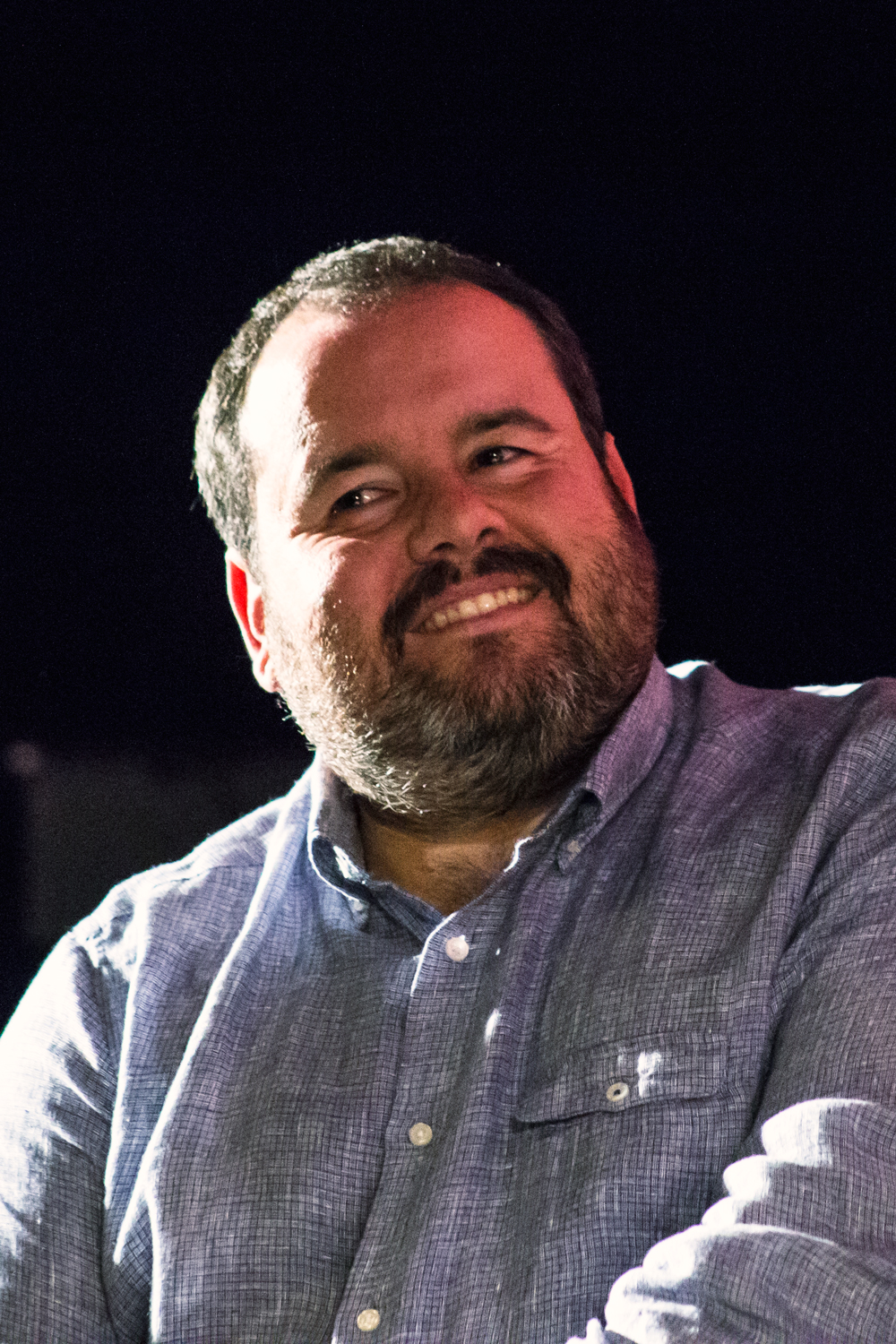
Joan Miquel Mena Arca

Joan Miquel Mena Arca (Sabadell, October 24, 1975) is a Spanish politician, member of Esquerra Unida Catalunya, and a deputy in the Parliament of Catalonia during the 10th legislature, as well as in the Congress during the 11th, 12th, 13th, and 14th legislatures. During the 14th legislature, he chaired the Congress’s Science Committee.

== Early life and education ==
Joan Mena Arca holds a degree in Hispanic philology (specializing in sociolinguistics) from the Autonomous University of Barcelona.

== Career ==
He was president of the Torre-Romeu Neighborhood Association, between 2004 and 2007, and was a member of the Federation of Neighborhood Associations of Sabadell. During these years, the Association launched a campaign to demand the arrival of the railway in the neighborhood, along with the Sabadell Cruïlla entity, and advocated for the construction of a sports facility in the neighborhood.

Mena has been part of the political party Esquerra Unida i Alternativa since its founding in 1998, where he was active in the Sabadell Local Assembly from its inception until 2019. He was a member of the Partit dels Comunistes de Catalunya and a founding member of Comunistes de Catalunya.

Mena was part of the National Council of EUiA, the Federal Political Council of Izquierda Unida, and is a member of the Education Working Group of the Party of the European Left. In this European Working Group, he has conducted studies on the education systems of different European Union countries. In EUiA, Mena was responsible for the Education Sector until he was elected deputy to the Parliament of Catalonia.

He was elected a councilor in the Sabadell City Council for the ICV coalition on May 27, 2007, along with fellow councilors Carmen García Suárez, José María Matencio, and María del Sol Martínez. In the next term (2011–2015), Joan Mena was re-elected as a councilor in the Sabadell City Council for the ICV coalition, alongside fellow councilors Carme García, Carlés Marlés, and María del Sol Martínez. The complaint by the municipal group of the ICV-EUiA coalition in the Sabadell City Council exposed the Mercurio case, a political corruption case involving the PSC and the former mayor of Sabadell, Manuel Bustos.

In the 2012 Catalan regional election, Joan Mena was elected deputy to the Parliament of Catalonia for the ICV-EUiA coalition, as the lead candidate of the EUiA formation, replacing the previous deputy Jordi Miralles. Mena served as the deputy spokesperson for the ICV-EUiA Parliamentary Group and participated, alongside Joan Herrera, in the conversations and summits on Catalonia's Right to Decide that led to the agreement to hold the 9N referendum. Additionally, he followed matters of education, commerce, business, and employment and served as a rapporteur on laws regarding business hours, industrial safety, and transparency.

On July 21, 2015, he announced that he would not run in the next Catalan parliamentary elections.

For the 2015 Spanish general election, he was proposed as a candidate on the list for the Barcelona constituency of the left-wing coalition En Comú Podem, and was elected deputy for the 11th legislature, a position he renewed in the subsequent elections for the 12th legislature.

After learning that members of EUiA had launched a political project called Sobiranistes, which would run in the April 2019 Spanish general election in coalition with Esquerra Republicana de Catalunya under the name Esquerra Republicana de Catalunya-Sobiranistes, Joan Mena, along with many EUiA members, joined the new Esquerra Unida Catalunya.

On November 22, 2019, Joan Mena was one of 200 members of Comunistes de Catalunya who left the party due to its rapprochement with ERC.
