= José Luis Ayllón =

Spanish lawyer and politician

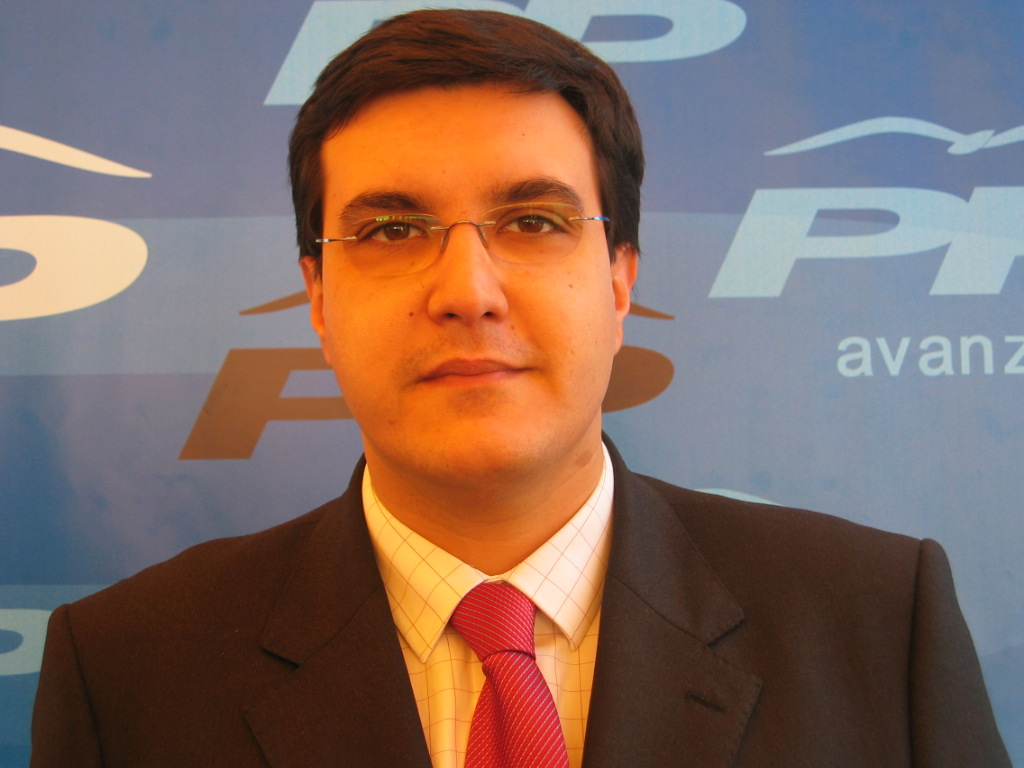

Director of the Cabinet of the Presidency of the Government
- In office January 26, 2018 – June 8, 2018
- President: Mariano Rajoy
- Preceded by: Jorge Moragas
- Succeeded by: Iván Redondo

Secretary of State for Relations with the Spanish Parliament
- In office December 26, 2011 – January 26, 2018
- President: Mariano Rajoy
- Preceded by: José Luis de Francisco
- Succeeded by: Rubén Moreno Palanques

Member of the Spanish Parliament
- In office October 23, 2001 – May 21, 2019

Personal details
- Born: July 5, 1970 (age 55) Barcelona, Spain
- Party: PP
- Occupation: Lawyer and politician

José Luis Ayllón Manso (July 5, 1970, Barcelona, Spain) is a Spanish lawyer and politician. Between January and June 2018 he was director of the Cabinet of the Presidency of the Government, Mariano Rajoy.

Previously, between 2011 and 2018 he was Secretary of State for Relations with the Cortes in the Ministry of the Presidency, and between October 2001 and May 2019 he was a deputy for Barcelona for the People's Party (PP).

== Biography ==
He graduated in law from the University of Barcelona. While studying, he worked at La Caixa from 1988 to 1992. After finishing his law degree, he worked as a lawyer between 1993 and 1996 at the law firms Garrigues and Abogados y Asesores Tributarios.

Initiated into politics from a young age, he is a member of the People's Party, of whose New Generations in Catalonia he became president between 1997 and 2000.

In 2001 he moved to Madrid to serve as an advisor to Prime Minister José María Aznar.

After the 2004 general elections, and until 2008, he served as National Secretary of Communication of the PP.

He was a member of parliament during the VII and VIII Legislatures, and in the IX Legislature, he served as the Secretary General of the Popular Parliamentary Group. Reelected as a member of parliament for Barcelona in the X Legislature, on December 23, 2011, he was appointed Secretary of State for Relations with the Courts in the Ministry of the Presidency.

On January 26, 2018, he was appointed by the Council of Ministers as the Director of the Cabinet of the Prime Minister, replacing Jorge Moragas. However, a few months later, following the vote of no confidence against Pedro Sánchez, he was replaced by Iván Redondo on June 8 of the same year. He continued serving as a member of parliament in the Congress until the end of the legislative term in April 2019.

He definitively left politics in April 2019 to devote himself to the private sphere: he signed up with the communications consultancy LLYC (the former Llorente & Cuenca), led by José Antonio Llorente.
