= Guillermo Antonio Meijón Couselo =

Spanish teacher, writer, and politician

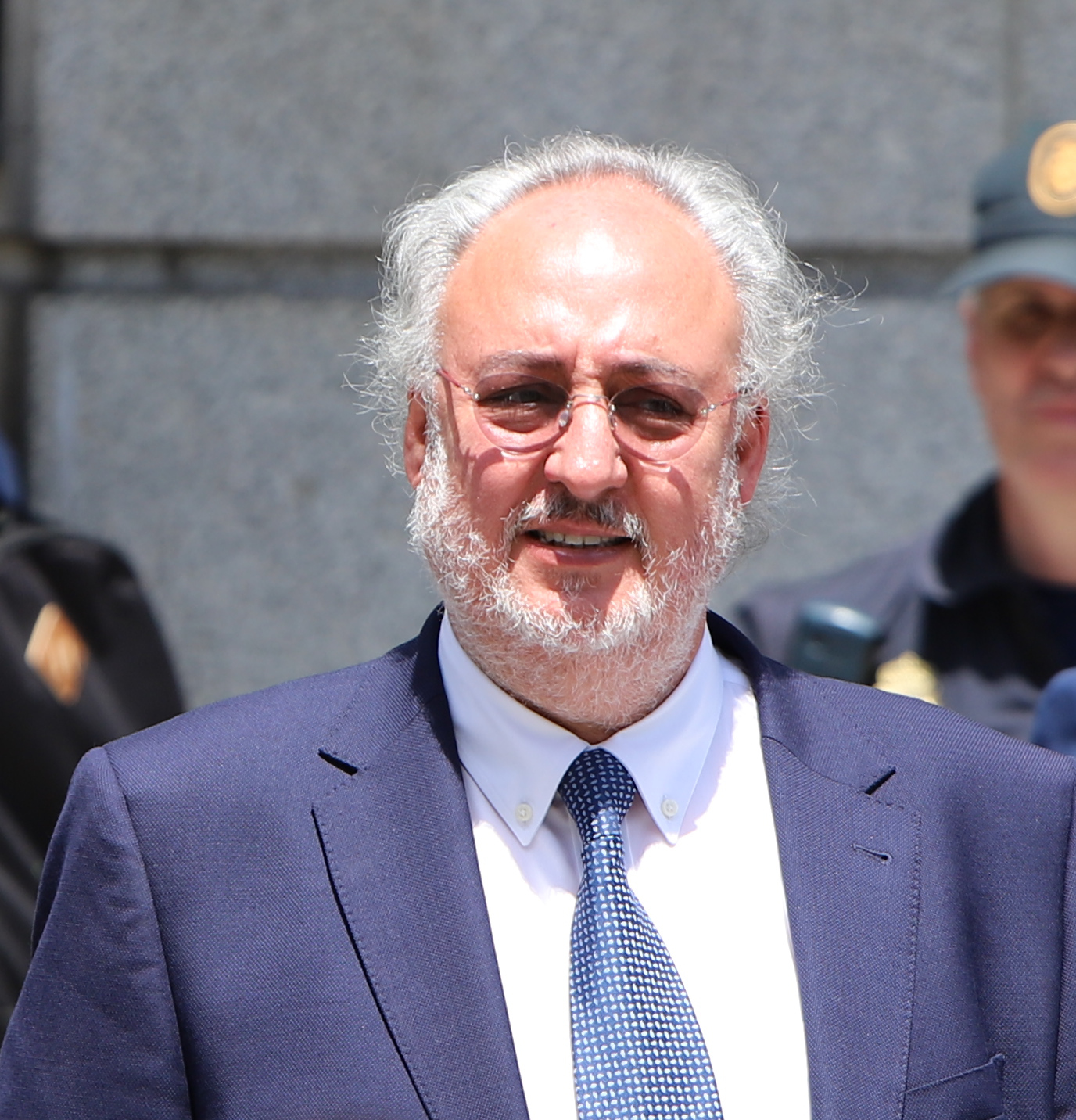
- Guillermo Meijón in 2020

Member of Parliament in the Cortes Generales
- Incumbent
- Assumed office 20 November 2011
- Constituency: Pontevedra

President of the COVID-19 Vaccination Plan Investigation Committee
- Incumbent
- Assumed office 24 June 2021

Deputy Spokesperson of the Socialist Group in the Congress of Deputies
- Incumbent
- Assumed office 21 May 2019

Vice President of the Budget Committee
- Incumbent
- Assumed office 30 July 2019

Vice President of the Education and Vocational Training Committee
- In office 10 February 2016 – 5 March 2019

Spokesperson for Universities of the Socialist Group in the Congress of Deputies
- In office 2015–2015

Ideologue and Speaker in the Cortes Generales of the LOMLOE

Member of Parliament in the Parliament of Galicia
- In office 19 June 2005 – 20 November 2011
- Constituency: Pontevedra

Spokesperson for Education of the Socialist Group in the Parliament of Galicia
- In office 19 June 2005 – 20 November 2011

Councillor of the Pontevedra City Council
- In office 13 June 1999 – 19 June 2005

Personal details
- Born: 14 March 1957 (68) Pontevedra, Spain
- Political party: Spanish Socialist Workers' Party
- Education: UNED and University of Santiago de Compostela
- Profession: Teacher, politician and writer

Guillermo Antonio Meijón Couselo (born 14 March 1958) is a Spanish teacher, writer, and politician, member of parliament for Pontevedra in the Congress of Deputies during the 10th, 11th, 12th, 13th, and 14th legislatures.

== Biography ==
He studied at the Marist School Santa María in Ourense. After permanently returning with his family to Pontevedra, he began his studies in Philosophy and Educational Sciences at the UNED, where he obtained his degree.

Since 1979, he worked professionally as a teacher and school counselor, although he has been on leave of absence since 2005 under the Special Services Commission. As a member of FETE-UGT, he has held various positions and was a member of the leadership in Galicia.

He was a councillor in the Pontevedra City Council between 1999 and 2005. That year he ran on the socialist list for the Parliament of Galicia and was elected member of parliament for Pontevedra, a position for which he was re-elected in 2009. In the 2011 general elections, he was elected member of parliament for Pontevedra in the Congress, and re-elected in 2015, 2016, and 2019.
