= María Luz Martínez Seijo =

Spanish politician (born 1968)

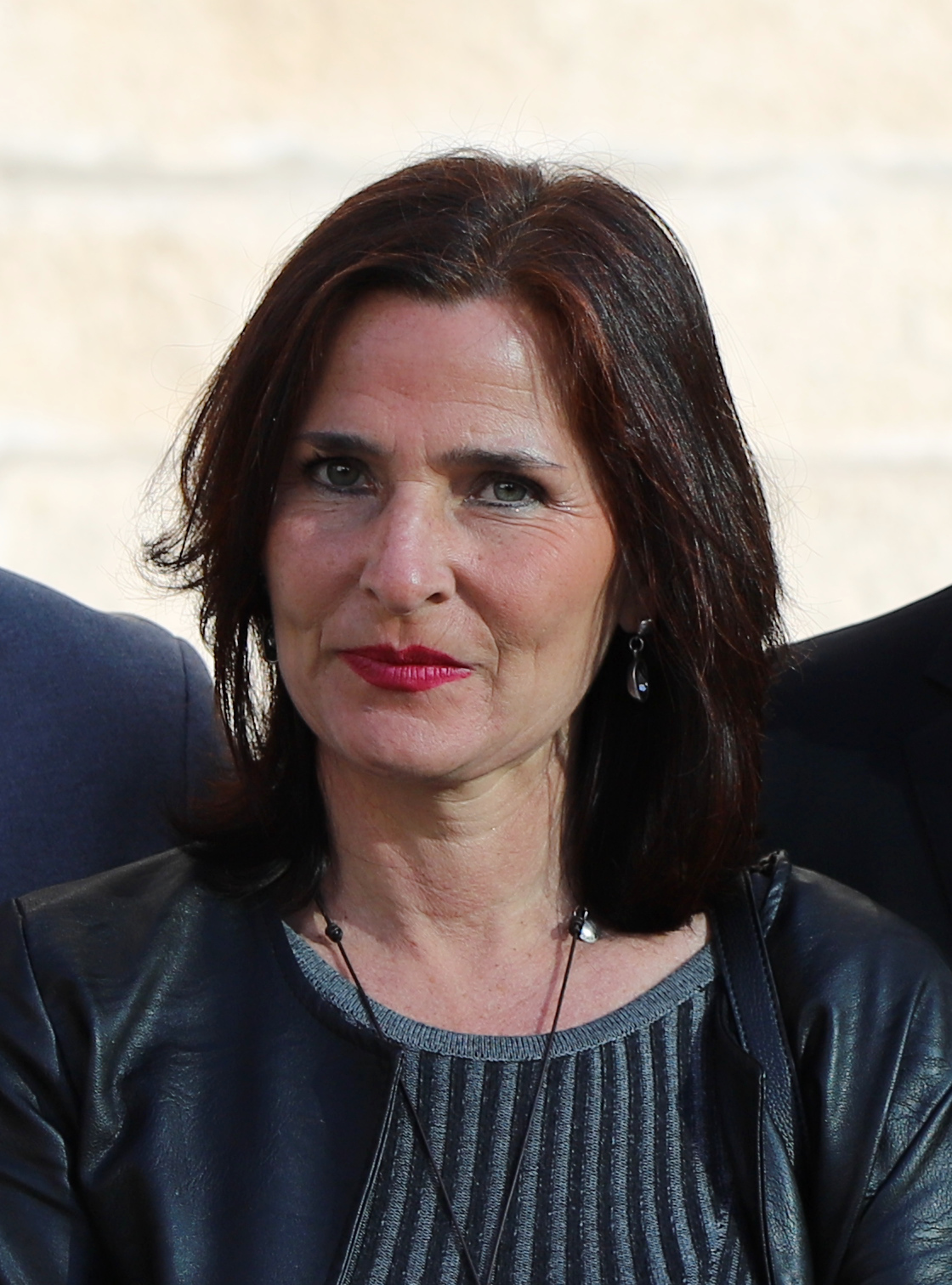
- Martínez Seijo in 2020

Member of the Congress of Deputies
- Incumbent
- Assumed office 13 January 2016
- Constituency: Palencia

Personal details
- Born: 10 November 1968 (age 57)
- Party: Spanish Socialist Workers' Party

María Luz Martínez Seijo (born 10 November 1968) is a Spanish politician serving as a member of the Congress of Deputies since 2016. She has been a member of the Parliamentary Assembly of the Council of Europe since 2022.
