= David Serrada =

Spanish politician (born 1977)

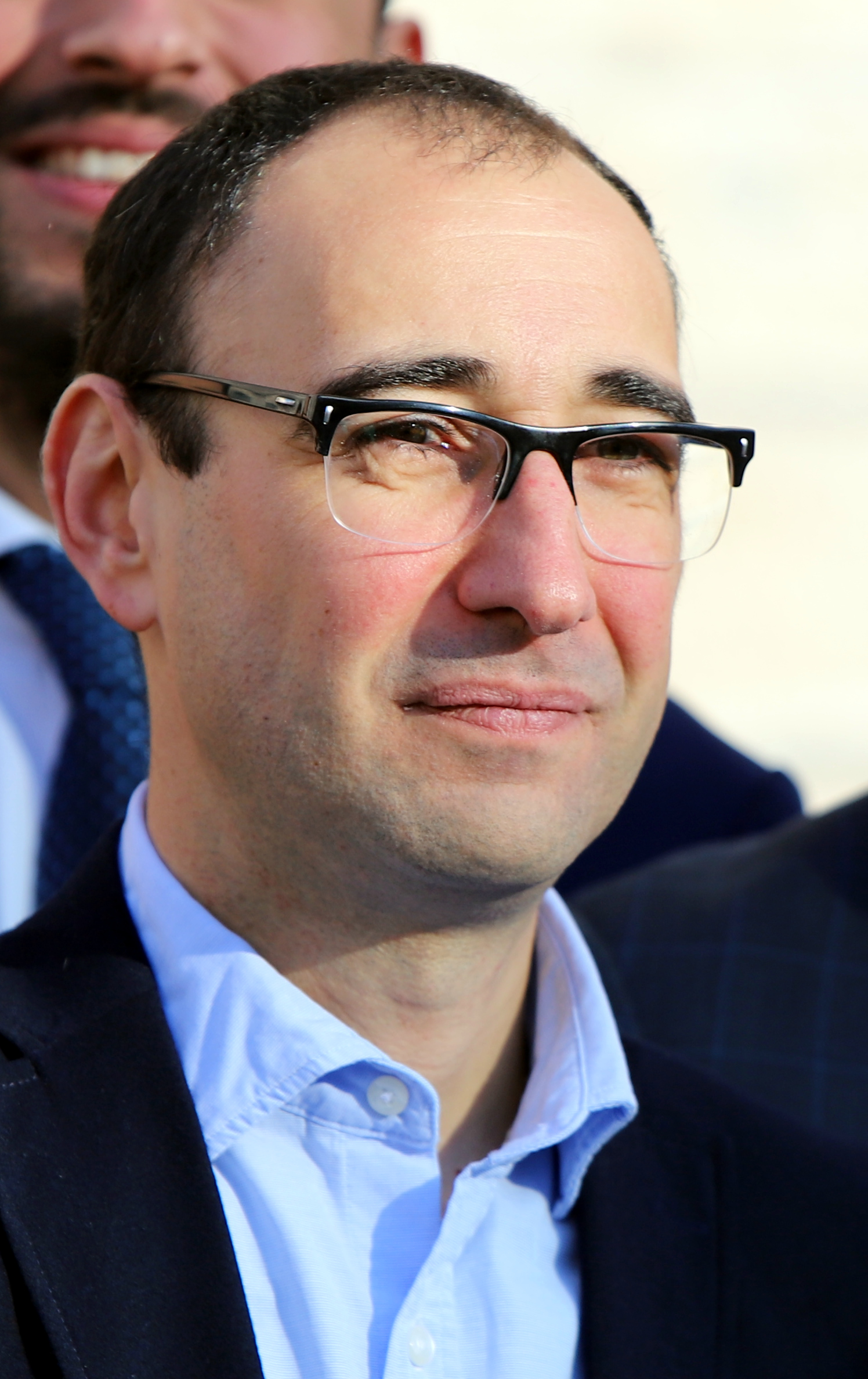
- Serrada in 2020

Member of the Congress of Deputies
- Incumbent
- Assumed office 13 January 2016
- Constituency: Salamanca

Personal details
- Born: 3 December 1977 (age 48)
- Party: Spanish Socialist Workers' Party

David Serrada Pariente (born 3 December 1977) is a Spanish politician serving as a member of the Congress of Deputies since 2016. He has served as secretary general of the Spanish Socialist Workers' Party in the province of Salamanca since 2021.
