= Toni Postius =

Spanish politician (born 1984)

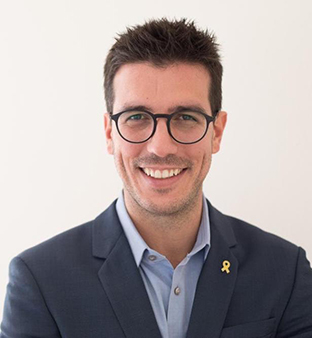
- Postius in October 2019

Member of the Congress of Deputies of Spain
- In office 28 December 2015 – 5 March 2019
- Constituency: Lleida

Member of Lleida Municipal Council
- Incumbent
- Assumed office 2011

Personal details
- Born: Antoni Postius i Terrado; 11 August 1984 (age 42) Lleida, Catalonia, Spain
- Party: Catalan European Democratic Party
- Other political affiliations: Together for Catalonia
- Education: University of Lleida
- Website: tonipostius.cat

Antoni Postius i Terrado (born 11 August 1984) is a Catalan politician and a former member of the Congress of Deputies of Spain.

== Early life ==
Postius was born on 11 August 1984 in Lleida, Catalonia. He was educated at the Joan XXIII and Joc de la Bola public schools and IES Ronda. He has a degree in law from the University of Lleida. He also spent a year at University College Vitus Bering in Horsens, Denmark. He has a degree in law and is a member of the bar association in Lleida. He was head of the local branch of the Nationalist Youth of Catalonia (JNC) (2006–08), president of JNC in Lleida (2008–10) and a member of the JNC's National Executive Committee.

== Career ==
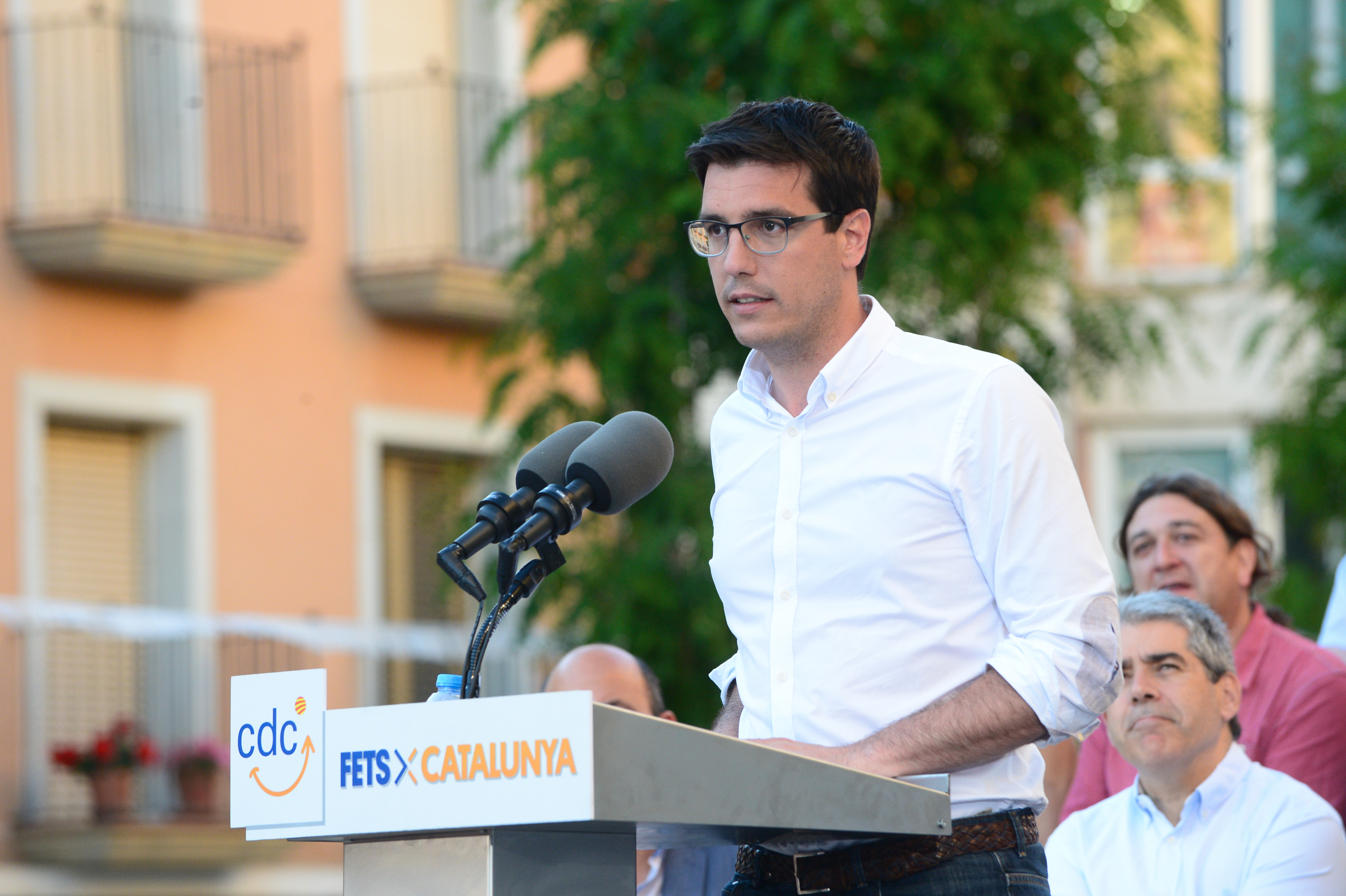
Postius addresses the CDC's "Acte a Cervera" event on 22 June 2016

Postius is a computer engineer and was a co-owner of a computer company before joining the family business, Tintorerías Postius.

Postius contested the 2011 local elections as a Convergence and Union (CiU) electoral alliance candidate in Lleida and was elected. He was re-elected at the 2015 local elections.

Postius contested the 2015 general election as a Democracy and Freedom (DiL) electoral alliance candidate in the Province of Lleida and was elected to the Congress of Deputies. He was re-elected at the 2016 general election.

Postius is the Catalan European Democratic Party (PDeCAT)'s mayoral candidate in Lleida at the 2019 local elections. He contested the 2019 local elections as a Together for Catalonia (JxCat) candidate in Lleida and was re-elected though he did not become mayor.

== Electoral history ==
Electoral history of Toni Postius
| Election | Constituency | Party | Alliance | No. | Result |
|---|---|---|---|---|---|
| 2011 local | Lleida | Democratic Convergence of Catalonia | Convergence and Union | 6 | Elected |
| 2015 local | Lleida | Democratic Convergence of Catalonia | Convergence and Union | 1 | Elected |
| 2015 general | Province of Lleida | Democratic Convergence of Catalonia | Democracy and Freedom | 1 | Elected |
| 2016 general | Province of Lleida | Democratic Convergence of Catalonia | | 1 | Elected |
| 2019 local | Lleida | Catalan European Democratic Party | Together for Catalonia | 1 | Elected |
