= Raimundo Viejo =

Spanish activist, university professor and politician

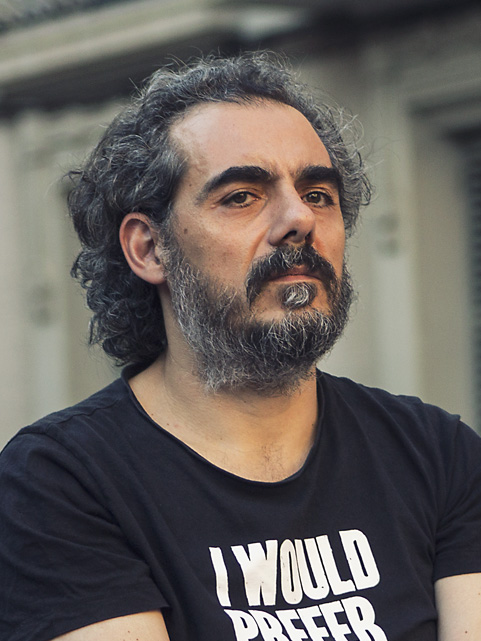

Deputy in the XI legislature of the Cortes Generales
- Incumbent
- Assumed office 2015

Personal details
- Born: August 15, 1969 (age 55); Vigo, Spain
- Political party: Barcelona en Comú
- Occupation: Politician,

Raimundo Viejo Viñas (born August 15, 1969, in Vigo, Spain) is a Spanish activist, university professor, editor, and politician. He served as a councilor for the City Council of Barcelona in 2015 and as a deputy in the XI legislature of the Cortes Generales.

== Biography ==
Born in Vigo on August 15, 1969, Raimundo Viejo Viñas had a maternal grandfather who was one of the founders of Editorial Galaxia, while his father was a mining engineer and his mother, a high school teacher. He earned a degree in Geography and History from the University of Santiago and completed his doctorate in Political Science at the University of Humboldt. Viejo, who relocated to Barcelona in 2005, is a professor at the University of Girona and an editor at Artefakte. He was among the signatories of the manifesto "Mover Ficha" that led to the inception of Podemos, subsequently joining the party's national governing body in November 2014.

Ranked sixth on the Barcelona en Comú candidacy in the municipal elections of 2015, Raimundo Viejo Viñas was elected councilor of the City Council of Barcelona. He assumed the position overseeing the City Council's Education department and served as the representative for the Gracia district.

Viejo later resigned from his councilor position to run as a candidate for deputy representing the electoral constituency of Barcelona on the En Comú Podem coalition list for the general elections of 2015, and he was elected as a member of parliament.
