= Ricardo Tarno =

Spanish politician (born 1966)

Member of the Congress of Deputies
- Incumbent
- Assumed office 2 December 2021
- Preceded by: Teresa Jiménez-Becerril
- Constituency: Seville
- In office 1 April 2008 – 21 May 2019
- Constituency: Seville

Personal details
- Born: 20 May 1966 (age 60)
- Party: People's Party

Ricardo Tarno Blanco (born 20 May 1966) is a Spanish politician. He has been a member of the Congress of Deputies since 2021, having previously served from 2008 to 2019. From 2011 to 2015, he served as mayor of Mairena del Aljarafe.
