= Concepción de Santa Ana =

Spanish politician (born 1973)

Member of the Congress of Deputies
- In office 1 April 2008 – 5 March 2019
- Constituency: Granada

Personal details
- Born: 18 January 1973 (age 53)
- Party: People's Party

María de la Concepción de Santa Ana Fernández (born 18 January 1973) is a Spanish politician. From 2008 to 2019, she was a member of the Congress of Deputies. From 2016 to 2019, she was a member of the Parliamentary Assembly of the Council of Europe.
