= José Alberto Martín-Toledano =

Spanish politician (1963–2024)

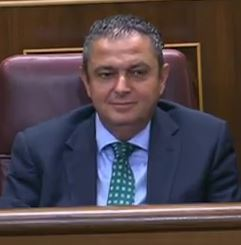
- Martín-Toledano

Member of the Congress of Deputies for Ciudad Real
- In office 3 December 2011 – 5 March 2019

Personal details
- Born: José Alberto Martín-Toledano Suárez; 26 February 1963 Malagón, Spain
- Died: 6 April 2024 (aged 61) Madrid, Spain
- Party: PP
- Education: Universidad CEU San Pablo
- Occupation: Lawyer

José Alberto Martín-Toledano Suárez (26 February 1963 – 6 April 2024) was a Spanish lawyer and politician. A member of the People's Party, he served in the Congress of Deputies from 2011 to 2019.

Martín-Toledano died on 6 April 2024, at the age of 61.
