= Lucía Martín =

Spanish politician and feminist activist

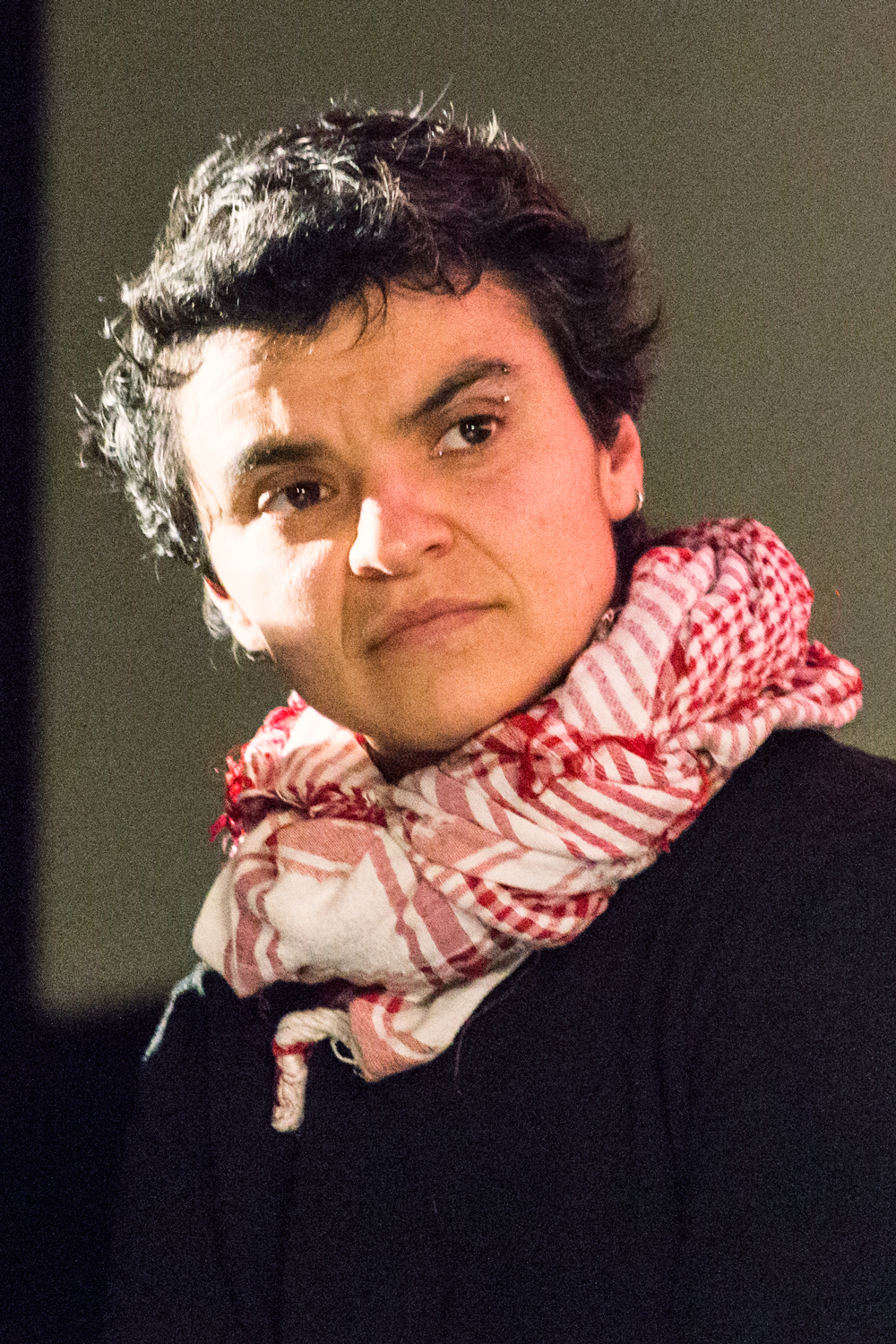

Member of the Congress of Deputies
- In office 20 December 2015 – 28 April 2019
- Constituency: Barcelona

Member of the City Council of Barcelona
- Incumbent
- Assumed office 26 May 2019

Personal details
- Born: Lucía Martín González; 15 January 1979 (age 47) Lugo, Spain
- Party: En Comú Podem
- Occupation: Politician

Lucía Martín González (born 15 January 1979) is a Spanish engineer and politician. She was a deputy for Barcelona in the eleventh and twelfth Legislature.

== Early life and career ==
Martín was born on 15 January 1979 in Lugo. She graduated in chemical engineering and she has doctoral studies in Environmental Sciences. She has worked in inspecting waste treatment plants and studied biological processes to remove contaminants from the environment. She settled in Terrasa, she participated in protest activities at the Ateneo Candela.

== Political career ==
In 2009, Martín was part of the grassroots organization Plataforma de Afectados por la Hipoteca, where she contacted Ada Colau, forming part of her party Barcelona en Comú in the 2015 local elections. In the 2015 general elections, she was elected deputy for Barcelona in the En Comú Podem coalition. In the 2019 municipal elections, Martín ran on the Barcelona en Comú list in sixth place for the Barcelona City Council, and was elected as a councillor.

== Personal life ==
Martín identifies herself as part of the LGBT community.
