= Gonzalo Palacín =

Spanish politician (born 1984)

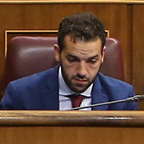
- Palacín in 2018

Member of the Senate
- In office 28 April 2019 – 16 August 2023
- Constituency: Huesca

Member of the Congress of Deputies
- In office 13 January 2016 – 21 May 2019
- Constituency: Huesca

Personal details
- Born: 9 February 1984 (age 42)
- Party: Spanish Socialist Workers' Party

Gonzalo Palacín Guarné (born 9 February 1984) is a Spanish politician. From 2019 to 2023, he was a member of the Senate. From 2016 to 2019, he was a member of the Congress of Deputies.
