= Luis Carlos Sahuquillo =

Spanish politician (born 1966)

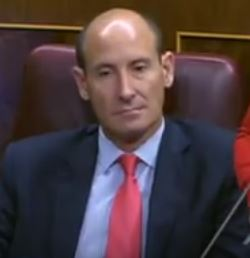
- Sahuquillo in 2017

Member of the Congress of Deputies
- Incumbent
- Assumed office 1 April 2008
- Constituency: Cuenca

Personal details
- Born: 11 January 1966 (age 60)
- Party: Spanish Socialist Workers' Party

Luis Carlos Sahuquillo García (born 11 January 1966) is a Spanish politician serving as a member of the Congress of Deputies since 2008. He has served as secretary general of the Spanish Socialist Workers' Party in Cuenca since 2017.
