= Txema Guijarro García =

Spanish economist and politician

Txema Guijarro García MP
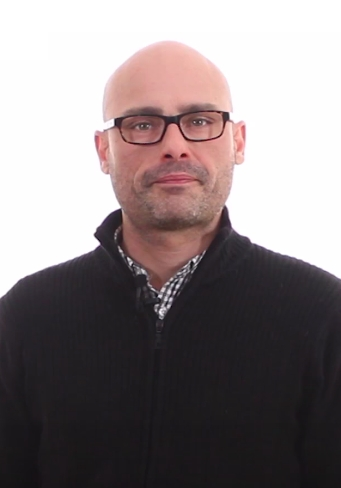

Member of the Congress of Deputies
- Incumbent
- Assumed office 7 January 2016
- Constituency: Alicante

Personal details
- Born: 15 April 1975 (age 51) Madrid, Spain
- Party: Podemos (2014–present)
- Education: Autonomous University of Madrid

Txema Guijarro García (born 15 April 1975) is a Spanish economist and politician of Podemos party. He currently serves as Member of the Congress of Deputies since 2016 and he chairs the Congress' Committee on Budget since 2019.

At the 2015 Spanish general election he was elected to the Congress of Deputies, representing Valencia province.

Prior to his election, Guijarro had worked for 8 years in Ecuador as an adviser to the government of Rafael Correa.
