= Marc Lamuà =

Spanish politician (born 1980)

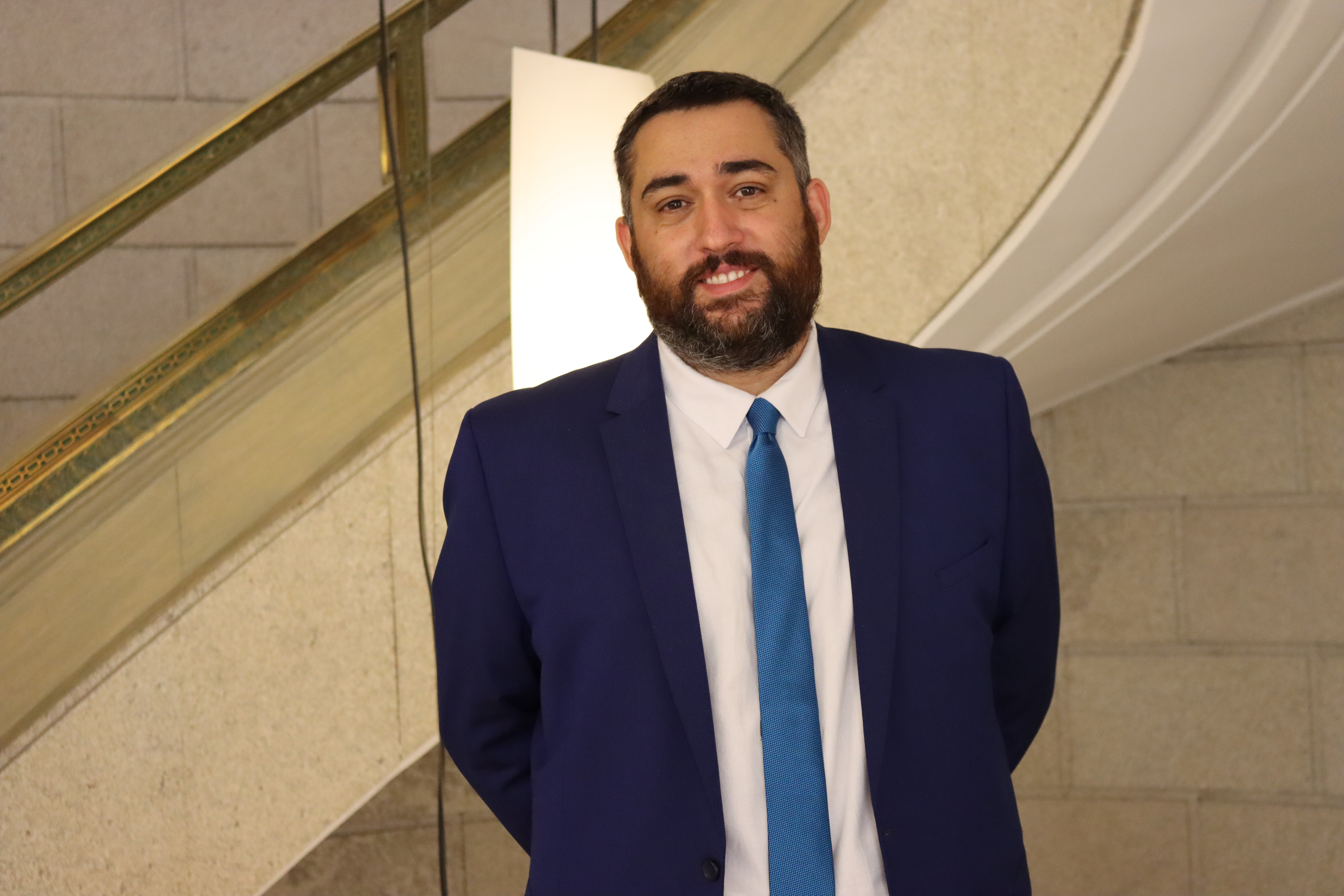
- Lamuà in 2021

Member of the Congress of Deputies
- Incumbent
- Assumed office 4 January 2016
- Constituency: Girona

Personal details
- Born: 19 May 1980 (age 45)
- Party: Socialists' Party of Catalonia

Marc Lamuà Estañol (born 19 May 1980) is a Spanish politician serving as a member of the Congress of Deputies since 2016. He has been a substitute member of the Parliamentary Assembly of the Council of Europe since 2020.
