= José Alberto Herrero =

Spanish politician (born 1978)

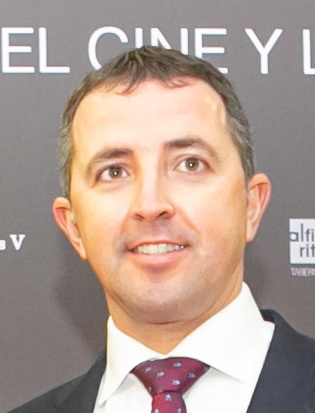
- Herrero in 2021

Member of the Congress of Deputies
- Incumbent
- Assumed office 9 September 2014
- Preceded by: Santiago Lanzuela
- Constituency: Teruel

Personal details
- Born: 2 July 1978 (age 47)
- Party: People's Party

José Alberto Herrero Bono (born 2 July 1978) is a Spanish politician serving as a member of the Congress of Deputies since 2014. He has served as mayor of Calanda since 2019.
