= Joseba Agirretxea =

Spanish politician (born 1966)

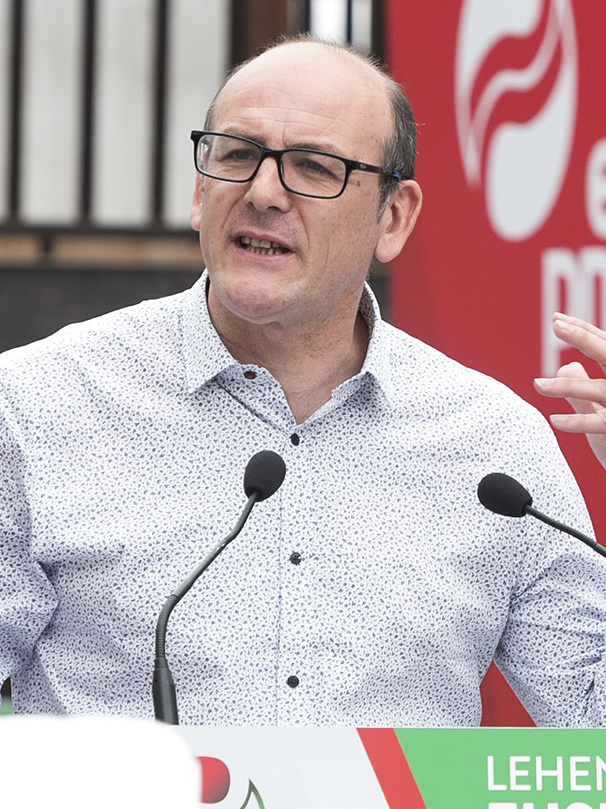
- Agirretxea in 2016

Member of the Congress of Deputies
- Incumbent
- Assumed office 1 April 2008
- Constituency: Gipuzkoa

Personal details
- Born: 6 August 1966 (age 59)
- Party: Basque Nationalist Party

Joseba Andoni Agirretxea Urresti (born 6 August 1966) is a Spanish politician serving as a member of the Congress of Deputies since 2008. He has served as chairman of the committee on agriculture, fisheries and food since 2019.
