= Xavier Eritja =

Spanish historian and politician

Xavier Eritja MP

Member of the Congress of Deputies
- Incumbent
- Assumed office 12 January 2016
- Constituency: Lleida

Personal details
- Born: Francesc Xavier Eritja i Ciuró; 26 March 1970 (age 56) Sallent, Catalonia, Spain
- Citizenship: Spanish
- Party: Republican Left of Catalonia
- Other political affiliations: Republican Left of Catalonia–Sovereigntists
- Education: University of Barcelona; University of Toulouse; University of Lleida

Francesc Xavier Eritja i Ciuró (born 26 March 1970) is a Spanish historian and politician from Catalonia who serves as a Member of the Congress of Deputies of Spain.

== Early life ==
Eritja was born on 26 March 1970 in Sallent, Catalonia. He holds a degree in history from the University of Barcelona, a degree in medieval history from the University of Toulouse, and a postgraduate qualification in cultural management from the University of Lleida.

== Career ==
Eritja worked for the Catalan health service's administrative planning unit.

Eritja is a member of the Catalan National Assembly, Òmnium Cultural, and Ateneu Popular de Ponent. He contested the 2015 general election as a Republican Left of Catalonia–Catalonia Yes (ERC–CatSí) electoral alliance candidate in the Province of Lleida and was elected to the Congress of Deputies. He was re-elected at the 2016 and 2019 general elections.

== Electoral history ==
Electoral history of Xavier Eritja
Election	Constituency	Party	Alliance	No.	Result
2015 general	Province of Lleida	Republican Left of Catalonia	Republican Left of Catalonia–Catalonia Yes	1	Elected
2016 general	Province of Lleida	Republican Left of Catalonia	Republican Left of Catalonia–Catalonia Yes	1	Elected
2019 general	Province of Lleida	Republican Left of Catalonia	Republican Left of Catalonia–Sovereigntists	1	Elected
