= Antonio González Terol =

Spanish politician (born 1978)

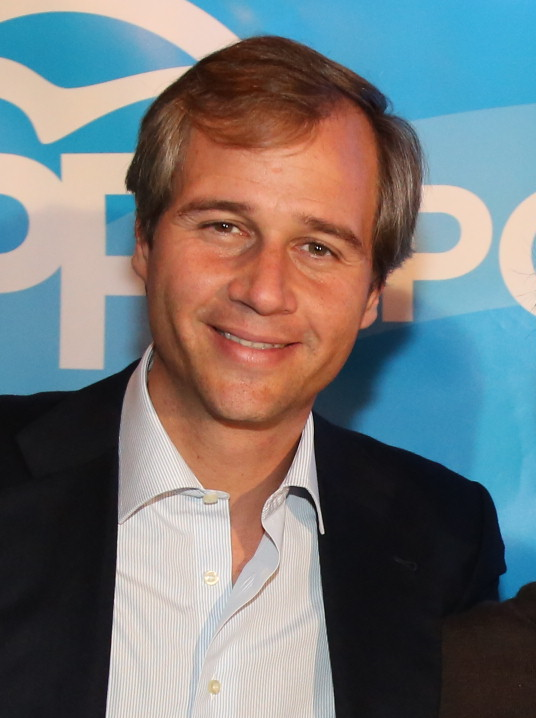
- González Terol in 2017

Member of the Congress of Deputies
- In office 13 January 2016 – 17 August 2023
- Constituency: Madrid

Personal details
- Born: 23 August 1978 (age 47)
- Party: People's Party

Antonio González Terol (born 23 August 1978) is a Spanish politician. From 2016 to 2023, he was a member of the Congress of Deputies. From 2007 to 2016, he was a member of the Assembly of Madrid. From 2011 to 2019, he served as mayor of Boadilla del Monte.
