= Artemi Rallo Lombarte =

Spanish politician

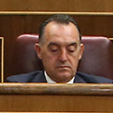
(Artemi Rallo) Sesión control 12.09.2018

Artemi Vicent Rallo Lombarte (born in Castellón de la Plana on 9 August 1965) is a Spanish lawyer, legal scholar, professor of law and politician.

He was elected to the Congress of Deputies in the 2015 general election, standing as a Socialist Party of the Valencian Country (PSPV-PSOE) candidate in Castellón province.

Rallo Lombarte has been a member of the Corts Valencianes. He holds a PhD in Law. Rallo Lombarte teaches Constitutional Law at Universidad Jaume I. He served as director of the Agencia Española de Protección de Datos between 2007 and 2011.
