= Manuel Bustos =

Argentine footballer (born 1992)

Personal information
- Date of birth: 9 September 1992 (age 34)
- Place of birth: Vila, Argentina
- Height: 1.83 m (6 ft 0 in)
- Position: Forward

Team information
- Current team: Ben Hur

Senior career*
Years	Team	Apps	(Gls)
2016–2017	Libertad	10	(4)
2017–2018	Atlético de Rafaela	10	(1)
2017	→ Libertad (loan)	9	(4)
2018–2019	Sportivo Belgrano	16	(2)
2019	Gimnasia y Esgrima	10	(1)
2020–	Ben Hur	3	(1)
- * Club domestic league appearances and goals as of 13:01, 6 October 2020 (UTC)

Manuel Bustos (born 9 September 1992) is an Argentine professional footballer who plays as a forward for Ben Hur.

== Career ==
Bustos' career started with Libertad of Torneo Federal A. He made his debut on 3 April 2016 in a Sunchales derby against Unión Sunchales. Bustos scored four goals in nine appearances during the 2016–17 season, he was then signed by Argentine Primera División club Atlético de Rafaela in early 2017. However, following squad changes by manager Juan Manuel Llop, Bustos was unneeded and subsequently loaned back to Libertad. He went onto make nine appearances back with Libertad, scoring four times. He returned to Rafaela for the 2017–18 Primera B Nacional under new manager Lucas Bovaglio.

He made his professional debut on 15 September 2017 versus Gimnasia y Esgrima (J), scoring his first Rafaela goal in the process in a 0–2 win. Bustos joined Torneo Federal A side Sportivo Belgrano in September 2018. Two goals in nineteen appearances followed in 2018–19. July 2019 saw Bustos join fellow third tier team Gimnasia y Esgrima. He made his first appearance for the Concepción del Uruguay club on 1 September against San Martín de Formosa, before scoring against Crucero del Norte on 19 October. On 16 January 2020, Bustos signed for Ben Hur of Torneo Regional Federal Amateur.

== Career statistics ==
As of 6 October 2020.

Club statistics
Club	Season	League			Cup		League Cup		Continental		Other		Total	
Club	Season	Division	Apps	Goals	Apps	Goals	Apps	Goals	Apps	Goals	Apps	Goals	Apps	Goals
Libertad	2016	Torneo Federal A	1	0	0	0	—		—		0	0	1	0
Libertad	2016–17	Torneo Federal A	9	4	0	0	—		—		0	0	9	4
Libertad	Total		10	4	0	0	—		—		0	0	10	4
Atlético de Rafaela	2016–17	Primera División	0	0	0	0	—		—		0	0	0	0
Atlético de Rafaela	2017–18	Primera B Nacional	10	1	1	0	—		—		0	0	11	1
Atlético de Rafaela	Total		10	1	1	0	—		—		0	0	11	1
Libertad (loan)	2016–17	Torneo Federal A	9	4	0	0	—		—		0	0	9	4
Sportivo Belgrano	2018–19	Torneo Federal A	16	2	3	0	—		—		0	0	19	2
Gimnasia y Esgrima	2019–20	Torneo Federal A	10	1	0	0	—		—		0	0	10	1
Ben Hur	2020	Torneo Amateur	3	1	0	0	—		—		0	0	3	1
Career total			58	13	4	0	—		—		0	0	62	13
