= Esther Peña =

Spanish politician (born 1980)

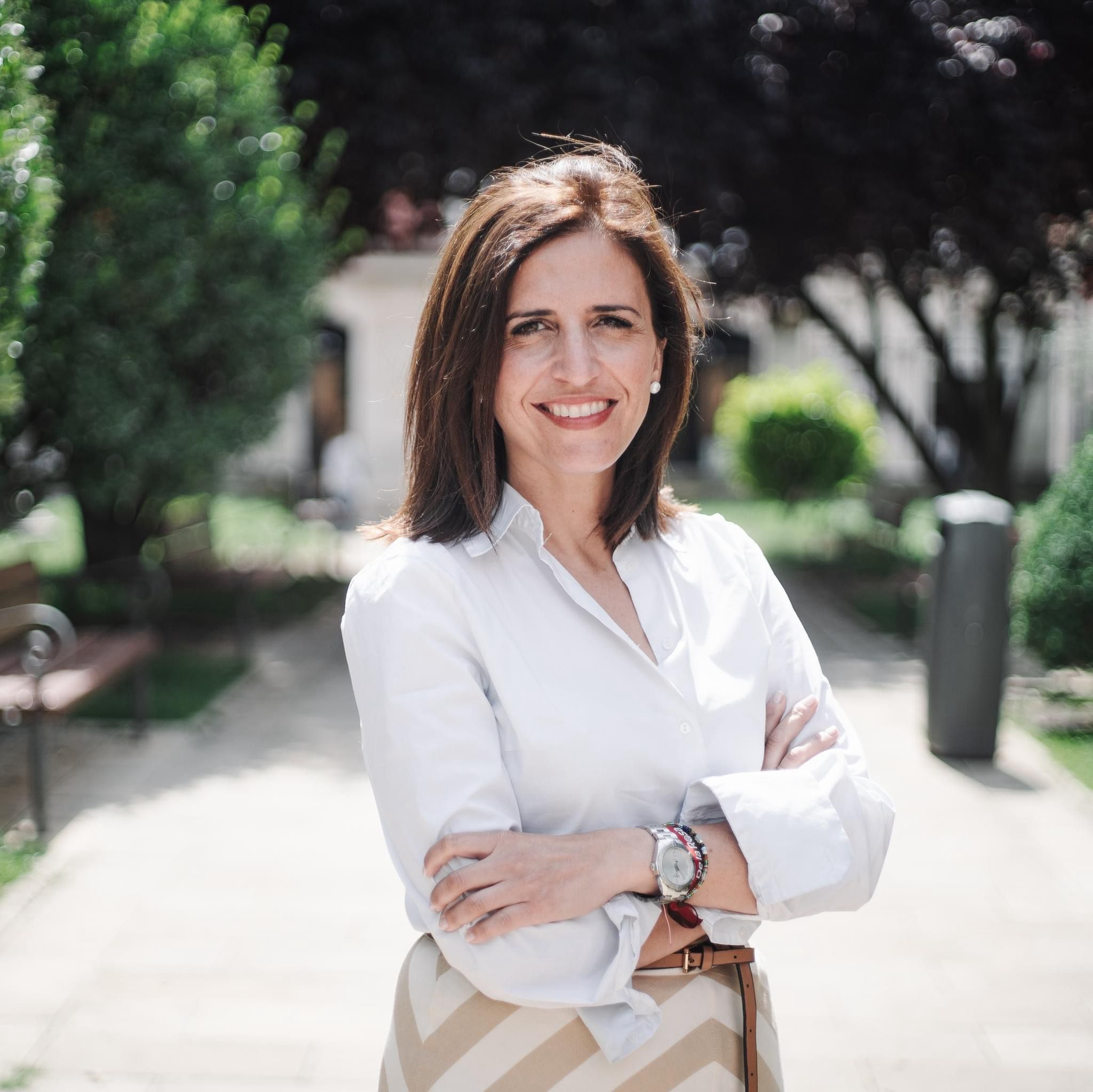
- Peña in 2023

Member of the Congress of Deputies
- Incumbent
- Assumed office 4 January 2016
- Constituency: Burgos

Personal details
- Born: 12 July 1980 (age 45)
- Party: Spanish Socialist Workers' Party

Esther Peña Camarero (born 12 July 1980) is a Spanish politician serving as a member of the Congress of Deputies since 2016. She has served as spokesperson of the Spanish Socialist Workers' Party since 2024.
