= Antonio Gutiérrez Limones =

Spanish politician

Senator Antonio Gutierrez Limones

Senator at Cortes Generales
- Incumbent
- Assumed office 21 May 2019

Senator of Cortes Generales
- In office 11 January 2016 – 5 March 2019

Personal details
- Born: 6 January 1963 (age 63) Seville, Spain
- Party: Spanish Socialist Workers' Party
- Education: University of Seville

Antonio Gutiérrez Limones (born 6 January 1963 in Seville, Spain) is a Spanish politician and senator. He is the Chairman of the Foreign Relations Committee of the Spanish Senate. He was elected senator on 21 May 2019 after the general elections.

== Early life and education ==
Gutiérrez Limones was born on 6 January 1963 in Seville, Andalusia, Spain. He attended the University of Seville where he studied Law and graduated with a BSc and subsequently obtained a master's degree in local development. Limones also has a Master's degree in business management from the same university.

== Political career ==
=== Career in local politics ===
Gutiérrez Limones began his political career running as Mayor of Alcalá de Guadaíra. On 28 May 1995, during the general municipality elections he won the election as Mayor of Alcala de Guadaira. He was elected Mayor of the 3rd city of Province of Seville. In June 1999, he was reelected as Mayor.

=== Senate mandate ===
During the 2008 general elections Gutiérrez Limones contested as senator under the Spanish Socialist Workers' Party for the Seville (Congress of Deputies constituency) and won with approximately 574,240 votes. He is a member of the Permanent Deputation of Spain. In November 2011, he was re-elected into the Senate of Spain. In the senate he was appointed Vice-chairman of Foreign Affairs and Local Entities committees in the Senate of Spain. He is a member of the Spanish delegation to the Parliamentary Assembly of the Council of Europe.

=== Congress of Deputies ===
In the 2015 elections, Gutiérrez Limones was elected into the Congress of Deputies of Spain. He was re-elected on the event of the early legislative elections of June 2016 which he then tendered his resignation from his mandate as mayor in accordance with the statutes of the party from 5 May. He retains all of his parliamentary powers.

In addition to his committee assignments, Gutiérrez Limones has been a member of the Spanish delegation to the Parliamentary Assembly of the Council of Europe since 2012. In this capacity, he has served on the Committee on Migration, Refugees and Displaced Persons (since 2023); the Committee on Political Affairs and Democracy (since 2019); the Committee on the Honouring of Obligations and Commitments by Member States of the Council of Europe (Monitoring Committee) (since 2019); the Committee on Legal Affairs and Human Rights (2016–2019); the Committee on Social Affairs, Health and Sustainable Development (2014–2016); the Committee on Equality and Non-Discrimination (2012–2014); and the Committee on Culture, Science, Education and Media (2012–2016). Since 2016, he has been one of the Assembly’s vice-presidents. He also authored a 2025 report on the Council of Europe's relations with Latin America.

== Alleged funds embezzlement ==
In June 2017, an investigating Judge in Seville asked the Supreme Court in Spain to indict Gutiérrez Limones over an alleged embezzlement of public funds meant for Alcalá Comunicación Municipal. The case was file and opened in the supreme court in November 2017 but in April 2018 the case was dismissed from the Supreme Court of Spain due to the statute of limitations of the facts alleged against him.
