= Ana María Surra =

Spanish politician

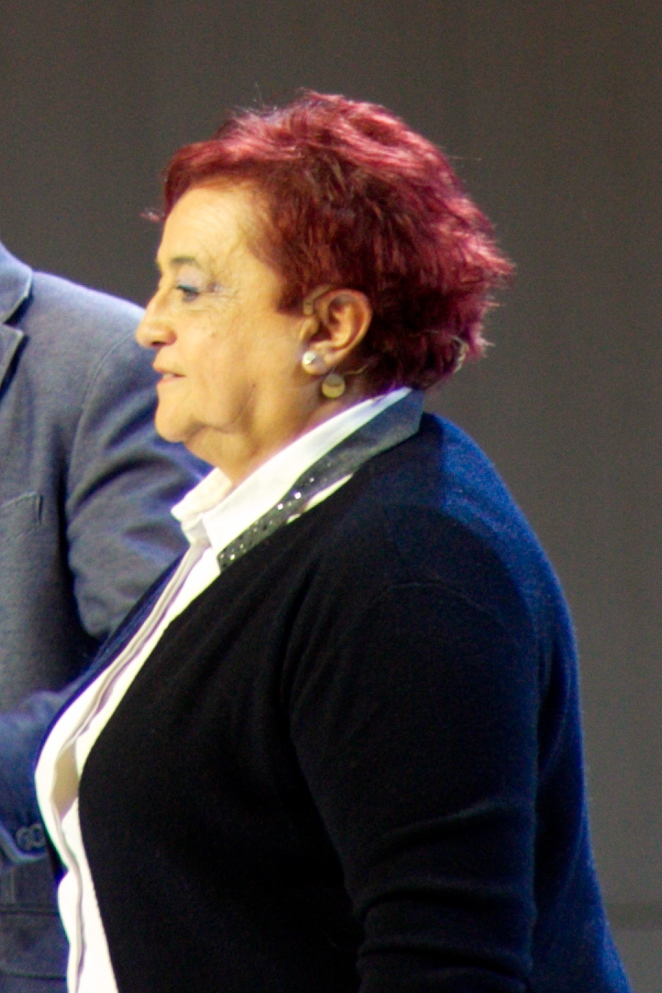
Ana Surra

Ana María Surra Spadea (Montevideo, 10 July 1952) is a Uruguayan-born social worker and politician.

She was elected to the Congress of Deputies in the list of Esquerra Republicana de Catalunya.
