= Carlos Rojas García =

Spanish politician (born 1970)

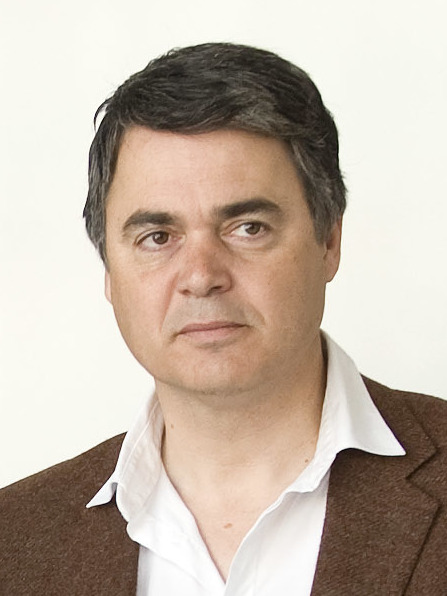
- Rojas in 2013

Member of the Congress of Deputies
- Incumbent
- Assumed office 13 January 2016
- Constituency: Granada

Personal details
- Born: 23 September 1970 (age 55)
- Party: People's Party (since 1991)

Carlos Rojas García (born 23 September 1970) is a Spanish politician serving as a member of the Congress of Deputies since 2016. He served as mayor of Motril from 2003 to 2004 and from 2007 to 2012.
