= Belén Hoyo Juliá =

Spanish politician (born 1984)

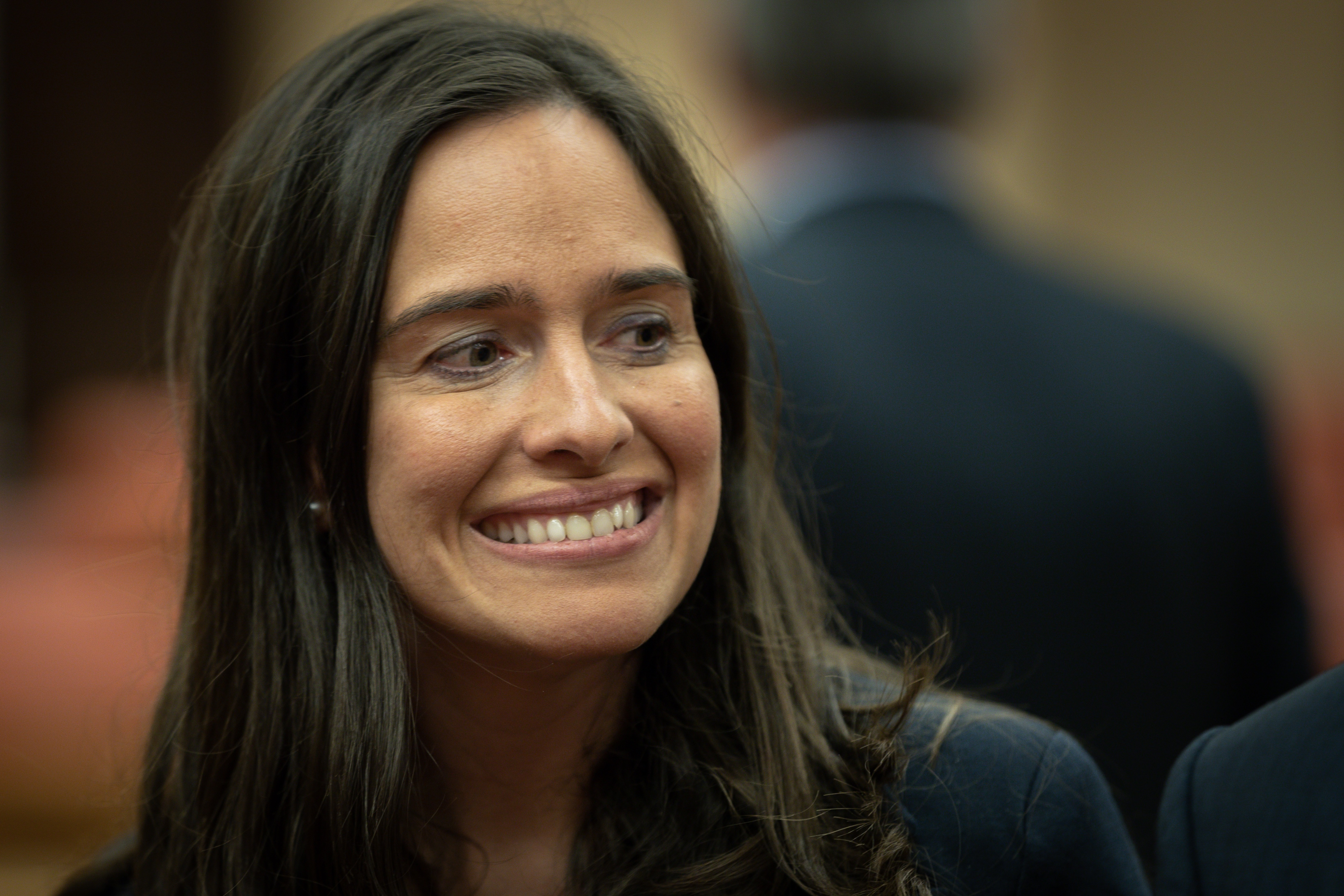

Belén Hoyo Juliá (Valencia, Spain, 5 May 1984) is a Spanish politician who belongs to the People's Party (PP).

Hoyo is married with 2 children, one of whom was born following a Caesarean section.

She holds degrees in Law and Political sciences from the University of Valencia. She served as vice-secretary of Nuevas Generaciones, the PP's youth wing and as General Coordinator of the party in Valencia Province. She also served as Director of youth for the Generalitat Valenciana.

At the 2011 general election, she was elected to the Spanish Congress of Deputies representing Valencia Province. She was the youngest of the 350 deputies elected. For the 2015 general election, she was placed second on the PP list and was re-elected as one of the five PP deputies in Valencia Province.
