= Lídia Guinart =

Spanish politician (born 1966)

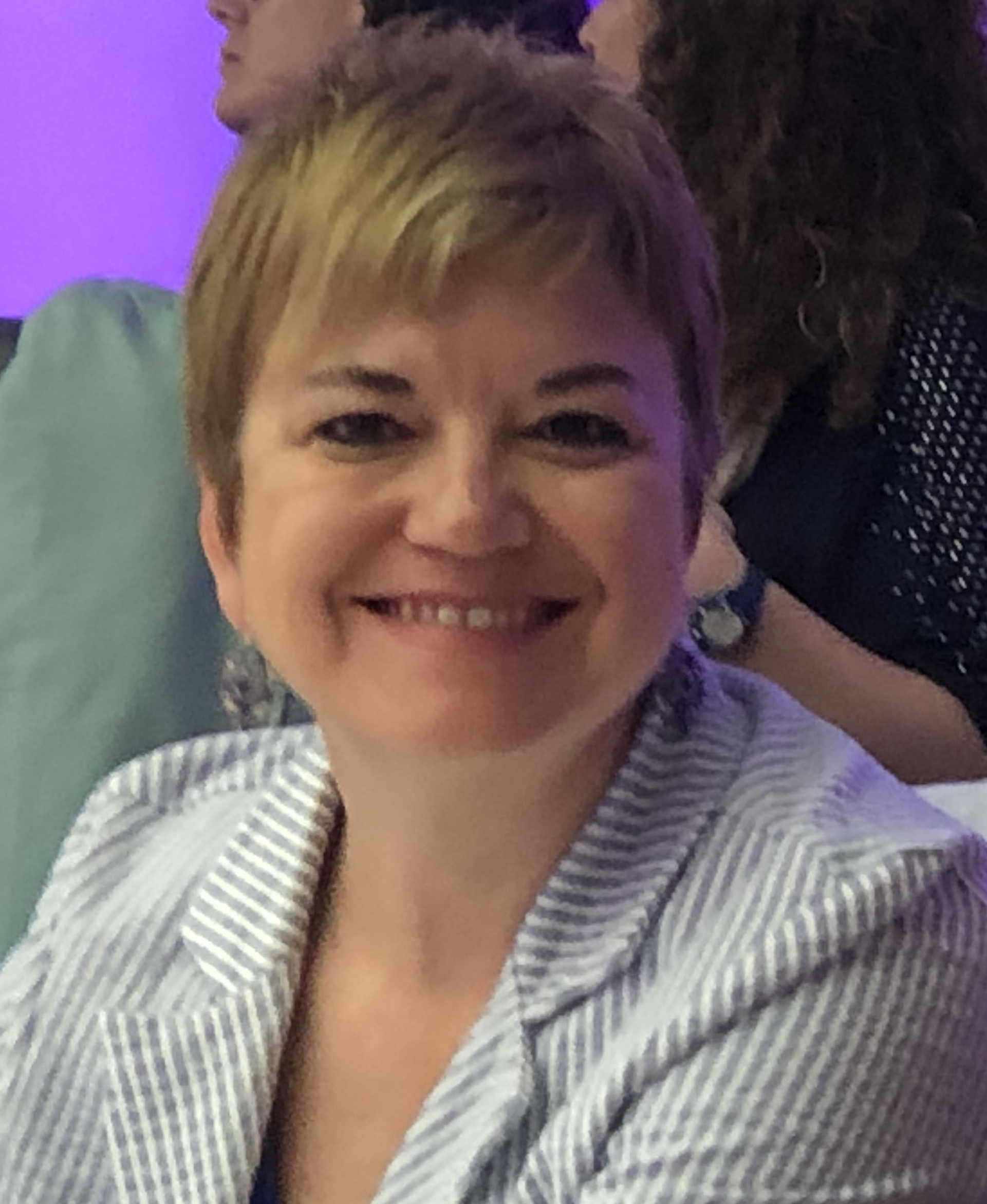
- Guinart in 2019

Member of the Congress of Deputies
- Incumbent
- Assumed office 13 January 2016
- Constituency: Barcelona

Personal details
- Born: 30 December 1966 (age 59)
- Party: Socialists' Party of Catalonia

Lídia Guinart Moreno (born 30 December 1966) is a Spanish politician serving as a member of the Congress of Deputies since 2016. She has served as chairwoman of the committee on the state pact against gender-related violence since 2024.
