= Vicente Ten =

Spanish politician (born 1966)

Vicente Ten Oliver (born 19 April 1966) is a Spanish politician. He was elected in the 2015 general election to the Congress of Deputies for the electoral district of Valencia for the Citizens party.

In July 2015 Ten was elected as the number one the list for the Citizens party for the electoral district of Valencia. He received 455 votes while his opponent, Vicente Raga, received 366.
