= Patricia Blanquer =

Spanish politician (born 1973)

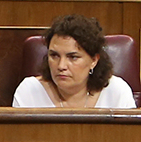
- Blanquer in 2018

Member of the Congress of Deputies
- Incumbent
- Assumed office 24 July 2012
- Preceded by: Leire Pajín
- Constituency: Alicante

Personal details
- Born: 12 May 1973 (age 52)
- Party: Spanish Socialist Workers' Party

Patricia Blanquer Alcaraz (born 12 May 1973) is a Spanish politician serving as a member of the Congress of Deputies since 2012. She has served as chairwoman of the committee on the Toledo Pact since 2023.
