= Ana Alós =

Spanish politician (born 1969)

Ana Isabel Alós López
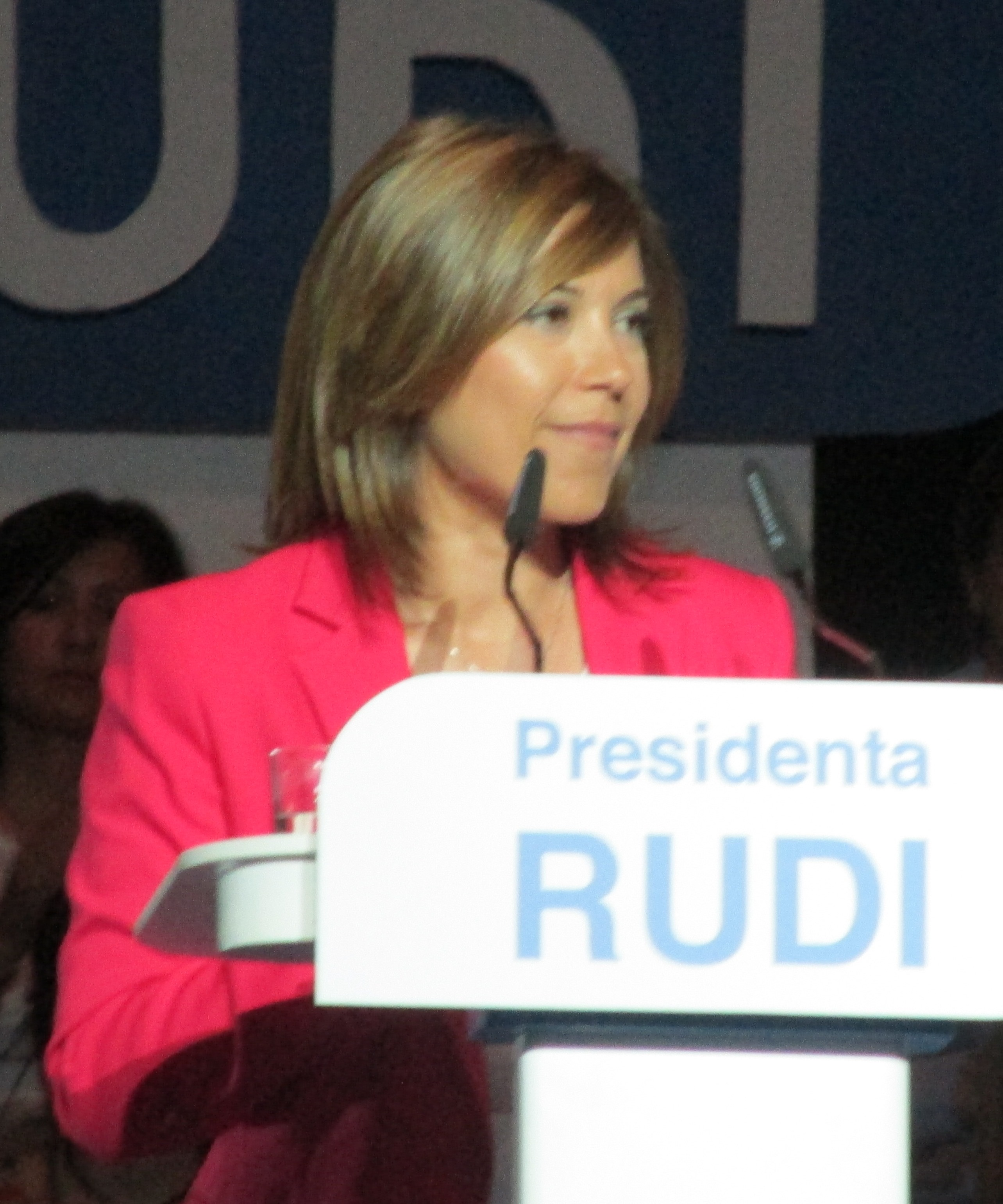

Senator of Cortes Generales
- Incumbent
- Assumed office 21 May 2019

Member of the Cortes Generales
- In office 8 January 2016 – 5 March 2019

Mayor of Huesca
- In office 11 June 2011 – 13 June 2015

Personal details
- Born: 11 May 1969 (age 57) Huesca, Spain
- Citizenship: Spain
- Party: People's Party (Spain)

Ana Isabel Alós López (born 11 May 1969 in Huesca, Spain) is a Spanish politician from the People's Party.

She sat on the Spanish senate committee for monitoring and evaluating the agreements of senate reports on strategies against gender-based violence. She is also a member of the Permanent Deputation of Spain. She was elected member of the Cortes Generales on 8 January 2016.

Ana Alos Lopez attended the University of Zaragoza where she studied economic and later graduated with a BSc in Economics. She also has a master's degree in Business Admin and Management from Comillas Pontifical University.

In 2003, during the municipal elections of March 2003 she was elected councilor of Huesca. In 2011, after running two terms as city councilor was elected Mayor of Huesca. She is also the first woman to be elected mayor in the city of Huesca. After her term as Mayor, in 2015 she was elected into the Congress of Deputies with 39,747 votes approximately. During the general elections of 2015, she was reelected in to the Palacio de las Cortes, Madrid as member of congress.

She is a member of the Finance and Civil Service Commission and the Education and Sport Commission. In the general elections of 28 April 2019 she was elected senator for the province of Huesca.

She was elected to the Congress of Deputies from Huesca in the 2023 Spanish general election.
