= Rubén Moreno Palanques =

Spanish politician (born 1958)

Ruben Moreno Palanques (Castellón, Spain, 23 July 1958) is a Spanish politician of the conservative People's Party (PP), who earned his MD PhD at the University of Valencia. He is Senator and he was MP in the Congress of Deputies in the X, XI and XII Legislatures; Secretary of State for Relations with Parliament in the government of Mariano Rajoy; Secretary General of Health in the governments of Presidents Aznar and Rajoy.

== Early life and education ==
Doctor in medicine and surgery from the University of Valencia, he was the first member of his family to devote himself to medicine, but not to politics. His maternal grandfather stood in the municipal elections that had been called by the II Republic, for Republican Action party. He studied music during his childhood at the Professional Conservatory of Music in Valencia, but he had to interrupt his studies when he won a scholarship through a national competition that would keep him away from the family home until he finished his medical studies.

== Political career ==
Between 1995 and 2000 he served as General Director of the Valencian Health Service; Undersecretary of the Valencian Ministry of Health; and Undersecretary for the Valencian Agency of Health in the Department of Health of the Valencian Government.

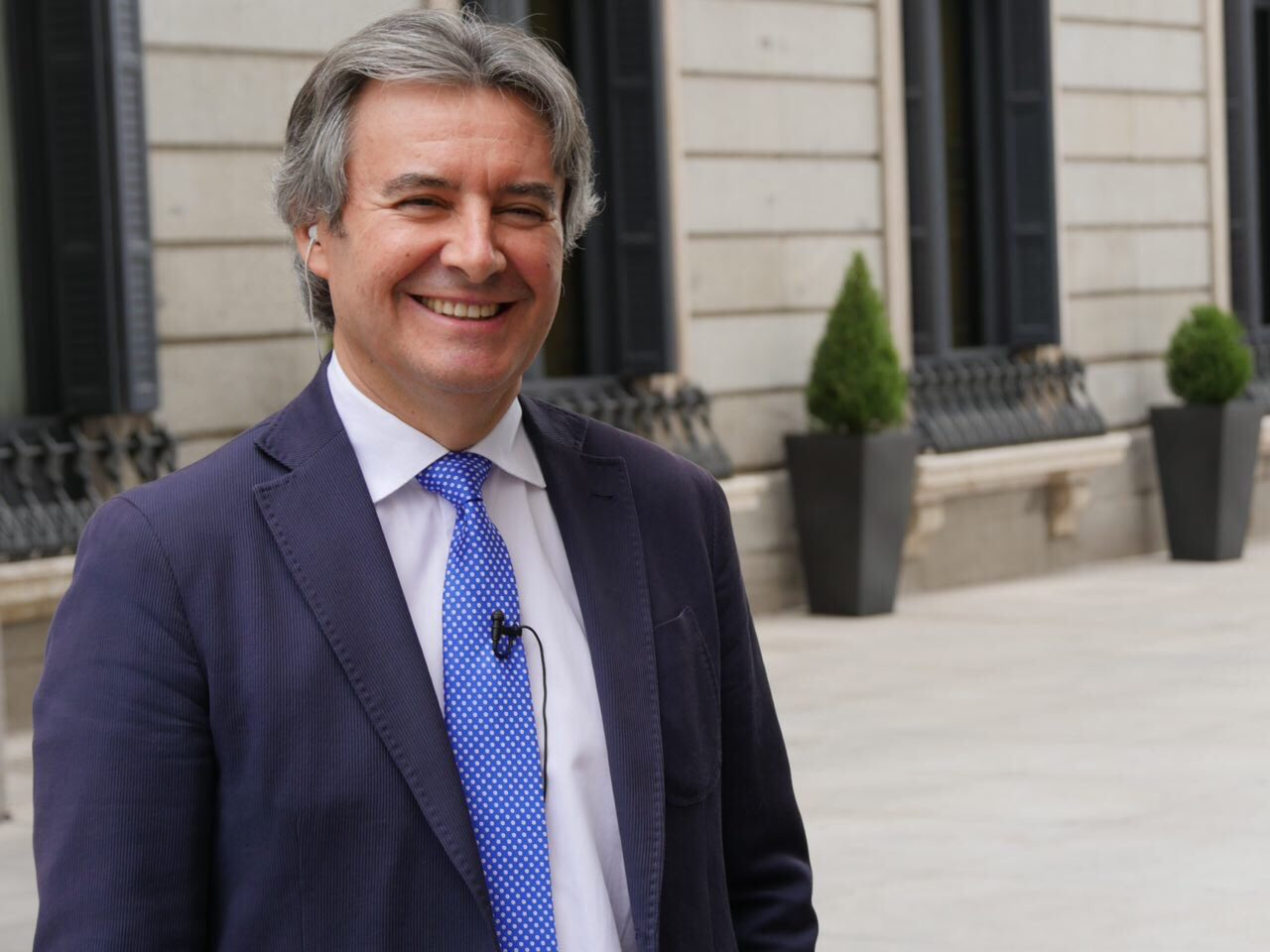
Ruben Moreno interviewed in the Congress of Deputies

With the beginning of President Aznar's second term in 2000, he was appointed Secretary General of Health Management and Cooperation of the Ministry of Health and Consumer Affairs, and President of the National Health Service (INSALUD). During this period, he was responsible for carrying out the largest transfer of competences in Spain, the health competences from the INSALUD to the Autonomous Communities of Madrid, Asturias, Castile-León, Baleares, Aragon, Murcia, Castile-La Mancha, Cantabria, Extremadura and Rioja. This involved the transfer of resources valued at more than 9 billion euros; 133,889 statutory health workers; 79 hospitals and 1,069 health centers.

In 2011 he was elected Member of Congress of Deputies for Valencia for the conservative party PP. There he served as Health spokesperson and spokesperson in the Joint Committee for the European Union by the Popular Parliamentary Group (GP); and Vice President of the Toledo Pact Committee. Since then he had an intense activity at European level. During that stage he was the representative of the GP in the Subcommittee for the Analysis of Structural Problems of the Health System (National Pact for Health). In December 2014, he resigned from the seat in Congress to be appointed Secretary General of Health and Consumer Affairs of the Ministry of Health, Social Services and Equality.

=== Hepatitis C crisis ===
Upon arrival at the Ministry of Health with the new Minister Alfonso Alonso in December 2014, they had to face the general health crisis triggered in the previous months by the hepatitis C patients’ demands of treatment for all with last generation of antiviral drugs (sofosbuvir, ledipasvir, daclatasvir, etc.).

While some countries established a moratorium delaying treatments up to a year, they designed an action plan in less than a month to solve this situation whose axes were a) the constitution of a Committee of National and International Experts in charge of developing a National Strategic Plan for Hepatitis C Approach, which would be approved by the Plenary of the Interterritorial Council of the National Health System (CISNS) of January 14, 2015; and b) the reduction of the new generation antiviral drugs cost by 76.15%. This action had the best possible result both in terms of health for patients, and in terms of accessibility for the state and regional administration. All this has allowed to treat and cure more than 130,000 patients, in a history of collective success, which can culminate with the elimination of hepatitis C in Spain in 2024, six years before the goal set by the World Health Organization (WHO), which would make the country the second in the world, after Iceland, to do so.

=== Diphtheria case in unvaccinated child ===
In June 2015, there was a case of diphtheria in Catalonia, a disease that has almost disappeared and is difficult to suspect. It was an unvaccinated child who contracted the disease in Olot (Girona). Admitted to the Vall d´Hebron Hospital in Barcelona, every effort was made to have the so special therapeutic resources that this disease required in the current circumstances, in which there was no case of diphtheria since 1988. After a comprehensive and complex search for diphtheria antitoxin conducted directly by the Secretary General of Health and Consumer Affairs in the different countries of the world that could have it, he was able to locate it in less than 48 hours in Russia, whose authorities made it available to Spain by immediately and disinterestedly sending it from Moscow.

=== Chickenpox vaccine ===
The varicella vaccine was kept on the Spanish vaccination calendar at 12 years of age, being indicated in adolescents who were susceptible (who had not passed the disease) and in the risk groups until 2015. However, there were reports, including those of the Spanish Association of Pediatrics and the Spanish Association of Vaccination, which proposed the administration of this vaccine in the first pediatric age. This resulted in parents being recommended to vaccinate their children at an early pediatric age out of calendar at their cost.

The Minister Alfonso Alonso and the Secretary General of Health and Consumer Affairs Ruben Moreno promoted the approval by the Interterritorial Council of the SNS, in the plenary of July 29, 2015, of the vaccination calendar modification, to administer the vaccine to all children of an early pediatric age (first dose at 12–15 months and second between 3 and 4 years) beginning in 2016. By including it in the calendar, free access to the vaccine for all families was guaranteed.

=== Meningitis B vaccine ===
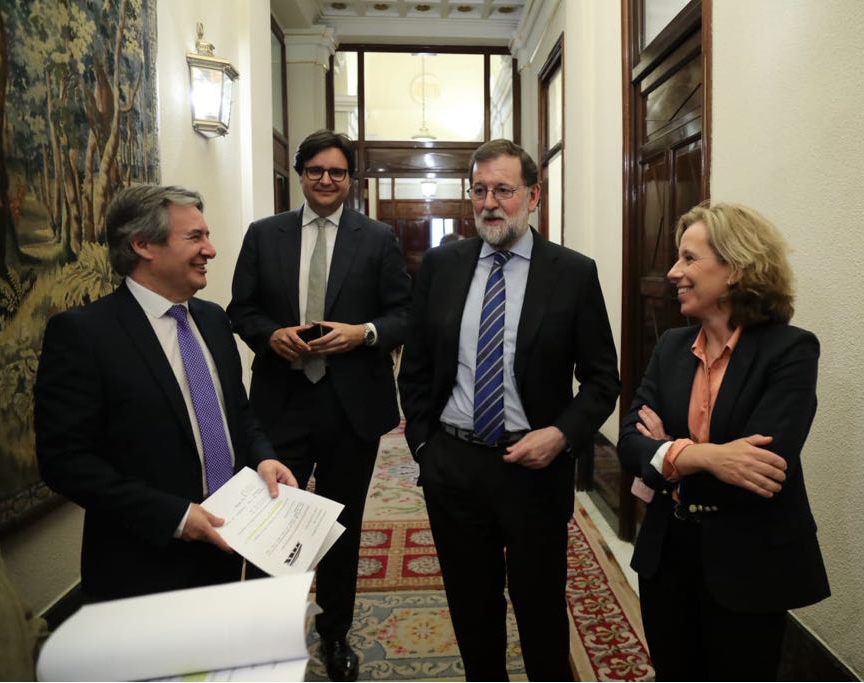
Ruben Moreno with President Rajoy

This vaccine was authorized in the European Union in January 2013, but in Spain it was qualified as for hospital use only by the Spanish Agency for Medicines and Health Products (AEMPS). In other words, it could not be purchased in pharmacies. When pediatricians were recommending vaccination in situations other than those that gave rise to hospital use, families had to travel to neighboring countries where the vaccine could be purchased in pharmacies. This situation resulted in numerous requests from families and the Autonomous Communities (CCAA) who did advocate that government made the vaccines available in Spanish pharmacies. Thus, an evaluation by the AEMPS of new quality and safety data submitted by the vaccine manufacturing company was first promoted after the distribution of more than 1,200,000 doses of the vaccine worldwide. In September 2015, the change of the dispensing conditions was authorized, and made the vaccine available at the Spanish pharmacy offices also.

Ruben Moreno was elected deputy in the general elections of 2015 and 2016 again, where he served as deputy spokesman and Committees Coordinator; Foreign Affairs, European Union and International Development Cooperation Coordinator of the GP; Vice President of the Joint Committee for the European Union; and Vice President of the Committee on Science, Innovation and Universities of Congress.

On February 2, 2018 he was appointed Secretary of State for Relations with Parliament of the Ministry of the Presidency.

For his work throughout his political career he received the Grand Cross of the Royal Order of Isabella the Catholic (gcYC), and the Grand Cross of the Order of Civil Merit (gcCM).

== Awards and honours ==
- Knight Grand Cross of the Royal Order of Isabella the Catholic (gcYC) Spain 2002
- Knight Grand Cross of the Order of Civil Merit (gcCM) Spain 2018
- Corresponding Academic of the Royal Academy of Medicine and Related Sciences of the Valencian Community.

== Publications ==
=== Newspaper articles ===
- El sueño del presidente. ABC September 13, 2019 [Spanish]
- A la luna de la sanidad. Gaceta Médica, September 2, 2019 [Spanish]
- La vida tenía un precio. ABC, August 12, 2019 [Spanish]
- La salud de sus señorías. El Mundo, August 8, 2019 [Spanish]
- ¿Un mundo sin Ciencia?. La Razón, July 22, 2019 [Spanish]
- Desventuras de un candidato. El Mundo, July 19, 2019
  [Spanish]

=== Scientific Publications ===
- Initial assessment of human gene diversity and expression patterns based upon 83 million nucleotides of cDNA sequence. Adams, M.D., Kerlavage, A.R., Fleischmann, R.D., Fuldner, R.A., Bult, C.J., Lee, N.H., Kirkness, E.F., Weinstock, K.G., Gocayne, J.D., White, O., Sutton, G., Blake, J.A., Brandon, R.C., Chiu, M.W., Clayton, R.A., Cline, R.T., Cotton, M.D., Earle-Hughes, J., Fine, L.D., FitzGerald, L.M., FitzHugh, W.M., Fritchman, J.L., Geoghagen, N.S.M., Glodek, A., Gnehm, C.L., Hanna, M.C., Hedblom, E., Hinkle, P.S. Jr, Kelley, J.M., Klimek, K.M., Kelley, J.C., Liu, L.-I., Marmaros, S.M., Merrick, J.M., Moreno-Palanques, R.F., McDonald, L.A., Nguyen, D.T, Pellegrino, S.M., Phillips, C.A., Ryder, S.E., Scott, J.L., Saudek, D.M., Shirley, R., Small, K.V., Spriggs, T.A., Utterback, T.R., Weidman, J.F., Li, Y., Barthlow, R., Bednarik, D.P., Cao, L., Cepeda, M.A., Coleman, T.A., Collins, E.-J., Dimke, D., Feng, P., Ferrie, A., Fischer, C., Hastings, G.A., He, W.-W., Hu, J.-S., Huddleston, K.A., Greene, J.M., Gruber, J., Hudson, P., Kim, A., Kozak, D.L., Kunsch, C., Ji, H., Li, H., Meissner, P.S., Olsen, H., Raymond, L., Wei, Y.-F., Wing, J., Xu, C., Yu, G.-L., Ruben, S.M., Dillon, P.J., Fannon, M.R., Rosen, C.A., Haseltine, W.A., Fields, C., Fraser, C.M. and Venter, J.C. Nature, 377 (Suppl.): 3-174 (1995).
- Complementary DNA sequencing: "expressed sequence tags" and the human genome project. Adams, M.D., Kelley, J.M., Gocayne, J.D., Dubnick, M., Polymeropoulos, M.H., Xiao, H., Merril, C.R., Wu, A., Olde, B., Moreno, R., Kerlavage, A.R., McCombie, W.R., and Venter, J.C. Science, 252: 1651-1656 (1991)
- Sequence identification of 2375 human brain genes. Adams, M., Dubnick, M., Kerlavage, A., Moreno, R., Kelley, J., Utterback, T., Nagle, J., Fields, C., and Venter, J.C. Nature, 355: 632-634 (1992)
- Chromosomal assignment of 46 brain cDNAs. Polymeropoulos MH, Xiao H, Glodek A, Gorski M, Adams MD, Moreno RF, Fitzgerald MG, Venter JC, Merril CR. Genomics. 12: 492-496 (1992)
- Construction of cDNA libraries. Moreno-Palanques, R.F. and Fuldner, R.A. In: Automated DNA Sequencing and Analysis (C. Fields, M. Adams, and J. C. Venter, ed.), London: Academic Press, 102-109, 1994.
- Gene therapy: Protocols and patient register. Moreno-Palanques, R. F. In: Gene Therapy. Bilbao: Fundación BBV, 133-187, 1995.
- El Sistema Nacional de Salud en la nueva etapa de descentralización plena. Moreno Palanques, RF. Presupuesto y Gasto Público, 28: 117-121, 2002. (Madrid: Instituto de Estudios Fiscales, Ministerio de Economía y Hacienda)
- La financiación de la asistencia sanitaria prestada a través del INSALUD. Moreno Palanques, RF. Presupuesto y Gasto Público, 25: 139-147, 2001 (Madrid: Instituto de Estudios Fiscales, Ministerio de Economía y Hacienda)
- El papel del Ministerio de Sanidad y Consumo ante la descentralización plena de la Gestón Sanitaria. Moreno Palanques, R.F. Revista de Administración Sanitaria, IV (16): 15-27 (2000)
