= Sandra Moneo =

Spanish politician (born 1969)

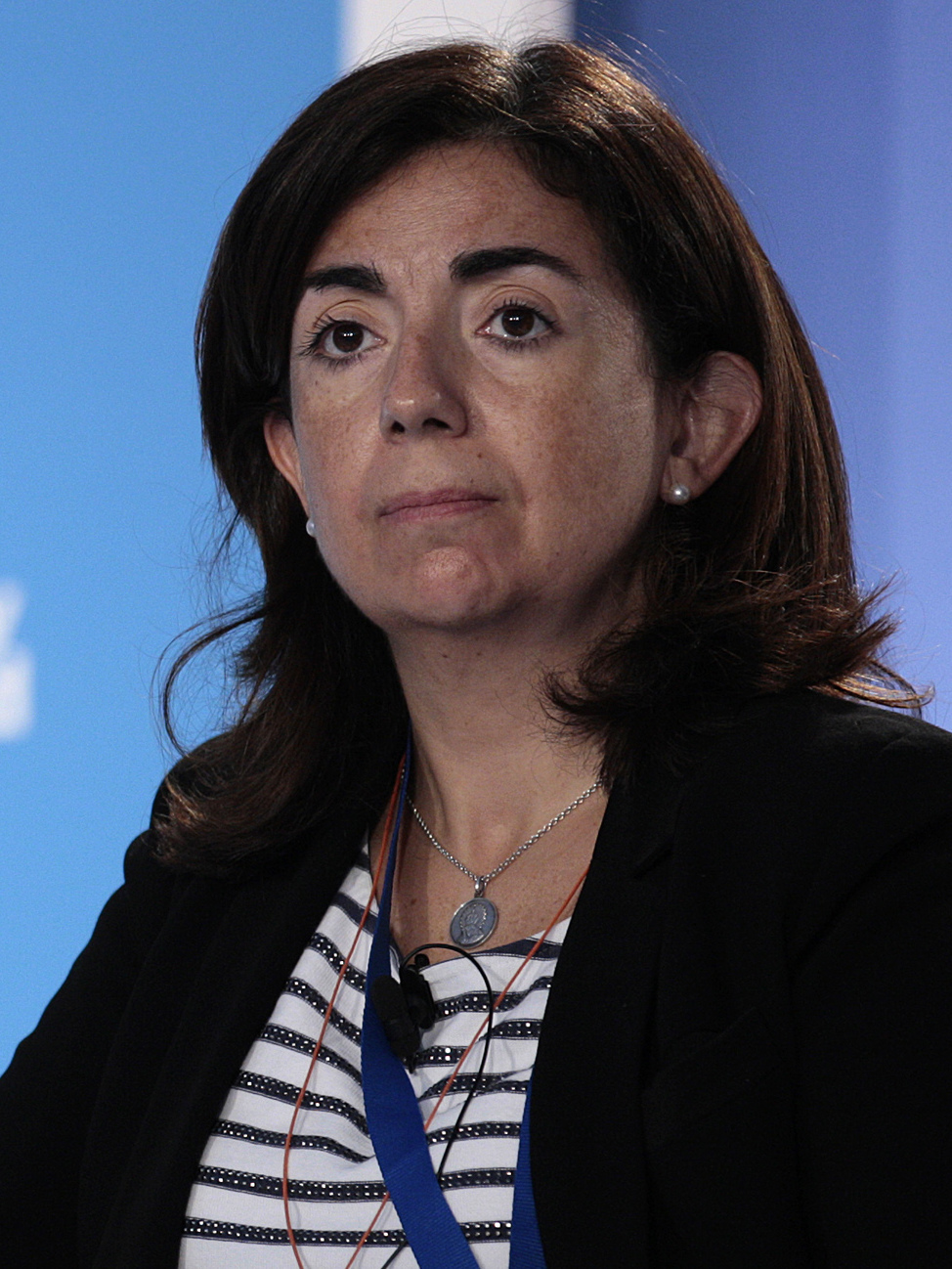
- Moneo in 2012

Member of the Congress of Deputies
- Incumbent
- Assumed office 21 May 1996
- Constituency: Burgos

Personal details
- Born: 14 July 1969 (age 56)
- Party: People's Party

María Sandra Moneo Díez (born 14 July 1969) is a Spanish politician serving as a member of the Congress of Deputies since 1996. From 1995 to 1996, she served as deputy mayor of Miranda de Ebro.
