= 12th Congress of Deputies =

Chamber of Deputies

←	11th	13th	→
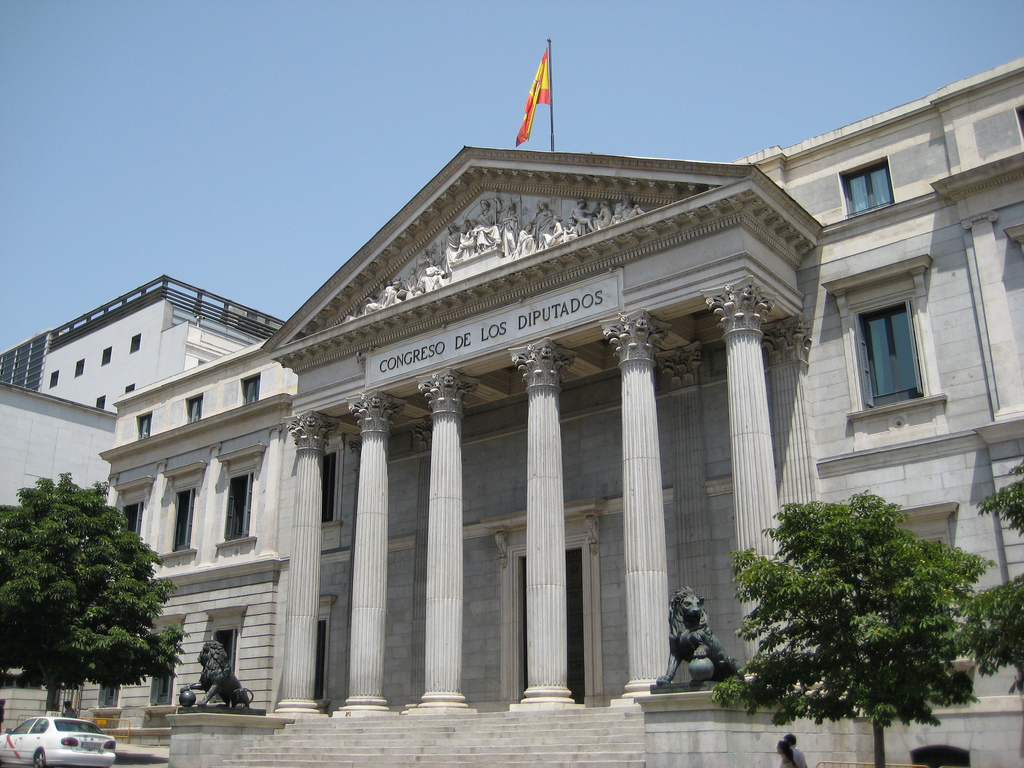

Overview
- Legislative body: Congress of Deputies
- Meeting place: Palacio de las Cortes
- Term: 19 July 2016 – 5 March 2019
- Election: 26 June 2016
- Government: Rajoy (2016-18); Sánchez (2018-19)
- Website: congreso.es

Deputies
- Members: 350
- President: Ana Pastor (PP)
- First Vice-President: Ignacio Prendes (Cs)
- Second Vice-President: Micaela Navarro (PSOE)
- Third Vice-President: Rosa Romero (PP)
- Fourth Vice-President: Gloria Elizo (UP)
- First Secretary: Alicia Sánchez-Camacho (PP)
- Second Secretary: Juan Luis Gordo (PSOE)
- Third Secretary: Marcelo Expósito (ECP)
- Fourth Secretary: Patricia Reyes (Cs)

The 12th Congress of Deputies was a meeting of the Congress of Deputies, the lower house of the Spanish Cortes Generales, with the membership determined by the results of the 2016 general election held on 26 June 2016. The congress met for the first time on 19 July 2016 and was dissolved prematurely on 5 March 2019.

== Election ==
The 12th Spanish general election was held on 26 June 2016. At the election the conservative People's Party remained the largest party in the Congress of Deputies but fell short of a majority.

Alliance	Votes	%	Seats	+/–
People's Party	7,941,236	33.01%	137	▲14
Spanish Socialist Workers' Party	5,443,846	22.63%	85	▼5
Unidos Podemos-En Comú Podem-A la valenciana-En Marea	5,087,538	21.15%	71	–
Citizens	3,141,570	13.06%	32	▼8
Republican Left of Catalonia–Catalonia Yes-Sovereignty for the Isles	639,652	2.66%	9	–
Democratic Convergence of Catalonia	483,488	2.01%	8	–
Basque Nationalist Party	287,014	1.19%	5	▼1
Others/blanks	1,029,411	4.28%	3	–
Total	24,053,755	100.00%	350	–

== History ==
The new congress met for the first time on 19 July 2016 and after two rounds of voting Ana Pastor (PP) was elected as President of the Congress of Deputies with the support of the Cs.

Other members of the Bureau of the Congress of Deputies were also elected on 19 July 2016: Ignacio Prendes (Cs), First Vice-President; Micaela Navarro (PSOE), Second Vice-President; Rosa Romero (PP), Third Vice-President; Gloria Elizo (Podemos), Fourth Vice-President; Alicia Sánchez-Camacho (PP), First Secretary; Juan Luis Gordo (PSOE), Second Secretary; Marcelo Expósito (ECP), Third Secretary; and Patricia Reyes (Cs), Fourth Secretary.

President
Candidate		Votes	
Candidate		Round 1	Round 2
Ana Pastor	PP	169	169
Patxi López	PSOE	85	155
Xavier Domènech	ECP	71	-
Francesc Homs	CDC	8	-
Blank		17	25
Total		350	349

Vice-President
Candidate		Votes
Ignacio Prendes	Cs	96
Micaela Navarro	PSOE	85
Rosa Romero	PP	83
Gloria Elizo	UP	71
Blank		14
Null		1
Total		350

Secretary
Candidate		Votes
Alicia Sánchez-Camacho	PP	111
Juan Luis Gordo	PSOE	85
Marcelo Expósito	ECP	70
Patricia Reyes	Cs	57
Blank		26
Null		1
Total		350

=== Aftermath Government formation ===
After a protracted government formation and four rounds of voting, Mariano Rajoy (PP) was re-elected Prime Minister with the support of the Cs on 29 October 2016 after the PSOE leadership chose to abstain.

On 29 October, Mariano Rajoy succeeded in his investiture attempt with the support of 170 MPs to 111 against and 68 abstentions.

Investiture; Congress of Deputies; Nomination of Mariano Rajoy (PP)
Ballot →	31 August 2016	2 September 2016
Required majority →	176 out of 350	Simple
Yes: • PP (134); • C's (32); • UPN (2); • CCa (1); • FAC (1)	170 / 350	170 / 350
No: • PSOE (84); • UP–ECP–EM (67); • ERC (9); • PDeCAT (8); • PNV (5); • Compromís (4); • EH Bildu (2); • NCa (1)	180 / 350	180 / 350
Abstentions	0 / 350	0 / 350
Absentees	0 / 350	0 / 350

Investiture; Congress of Deputies; Nomination of Mariano Rajoy (PP)
Ballot →	27 October 2016	29 October 2016
Required majority →	176 out of 350	Simple
Yes: • PP (134); • C's (32); • UPN (2); • CCa (1); • FAC (1)	170 / 350	170 / 350
No: • PSOE (84) (15 on 29 Oct); • UP–ECP–EM (67); • ERC (9); • PDeCAT (8); • PNV (5); • Compromís (4); • EH Bildu (2); • NCa (1)	180 / 350	111 / 350
Abstentions: • PSOE (68) (on 29 Oct)	0 / 350	68 / 350
Absentees: • PSOE (1) (on 29 Oct)	0 / 350	1 / 350

After the PSOE government refused to discuss right to self-determination for Catalonia, Catalan separatists joined the PP and Cs in voting down the 2019 General State Budget on 13 February 2019. On 15 February 2019 Prime Minister Sánchez announced that a snap election would be held on 28 April 2019. The 12th Cortes Generales was formally dissolved on 5 March 2019.

== Deaths, disqualifications and resignations ==
The 12th congress saw the following deaths, disqualifications and resignations:

- 8 August 2016 - María Such (PSOE) resigned after being appointed director of the Valencian Institute of Women and Gender Equality. She was replaced by Ciprià Ciscar (PSOE) on 24 August 2016.
- 22 August 2016 - Alejandro Ramírez (PP) died. He was replaced by Víctor Valentín Píriz (PP) on 29 August 2016.
- 20 September 2016 - María del Puerto Gallego (PSOE) resigned after being indicted for prevarication. He was replaced by Ricardo Cortés (PSOE) on 22 September 2016.
- 13 October 2016 - Domingo Lorenzo (Cs) resigned for personal reasons. He was replaced by María Sandra Juliá (Cs) on 17 October 2016.
- 17 October 2016 - Alfonso Alonso (PP) resigned after being elected to the Basque Parliament. He was replaced by Javier Ignacio Maroto (PP) on 18 October 2016.
- 29 October 2016 - Pedro Sánchez (POSE) resigned following an internal crisis in the PSOE. He was replaced by María Carlota Merchán (PSOE) on 15 November 2016.
- 18 November 2016 - Irene Garrido (PP) resigned after being appointed Secretary of State for the Economy. She was replaced by Tomás Javier Fole (PP) on 22 November 2016.
- 21 November 2016 - Matilde Asian (PP) and José Enrique Fernández (PP) resigned after being appointed Secretary of State for Tourism and Secretary of State for Finance respectively. They were replaced by Celia Alberto (PP) and Javier Calvente (PP) respectively on 22 November 2016.
- 25 November 2016 - Tomás Burgos (PP), José Antonio Nieto (PP) and Juan María Vazquez (PP) resigned after being appointed Secretary of State for Social Security, Secretary of State for Security and Secretary of State for Science and Innovation respectively. They were replaced by Raquel Lourdes Alonso (PP), Isabel Cabezas (PP) and Francisco Javier Ruano (PP) respectively on 29 November 2016.
- 28 November 2016 - Pedro Azpiazu (EAJ-PNV) resigned after being appointed Minister of Finance and Economy of the Basque Country. He was replaced by Idoia Sagastizabal (EAJ-PNV) on 13 December 2016.
- 28 November 2016 - Eloísa Cabrera (PP) resigned to prioritise her position as a municipal councillor. She was replaced by María del Carmen Navarro Cruz (PP) on 29 November 2016.
- 7 December 2016 - José María Lassalle (PP) resigned after being appointed Secretary of State for Information Society and Digital Agenda. He was replaced by Diego Movellán (PP) on 13 December 2016.
- 9 February 2017 - Ángeles Isac (PP) resigned in order to prepare for the 2019 municipal elections. She was replaced by María Torres (PP) on 14 February 2017.
- 29 March 2017 - Francesc Homs (PDeCAT) was disqualified for one year and one month by the Supreme Court for his role in the 2014 Catalan self-determination referendum. He was replaced by Feliu-Joan Guillaumes (PDeCAT) on 5 April 2017.
- 31 August 2017 - Antonio Trevín (PSOE) resigned following political disagreement with the PSOE leadership. He was replaced by Natalia González (PSOE) on 12 September 2017.
- 4 September 2017 - Eduardo Madina (PSOE) resigned following political disagreement with the PSOE leadership. He was replaced by José Enrique Serrano (PSOE) on 12 September 2017.
- 18 September 2017 - Carmen Álvarez-Arenas (PP) resigned following a scandal relating to non-declaration of income. She was replaced by Pilar Marcos (PP) on 19 September 2017.
- 9 November 2017 - Francisco Bernabé (PP) resigned after being appointed the national government's delegate in Murcia. He was replaced by María Dolores Bolarín (PP) on 14 November 2017.
- 14 November 2017 - Julián López (PSOE) resigned after being appointed Director-General of Analysis, Public Policies and Co-ordination of the Presidency of the Generalitat Valenciana. He was replaced by Herick Campos (PSOE) on 14 November 2017.
- 28 December 2017 - Jorge Moragas (PP) resigned after being appointed Spain's Permanent Representative to the United Nations. He was replaced by Ángeles Esteller (PP) on 6 February 2018.
- 17 January 2018 - Xavier Domènech (ECP) resigned after being elected to the Parliament of Catalonia. He was replaced by Alicia Ramos (ECP) on 6 February 2018.
- 1 June 2018 - Ester Capella (ERC–CatSí) and Teresa Jordà (ERC–CatSí) resigned after being appointed Minister of Justice and Minister of Agriculture, Livestock, Fisheries and Food of Catalonia respectively. They were replaced by Carolina Telechea (ERC–CatSí) and Joan Margall (ERC–CatSí) respectively on 12 June 2018.
- 15 June 2018 - José Luis Ábalos (PSOE), Meritxell Batet (PSOE) and Margarita Robles (PSOE) resigned after being appointed Minister of Public Works, Minister of Territorial Policy and Civil Service and Minister of Defence respectively. They were replaced by Alicia Piquer (PSOE), Mohammed Chaib (PSOE) and Gema López (PSOE) respectively on 19 June 2018.
- 15 June 2018 - Mariano Rajoy (PP) retired from politics after being ousted as Prime Minister. He was replaced by Valentina Martínez (PP) on 19 June 2018.
- 19 June 2018 - Manuel Gabriel González (PSOE) resigned after being appointed the national government's delegate in Castilla–La Mancha. He was replaced by Soledad Amada Velasco (PSOE) on 26 June 2018.
- 20 June 2018 - Ana Botella (PSOE) resigned after being appointed Secretary of State for Security. She was replaced by Antonio Quintana (PSOE) on 26 June 2018.
- 22 June 2018 - Pedro Saura (PSOE) resigned after being appointed Secretary of State for Infrastructure. He was replaced by Carmen Baños (PSOE) on 2 July 2018.
- 29 June 2018 - Ignacio Sánchez (PSOE) resigned after being appointed Secretary of State for Territorial Policy. He was replaced by Patricia Sierra (PSOE) on 2 July 2018.
- 29 June 2018 - Pablo Matos (PP) resigned after being appointed to the Canary Islands Advisory Council. He was replaced by Manuel Luis Torres (PP) on 2 July 2018.
- 10 September 2018 - Soraya Sáenz de Santamaría (PP) retired from politics. She was replaced by Mariano Pérez-Hickman (PP) on 11 September 2018.
- 14 November 2018 - María Dolores de Cospedal (PP) resigned following a scandal. She was replaced by Francisco Vañó (PP) on 20 November 2018.
- 26 December 2018 - Alfonso Candón (PP) resigned after being elected to the Parliament of Andalusia. He was replaced by Andrés Núñez (PP) on 22 January 2019.
- 21 January 2019 - Íñigo Errejón (UP) resigned following an internal crisis in Podemos. He was replaced by Sol Sánchez (Podemos) on 22 January 2019.
- 11 February 2019 - Juan Bravo (PP) resigned after being appointed Minister of Finance, Industry and Energy of Andalusia. He was replaced by Kissy Chandiramani (PP) on 12 February 2019.
- 15 February 2019 - Maria Rosa Martínez (UP) resigned after becoming the Elkarrekin Podemos's co-ordinator in the Basque Parliament. She was replaced by María Carmen Iglesias (UP) on 19 February 2019.
- 21 February 2019 - Rafael Merino (PP) resigned after being appointed director of the Public Agency of Ports of Andalusia. He was replaced by Manuel Torres (PP) on 21 February 2019.
- 22 February 2019 - Teófila Martínez (PP) resigned after being appointed president of the Port Authority of Cadiz. She was replaced by José Ignacio Romaní (PP) on 26 February 2019.

== Members ==
Name	Constituency	No.	Party	Alliance	Group	Took office	Left office	Notes
José Luis Ábalos	Valencia	2	PSPV–PSOE	PSOE	Socialist	8 July 2016	15 June 2018	Replaced by Alicia Piquer.
Pedro Acedo	Badajoz	3	PP	PP	People's	7 July 2016	5 March 2019	
Joseba Andoni Agirretxea	Gipuzkoa	1	EAJ/PNV		Basque	12 July 2016	5 March 2019	
Ernesto Aguiar	Santa Cruz	3	PP	PP	People's	5 July 2016	5 March 2019	
Ramón Aguirre	Guadalajara	2	PP	PP	People's	18 July 2016	5 March 2019	
Nagua Alba	Gipuzkoa	1	Podemos	UP	UP–ECP–EM (Note: Unidos Podemos–En Comú Podem–En Marea)	11 July 2016	5 March 2019	
María Dolores Alba	Alicante	5	PP	PP	People's	6 July 2016	5 March 2019	
Joaquín Albaladejo	Alicante	3	PP	PP	People's	13 July 2016	5 March 2019	
Celia Alberto	Las Palmas	4	PP	PP	People's	22 November 2016	5 March 2019	Replaces Matilde Asian.
Miriam Alconchel	Cádiz	2	PSOE–A	PSOE	Socialist	13 July 2016	5 March 2019	
Íñigo Alli	Navarre	1	UPN	PP	Mixed	12 July 2016	5 March 2019	
Alfonso Alonso	Álava	1	PP	PP	People's	14 July 2016	17 October 2016	Replaced by Javier Maroto.
Fèlix Alonso	Tarragona	1	EUiA	ECP	UP–ECP–EM	12 July 2016	5 March 2019	
José Jaime Alonso	Toledo	3	PP	PP	People's	5 July 2016	5 March 2019	
Raquel Lourdes Alonso	Valladolid	3	PP	PP	People's	29 November 2016	5 March 2019	Replaces Tomás Burgos.
Rosa Ana Alonso	Cantabria	1	Podemos	UP	UP–ECP–EM	13 July 2016	5 March 2019	
Ana Isabel Alós	Huesca	1	PP	PP	People's	12 July 2016	5 March 2019	
Ángeles Álvarez	Madrid	4	PSOE–M	PSOE	Socialist	7 July 2016	5 March 2019	
Félix Álvarez	Cantabria	1	C's	C's	Citizens	7 July 2016	5 March 2019	
Carmen Álvarez-Arenas	Madrid	9	PP	PP	People's	5 July 2016	18 September 2017	Replaced by Pilar Marcos.
María Teresa Angulo	Badajoz	1	PP	PP	People's	14 July 2016	5 March 2019	
Javier Antón	Soria	1	PSCyL–PSOE	PSOE	Socialist	12 July 2016	5 March 2019	
María Teresa Arévalo	Albacete	1	Podemos	UP	UP–ECP–EM	14 July 2016	5 March 2019	
Pedro Arrojo	Zaragoza	1	Podemos	UP	UP–ECP–EM	6 July 2016	5 March 2019	
Matilde Asian	Las Palmas	2	PP	PP	People's	6 July 2016	21 November 2016	Replaced by Celia Alberto.
José Luis Ayllón	Madrid	7	PP	PP	People's	14 July 2016	5 March 2019	
Pedro Azpiazu	Biscay	2	EAJ/PNV		Basque	12 July 2016	28 November 2016	Replaced by Idoia Sagastizabal.
María Luz Bajo	Madrid	11	PP	PP	People's	7 July 2016	5 March 2019	
Joan Baldoví	Valencia	1	Compromís	ALV	Mixed	12 July 2016	5 March 2019	
Àngela Ballester	Valencia	2	Podemos	ALV	UP–ECP–EM	12 July 2016	5 March 2019	
Fátima Báñez	Huelva	1	PP	PP	People's	15 July 2016	5 March 2019	
Carmen Baños	Murcia	5	PSRM–PSOE	PSOE	Socialist	2 July 2018	5 March 2019	Replaces Pedro Saura.
Iñigo Barandiaran	Gipuzkoa	2	EAJ/PNV		Basque	12 July 2016	5 March 2019	
Miguel Barrachina	Castellón	1	PP	PP	People's	12 July 2016	5 March 2019	
Leopoldo Barreda	Biscay	1	PP	PP	People's	6 July 2016	5 March 2019	
José María Barreda	Ciudad Real	2	PSCM–PSOE	PSOE	Socialist	6 July 2016	5 March 2019	
José María Barrios	Zamora	2	PP	PP	People's	5 July 2016	5 March 2019	
Elena Bastidas	Valencia	1	PP	PP	People's	6 July 2016	5 March 2019	
Enric Bataller	Valencia	3	Compromís	ALV	Mixed	12 July 2016	5 March 2019	
Meritxell Batet	Barcelona	1	PSC	PSOE	Socialist	13 July 2016	15 June 2018	Replaced by Mohammed Chaib.
Marian Beitialarrangoitia	Gipuzkoa	1	Sortu	EH Bildu	Mixed	18 July 2016	5 March 2019	
Ferran Bel	Tarragona	1	CDC (Note: Catalan European Democratic Party (PDeCAT) from July 2016.)	CDC	Mixed	14 July 2016	5 March 2019	
Ione Belarra	Navarre	1	Podemos	UP	UP–ECP–EM	11 July 2016	5 March 2019	
Pablo Bellido	Guadalajara	1	PSCM–PSOE	PSOE	Socialist	8 July 2016	5 March 2019	
José Antonio Bermúdez	Salamanca	1	PP	PP	People's	14 July 2016	5 March 2019	
Francisco Bernabé	Murcia	2	PP	PP	People's	6 July 2016	9 November 2017	Replaced by María Dolores Bolarín.
Carolina Bescansa	Madrid	2	Podemos	UP	UP–ECP–EM	13 July 2016	5 March 2019	
María del Mar Blanco	Madrid	14	PP	PP	People's	7 July 2016	5 March 2019	
Patricia Blanquer	Alicante	2	PSPV–PSOE	PSOE	Socialist	5 July 2016	5 March 2019	
Manuel Blasco	Teruel	1	PP	PP	People's	5 July 2016	5 March 2019	
María Dolores Bolarín	Murcia	7	PP	PP	People's	14 November 2017	5 March 2019	Replaces Francisco Bernabé.
María Jesús Bonilla	Cuenca	2	PP	PP	People's	7 July 2016	5 March 2019	
Isabel María Borrego	Murcia	3	PP	PP	People's	6 July 2016	5 March 2019	
Rita Bosaho	Alicante	1	Podemos	ALV	UP–ECP–EM	12 July 2016	5 March 2019	
Amparo Botejara	Badajoz	1	Podemos	UP	UP–ECP–EM	12 July 2016	5 March 2019	
Ana Botella	Valencia	1	PSPV–PSOE	PSOE	Socialist	12 July 2016	20 June 2018	Replaced by Antonio Quintana.
Juan Bravo	Ceuta	1	PP	PP	People's	7 July 2016	11 February 2019	Replaced by Kissy Chandiramani.
Tomás Burgos	Valladolid	1	PP	PP	People's	7 July 2016	25 November 2016	Replaced by Raquel Alonso.
Miguel Ángel Bustamante	Seville	3	PCA	UP	UP–ECP–EM	12 July 2016	5 March 2019	
Pablo Bustinduy	Madrid	8	Podemos	UP	UP–ECP–EM	14 July 2016	5 March 2019	
Isabel Cabezas	Córdoba	4	PP	PP	People's	29 November 2016	5 March 2019	Replaces José Antonio Nieto.
Eloísa Cabrera	Almería	3	PP	PP	People's	6 July 2016	28 November 2016	Replaced by Carmen Navarro.
Javier Calvente	Jaén	3	PP	PP	People's	22 November 2016	5 March 2019	Replaces José Enrique Fernández.
José Miguel Camacho	Toledo	2	PSCM–PSOE	PSOE	Socialist	5 July 2016	5 March 2019	
Gregorio Cámara	Granada	2	PSOE–A	PSOE	Socialist	13 July 2016	5 March 2019	
Juan Carlos Campo	Cádiz	3	PSOE–A	PSOE	Socialist	5 July 2016	5 March 2019	
Herick Campos	Alicante	3	PSPV–PSOE	PSOE	Socialist	14 November 2017	5 March 2019	Replaces Julián López.
Gerardo Camps	Alicante	4	PP	PP	People's	8 July 2016	5 March 2019	
Carles Campuzano	Barcelona	2	CDC	CDC	Mixed	5 July 2016	5 March 2019	
Pilar Cancela	A Coruña	1	PSdeG–PSOE	PSOE	Socialist	13 July 2016	5 March 2019	
Ignasi Candela	Alicante	2	Compromís	ALV	Mixed	12 July 2016	5 March 2019	
Alfonso Candón	Cádiz	3	PP	PP	People's	6 July 2016	26 December 2018	Replaced by Andrés Núñez.
José Cano	Alicante	2	C's	C's	Citizens	6 July 2016	5 March 2019	
Francisco Javier Cano	Cádiz	1	C's	C's	Citizens	7 July 2016	5 March 2019	
Zaida Cantera	Madrid	6	Independent	PSOE	Socialist	6 July 2016	5 March 2019	
Toni Cantó	Valencia	1	C's	C's	Citizens	14 July 2016	5 March 2019	
Diego Cañamero	Jaén	1	Podemos	UP	UP–ECP–EM	14 July 2016	5 March 2019	
Joan Capdevila	Barcelona	5	Independent	ERC–CatSí	Republican Left	18 July 2016	5 March 2019	
Ester Capella	Barcelona	3	ERC	ERC–CatSí	Republican Left	14 July 2016	1 June 2018	Replaced by Carolina Telechea.
José David Carracedo	Biscay	3	Podemos	UP	UP–ECP–EM	15 July 2016	5 March 2019	
María Ascensión Carreño	Murcia	5	PP	PP	People's	7 July 2016	5 March 2019	
Sara Carreño	La Rioja	1	Podemos	UP	UP–ECP–EM	18 July 2016	5 March 2019	
Pablo Casado	Ávila	1	PP	PP	People's	14 July 2016	5 March 2019	
Loreto Cascales	Alicante	2	PP	PP	People's	7 July 2016	5 March 2019	
Sofía Castañón	Asturias	1	Podemos	UP	UP–ECP–EM	13 July 2016	5 March 2019	
Rafael Catalá	Cuenca	1	PP	PP	People's	8 July 2016	5 March 2019	
Mohammed Chaib	Barcelona	6	PSC	PSOE	Socialist	19 June 2018	5 March 2019	Replaces Meritxell Batet.
Kissy Chandiramani	Ceuta	S	PP	PP	People's	12 February 2019	5 March 2019	Replaces Juan Bravo.
José María Chiquillo	Valencia	4	PP	PP	People's	13 July 2016	5 March 2019	
Ciprià Ciscar	Valencia	4	PSPV–PSOE	PSOE	Socialist	24 August 2016	5 March 2019	Replaces María Such.
Lourdes Ciuró	Barcelona	3	CDC	CDC	Mixed	12 July 2016	5 March 2019	
Óscar Clavell	Castellón	2	PP	PP	People's	8 July 2016	5 March 2019	
Diego Clemente	Almería	1	C's	C's	Citizens	7 July 2016	5 March 2019	
Pilar Cortés	Zaragoza	2	PP	PP	People's	5 July 2016	5 March 2019	
Ricardo Cortés	Cantabria	2	PSC	PSOE	Socialist	22 September 2016	5 March 2019	Replaces María del Puerto Gallego.
Mar Cotelo	La Rioja	2	PPR	PP	People's	6 July 2016	5 March 2019	
Carmen Rocío Cuello	Seville	4	PSOE–A	PSOE	Socialist	11 July 2016	5 March 2019	
Manuel Cruz	Barcelona	2	Independent	PSOE	Socialist	13 July 2016	5 March 2019	
Bienvenido de Arriba	Salamanca	3	PP	PP	People's	5 July 2016	5 March 2019	
Avelino de Barrionuevo	Málaga	3	PP	PP	People's	5 July 2016	5 March 2019	
María Dolores de Cospedal	Toledo	1	PP	PP	People's	14 July 2016	14 November 2018	Replaced by Francisco Vañó.
María del Rocío de Frutos	Ourense	1	PSdeG–PSOE	PSOE	Socialist	13 July 2016	5 March 2019	
María Teresa de Lara	Madrid	8	PP	PP	People's	5 July 2016	5 March 2019	
Teófilo de Luis	Madrid	10	PP	PP	People's	6 July 2016	5 March 2019	
Jaime Eduardo de Olano	Lugo	2	PP	PP	People's	8 July 2016	5 March 2019	
Sergio del Campo	Tarragona	1	C's	C's	Citizens	14 July 2016	5 March 2019	
Juan Manuel del Olmo	Valladolid	1	Podemos	UP	UP–ECP–EM	5 July 2016	5 March 2019	
Emilio del Río	La Rioja	1	PPR	PP	People's	6 July 2016	5 March 2019	
Concepción de Santa Ana	Granada	3	PP	PP	People's	6 July 2016	5 March 2019	
Mae de la Concha	Balearic Islands	1	Podemos	UP-MES	UP–ECP–EM	18 July 2016	5 March 2019	
Salvador Antonio de la Encina	Cádiz	1	PSOE–A	PSOE	Socialist	7 July 2016	5 March 2019	
Francisco de la Torre	Madrid	2	C's	C's	Citizens	6 July 2016	5 March 2019	
Celso Luis Delgado	Ourense	2	PP	PP	People's	5 July 2016	5 March 2019	
Juan Antonio Delgado	Cádiz	2	Podemos	UP	UP–ECP–EM	7 July 2016	5 March 2019	
Guillermo Díaz	Málaga	2	C's	C's	Citizens	7 July 2016	5 March 2019	
José Juan Díaz	Huelva	1	PSOE–A	PSOE	Socialist	13 July 2016	5 March 2019	
Yolanda Díaz	A Coruña	2	EU	En Marea	UP–ECP–EM	12 July 2016	5 March 2019	
Xavier Domènech	Barcelona	1	BComú	ECP	UP–ECP–EM	13 July 2016	17 January 2018	Replaced by Alicia Ramos.
María del Carmen Dueñas	Melilla	1	PP	PP	People's	12 July 2016	5 March 2019	
José Ignacio Echániz	Madrid	12	PP	PP	People's	7 July 2016	5 March 2019	
Gloria Elizo	Toledo	1	Podemos	UP	UP–ECP–EM	8 July 2016	5 March 2019	Fourth Vice-President.
Odón Elorza	Gipuzkoa	1	PSE–EE (PSOE)	PSOE	Socialist	12 July 2016	5 March 2019	
Xavier Eritja	Lleida	1	ERC	ERC–CatSí	Republican Left	18 July 2016	5 March 2019	
Íñigo Errejón	Madrid	3	Podemos	UP	UP–ECP–EM	11 July 2016	21 January 2019	Replaced by Sol Sánchez.
Beatriz Marta Escudero	Segovia	1	PP	PP	People's	6 July 2016	5 March 2019	
Carolina España	Málaga	1	PP	PP	People's	5 July 2016	5 March 2019	
Aitor Esteban	Biscay	1	EAJ/PNV		Basque	12 July 2016	5 March 2019	
Ángeles Esteller	Barcelona	5	PP	PP	People's	6 February 2018	5 March 2019	Replaces Jorge Moragas.
Marcelo Expósito	Barcelona	8	BComú	ECP	UP–ECP–EM	7 July 2016	5 March 2019	Third Secretary.
Elena Faba	Barcelona	3	C's	C's	Citizens	13 July 2016	5 March 2019	
Sònia Farré	Barcelona	4	Podemos	ECP	UP–ECP–EM	12 July 2016	5 March 2019	
Alexandra Fernández	Pontevedra	1	Anova	En Marea	UP–ECP–EM	18 July 2016	5 March 2019	
Eduardo Fernández	León	1	PP	PP	People's	6 July 2016	5 March 2019	
Jesús María Fernández	Navarre	1	PSN–PSOE	PSOE	Socialist	12 July 2016	5 March 2019	
Jorge Fernández	Barcelona	1	PP	PP	People's	8 July 2016	5 March 2019	
José Enrique Fernández	Jaén	1	PP	PP	People's	7 July 2016	21 November 2016	Replaced by Javier Calvente.
Miguel Anxo Elías Fernández	Lugo	1	Anova	En Marea	UP–ECP–EM	18 July 2016	5 March 2019	
Sonia Ferrer	Almería	1	PSOE–A	PSOE	Socialist	12 July 2016	5 March 2019	
María Aurora Flórez	León	1	PSCyL–PSOE	PSOE	Socialist	14 July 2016	5 March 2019	
Carlos Javier Floriano	Cáceres	1	PP	PP	People's	6 July 2016	5 March 2019	
Tomás Javier Fole	Pontevedra	5	PP	PP	People's	22 November 2016	5 March 2019	Replaces Irene Garrido.
Isabel Franco Sánchez	Huelva	1	Podemos	UP	UP–ECP–EM	11 July 2016	5 March 2019	
Sebastián Franquis	Las Palmas	1	PSC–PSOE	PSOE	Socialist	8 July 2016	5 March 2019	
Oscar Galeano	Zaragoza	2	PSOE–Aragón	PSOE	Socialist	6 July 2016	5 March 2019	
María del Puerto Gallego	Cantabria	1	PSC	PSOE	Socialist	7 July 2016	20 September 2016	Replaced by Ricardo Cortés.
María Dolores Galovart	Pontevedra	1	PSdeG–PSOE	PSOE	Socialist	18 July 2016	5 March 2019	
Óscar Gamazo	Valencia	6	PP	PP	People's	14 July 2016	5 March 2019	
Miguel Ángel Garaulet	Murcia	1	C's	C's	Citizens	7 July 2016	5 March 2019	
Eva García	Málaga	2	IULV–CA	UP	UP–ECP–EM	12 July 2016	5 March 2019	
Isabel García	Madrid	3	PP	PP	People's	15 July 2016	5 March 2019	
Joaquín María García	Lugo	1	PP	PP	People's	18 July 2016	5 March 2019	
José Ramón García Cañal	Asturias	3	PP	PP	People's	13 July 2016	5 March 2019	
José Ramón García Hernández	Ávila	2	PP	PP	People's	6 July 2016	5 March 2019	
Maria del Mar Garcia	Barcelona	6	Podemos	ECP	UP–ECP–EM	13 July 2016	5 March 2019	
Ricardo Antonio García	A Coruña	2	PSdeG–PSOE	PSOE	Socialist	7 July 2016	5 March 2019	
Teodoro García	Murcia	1	PP	PP	People's	6 July 2016	5 March 2019	
José Manuel García-Margallo	Alicante	1	PP	PP	People's	11 July 2016	5 March 2019	
María José García-Pelayo	Cádiz	2	PP	PP	People's	8 July 2016	5 March 2019	
Arturo García-Tizón	Toledo	2	PP	PP	People's	5 July 2016	5 March 2019	
Irene Garrido	Pontevedra	2	PP	PP	People's	5 July 2016	18 November 2016	Replaced by Tomás Fole.
Alberto Garzón	Madrid	5	PCM	UP	UP–ECP–EM	12 July 2016	5 March 2019	
Juan Carlos Girauta	Barcelona	1	C's	C's	Citizens	18 July 2016	5 March 2019	
Marcial Gómez	Córdoba	1	C's	C's	Citizens	7 July 2016	5 March 2019	
Rodrigo Gómez	Zaragoza	1	C's	C's	Citizens	7 July 2016	5 March 2019	
Antonio Gómez-Reino	A Coruña	1	Podemos	En Marea	UP–ECP–EM	18 July 2016	5 March 2019	
Ángel Luis González	Málaga	4	PP	PP	People's	12 July 2016	5 March 2019	
Antonio Pablo González	Madrid	13	PP	PP	People's	8 July 2016	5 March 2019	
Josefa Inmaculada González	Huelva	2	PSOE–A	PSOE	Socialist	11 July 2016	5 March 2019	
Manuel Gabriel González	Albacete	1	PSCM–PSOE	PSOE	Socialist	12 July 2016	19 June 2018	Replaced by Soledad Velasco.
María González	Murcia	1	PSRM–PSOE	PSOE	Socialist	8 July 2016	5 March 2019	
María del Carmen González	León	2	PP	PP	People's	7 July 2016	5 March 2019	
Marta González	A Coruña	2	PP	PP	People's	6 July 2016	5 March 2019	
Natalia González	Asturias	3	FSA–PSOE	PSOE	Socialist	12 September 2017	5 March 2019	Replaces Antonio Trevín.
Segundo González	Asturias	2	Podemos	UP	UP–ECP–EM	18 July 2016	5 March 2019	
Juan Luis Gordo	Segovia	1	PSCyL–PSOE	PSOE	Socialist	8 July 2016	5 March 2019	Second Secretary.
Txema Guijarro	Alicante	3	Podemos	ALV	UP–ECP–EM	15 July 2016	5 March 2019	
Feliu-Joan Guillaumes	Barcelona	5	CDC	CDC	Mixed	5 April 2017	5 March 2019	Replaces Francesc Homs.
Lídia Guinart	Barcelona	5	PSC	PSOE	Socialist	13 July 2016	5 March 2019	
Antonio Gutiérrez	Seville	3	PSOE–A	PSOE	Socialist	8 July 2016	5 March 2019	
Miguel Ángel Gutiérrez	Madrid	4	C's	C's	Citizens	7 July 2016	5 March 2019	
Miguel Ángel Heredia	Málaga	1	PSOE–A	PSOE	Socialist	6 July 2016	5 March 2019	
Silvia Heredia	Seville	4	PP	PP	People's	7 July 2016	5 March 2019	
María del Carmen Hernández	Las Palmas	1	PP	PP	People's	6 July 2016	5 March 2019	
Antonio Hernando	Madrid	3	PSOE–M	PSOE	Socialist	13 July 2016	5 March 2019	
Rafael Hernando	Almería	1	PP	PP	People's	6 July 2016	5 March 2019	
Sofía Hernanz	Balearic Islands	1	PSIB	PSOE	Socialist	14 July 2016	5 March 2019	
José Alberto Herrero	Teruel	2	PP	PP	People's	11 July 2016	5 March 2019	
Francesc Homs	Barcelona	1	CDC	CDC	Mixed	5 July 2016	29 March 2017	Replaced by Feliu Guillaumes.
María Auxiliadora Honorato	Seville	2	Podemos	UP	UP–ECP–EM	8 July 2016	5 March 2019	
Belén Hoyo	Valencia	2	PP	PP	People's	12 July 2016	5 March 2019	
Antonio Hurtado	Córdoba	2	PSOE–A	PSOE	Socialist	7 July 2016	5 March 2019	
Francisco Igea	Valladolid	1	C's	C's	Citizens	5 July 2016	5 March 2019	
María Carmen Iglesias	Biscay	5	Podemos	UP	UP–ECP–EM	19 February 2019	5 March 2019	Replaces Maria Rosa Martínez.
Pablo Iglesias	Madrid	1	Podemos	UP	UP–ECP–EM	8 July 2016	5 March 2019	
Ángeles Isac	Jaén	2	PP	PP	People's	11 July 2016	9 February 2017	Replaced by María Torres.
Juan Jiménez	Almería	2	PSOE–A	PSOE	Socialist	18 July 2016	5 March 2019	
Teresa Jordà	Girona	1	ERC	ERC–CatSí	Republican Left	18 July 2016	1 June 2018	Replaced by Joan Margall.
María Sandra Juliá	Castellón	2	C's	C's	Citizens	17 October 2016	5 March 2019	Replaces Domingo Lorenzo.
Juan Manuel Juncal	A Coruña	3	PP	PP	People's	7 July 2016	5 March 2019	
Marc Lamuà	Girona	1	PSC	PSOE	Socialist	13 July 2016	5 March 2019	
José Javier Lasarte	Álava	1	PSE–EE (PSOE)	PSOE	Socialist	5 July 2016	5 March 2019	
José María Lassalle	Cantabria	2	PP	PP	People's	6 July 2016	7 December 2016	Replaced by Diego Movellán.
Adriana Lastra	Asturias	1	FSA–PSOE	PSOE	Socialist	14 July 2016	5 March 2019	
Mikel Legarda	Álava	1	EAJ/PNV		Basque	12 July 2016	5 March 2019	
Gema López	Madrid	10	Independent	PSOE	Socialist	19 June 2018	5 March 2019	Replaces Margarita Robles.
José Ignacio Llorens	Lleida	1	PP	PP	People's	7 July 2016	5 March 2019	
Julián López	Alicante	1	PSPV–PSOE	PSOE	Socialist	5 July 2016	14 November 2017	Replaced by Herick Campos.
Patxi López	Biscay	1	PSE–EE (PSOE)	PSOE	Socialist	7 July 2016	5 March 2019	
Susana López	Asturias	1	PP	PP	People's	12 July 2016	5 March 2019	
Juan López de Uralde	Álava	1	Equo	UP	UP–ECP–EM	11 July 2016	5 March 2019	
Domingo Lorenzo	Castellón	1	C's	C's	Citizens	12 July 2016	13 October 2016	Replaced by María Sandra Juliá.
Miguel Lorenzo	A Coruña	1	PP	PP	People's	14 July 2016	5 March 2019	
María del Pilar Lucio	Cáceres	1	PSOE–E	PSOE	Socialist	8 July 2016	5 March 2019	
César Luena	La Rioja	1	PSOE–LR	PSOE	Socialist	7 July 2016	5 March 2019	
Jorge Luis	Huesca	1	Equo	UP	UP–ECP–EM	6 July 2016	5 March 2019	
Eduardo Madina	Madrid	7	PSOE–M	PSOE	Socialist	7 July 2016	4 September 2017	Replaced by José Enrique Serrano.
Ana María Madrazo	Cantabria	1	PP	PP	People's	12 July 2016	5 March 2019	
Ana Marcello	León	1	Podemos	UP	UP–ECP–EM	18 July 2016	5 March 2019	
Pilar Marcos	Madrid	16	PP	PP	People's	19 September 2017	5 March 2019	Replaces Carmen Álvarez-Arenas.
María Dolores Marcos	Cáceres	2	PP	PP	People's	6 July 2016	5 March 2019	
Joan Margall	Girona	3	ERC	ERC–CatSí	Republican Left	12 June 2018	5 March 2019	Replaces Teresa Jordà.
José Vicente Marí	Balearic Islands	2	PPIB	PP	People's	7 July 2016	5 March 2019	
Guillermo Carlos Mariscal	Las Palmas	3	PP	PP	People's	15 July 2016	5 March 2019	
Javier Ignacio Maroto	Álava	2	PP	PP	People's	18 October 2016	5 March 2019	Replaces Alfonso Alonso.
Guadalupe Martín	Toledo	1	PSCM–PSOE	PSOE	Socialist	5 July 2016	5 March 2019	
Lucía Martín	Barcelona	2	BComú	ECP	UP–ECP–EM	13 July 2016	5 March 2019	
Marta Martín	Alicante	1	C's	C's	Citizens	5 July 2016	5 March 2019	
José Alberto Martín-Toledano	Ciudad Real	3	PP	PP	People's	7 July 2016	5 March 2019	
Francisco Martínez	Madrid	15	PP	PP	People's	13 July 2016	5 March 2019	
Isidro Manuel Martínez Oblanca	Asturias	2	Foro	PP	Mixed	8 July 2016	5 March 2019	
José Luis Martínez	Murcia	2	C's	C's	Citizens	7 July 2016	5 March 2019	
María Luz Martínez Seijo	Palencia	1	PSCyL–PSOE	PSOE	Socialist	14 July 2016	5 March 2019	
Maria Rosa Martínez	Biscay	2	Equo	UP	UP–ECP–EM	11 July 2016	15 February 2019	Replaced by María Carmen Iglesias.
Valentina Martínez	Madrid	17	PP	PP	People's	19 June 2018	5 March 2019	Replaces Mariano Rajoy.
Teófila Martínez	Cádiz	1	PP	PP	People's	8 July 2016	22 February 2019	Replaced by José Ignacio Romaní.
Fernando Martínez-Maíllo	Zamora	1	PP	PP	People's	5 July 2016	5 March 2019	
Juan José Matarí	Almería	2	PP	PP	People's	6 July 2016	5 March 2019	
Jaime Mateu	Burgos	1	PP	PP	People's	4 July 2016	5 March 2019	
Pablo Matos	Santa Cruz	2	PP	PP	People's	6 July 2016	29 June 2018	Replaced by Manuel Luis Torres.
Oskar Matute	Biscay	1	Alternatiba	EH Bildu	Mixed	18 July 2016	5 March 2019	
Fernando Maura	Madrid	6	Independent	C's	Citizens	12 July 2016	5 March 2019	
Eduardo Maura	Biscay	1	Podemos	UP	UP–ECP–EM	11 July 2016	5 March 2019	
Rafael Mayoral	Madrid	6	Podemos	UP	UP–ECP–EM	13 July 2016	5 March 2019	
Guillermo Antonio Meijón	Pontevedra	2	PSdeG–PSOE	PSOE	Socialist	8 July 2016	5 March 2019	
Joan Miquel Mena	Barcelona	7	EUiA	ECP	UP–ECP–EM	13 July 2016	5 March 2019	
Íñigo Méndez	Palencia	1	PP	PP	People's	6 July 2016	5 March 2019	
María Carlota Merchán	Madrid	8	PSOE–M	PSOE	Socialist	15 November 2016	5 March 2019	Replaces Pedro Sánchez.
Rafael Merino	Córdoba	2	PP	PP	People's	14 July 2016	21 February 2019	Replaced by Manuel Torres Fernández.
María Virginia Millán	Seville	1	C's	C's	Citizens	7 July 2016	5 March 2019	
Sergi Miquel	Girona	2	CDC	CDC	Mixed	5 July 2016	5 March 2019	
Francisco Molinero	Albacete	2	PP	PP	People's	7 July 2016	5 March 2019	
María Sandra Moneo	Burgos	2	PP	PP	People's	15 July 2016	5 March 2019	
Manuel Enrique Monereo	Córdoba	1	Podemos	UP	UP–ECP–EM	11 July 2016	5 March 2019	
Irene Montero	Madrid	4	Podemos	UP	UP–ECP–EM	8 July 2016	5 March 2019	
Alberto Montero	Málaga	1	Podemos	UP	UP–ECP–EM	5 July 2016	5 March 2019	
Cristóbal Montoro	Madrid	4	PP	PP	People's	12 July 2016	5 March 2019	
Dolors Montserrat	Barcelona	4	PP	PP	People's	6 July 2016	5 March 2019	
Jorge Moragas	Barcelona	2	PP	PP	People's	14 July 2016	28 December 2017	Replaced by Ángeles Esteller.
Tristana Moraleja	A Coruña	4	PP	PP	People's	14 July 2016	5 March 2019	
Ramón Moreno	Zaragoza	3	PP	PP	People's	12 July 2016	5 March 2019	
Rubén Moreno	Valencia	3	PP	PP	People's	5 July 2016	5 March 2019	
María Jesús Moro	Salamanca	2	PP	PP	People's	5 July 2016	5 March 2019	
Diego Movellán	Cantabria	3	PP	PP	People's	13 December 2016	5 March 2019	Replaces José María Lassalle.
Jaume Moya	Lleida	1	ICV	UP	UP–ECP–EM	13 July 2016	5 March 2019	
Pedro José Muñoz	Ávila	1	PSCyL–PSOE	PSOE	Socialist	8 July 2016	5 March 2019	
Álvaro Nadal	Madrid	5	PP	PP	People's	14 July 2016	5 March 2019	
María del Carmen Navarro Cruz	Almería	4	PP	PP	People's	29 November 2016	5 March 2019	Replaces Eloísa Cabrera.
Fernando Navarro	Balearic Islands	1	C's	C's	Citizens	5 July 2016	5 March 2019	
Micaela Navarro	Jaén	1	PSOE–A	PSOE	Socialist	7 July 2016	5 March 2019	Second Vice-President.
María del Carmen Navarro Lacoba	Albacete	1	PP	PP	People's	11 July 2016	5 March 2019	
José Antonio Nieto	Córdoba	1	PP	PP	People's	11 July 2016	25 November 2016	Replaced by Isabel Cabezas.
Míriam Nogueras	Barcelona	4	Independent	CDC	Mixed	12 July 2016	5 March 2019	
Andrés Núñez	Cádiz	4	PP	PP	People's	22 January 2019	5 March 2019	Replaces Alfonso Candón.
Joan Olóriz	Girona	2	ERC	ERC–CatSí	Republican Left	18 July 2016	5 March 2019	
Ana María Oramas	Santa Cruz	1	CC		Mixed	7 July 2016	5 March 2019	
Gonzalo Palacín	Huesca	1	PSOE–Aragón	PSOE	Socialist	18 July 2016	5 March 2019	
Teresa Palmer	Balearic Islands	1	PPIB	PP	People's	12 July 2016	5 March 2019	
Miguel Ángel Paniagua	Palencia	2	PP	PP	People's	7 July 2016	5 March 2019	
Sergio Pascual	Seville	1	Podemos	UP	UP–ECP–EM	8 July 2016	5 March 2019	
Ana Pastor	Pontevedra	1	PP	PP	People's	5 July 2016	5 March 2019	President.
Rosana Pastor	Valencia	4	Independent	ALV	UP–ECP–EM	12 July 2016	5 March 2019	
Esther Peña	Burgos	1	PSCyL–PSOE	PSOE	Socialist	14 July 2016	5 March 2019	
Mercè Perea	Barcelona	3	PSC	PSOE	Socialist	13 July 2016	5 March 2019	
Juan Vicente Pérez	Valencia	5	PP	PP	People's	6 July 2016	5 March 2019	
Margarita Pérez	Lugo	1	PSdeG–PSOE	PSOE	Socialist	4 July 2016	5 March 2019	
María Soledad Pérez	Badajoz	1	PSOE–E	PSOE	Socialist	8 July 2016	5 March 2019	
Santiago Pérez	Granada	2	PP	PP	People's	6 July 2016	5 March 2019	
Mariano Pérez-Hickman	Madrid	18	PP	PP	People's	11 September 2018	5 March 2019	Replaces Soraya Sáenz de Santamaría.
Alicia Piquer	Valencia	5	PSPV–PSOE	PSOE	Socialist	19 June 2018	5 March 2019	Replaces José Luis Ábalos.
Víctor Valentín Píriz	Badajoz	4	PP	PP	People's	29 August 2016	5 March 2019	Replaces Alejandro Ramírez.
María del Carmen Pita	Las Palmas	1	Podemos	UP	UP–ECP–EM	8 July 2016	5 March 2019	
Pere Joan Pons	Balearic Islands	2	PSIB	PSOE	Socialist	14 July 2016	5 March 2019	
Jesús Posada	Soria	1	PP	PP	People's	7 July 2016	5 March 2019	
Jesús Juan Bautista Postigo	Segovia	2	PP	PP	People's	6 July 2016	5 March 2019	
Antoni Postius	Lleida	1	CDC	CDC	Mixed	18 July 2016	5 March 2019	
Antonio Francisco Pradas	Seville	1	PSOE–A	PSOE	Socialist	8 July 2016	5 March 2019	
Ignacio Prendes	Asturias	1	C's	C's	Citizens	14 July 2016	5 March 2019	First Vice-President.
Pedro Quevedo	Las Palmas	2	NCa	PSOE	Mixed	18 July 2016	5 March 2019	
Antonio Quintana	Valencia	6	PSPV–PSOE	PSOE	Socialist	26 June 2018	5 March 2019	Replaces Ana Botella.
María del Carmen Quintanilla	Ciudad Real	2	PP	PP	People's	5 July 2016	5 March 2019	
Mariano Rajoy	Madrid	1	PP	PP	People's	7 July 2016	15 June 2018	Replaced by Valentina Martínez.
Artemi Rallo	Castellón	1	PSPV–PSOE	PSOE	Socialist	13 July 2016	5 March 2019	
Alejandro Ramírez	Badajoz	2	PP	PP	People's	7 July 2016	22 August 2016	Replaced by Víctor Píriz.
Saúl Ramírez	Las Palmas	1	C's	C's	Citizens	7 July 2016	5 March 2019	
Elvira Ramón	Granada	1	PSOE–A	PSOE	Socialist	8 July 2016	5 March 2019	
Alicia Ramos	Barcelona	10	BComú	ECP	UP–ECP–EM	6 February 2018	5 March 2019	Replaces Xavier Domènech.
César Joaquín Ramos	Cáceres	2	PSOE–E	PSOE	Socialist	6 July 2016	5 March 2019	
María Tamara Raya	Santa Cruz	1	PSC–PSOE	PSOE	Socialist	18 July 2016	5 March 2019	
Patricia Reyes	Madrid	5	C's	C's	Citizens	5 July 2016	5 March 2019	Fourth Secretary.
Águeda Reynés	Balearic Islands	3	PPIB	PP	People's	12 July 2016	5 March 2019	
Albert Rivera	Madrid	1	C's	C's	Citizens	7 July 2016	5 March 2019	
Irene Rivera	Málaga	1	C's	C's	Citizens	12 July 2016	5 March 2019	
Marta Rivera	Madrid	3	C's	C's	Citizens	7 July 2016	5 March 2019	
Margarita Robles	Madrid	2	Independent	PSOE	Socialist	6 July 2016	15 June 2018	Replaced by Gema López.
Jordi Roca	Tarragona	1	PP	PP	People's	7 July 2016	5 March 2019	
Alberto Rodríguez	Santa Cruz	1	Podemos	UP	UP–ECP–EM	18 July 2016	5 March 2019	
Ángela Rodríguez	Pontevedra	2	Podemos	En Marea	UP–ECP–EM	18 July 2016	5 March 2019	
Isabel Rodríguez	Ciudad Real	1	PSCM–PSOE	PSOE	Socialist	12 July 2016	5 March 2019	
Juana Amalia Rodríguez	Seville	2	PSOE–A	PSOE	Socialist	14 July 2016	5 March 2019	
María Soraya Rodríguez	Valladolid	1	PSCyL–PSOE	PSOE	Socialist	8 July 2016	5 March 2019	
Melisa Rodríguez	Santa Cruz	1	C's	C's	Citizens	18 July 2016	5 March 2019	
Carlos Rojas	Granada	1	PP	PP	People's	14 July 2016	5 March 2019	
Pilar Milagros Rojo	Pontevedra	3	PP	PP	People's	7 July 2016	5 March 2019	
Antonio Roldán	Barcelona	2	C's	C's	Citizens	7 July 2016	5 March 2019	
José Ignacio Romaní	Cádiz	5	PP	PP	People's	26 February 2019	5 March 2019	Replaces Teófila Martínez.
Carmelo Romero	Huelva	2	PP	PP	People's	13 July 2016	5 March 2019	
María Eugenia Romero	Seville	3	PP	PP	People's	6 July 2016	5 March 2019	
Rosa Romero	Ciudad Real	1	PP	PP	People's	6 July 2016	5 March 2019	Third Vice-President.
María del Mar Rominguera	Zamora	1	PSCyL–PSOE	PSOE	Socialist	11 July 2016	5 March 2019	
Francisco Javier Ruano	Murcia	6	PP	PP	People's	29 November 2016	5 March 2019	Replaces Juan María Vazquez.
Gabriel Rufián	Barcelona	1	Independent	ERC–CatSí	Republican Left	18 July 2016	5 March 2019	
Joan Ruiz	Tarragona	1	PSC	PSOE	Socialist	13 July 2016	5 March 2019	
Soraya Sáenz de Santamaría	Madrid	2	PP	PP	People's	14 July 2016	10 September 2018	Replaced by Mariano Pérez-Hickman.
Idoia Sagastizabal	Biscay	7	EAJ/PNV		Basque	13 December 2016	5 March 2019	Replaces Pedro Azpiazu.
Luis Carlos Sahuquillo	Cuenca	1	PSCM–PSOE	PSOE	Socialist	4 July 2016	5 March 2019	
Isabel Salud	Gipuzkoa	2	PCE/EPK	UP	UP–ECP–EM	12 July 2016	5 March 2019	
Carlos Salvador	Navarre	2	UPN	PP	Mixed	5 July 2016	5 March 2019	
Jordi Salvador	Tarragona	1	Independent	ERC–CatSí	Republican Left	18 July 2016	5 March 2019	
Luis Miguel Salvador	Granada	1	C's	C's	Citizens	5 July 2016	5 March 2019	
Ignacio Sánchez	Badajoz	2	PSOE–E	PSOE	Socialist	12 July 2016	29 June 2018	Replaced by Patricia Sierra.
Javier Sánchez	Murcia	1	Podemos	UP	UP–ECP–EM	8 July 2016	5 March 2019	
Pedro Sánchez	Madrid	1	PSOE–M	PSOE	Socialist	18 July 2016	29 October 2016	Replaced by Carlota Merchán.
Sol Sánchez	Madrid	9	IU-M	UP	UP–ECP–EM	22 January 2019	5 March 2019	Replaces Íñigo Errejón.
Tania Sánchez	Madrid	7	Podemos	UP	UP–ECP–EM	13 July 2016	5 March 2019	
Alicia Sánchez-Camacho	Barcelona	3	PP	PP	People's	6 July 2016	5 March 2019	First Secretary.
Eduardo Santos	Navarre	2	Podemos	UP	UP–ECP–EM	18 July 2016	5 March 2019	
Pedro Saura	Murcia	2	PSRM–PSOE	PSOE	Socialist	7 July 2016	22 June 2018	Replaced by Carmen Baños.
David Serrada	Salamanca	1	PSCyL–PSOE	PSOE	Socialist	8 July 2016	5 March 2019	
José Enrique Serrano	Madrid	9	PSOE–M	PSOE	Socialist	12 September 2017	5 March 2019	Replaces Eduardo Madina.
María Jesús Serrano	Córdoba	1	PSOE–A	PSOE	Socialist	11 July 2016	5 March 2019	
Marta Sibina	Girona	1	BComú	ECP	UP–ECP–EM	13 July 2016	5 March 2019	
Felipe Jesús Sicilia	Jaén	2	PSOE–A	PSOE	Socialist	7 July 2016	5 March 2019	
Patricia Sierra	Badajoz	3	PSOE–E	PSOE	Socialist	2 July 2018	5 March 2019	Replaces Ignacio Sánchez.
Rafael Simancas	Madrid	5	PSOE–M	PSOE	Socialist	6 July 2016	5 March 2019	
Ricardo Sixto	Valencia	5	EUPV	ALV	UP–ECP–EM	12 July 2016	5 March 2019	
Marta Sorlí	Castellón	1	Compromís	UP	Mixed	12 July 2016	5 March 2019	
Eloy Suárez	Zaragoza	1	PP	PP	People's	5 July 2016	5 March 2019	
María Such	Valencia	3	PSPV–PSOE	PSOE	Socialist	12 July 2016	8 August 2016	Replaced by Ciprià Ciscar.
Susana Sumelzo	Zaragoza	1	PSOE–Aragón	PSOE	Socialist	15 July 2016	5 March 2019	
Ana María Surra	Barcelona	4	Independent	ERC–CatSí	Republican Left	18 July 2016	5 March 2019	
Joan Tardà	Barcelona	2	ERC	ERC–CatSí	Republican Left	18 July 2016	5 March 2019	
Ricardo Tarno	Seville	2	PP	PP	People's	12 July 2016	5 March 2019	
Carolina Telechea	Barcelona	6	ERC	ERC–CatSí	Republican Left	12 June 2018	5 March 2019	Replaces Ester Capella.
Vicente Ten	Valencia	2	C's	C's	Citizens	12 July 2016	5 March 2019	
Ana Belén Terrón	Granada	1	Podemos	UP	UP–ECP–EM	8 July 2016	5 March 2019	
José Andrés Torres	Málaga	3	PSOE–A	PSOE	Socialist	8 July 2016	5 March 2019	
Manuel Luis Torres	Santa Cruz	4	PP	PP	People's	2 July 2018	5 March 2019	Replaces Pablo Matos.
María Torres	Jaén	4	PP	PP	People's	14 February 2017	5 March 2019	Replaces Ángeles Isac.
Manuel Torres	Córdoba	5	PP	PP	People's	21 February 2019	5 March 2019	Replaces Rafael Merino.
Ignacio Tremiño	Valladolid	2	PP	PP	People's	6 July 2016	5 March 2019	
Antonio Trevín	Asturias	2	FSA–PSOE	PSOE	Socialist	12 July 2016	31 August 2017	Replaced by Natalia González.
Victoria Begoña Tundidor	Málaga	2	PSOE–A	PSOE	Socialist	6 July 2016	5 March 2019	
Ignacio Urquizu	Teruel	1	PSOE–Aragón	PSOE	Socialist	6 July 2016	5 March 2019	
Carmen Valido	Las Palmas	2	Podemos	UP	UP–ECP–EM	8 July 2016	5 March 2019	
Silvia Valmaña	Guadalajara	1	PP	PP	People's	5 July 2016	5 March 2019	
Francisco Vañó	Toledo	4	PP	PP	People's	20 November 2018	5 March 2019	Replaces María Dolores de Cospedal.
Juan María Vazquez	Murcia	4	PP	PP	People's	6 July 2016	25 November 2016	Replaced by Javier Ruano.
Ana Belén Vázquez	Ourense	3	PP	PP	People's	5 July 2016	5 March 2019	
Soledad Amada Velasco	Albacete	2	PSCM–PSOE	PSOE	Socialist	26 June 2018	5 March 2019	Replaces Manuel Gabriel González.
Josep Vendrell	Barcelona	3	ICV	ECP	UP–ECP–EM	13 July 2016	5 March 2019	
Juan Carlos Vera	Madrid	6	PP	PP	People's	12 July 2016	5 March 2019	
Noelia Vera	Cádiz	1	Podemos	UP	UP–ECP–EM	6 July 2016	5 March 2019	
Aina Vidal	Barcelona	9	ICV	ECP	UP–ECP–EM	13 July 2016	5 March 2019	
Raimundo Viejo	Barcelona	5	Podemos	ECP	UP–ECP–EM	13 July 2016	5 March 2019	
Miguel Vila	Burgos	1	Podemos	UP	UP–ECP–EM	12 July 2016	5 March 2019	
Celia Villalobos	Málaga	2	PP	PP	People's	5 July 2016	5 March 2019	
José Manuel Villegas	Barcelona	4	C's	C's	Citizens	7 July 2016	5 March 2019	
Miguel Ángel Viso	Ourense	1	PP	PP	People's	7 July 2016	5 March 2019	
Jordi Xuclà	Girona	1	CDC	CDC	Mixed	5 July 2016	5 March 2019	
Juan Pedro Yllanes	Balearic Islands	2	Independent	UP-MES	UP–ECP–EM	7 July 2016	5 March 2019	
José Zaragoza	Barcelona	4	PSC	PSOE	Socialist	13 July 2016	5 March 2019	
Juan Ignacio Zoido	Seville	1	PP	PP	People's	12 July 2016	5 March 2019	
Ana María Zurita	Santa Cruz	1	PP	PP	People's	6 July 2016	5 March 2019	
