= Gloria Elizo =

Spanish lawyer

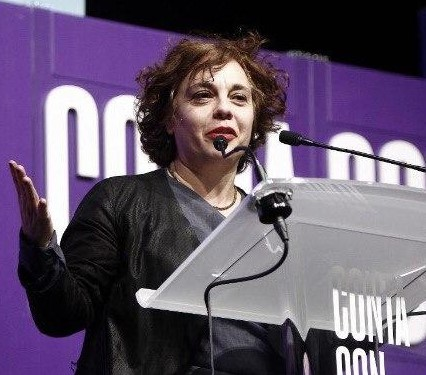

3rd Vice President of the Spanish Congress of Deputies
- Incumbent
- Assumed office 3 December 2019
- President: Meritxell Batet
- Preceded by: Ana Pastor Julián
- In office 13 January 2016 – 19 July 2016
- President: Patxi López
- Preceded by: Dolors Montserrat
- Succeeded by: Rosa Romero

1st Vice President of the Spanish Congress of Deputies
- In office 21 May 2019 – 3 December 2019
- President: Meritxell Batet
- Preceded by: Ignacio Prendes
- Succeeded by: Alfonso Rodríguez Gómez de Celis

Secretary of Institutional Action of We Can
- Incumbent
- Assumed office 18 February 2017
- Preceded by: Auxiliadora Honorato

4th Vice President of the Spanish Congress of Deputies
- In office 19 July 2016 – 21 May 2019
- President: Ana Pastor
- Preceded by: Rosa Romero
- Succeeded by: Ignacio Prendes

Member of the Spanish Congress of Deputies from Madrid
- Incumbent
- Assumed office 13 January 2016

Personal details
- Born: María Gloria Elizo Serrano; 11 December 1966 (age 59) Madrid, Spain
- Party: We Can
- Education: Complutense University of Madrid
- Occupation: Lawyer

María Gloria Elizo Serrano (born 11 December 1966) is a Spanish lawyer, politician of Podemos and the third vice president of the Congress of Deputies. Since 18 February 2017 she has been part of the national executive of We Can in different responsibilities and since 8 June 2019 as Secretary of Democratic Regeneration and Policies against Corruption.

== Biography ==
Graduated in Law from the Complutense University of Madrid, she began working as a lawyer specializing in Criminal and Civil Law. Partner for twelve years of a law firm, she was appointed a substitute judge in the court of Úbeda (Jaén) in 2002.

With the appearance of We Can, she took over his legal representation. As such, she was in charge of the lawsuits against Esperanza Aguirre and Eduardo Inda for accusing Pablo Iglesias of collaborating with Basque Homeland and Liberty and We Can of receiving financing from Venezuela. She also promoted, together with the lawyer Jaume Asens and the former prosecutor Carlos Jiménez Villarejo, the complaints against Jordi Pujol and Marta Ferrusola and collaborated in the contact that the party maintained with different professional groups.

The Podemos legal team received seven criminal complaints related to its financing. Once they were archived, the accusation appeared first against Clean Hands and then against journalist Eduardo Inda in the complaint against Commissioner José Manuel Villarejo for the wiretapping of the National Intelligence Center of the so-called "patriotic police" that allegedly manufactured false reports against opponents such as Pablo Iglesias or Xavier Trias.

In November 2014, together with Carlos Jimenez Villarejo, she presented the anti-corruption document that was approved in the “Yes We Can” constituent assembly of Podemos. At the end of the meeting, she was elected president of the Democratic Guarantees Commission of Podemos with 86.12% of the votes.

She actively participated in the 2015 general election, coordinating the anti-corruption and judiciary program, on the reform of which she has published several documents. After the primaries, she was presented as the head of the list of the candidacy of We Can to the Congress of Deputies for the Toledo district. She was the only Podemos candidate to win a seat in Castilla–La Mancha.

On 13 January 2016, the date on which the lower house was constituted, she was elected third vice president of Congress with the support of 71 deputies.

In the general election of June 26, she revalidated the seat for Toledo, obtaining Teresa Arévalo for Albacete a second seat for the United We Can Coalition in Castilla–La Mancha. On 19 July 2016 she was elected fourth vice president of the Congress of Deputies. In the general election of 28 April, she was again elected deputy, this time of the electoral district of Madrid, occupying fourth place on the list of the United We Can coalition in that district. On 21 May she was elected by Congress as First Vice President.

Since 18 February 2017 she has been a member of the national executive of Podemos, first as Secretary of Institutional Action and as of 8 June 2019 as Secretary of Democratic Regeneration and Policies against Corruption.

She is the mother of two children.
