= Sempere (surname) =

Sempere is a surname. Notable people with the surname include:

- África Sempere (born 1992), Spanish handballer
- César Sempere (born 1984), Spanish rugby union player
- Eusebio Sempere (1923–1985), Spanish sculptor, painter and graphic artist
- Eva García Sempere (born 1976), Spanish politician
- José Manuel Sempere (born 1958), Spanish footballer
