= Alexandra Fernández =

Alexandra Fernández may refer to:

- Alexandra Fernández Gómez (born 1988), Spanish politician, member of the 12th Congress of Deputies
- Alexandra Fernández Navarro, Puerto Rican lawyer and academic administrator
