= Kissy Chandiramani =

Spanish politician

Kissy Chandiramani Ramesh (born 8 March 1979) is a Spanish politician from Ceuta. A member of the Ceuta's autonomous government, she briefly served as MP in the Congress of Deputies in 2019 as part of the People's Party (PP) parliamentary group.

== Biography ==
Born in Ceuta on 8 March 1979, she belongs to the Ceuta's Sindhi Hindu community. She earned a licentiate degree in law from Universidad CEU San Pablo and acquired another degree in EU law from Sorbonne. She worked as clerk in a law firm and as salesperson in a BBVA office. After running 12th in the People's Party (PP) list for the 2003 Ceuta local election, she became a member of the Assembly of Ceuta in 2003. She became minister of Economy, Finance and Public Function of the autonomous government of Ceuta in 2017. Following the appointment of Juan Bravo Baena as Minister of Economy of the Regional Government of Andalusia, she was sworn in as Member of the Congress of Deputies in representation of Ceuta on 12 February 2019, covering Bravo's vacant seat. She was then referred as the "first member of the Congress of Deputies of Hindu origin". She took office again as minister of Economy, Finance and Public Function of the autonomous government of Ceuta in March 2020.
