= María Such =

Spanish politician (born 1990)

Member of the Congress of Deputies
- In office 13 January 2016 – 8 August 2016
- Succeeded by: Ciprià Ciscar
- Constituency: Valencia

Personal details
- Born: 23 June 1990 (age 35)
- Party: Spanish Socialist Workers' Party (since 2004)

María Such Palomares (born 23 June 1990) is a Spanish politician. From January to August 2016, she was a member of the Congress of Deputies. She took office as the youngest member of the Congress.
