= Dolors Montserrat =

Spanish lawyer and politician

The Most Excellent Dolors Montserrat MEP OCIII
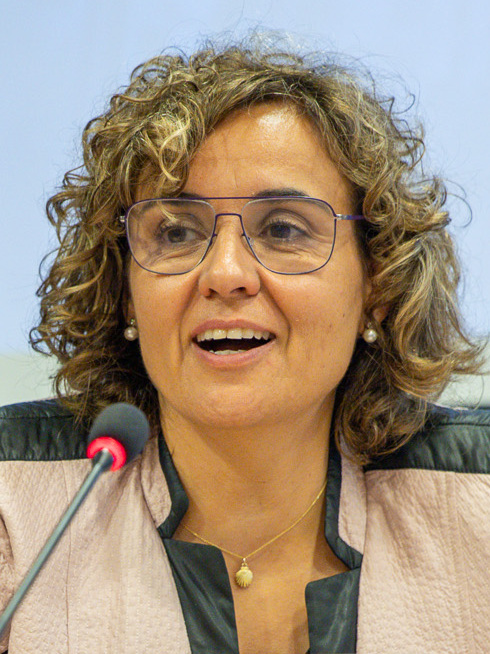
- Dolors Montserrat in 2025

Vice-Chair of the European People's Party in the European Parliament
- Incumbent
- Assumed office 19 June 2024
- Chair: Manfred Weber
- Serving alongside: François-Xavier Bellamy; Andrzej Halicki; Jeroen Lenaers; Siegfried Mureșan; Lídia Pereira; Massimiliano Salini; Tomas Tobé; Romana Tomc; Željana Zovko
- Preceded by: See list: Arnaud Danjean; Frances Fitzgerald; Rasa Juknevičienė; Jeroen Lenaers; Vangelis Meimarakis; Dolors Montserrat; Siegfried Mureşan; Jan Olbrycht; Željana Zovko; Lídia Pereira

Member of the European Parliament for Spain
- Incumbent
- Assumed office 2 July 2019

Minister of Health, Social Services and Equality
- In office 4 November 2016 – 1 June 2018
- Monarch: Felipe VI
- Prime Minister: Mariano Rajoy
- Preceded by: Alfonso Alonso
- Succeeded by: Carmen Montón

Third Vice President of the Congress
- In office 13 December 2011 – 13 January 2016
- President: Jesús Posada
- Preceded by: Jorge Fernández Díaz
- Succeeded by: Gloria Elizo

Member of the Congress of Deputies
- In office 1 March 2008 – 21 May 2019
- Constituency: Barcelona

Personal details
- Born: Dolors Montserrat i Montserrat; 18 September 1973 (age 53) Sant Sadurní d'Anoia, Spain
- Party: People's Party
- Education: Abat Oliba CEU University; ESADE; University of Barcelona

Dolors Montserrat i Montserrat (Catalan pronunciation: [duˈloz munsəˈrat]; born 18 September 1973) is a Spanish lawyer and politician who serves as Member of the European Parliament. Previously, she served as Minister of Health, Social Services and Equality of Spain from 2016 to 2018, when a vote of no-confidence against Mariano Rajoy ousted the government.

In addition, Montserrat has also been Member of the Congress of Deputies in the Cortes Generales between 2008 and 2019 by Barcelona. She is the daughter of the businesswoman, and also politician of the People's Party, Dolors Montserrat i Culleré.

During the 2025 EPP congress in Valencia, she was elected as the First female Secretary-general of the European People's Party

== Early life and education ==
Montserrat studied in her hometown, although she finished her pre-university studies in the United States. She later obtained a law degree from the Abat Oliva CEU University in Barcelona and she obtained a master's degree from the School of Law Practice of the Bar Association of Barcelona and since 1997 she has specialized in urban, real estate and environmental law. She also carried out a Community Agrarian Law Program taught by the University of Ferrara (Italy), a postgraduate degree in Urban and Real Estate Law from Pompeu Fabra University, a postgraduate course in Mediation and Negotiation from the University of Barcelona, a Real Estate Law program and urban planning provided by ESADE and a program of management of real estate companies taught by IESE.

== Political career ==
=== Career in national politics ===
Montserrat has been regent and spokesperson of the People's Party in Sant Sadurní d'Anoia City Council since 2007, member of the executive committee of the PP of Catalonia and deputy for the province of Barcelona to the Spanish general election of 2008 and 2011. In the 10th legislature occupied, between 2011 and 2016, the third vice presidency of the Congress of the Deputies.

In May 2012, Montserrat acceded to the Deputy Secretariat for Organization and Social Action of the PP of Catalonia, in the remodeling of the leadership resulting from its 13th Congress.

Montserrat has been president of the Board of Young Cofrades of Cava of Sant Sadurní d'Anoia.

On 4 November 2016, Montserrat swore her office as Minister of Health, Social Services and Equality in the government of Mariano Rajoy. In 2017, she led the Spanish government's unsuccessful campaign to host the European Medicines Agency (EMA) in Barcelona. She was rejected by the Congress of Deputies for her mismanagement of the Ministry on 29 May 2018. On 26 July 2018, was named spokesperson of the PP parliamentary group after Rajoy Government was ousted and Pablo Casado was elected president of the party.

=== Member of the European Parliament ===
For the 2019 European Parliament election Montserrat was the head candidate for Spain with the People's Party. As Member of the European Parliament, she serves as the chair of the Committee on Petitions and member of the Committee on the Environment, Public Health and Food Safety. In this capacity, she is the Parliament's rapporteur on the EU's pharmaceutical strategy. She later also joined the Special Committee on Beating Cancer (2020) and the Special Committee on the COVID-19 pandemic (2022). Since 2021, she has been part of the Parliament's delegation to the Conference on the Future of Europe.

In addition to her committee assignments, Montserrat is part of the MEPs Against Cancer group and the European Parliament Intergroup on Children's Rights.

In March 2024, Montserrat was one of twenty MEPs to be given a "Rising Star" award at The Parliament Magazine's annual MEP Awards

== Political positions ==
Montserrat is an outspoken opponent of the Catalan independence movement.
