= Silvia Heredia =

Spanish politician (born 1979)

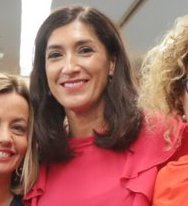
- Heredia in 2017

Member of the Congress of Deputies
- In office 19 July 2016 – 5 March 2019
- Constituency: Seville
- In office 13 December 2011 – 27 October 2015
- Constituency: Seville

Personal details
- Born: 24 August 1979 (age 46)
- Party: People's Party

Silvia Heredia Martín (born 24 August 1979) is a Spanish politician serving as mayor of Écija since 2023. From 2022 to 2023, she was a member of the Parliament of Andalusia. She was a member of the Congress of Deputies from 2011 to 2015 and from 2016 to 2019.
