= Ricardo Cortés Lastra =

Spanish politician

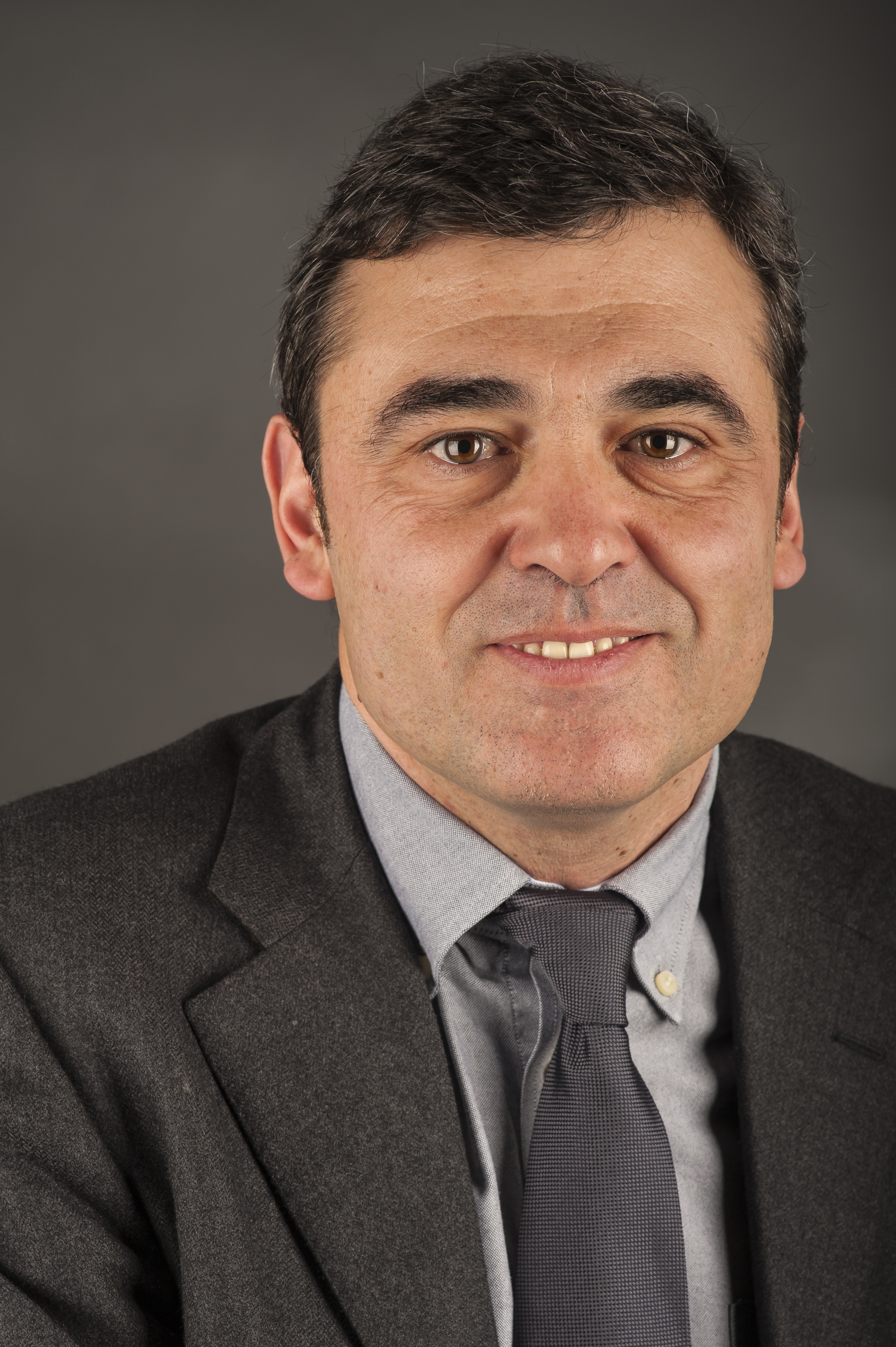

Member of the European Parliament
- In office 14 July 2009 – 30 June 2014
- Constituency: Spain

Personal details
- Born: 23 September 1969 (age 56) Castro Urdiales, Cantabria, Spain
- Party: Spanish Socialist Workers Party
- Occupation: Politician

Ricardo Cortés Lastra, is a Spanish politician. He served as a Member of the European Parliament, representing Spain for the Spanish Socialist Workers Party from 2009 to 2014.

== Parliamentary service ==
He served as Chair of the Delegation to the EU-Mexico Joint Parliamentary Committee from 2010 to 2014. He served as Vice-Chair of the Delegation to the Euro-Latin American Parliamentary Assembly from 2009 to 2010.
