= Mar Cotelo =

Spanish politician (born 1973)

Member of the Senate
- Incumbent
- Assumed office 15 September 2023
- Appointed by: Parliament of La Rioja

Member of the Congress of Deputies
- In office 19 July 2016 – 5 March 2019
- Constituency: La Rioja

Personal details
- Born: 31 March 1973 (age 53)
- Party: People's Party

Mar Cotelo Balmaseda (born 31 March 1973) is a Spanish politician serving as a member of the Senate since 2023. From 2016 to 2019, she was a member of the Congress of Deputies.
