= Víctor Píriz (politician) =

Spanish politician (born 1975)

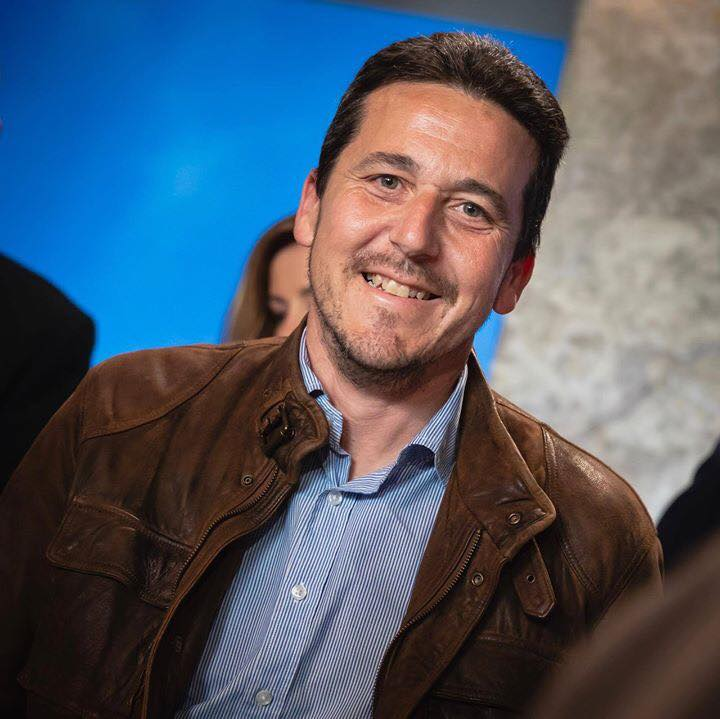
- Píriz in 2019

Member of the Congress of Deputies
- In office 29 August 2016 – 23 July 2023
- Constituency: Badajoz

Personal details
- Born: 22 July 1975 (age 50)
- Party: People's Party

Víctor Valentín Píriz Maya (born 22 July 1975) is a Spanish politician. From 2016 to 2023, he was a member of the Congress of Deputies. From 2023 to 2025, he served as secretary general of economy, business and trade of Extremadura.
