= Domingo Lorenzo Rodríguez =

Spanish politician

Domingo Lorenzo Rodríguez is a Spanish politician. He was elected to the Congress of Deputies in the December 20, 2015 general election, standing as a Ciudadanos (C's) candidate in Castellón province.

On July 22, 2015 he was named alternate senator.

Rodríguez holds a master's degree in Law. He formed part of the Regional Police Brigade of Madrid.
