= María Torres (politician) =

Spanish politician (born 1981)

Member of the Congress of Deputies
- Incumbent
- Assumed office 10 January 2024
- Preceded by: María Luisa Del Moral Leal
- Constituency: Jaén
- In office 14 February 2017 – 5 March 2019
- Preceded by: Ángeles Isac García
- Constituency: Jaén

Personal details
- Born: 22 August 1981 (age 45)
- Party: People's Party

María Torres Tejada (born 22 August 1981) is a Spanish politician. She has been a member of the Congress of Deputies since 2024, having previously served from 2017 to 2019. She has been a city councillor of Bailén since 2007.
