= Herick Campos =

Spanish politician (born 1976)

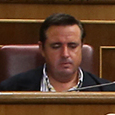
- Campos in 2018

Member of the Congress of Deputies
- In office 16 November 2017 – 21 May 2019
- Preceded by: Julián López Milla
- Constituency: Alicante
- In office 2 April 2004 – 19 July 2016
- Constituency: Alicante

Personal details
- Born: 12 March 1976 (age 50)
- Party: Spanish Socialist Workers' Party

Herick Manuel Campos Arteseros (born 12 March 1976) is a Spanish politician. He was a member of the Congress of Deputies from 2004 to 2016 and from 2017 to 2019. From 2000 to 2007, he served as secretary general of the Socialist Youth of Spain.
