= Marcelo Expósito =

Spanish footballer

Personal information
- Full name: Marcelo Expósito Jiménez
- Date of birth: 15 February 2003 (age 23)
- Place of birth: Córdoba, Spain
- Height: 1.81 m (5 ft 11 in)
- Position: Midfielder

Team information
- Current team: Burgos
- Number: 33

Youth career
- 2009–2010: Villarrubia
- 2010–2016: Córdoba
- 2016–2017: Sevilla
- 2017–2018: Altair
- 2018–2022: Sevilla

Senior career*
Years	Team	Apps	(Gls)
2022–2024	Sevilla C	20	(1)
2024–2025	Burgos B	8	(0)
2024–	Burgos	42	(2)
- * Club domestic league appearances and goals as of 6 June 2026

Marcelo Expósito Jiménez (born 15 February 2003) is a Spanish footballer who plays as a midfielder for Burgos CF.

== Career ==
Born in Córdoba, Andalusia, Expósito represented Villarrubia CF, Córdoba CF and Sevilla FC as a youth. He made his senior debut with the latter's C-team on 6 March 2022, coming on as a half-time substitute in a 1–0 Tercera División RFEF home win over UD Tomares.

On 1 April 2022, Expósito renewed his contract with the Nervionenses until 2025. However, he struggled with injuries in the following years, which hampered his development.

On 26 July 2024, Expósito moved to Burgos CF and was initially assigned to the reserves also in the fifth division. He made his first team debut on 30 October, starting in a 5–2 away win over CD Móstoles URJC, for the season's Copa del Rey.

Expósito made his professional debut on 23 November 2024, replacing Iván Morante in a 1–0 Segunda División home win over SD Eibar. He scored his first professional goal the following 21 March, netting the opener in a 3–1 home win over UD Almería.
