= Francisco Bernabé =

Spanish politician (born 1970)

Member of the Senate
- Incumbent
- Assumed office 10 November 2019
- Constituency: Murcia
- In office 19 July 2018 – 19 July 2019
- Appointed by: Regional Assembly of Murcia

Member of the Congress of Deputies
- In office 19 July 2016 – 9 November 2017
- Succeeded by: Dolores Bolarín
- Constituency: Murcia

Personal details
- Born: 3 April 1970 (age 56)
- Party: People's Party

Francisco Martín Bernabé Pérez (born 3 April 1970) is a Spanish politician. He has been a member of the Senate since 2019, having previously served from 2018 to 2019. From 2016 to 2017, he was a member of the Congress of Deputies. From 2007 to 2014, he served as mayor of La Unión.
