= Tomás Burgos Gallego =

Spanish politician (born 1962)

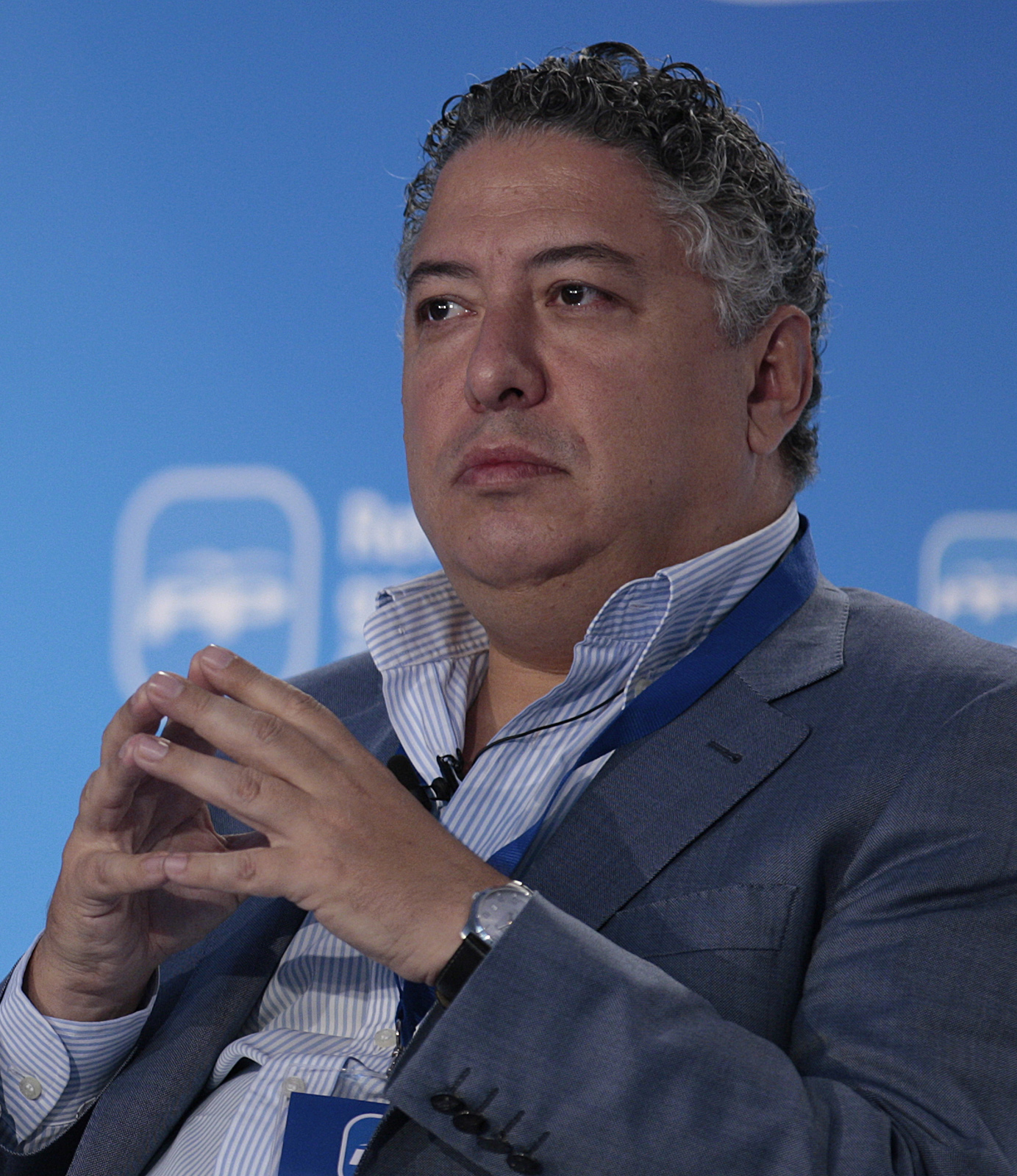
In 2012

Tomás Burgos Gallego (Valladolid, 21 April 1962) is a Spanish politician who belongs to the People's Party (PP).

Single, Burgos served as a regional procurator in the Cortes of Castile and León from 1987 to 1993. In the early 1990s he served as Chairman of Nuevas Generaciones, the youth wing of the PP and at the 1993 General Election he was elected to the Spanish Congress of Deputies representing Valladolid Province. He was re-elected at the subsequent elections in 1996, 2000, 2004 and 2008. For the 2008 election he was placed second on the PP list in a district where the PP and predecessors had won at least two seats since 1982, effectively guaranteeing him a seat.

In Congress he has served as Vice-President of the Commission on Employment and Social Security.

From 2011 to 2018 he served as Secretary of State for Social Security and, since 2019, he has been serving in different positions in the Regional Government of Andalusia under Juanma Moreno.
