= Tristana Moraleja =

Spanish politician (born 1971)

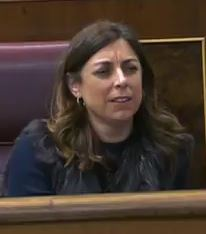
- Moraleja in 2018

Member of the Congress of Deputies
- Incumbent
- Assumed office 14 July 2016
- Constituency: A Coruña
- In office 5 December 2011 – 27 October 2015
- Constituency: A Coruña

Personal details
- Born: 17 August 1971 (age 55)
- Party: People's Party

Tristana María Moraleja Gómez (born 17 August 1971) is a Spanish politician. She has been a member of the Congress of Deputies since 2016, having previously served from 2011 to 2015. From 2015 to 2021, she was a municipal councillor of Oleiros.
