= Joan Margall =

Spanish politician (born 1975)

Joan Margall MP
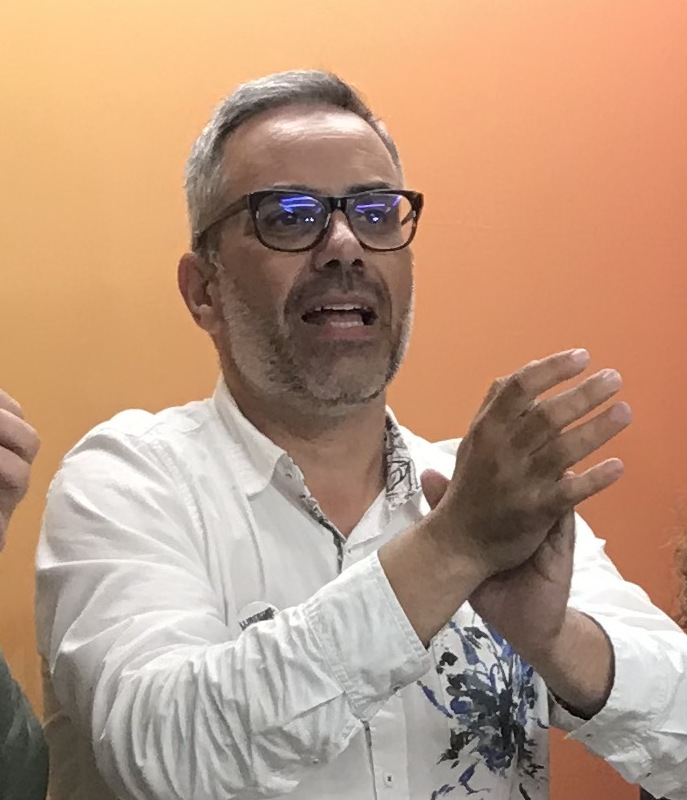
- Margall in April 2019

Member of the Congress of Deputies
- Incumbent
- Assumed office 12 June 2018
- Preceded by: Teresa Jordà
- Constituency: Girona

Mayor of Torroella de Montgrí
- In office 2007–2009
- Preceded by: Carles Negre
- Succeeded by: Josep Maria Rufí

Member of Torroella de Montgrí Municipal Council
- In office 2003–2011

Personal details
- Born: Joan Margall i Sastre; 2 November 1975 (age 50) Torroella de Montgrí, Catalonia, Spain
- Citizenship: Spanish
- Party: Republican Left of Catalonia
- Other political affiliations: Republican Left of Catalonia–Sovereigntists
- Education: University of Girona

Joan Margall i Sastre (born 2 November 1975) is a Spanish politician from Catalonia who serves as a Member of the Congress of Deputies of Spain.

== Early life ==
Margall was born on 2 November 1975 in Torroella de Montgrí, Catalonia. He has a degree in history from the University of Girona.

== Career ==
Margall is a business consultant. He is a member of the Catalan National Assembly (ANC). He joined the Republican Left of Catalonia (ERC) in 2017.

At the 1999 local elections Margall was placed 13th on the Unitat i Progrés Municipal (UPM) electoral alliance's list of candidates in Torroella de Montgrí but the alliance only managed to win five seats in the municipality and as a result he failed to get elected. He contested the 2003 local elections as a UPM candidate in Torroella de Montgrí and was elected. He was re-elected at the 2007 local elections. After the election ERC-AM formed an administration with Republican Left of Catalonia-Acord Municipal (ERC-AM) with Margall serving as mayor from 2007 to 2009 and deputy mayor from 2009 to 2011. At the 2011 local elections Margall was placed 13th on the UPM-PM's list of candidates in Torroella de Montgrí but the alliance only managed to win three seats in the municipality and as a result he failed to get re-elected. Margall was vice-president of Baix Empordà County Council from 2003 to 2007.

At the 2015 general election Margall was placed third on the Republican Left of Catalonia–Catalonia Yes (ERC–CatSí) electoral alliance's list of candidates in the Province of Girona but the alliance only managed to win two seats in the province and as a result he failed to get elected. At the 2016 general election he was placed third on ERC–CatSí's list of candidates in the Province of Girona but the alliance only managed to win two seats in the province and as a result he failed to get elected. However, in June 2018, he was appointed to the Congress of Deputies following the resignation of Teresa Jordà. He was re-elected at the 2019 general election.

== Personal life ==
Margall is married and has two children - Maura and Maiol.

== Electoral history ==
Electoral history of Joan Margall
Election	Constituency	Party	Alliance	No.	Result
1999 local	Torroella de Montgrí		Unitat i Progrés Municipal	13	Not elected
2003 local	Torroella de Montgrí		Unitat i Progrés Municipal	1	Elected
2007 local	Torroella de Montgrí		Unitat i Progrés Municipal-Progrés Municipal	1	Elected
2011 local	Torroella de Montgrí		Unitat i Progrés Municipal-Progrés Municipal	13	Not elected
2015 general	Province of Girona	Independent	Republican Left of Catalonia–Catalonia Yes	3	Not elected
2016 general	Province of Girona	Independent	Republican Left of Catalonia–Catalonia Yes	3	Not elected
2019 general	Province of Girona	Republican Left of Catalonia	Republican Left of Catalonia–Sovereigntists	2	Elected
