= Alicia Ramos =

Spanish singer

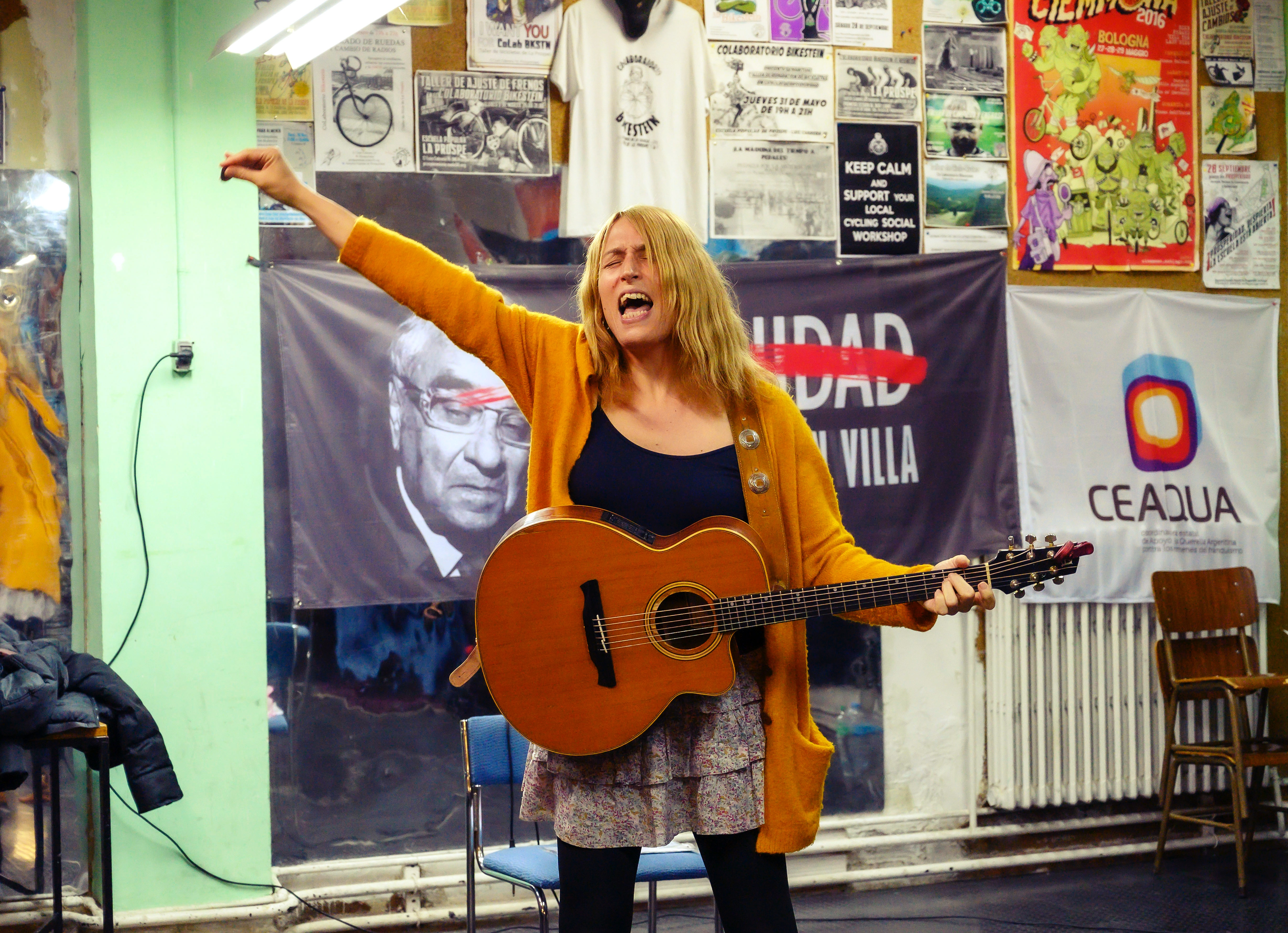
- Born: Alicia Ramos Triano; 13 September 1969 (age 57); Güímar. Spain
- Occupations: Singer and writer

Alicia Ramos Triano, known professionally as Alicia Ramos (Güímar, September 13, 1969), is a Spanish LGBT singer-songwriter, columnist, and writer.

== Early life ==
She was born in the Tenerife municipality of Güimar, in the Canary Islands. Academically, she has a degree in geography and history, but music has interested her since she was very young. She began to play Canarian folklore at the age of nine, and later she studied piano at the Conservatory.

She made her first compositions at the age of fifteen or sixteen. She claims to have forged her musical taste listening to Deep Purple, the bands ofe Ritchie Blackmore, Lucinda Williams, Shooter Jennings, Sheryl Crow or John Mayer in his last stages, but also other voices such as John Denver, Silvio Rodríguez, the figures of the Novísima Trova Cubana Frank Delgado and Carlos Varela, or singers like Fito Páez and Andrés Calamaro. Her music is a mix of styles, but country rock is the most common one. Her lyrics are always mean and funny.

== Career ==
As a result of participating in an open mic whose proposal was to make a song about a current issue every week, she composed two of her best known songs, "Mi Amante Urdangarín" and "Muérete tú dedicated" to Christine Lagarde, director of the International Monetary Fund, after she asked in 2012 for a lowering of pensions because of "the risk of people living longer than expected".

In 2014, her song "Y las flores" was the soundtrack of the documentary directed by Fernando Olmeda, El viaje de Carla, about the life of the politician and LGBT rights activist Carla Antonelli, a fellow countryman of Ramos. In August 2015, she released her first album, Ganas de quemar cosas, with ten songs that, according to herself, have never failed her. She was able to do so because the sound technician of a hall where she had performed offered to record it in her spare time without charging her. Lumpenprekariät, her second album, came out in September 2018. The name of the album is a play on the Marxist term lumpenproletariado.

With her band Brútiful or solo, she performs on stages in bars, theaters, festivals, self-managed social centers, cultural centers, or in the street. Sometimes, her alter ego, Alicia Bouquet, comes out on stage and sings English love and heartbreak songs.

She is part of the Arte Muhé collective, a multidisciplinary artistic project whose aim is to make women artists visible.

Although she has stated that music is her life, Ramos is also the author of a novel titled El último vándalo (que yo sepa) and frequently writes for media outlets such as Píkara Magazine, Diario Público, ElDiario.es or El Salto. In March 2020, she took over a column in CTXT, which is called the same as her first album, Ganas de quemar cosas.

She has never defined herself as an activist, but the truth is that she has collaborated for four years with the association of families of transsexual minors, Chrysallis and has been part of the cast of the short film Transparente, produced by the association.

== Acknowledgments ==
She has received awards from entities that fight for the rights of LGBT people:

- In 2016, she was awarded for being visible in her artistic career in the V edition of the Adriano Antinoo Equality Awards, which are given by the association of the same name in collaboration with the Cajasol Foundation to recognize the trajectory of individuals and entities in their fight for LGBT equality.
- In 2018, the State Federation of Lesbians, Gays, Trans and Bisexuals awarded Ramos one of its pens at the XII edition of the annual Plumas y Látigos awards for her visibility and for showing through her music another way of being an activist, transmitting a critical message towards patriarchy and cisexism.
- In 2019, the COGAM collective presented him with the Bandera a la Militancia for her contribution to LGTBI activism.

Literary awards

- In 2019, her novel El último vándalo won the Benito Pérez Armas Award in its 35th edition. This prize is the longest-running literary award in the Canary Islands and is convened annually by Caja Canarias.
