= Sol Sánchez =

Spanish politician

Sol Sánchez Maroto
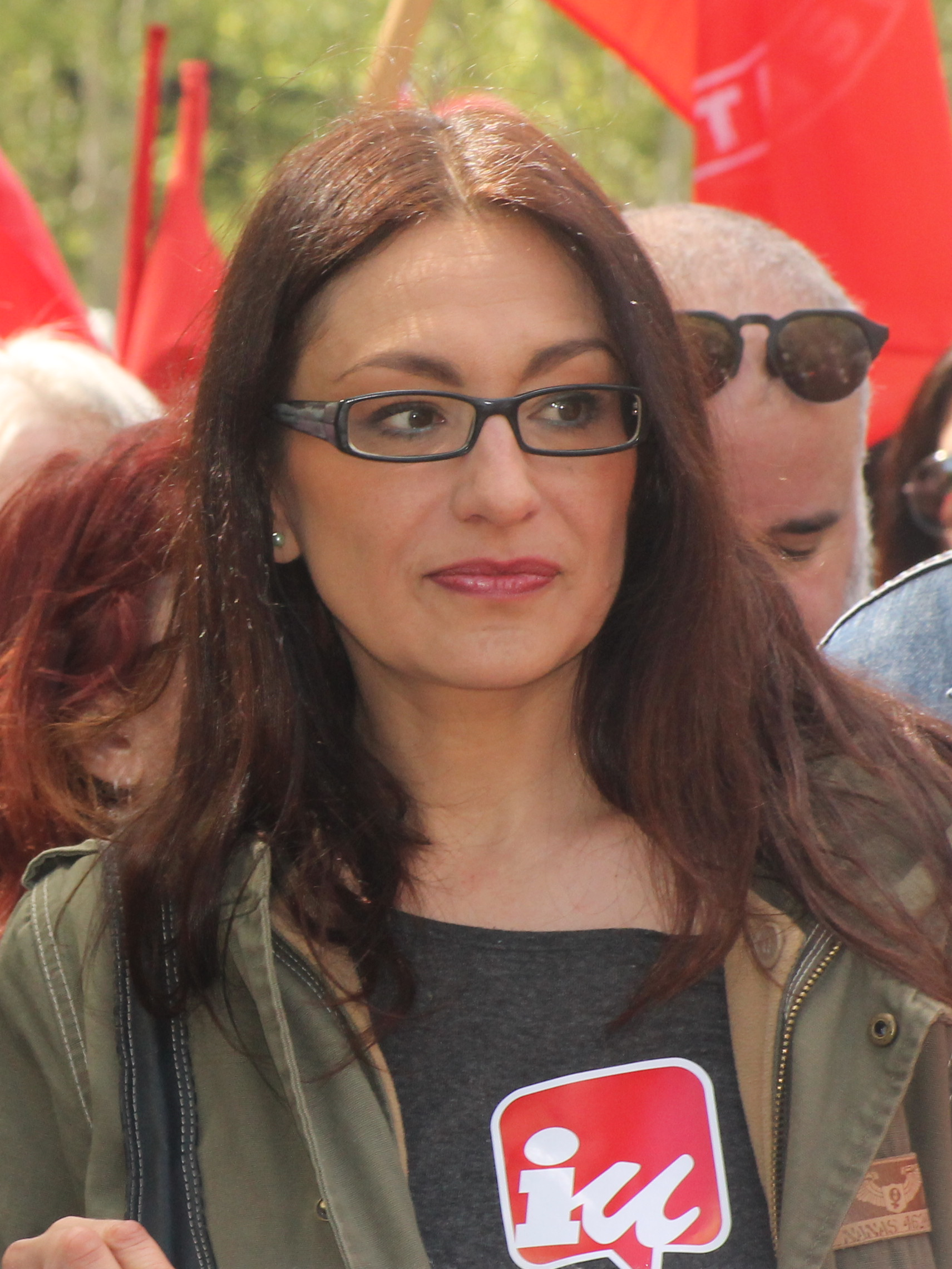

Member of the Cortes Generales
- In office 7 January 2016 – 3 May 2016

Member of the Cortes Generales
- In office 22 January 2019 – 5 March 2019

Personal details
- Born: 1 April 1970 (age 56)
- Occupation: Politician

Sol Sánchez Maroto is a Spanish politician. She was a member of the Cortes Generales twice, representing the Madrid constituency for the United Left Party and Unidas Podemos in 2016 and 2019.

== Life and career ==
Sánchez was born on 1 April 1970. She holds degrees in political science, sociology, and anthropology. She has worked as a banking and financial consultant. She was elected a federal member of parliament for the Constituency of Madrid in 2016, on the list of the Popular Unity party. In 2017 she was selected as the co-spokesperson of United Left–Madrid. Sánchez was placed ninth on the party list in the general elections of 2016 and was not re-elected since the party only won eight seats, but she was elected once again to the Spanish parliament in 2019.
