= Antonio Quintana =

Colombian weightlifter

Personal information
- Nationality: Colombian
- Born: 9 January 1962 (age 64)

Sport
- Sport: Weightlifting

Antonio Quintana (born 9 January 1962) is a Colombian weightlifter. He competed in the men's flyweight event at the 1984 Summer Olympics.
