= Natalia González =

Chilean politician

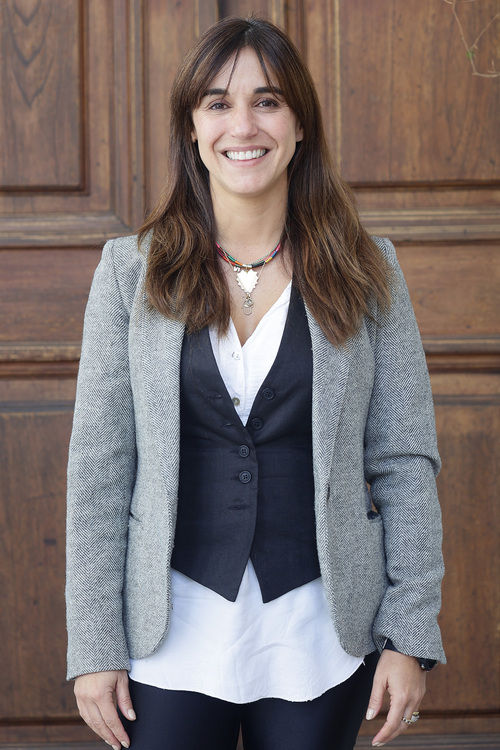

Expert Commissioner for the Constitutional Council
- In office 6 March 2023 – 7 November 2023

Personal details
- Born: 24 February 1977 (age 49) Santiago, Chile
- Education: Pontifical Catholic University of Chile (LL.B); University of Chicago (LL.M)
- Occupation: Attorney
- Profession: Lawyer

Natalia Andrea González Bañados (born 24 February 1977) is a Chilean attorney.

On January 23, 2023, she was appointed by the Senate as a member of the Expert Commission, tasked with drafting a constitutional text towards the 2023 Chilean constitutional referendum.

== Biography ==
=== Background ===
Born in Santiago, Chile, on February 26, 1977, she completed her higher education at the Pontifical Catholic University of Chile, where she earned a Bachelor's degree in Law, which allowed her to qualify as a lawyer from the Chilean Supreme Court.

González subsequently earned a Master of Laws (LL.M) from the University of Chicago, where she was a Fulbright and CONICYT scholar from 2008 to 2009.

=== Professional career ===
From 2002 to 2006, she worked as an associate attorney at the Chilean law firm Carey. She subsequently served as an advisor to the ministries of Energy (2007–2008) and Finance (2010–2012).

In early 2010s, González worked as an attorney at the Center for Studies on Liberty and Development (LyD) (2010–2012). Later, in 2017, she was signed as an attorney for the newspaper El Mercurio.

From 2016 to 2020, she directed the Center for Regulatory and Business Law at the Universidad del Desarrollo. In 2018, she rejoined the LyD as deputy director, a position she left in 2020 after being elected to the Transparency Council.

In 2020s, she became a regular panelist on several T13 Radio programs.
