= Pedro Acedo =

Spanish politician (born 1955)

Pedro Acedo Penco (born 1 February 1955 in Hornachos) is a Spanish politician. He is the former Mayor of Mérida and legislator of the 12th Cortes Generales in the senate of Spain.
