= Teresa Jordà =

Spanish politician (born 1972)

Teresa Jordà MP
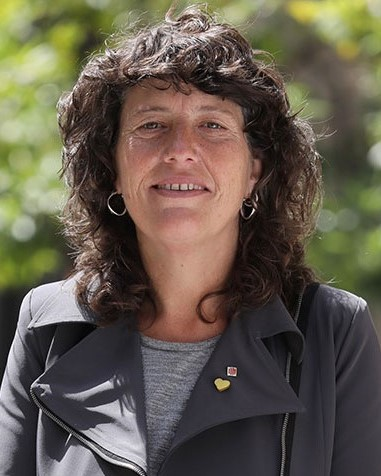
- Official portrait, 2021

Minister of Climate Action, Food and Rural Agenda of Catalonia
- In office 26 May 2021 – 12 June 2023
- President: Pere Aragonès
- Preceded by: Herself (as Minister of Agriculture, Livestock, Fisheries and Food)
- Succeeded by: David Mascort

Minister of Agriculture, Livestock, Fisheries and Food of Catalonia
- In office 2 June 2018 – 26 May 2021
- President: Quim Torra
- Preceded by: Meritxell Serret (Direct rule from 27 October 2017)

Member of the Congress of Deputies
- In office 5 December 2011 – 1 June 2018
- Succeeded by: Joan Margall
- Constituency: Girona

Mayor of Ripoll
- In office 14 June 2003 – 21 May 2011
- Preceded by: Eudald Casadesús i Barceló
- Succeeded by: Jordi Munell i Garcia

Member of the Municipality Council of Ripoll
- In office 1999–2017

Member of the Congress of Deputies
- Incumbent
- Assumed office 17 August 2023
- Constituency: Barcelona

Personal details
- Born: Maria Teresa Jordà i Roura; 19 June 1972 (age 54) Ripoll, Catalonia, Spain
- Citizenship: Spanish
- Party: Republican Left of Catalonia
- Other political affiliations: Republican Left of Catalonia–Catalonia Yes
- Education: Autonomous University of Barcelona

Maria Teresa Jordà i Roura (Catalan pronunciation: [təˈɾɛzə ʒuɾˈða]; born 19 June 1972) is a Spanish politician from Catalonia who served as Minister of Climate Action, Food and Rural Agenda and Minister of Agriculture, Livestock, Fisheries and Food of Catalonia.

She was previously the Minister of Agriculture, Livestock, Fisheries and Food of Catalonia, member of the Congress of Deputies and mayor of Ripoll, a municipality in north-east Spain.

== Early life ==
Jordà was born on 19 June 1972 in Ripoll, Catalonia. She has a degree in modern and contemporary history from the Autonomous University of Barcelona.

== Career ==
Jordà contested the 1999 local elections as a Republican Left of Catalonia-Acord Municipal (ERC-AM) electoral alliance candidate in Ripoll and was elected. She was re-elected at the 2003 local elections. At the 2003 election ERC-AM formed a pact with the Socialists' Party of Catalonia-Municipal Progress and Junts per Ripoll-Initiative for Catalonia Greens-Agreement for Municipal Progress alliances to gain control of the municipality from Convergence and Union (Ciu) and Jordà became mayor of Ripoll. She was re-elected at the 2007 and 2011 local elections. ERC-AM lost control of the municipality to CiU in 2011 and Jordà ceased being mayor. She was re-elected at the 2015 local elections.

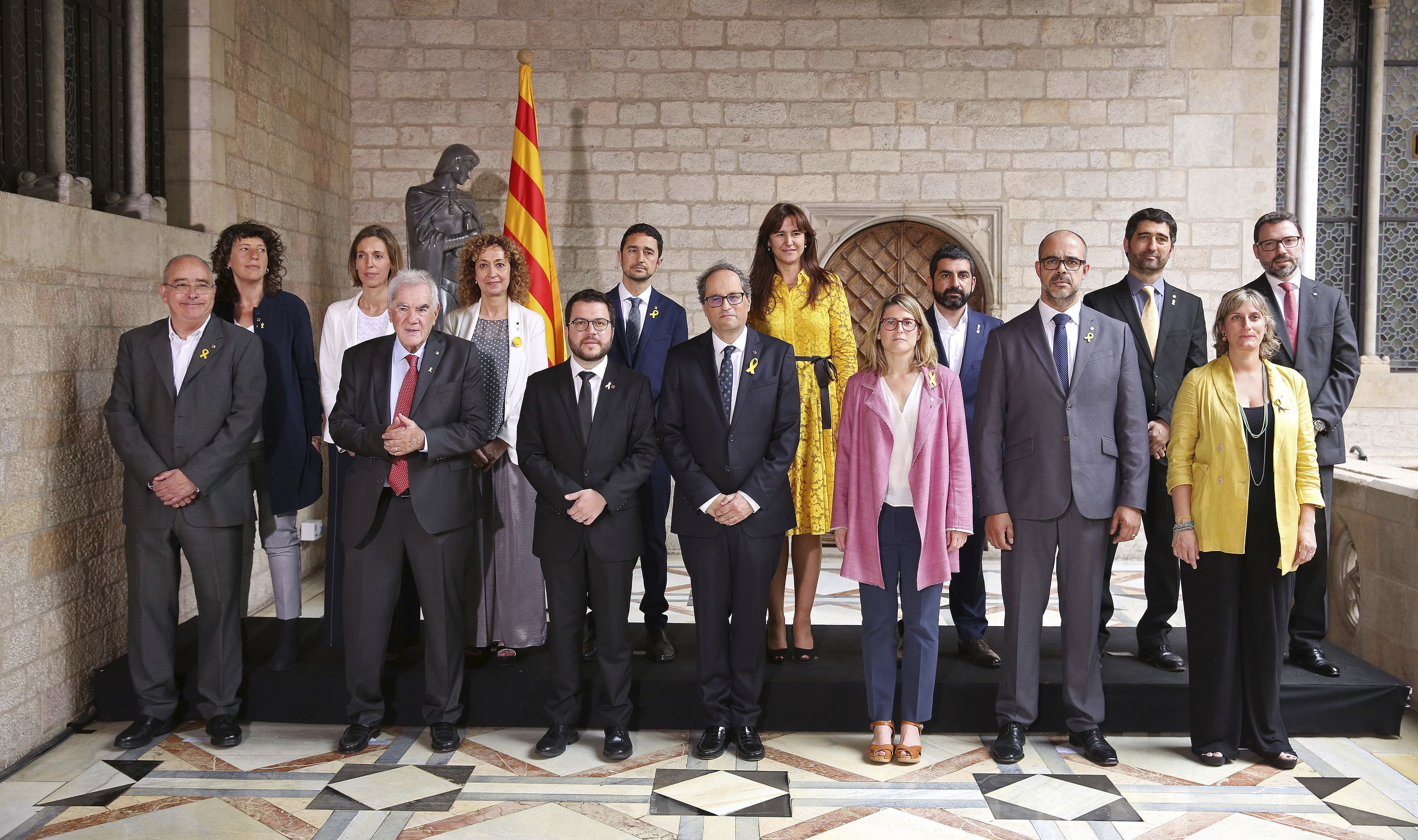
Jordà and other members of the Catalan government on 2 June 2018

Jordà was vice-president of the Fundació Eduard Soler de Ripoll, president of the Fundació Guifré and a member of the executive of the Federació de Municipis de Catalunya.

Jordà contested the 2011 general election as a Republican Left of Catalonia–Catalonia Yes (ERC–CatSí) candidate in the Province of Girona and was elected to the Congress of Deputies. She was re-elected at the 2015 and 2016 general elections. She resigned from the municipality council in July 2017 to concentrate on her Congress of Deputies work.

On 19 May 2018 newly elected President of Catalonia Quim Torra nominated a new government in which Jordà was to be Minister of Agriculture, Livestock, Fisheries and Food. She was sworn in on 2 June 2018 at the Palau de la Generalitat de Catalunya.

== Political positions ==
In 2013 she defended the effectiveness of homeopathy and other alternative treatments in the Congress of Deputies. In July 2018, as Minister of Agriculture, Livestock, Fisheries and Food of the Catalan government, she promoted the consumption of raw milk in the region.

== Electoral history ==
Electoral history of Teresa Jordà
Election	Constituency	Party	Alliance	No.	Result
1999 local	Ripoll	Republican Left of Catalonia	Republican Left of Catalonia-Acord Municipal	1	Elected
2003 local	Ripoll	Republican Left of Catalonia	Republican Left of Catalonia-Acord Municipal	1	Elected
2007 local	Ripoll	Republican Left of Catalonia	Republican Left of Catalonia-Acord Municipal	1	Elected
2011 local	Ripoll	Republican Left of Catalonia	Republican Left of Catalonia-Acord Municipal	1	Elected
2011 general	Province of Girona	Republican Left of Catalonia	Republican Left of Catalonia–Catalonia Yes	1	Elected
2015 local	Ripoll	Republican Left of Catalonia	Republican Left of Catalonia-Acord Municipal	1	Elected
2015 general	Province of Girona	Republican Left of Catalonia	Republican Left of Catalonia–Catalonia Yes	1	Elected
2016 general	Province of Girona	Republican Left of Catalonia	Republican Left of Catalonia–Catalonia Yes	1	Elected
