= Sònia Farré Fidalgo =

Catalan activist, teacher, and politician

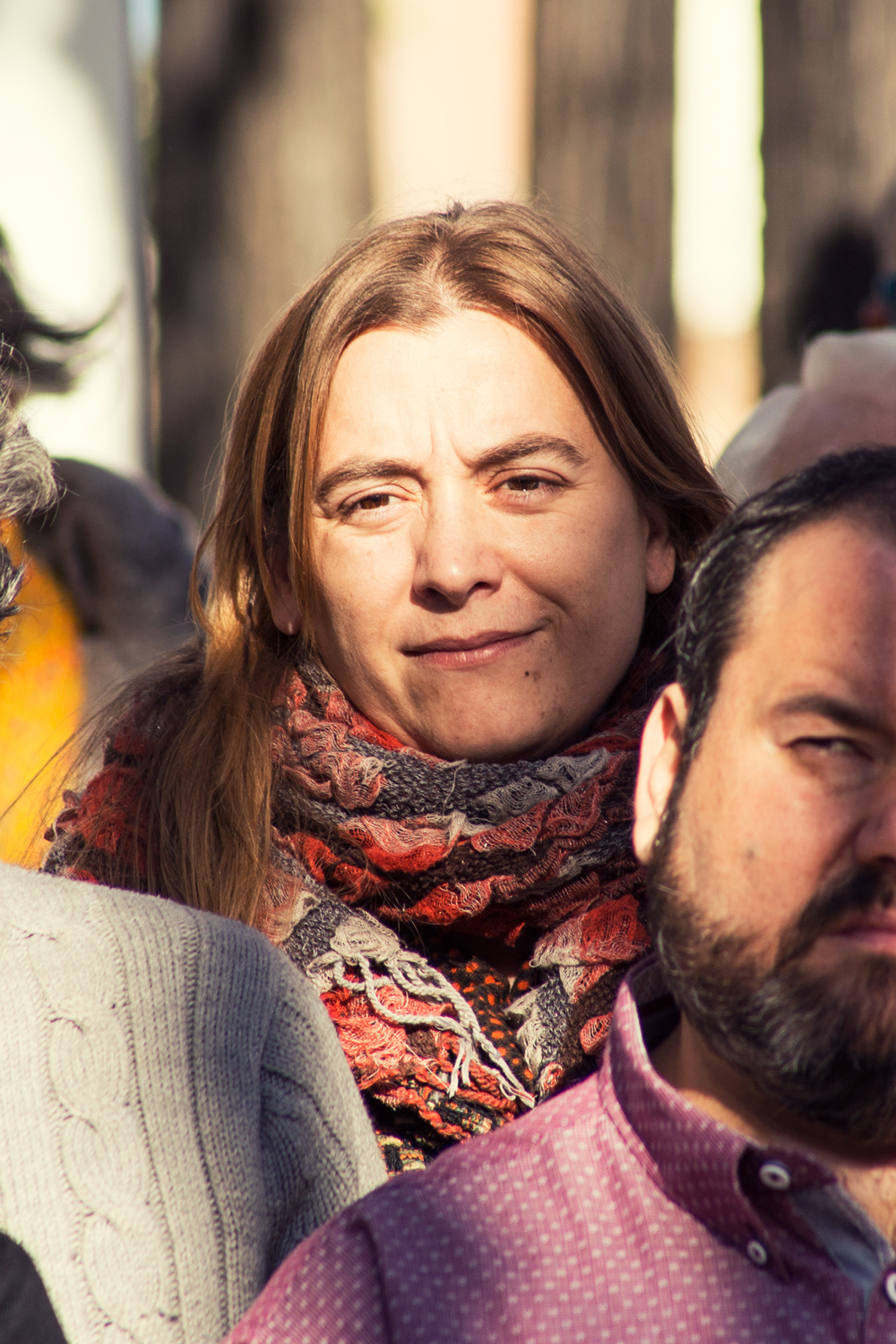
- Born: January 3, 1976 (age 50); Hospitalet de Llobregat
- Occupations: Activist, politician

Sonia Farré Fidalgo (born 3 January 1976 in Hospitalet de Llobregat) is a Catalan activist, teacher, and politician. She is a deputy in the Congress of Deputies in the XII Legislature.

== Biography ==
Graduating in Catalan Philology, she worked as a Catalan teacher in secondary education. Since 1989 she has been a volunteer leisure instructor.

She started in politics as a result of the mobilizations of the 15M Movement in Sant Joan Despí. She has been part of the Citizen Debt Audit Platform and is a member of the Constituent Process in Catalonia. Linked to En Comú Podem-Guanyem el Canvi, she has been one of the promoters of the Municipal Citizens Observatory that has received the Memorial for Peace award from the Josep Vidal i Llecha association. In the 2016 Spanish general elections she was elected deputy for the Province of Barcelona.

== See also ==
- Barcelona (Congress of Deputies constituency)
