= Ciprià Ciscar =

Spanish politician and lawyer

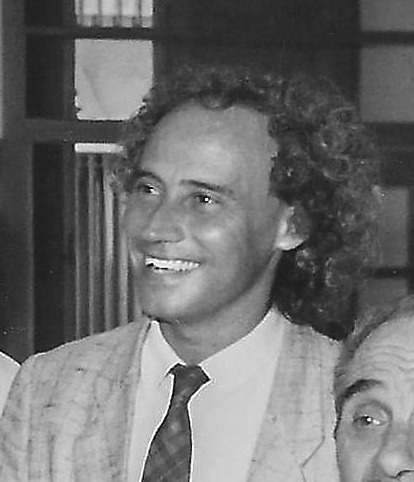
Ciprià Císcar

Ciprià Císcar Casabàn (22 December 1946, in Picanya, Valencia Province) is a lawyer and Spanish politician who belongs to the Spanish Socialist Workers' Party (PSOE) and served as federal secretary of the PSOE from 1994 to 2000.

Císcar was Mayor of Picanya between 1976 and 1983. He served as Culture and Education consultant to the Valencian regional administration from 1981 to 1989 and also served in the regional assembly, the Corts Valencianes, as a deputy from 1983 to 1989. He then joined the national parliament as a deputy for Valencia Province in 1989 and has remained a deputy since then. He headed the list for the 2000 General election but was relegated to second place behind Carmen Alborch for the 2004 election. During his time in parliament, he has served as a member of the Rules Commission and is currently the President of the Defense Commission.

He was mentioned as a possible PSOE candidate for Mayor of Valencia for the 2007 Mayoral election, however Carmen Alborch was selected instead. He is married to Teresa Blat Gimeno and has a son and daughter, Pau and Miriam.
