= Eva García Sempere =

Spanish politician (born 1976)

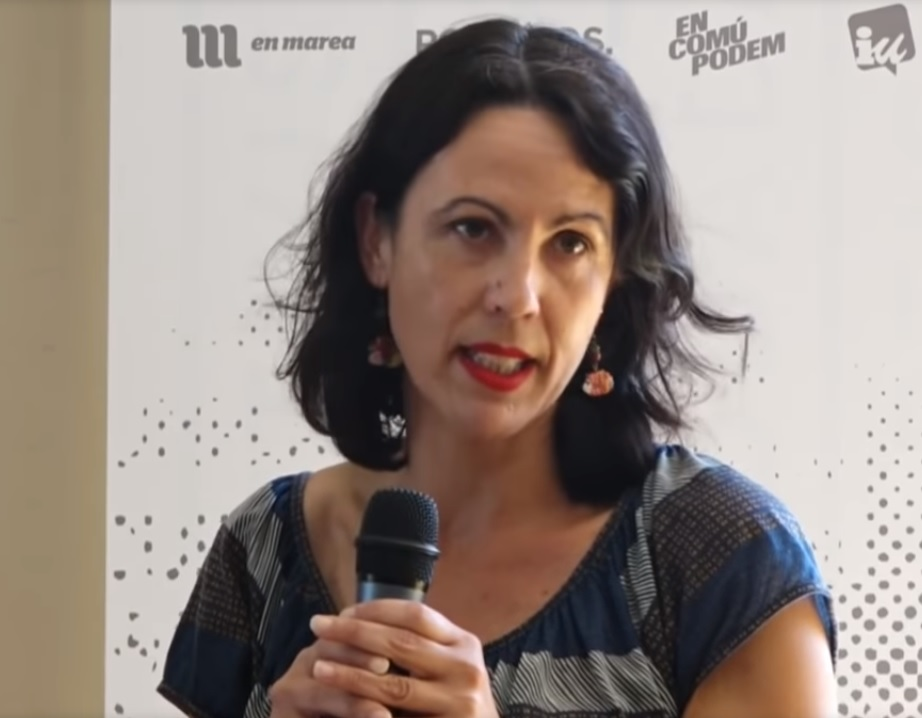

Member of the Congress of Deputies
- Incumbent
- Assumed office 20 May 2019
- Constituency: Málaga

Personal details
- Born: March 28, 1976 (age 50)
- Party: Unidas Podemos; United Left/The Greens–Assembly for Andalusia; Communist Party of Andalusia

Eva García Sempere (born 28 March 1976) is a Spanish communist politician and member of the Congress of Deputies during the 12th and 13th legislatures.

She is a member of the United Left/The Greens–Assembly for Andalusia and the Communist Party of Andalusia.
