= Juan Bravo Baena =

Spanish politician (born 1974)

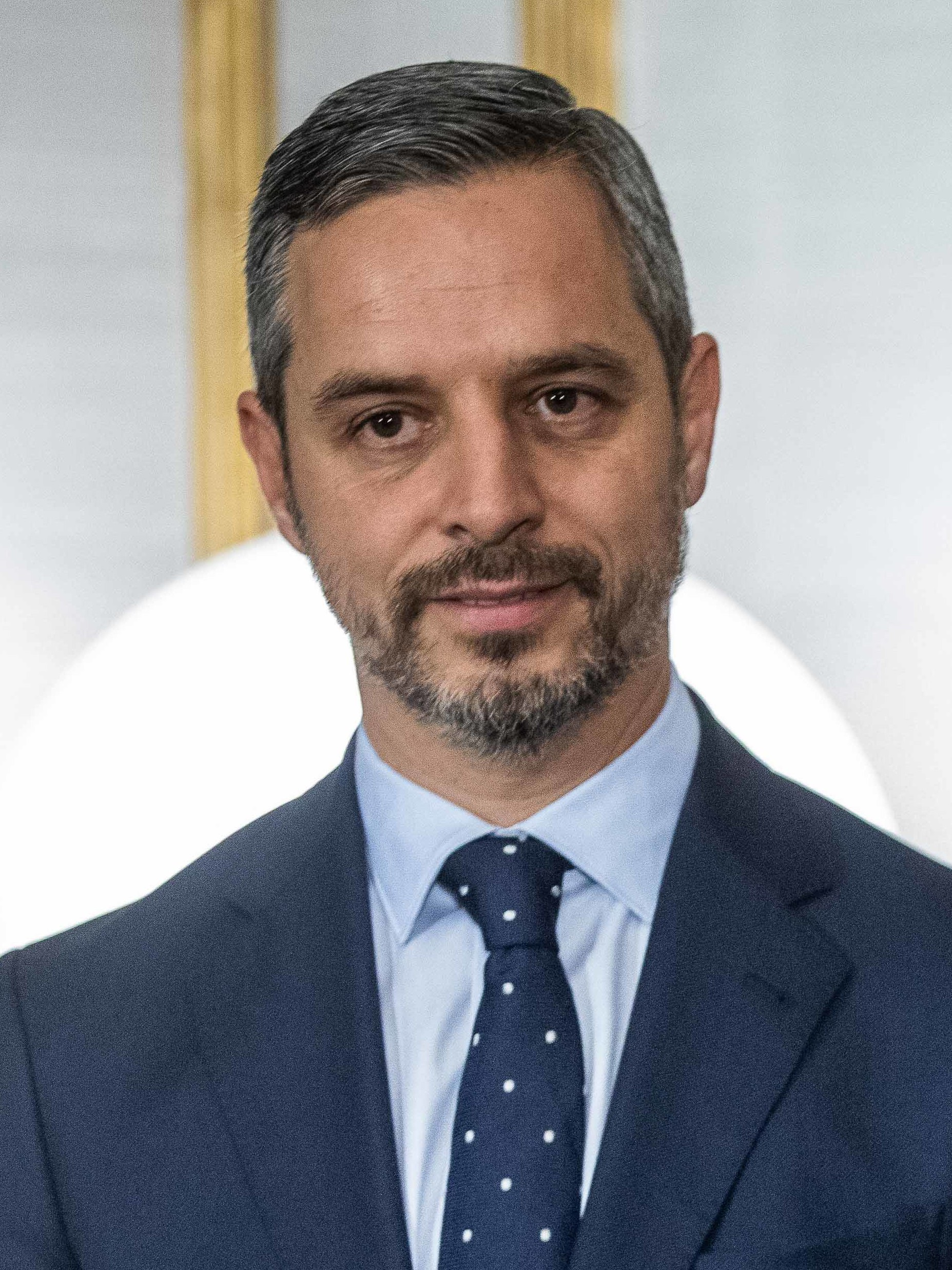
- Bravo in 2019

Member of the Congress of Deputies
- Incumbent
- Assumed office 17 August 2023
- Constituency: Seville
- In office 13 January 2016 – 11 February 2019
- Constituency: Ceuta

Member of the Senate
- In office 28 July 2022 – 26 July 2023
- Appointed by: Parliament of Andalusia

Personal details
- Born: 24 March 1974 (age 52)
- Party: People's Party

Juan Bravo Baena (born 24 March 1974) is a Spanish politician. He has been a member of the Congress of Deputies since 2023, having previously served from 2016 to 2019. From 2022 to 2023, he was a member of the Senate.
