= Ignacio Prendes =

Spanish politician (born 1965)

Ignacio Prendes MP
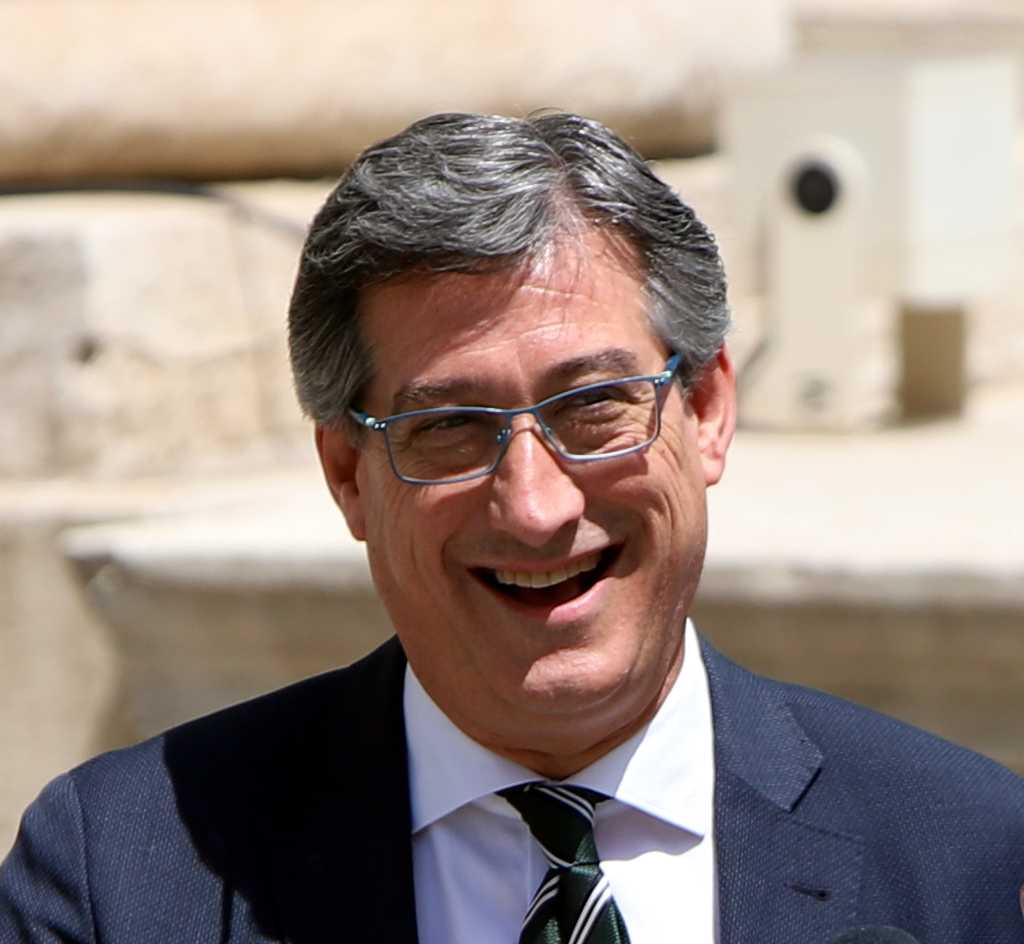

Fourth Vice President of the Congress of Deputies
- In office 21 May 2019 – 3 December 2019
- President: Meritxell Batet
- Preceded by: Gloria Elizo
- Succeeded by: Ignacio Gil

First Vice President of the Congress of Deputies
- In office 19 July 2016 – 20 May 2019
- President: Ana Pastor Julián
- Preceded by: Celia Villalobos
- Succeeded by: Gloria Elizo

Member of Congress of Deputies
- Incumbent
- Assumed office 13 January 2016
- Constituency: Asturias

Member of Asturian General Council
- In office 26 March 2012 – 13 January 2016
- Constituency: Central

Personal details
- Born: José Ignacio Prendes Prendes; 22 February 1965 (age 61) Gijón, Asturias, Spain
- Party: C's (2015–)
- Other political affiliations: UPyD (2007–2015)
- Occupation: Lawyer

José Ignacio Prendes Prendes (born 22 February 1965 in Gijón) is a Spanish politician and member of Congress of the Deputies with the Citizens-Party of the Citizenry party (C's). Since 21 May 2019, he has been the Fourth Vice President of the Congress of Deputies.

He studied law at Oviedo University. In 1998, he obtained a master's degree in law and taxation in Madrid, after which he started his own practice in Gijón, focussing on real estate law.

For a time he was a member of the Citizens-Party of the Citizenry political party. Later, he joined Plataforma Pro which was created to offer an alternative to the established parties. Out of Plataforma Pro emerged the new UPyD party, of which he has been a member since its foundation. He is currently a member of the Direction Council of the party, as coordinator of Institutional Action. In the 2012 Asturian election he headed the UPyD candidate list for the central Asturias constituency. His party received 3.75% of the vote in Asturias as a whole and 4.3% of the vote in his constituency.

On 2015, he came back to C's after being expelled from UPyD. He was elected firstly as member of the General Junta of the Principality of Asturias in the Regional election and later as Deputy in the General election.
