= Rosa Romero =

Spanish politician (born 1970)

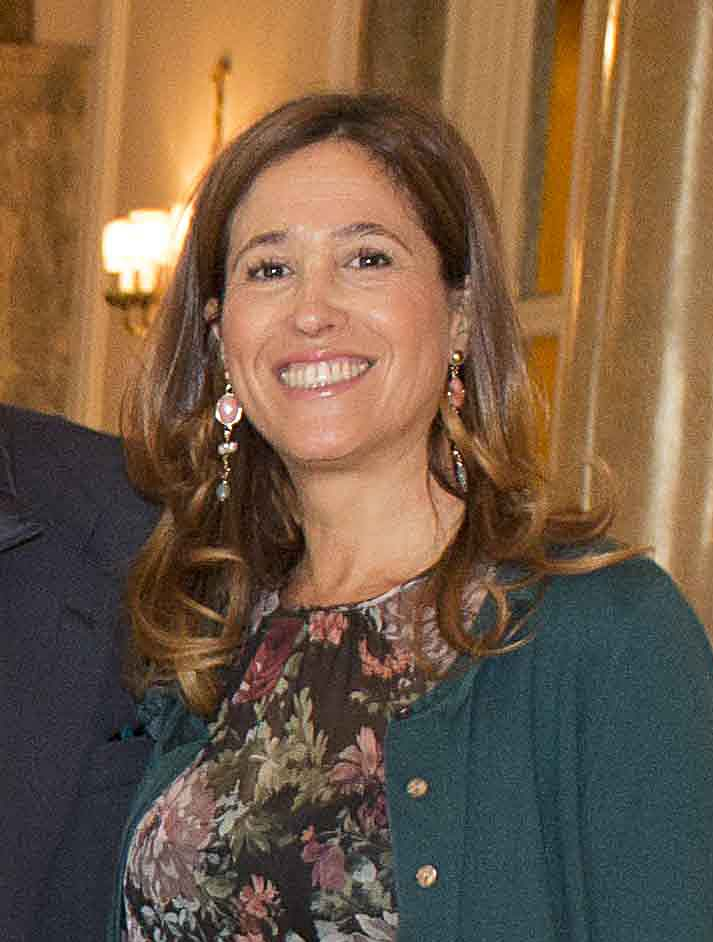
- Romero in 2017

Member of the Senate
- Incumbent
- Assumed office 23 July 2023
- Constituency: Ciudad Real
- In office 26 June 2003 – 28 June 2006
- Appointed by: Cortes of Castilla–La Mancha

Member of the Congress of Deputies
- In office 13 December 2011 – 17 August 2023
- Constituency: Ciudad Real
- In office 12 September 2000 – 16 June 2003
- Constituency: Ciudad Real

Personal details
- Born: 14 February 1970 (age 56)
- Party: People's Party

Rosa María Romero Sánchez (born 14 February 1970) is a Spanish politician. She has been a member of the Senate since 2023, having previously served from 2003 to 2006. She was a member of the Congress of Deputies from 2000 to 2003 and from 2011 to 2023. From 2007 to 2015, she served as mayor of Ciudad Real.
