= 15th Congress of Deputies =

Congress of Deputies from 2023 Spanish general election

←	14th	16th	→
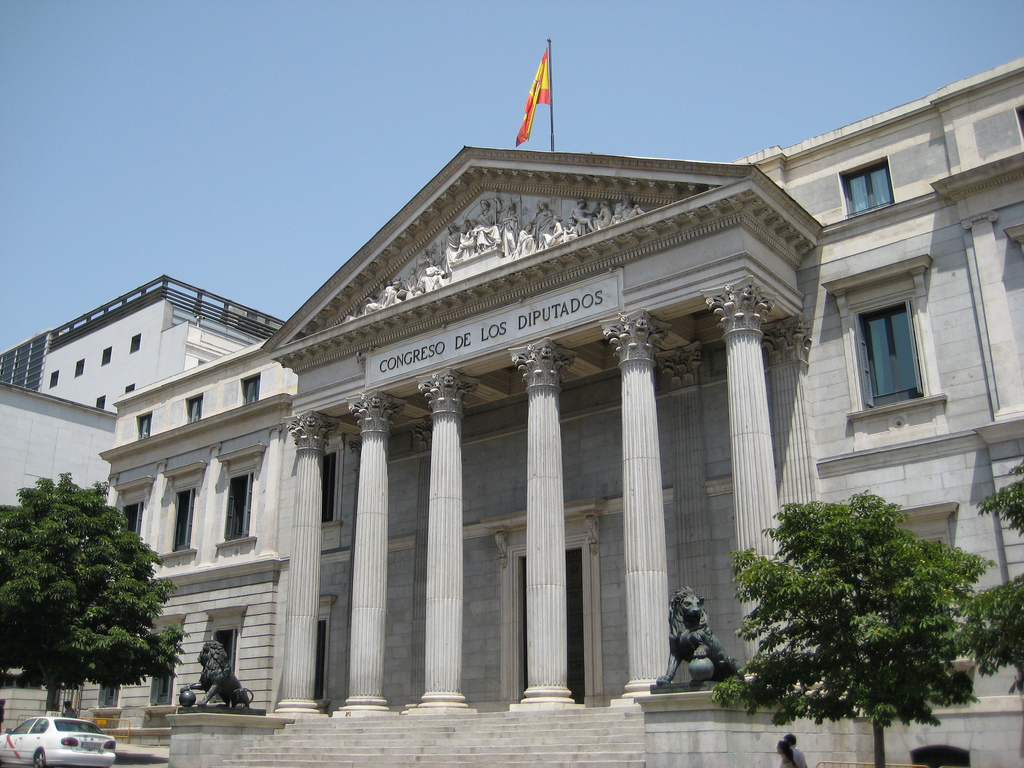

Overview
- Legislative body: Congress of Deputies
- Meeting place: Palacio de las Cortes
- Term: 17 August 2023 –
- Election: 23 July 2023
- Government: Third government of Pedro Sánchez
- Website: congreso.es

Deputies
- Members: 350
- President: Francina Armengol (PSOE)
- First Vice-President: Alfonso Rodríguez (PSOE)
- Second Vice-President: José Antonio Bermúdez de Castro (PP)
- Third Vice-President: Esther Gil de Reboleño Lastortres (SMR)
- Fourth Vice-President: Marta González Vázquez (PP)
- First Secretary: Gerardo Pisarello (ECP)
- Second Secretary: Isaura Leal (PSOE)
- Third Secretary: Guillermo Mariscal Anaya (PP)
- Fourth Secretary: Carmen Navarro Lacoba (PP)

The 15th Congress of Deputies is the current meeting of the Congress of Deputies, the lower house of the Spanish Cortes Generales, with the membership determined by the results of the general election held on 23 July 2023. The congress met for the first time on 17 August 2023. According to the Constitution of Spain the maximum legislative term of the congress is 4 years from the preceding election.

== Composition ==
=== Party membership ===
PP	PSOE		Vox	Sumar						ERC	Junts	EH Bildu	Podemos	PNV	BNG	CC	UPN	Independent	Total
PP	PSOE	PSC	Vox	MS	CatComú	IU	MM	IdPV	MÉS	ERC	Junts	EH Bildu	Podemos	PNV	BNG	CC	UPN	Independent	Total
137	102	19	32	11	6	5	2	1	1	7	7	6	4	5	1	1	1	1	350

=== Demographic profile ===
Women composed 43.7% of elected members (153 out of 350 total) of the Congress of Deputies following the 2023 election. A majority of members of the 15th Congress of Deputies were reported to be between the ages of 51 to 60; only nine individuals under the age of 30 were elected.

== Members by province ==
=== Andalusia (61) ===
Constituency	Seats	List	Seats	Deputies	Party
Almería	6	PP	3	María Isabel Sánchez Torregrosa	PP
Almería	6	PP	3	Rafael Hernando Fraile	PP
Almería	6	PP	3	Ana María Martínez Labella	PP
Almería	6	PSOE	2	Antonio Hernando	PSOE
Almería	6	PSOE	2	Inés María Plaza García	PSOE
Almería	6	Vox	1	Rocío de Meer	Vox
Cádiz	9	PP	4	Pedro Gallardo Barrena	PP
Cádiz	9	PP	4	Ignacio Romaní Cantera	PP
Cádiz	9	PP	4	Macarena Lorente Anaya	PP
Cádiz	9	PP	4	Miguel Ángel Sastre Uyá	PP
Cádiz	9	PSOE	3	Fernando Grande-Marlaska	PSOE
Cádiz	9	PSOE	3	Mamen Sánchez Díaz	PSOE
Cádiz	9	PSOE	3	Juan Carlos Ruiz Boix	PSOE
Cádiz	9	Vox	1	Blanca Armario	Vox
Cádiz	9	Sumar	1	Esther Gil de Reboleño Lastortres	Independent
Córdoba	6	PP	2	María Isabel Prieto Serrano	PP
Córdoba	6	PP	2	Bartolomé Madrid Olmo	PP
Córdoba	6	PSOE	2	Luis Planas Puchades	PSOE
Córdoba	6	PSOE	2	Rafaela Crespín Rubio	PSOE
Córdoba	6	Vox	1	José Ramírez del Río	Vox
Córdoba	6	Sumar	1	Enrique Santiago Romero	IU
Granada	7	PP	3	Carlos Rojas García	PP
Granada	7	PP	3	María Lourdes Ramírez Martín	PP
Granada	7	PP	3	Pablo Hispán	PP
Granada	7	PSOE	2	Carmen Calvo Poyato	PSOE
Granada	7	PSOE	2	José Antonio Rodríguez Salas	PSOE
Granada	7	Vox	1	Jacobo González-Robatto	Vox
Granada	7	Sumar	1	Martina Velarde	Podemos
Huelva	5	PP	2	Bella Verano	PP
Huelva	5	PP	2	Manuel García Félix	PP
Huelva	5	PSOE	2	Gabriel Cruz Santana	PSOE
Huelva	5	PSOE	2	María Luisa Faneca	PSOE
Huelva	5	Vox	1	Tomás Fernández Ríos	Vox
Jaén	5	PP	2	María Luisa Del Moral Leal	PP
Jaén	5	PP	2	Juan Diego Requena Ruiz	PP
Jaén	5	PSOE	2	Juan Francisco Serrano Martínez	PSOE
Jaén	5	PSOE	2	Ana María Cobo Carmona	PSOE
Jaén	5	Vox	1	Francisco José Alcaraz	Vox
Málaga	11	PP	5	Elías Bendodo	PP
Málaga	11	PP	5	María del Mar Vázquez Jiménez	PP
Málaga	11	PP	5	Mario Cortés Carballo	PP
Málaga	11	PP	5	Cristóbal Garre Murcia	PP
Málaga	11	PP	5	Isabel Gema Pérez Recuerda	PP
Málaga	11	PSOE	3	María Nieves Ramírez Moreno	PSOE
Málaga	11	PSOE	3	Ignacio López Cano	PSOE
Málaga	11	PSOE	3	Isabel María Pérez Ortiz	PSOE
Málaga	11	Vox	2	Patricia Rueda Perelló	Vox
Málaga	11	Vox	2	Carlos Hernández Quero	Vox
Málaga	11	Sumar	1	Toni Valero	IU
Seville	12	PSOE	5	María Jesús Montero Cuadrado	PSOE
Seville	12	PSOE	5	Alfonso Rodríguez Gómez de Celis	PSOE
Seville	12	PSOE	5	María Carmen Castilla Álvarez	PSOE
Seville	12	PSOE	5	Francisco José Salazar Rodríguez	PSOE
Seville	12	PSOE	5	Trinidad Argota Castro	PSOE
Seville	12	PP	4	Juan Bravo Baena	PP
Seville	12	PP	4	María Soledad Cruz-Guzmán García	PP
Seville	12	PP	4	Ricardo Tarno Blanco	PP
Seville	12	PP	4	Rafael Benigno Belmonte Gómez	PP
Seville	12	Sumar	2	Francisco Sierra Caballero	IU
Seville	12	Sumar	2	Engracia Rivera Arias	IU
Seville	12	Vox	1	María de los Reyes Romero Vilches	Vox

=== Aragon (13) ===
Constituency	Seats	List	Seats	Deputies	Party
Huesca	3	PP	2	Ana Alós	PP
Huesca	3	PP	2	Javier José Folch Blanc	PP
Huesca	3	PSOE	1	Begoña Nasarre Oliva	PSOE
Teruel	3	PP	2	José Alberto Herrero Bono	PP
Teruel	3	PP	2	Raquel Clemente Muñoz	PP
Teruel	3	PSOE	1	Herminio Sancho Iñiguez	PSOE
Zaragoza	7	PP	3	Pedro Navarro López	PP
Zaragoza	7	PP	3	María del Mar González Bella	Independent
Zaragoza	7	PP	3	Luis María Beamonte	PP
Zaragoza	7	PSOE	2	María Pilar Alegría Continente	PSOE
Zaragoza	7	PSOE	2	Susana Sumelzo Jordán	PSOE
Zaragoza	7	Vox	1	Pedro Fernandez Hernandez	Vox
Zaragoza	7	Sumar	1	Jorge Pueyo Sanz	CHA

=== Asturias (7) ===
Constituency	Seats	List	Seats	Deputies	Party
Asturias	7	PP	3	María Esther Llamazares Domingo	PP
Asturias	7	PP	3	María Mercedes Fernández González	PP
Asturias	7	PP	3	Silverio Argüelles García	PP
Asturias	7	PSOE	2	Adriana Lastra Fernández	PSOE
Asturias	7	PSOE	2	Roberto García Morís	PSOE
Asturias	7	Sumar	1	Rafael Cofiño Fernández	Sumar
Asturias	7	Vox	1	José María Figaredo Álvarez-Sala	Vox

=== Balearic Islands (8) ===
Constituency	Seats	List	Seats	Deputies	Party
Balearic Islands	8	PP	3	José Vicente Marí Bosó	PP
Balearic Islands	8	PP	3	Sandra Fernández Herranz	PP
Balearic Islands	8	PP	3	Joan Mesquida Mayans	PP
Balearic Islands	8	PSOE	3	Francesca Lluch Armengol Socias	PSOE
Balearic Islands	8	PSOE	3	Pepe Mercadal Baquero	PSOE
Balearic Islands	8	PSOE	3	Milena Herrera García	PSOE
Balearic Islands	8	Sumar	1	Vicenç Vidal Matas	MÉS
Balearic Islands	8	Vox	1	Jorge Campos Asensi	Vox

=== Canary Islands (15) ===
Constituency	Seats	List	Seats	Deputies	Party
Las Palmas	8	PSOE	3	Dolores Corujo	PSOE
Las Palmas	8	PSOE	3	Luc André Diouf Dioh	PSOE
Las Palmas	8	PSOE	3	Ada Santana Aguilera	PSOE
Las Palmas	8	PP	3	Jimena Delgado	PP
Las Palmas	8	PP	3	Guillermo Mariscal Anaya	PP
Las Palmas	8	PP	3	Carlos Alberto Sánchez Ojeda	PP
Las Palmas	8	Vox	1	Andrés Alberto Rodríguez Almeida	Vox
Las Palmas	8	Sumar	1	Noemí Santana Perera	Podemos
Santa Cruz de Tenerife	7	PP	3	Juan Antonio Rojas Manrique	PP
Santa Cruz de Tenerife	7	PP	3	Asier Antona Gómez	PP
Santa Cruz de Tenerife	7	PP	3	Laura María Lima García	PP
Santa Cruz de Tenerife	7	PSOE	3	Héctor Gómez Hernández	PSOE
Santa Cruz de Tenerife	7	PSOE	3	Alicia Álvarez González	PSOE
Santa Cruz de Tenerife	7	PSOE	3	Sergio Carlos Matos	PSOE
Santa Cruz de Tenerife	7	CC	1	Cristina Valido García	CC

=== Cantabria (5) ===
Constituency	Seats	List	Seats	Deputies	Party
Cantabria	5	PP	2	Félix de las Cuevas Cortés	PP
Cantabria	5	PP	2	Javier Noriega Gómez	PP
Cantabria	5	PSOE	2	Pedro Casares Hontañón	PSOE
Cantabria	5	PSOE	2	Noelia Cobo Pérez	PSOE
Cantabria	5	Vox	1	Emilio del Valle	Vox

=== Castilla–La Mancha (21) ===
Constituency	Seats	List	Seats	Deputies	Party
Albacete	4	PP	2	Carmen Navarro Lacoba	PP
Albacete	4	PP	2	Antonio Martínez Gómez	PP
Albacete	4	PSOE	2	Emilio Sáez Cruz	PSOE
Albacete	4	PSOE	2	Isabel Belén Iniesta Egido	PSOE
Ciudad Real	5	PP	2	María del Carmen Fúnez de Gregorio	PP
Ciudad Real	5	PP	2	Enrique Belda Pérez Pedrero	PP
Ciudad Real	5	PSOE	2	Isabel Rodríguez García	PSOE
Ciudad Real	5	PSOE	2	Gonzalo Redondo Cárdenas	PSOE
Ciudad Real	5	Vox	1	Ricardo Chamorro Delmo	Vox
Cuenca	3	PP	2	Beatriz Jiménez Linuesa	PP
Cuenca	3	PP	2	Daniel Pérez Osma	PP
Cuenca	3	PSOE	1	Luis Carlos Sahuquillo	PSOE
Guadalajara	3	PP	1	Antonio Román Jasanada	PP
Guadalajara	3	PSOE	1	Alberto Rojo Blas	PSOE
Guadalajara	3	Vox	1	Angel Lopez Maraver	Vox
Toledo	6	PP	3	José Manuel Velasco Retamosa	PP
Toledo	6	PP	3	María Pilar Alía Aguado	PP
Toledo	6	PP	3	Agustín Conde Bajén	PP
Toledo	6	PSOE	2	Sergio Gutiérrez Prieto	PSOE
Toledo	6	PSOE	2	Milagros Tolón	PSOE
Toledo	6	Vox	1	Manuel Mariscal Zabala	Vox

=== Castile and León (31) ===
Constituency	Seats	List	Seats	Deputies	Party
Ávila	3	PP	2	Héctor Palencia Rubio	PP
Ávila	3	PP	2	Patricia Rodríguez Calleja	PP
Ávila	3	PSOE	1	Manuel Arribas Maroto	PSOE
Burgos	4	PP	2	Ángel Mariano Ibáñez Hernando	PP
Burgos	4	PP	2	María Sandra Moneo Díez	PP
Burgos	4	PSOE	2	Esther Peña Camarero	PSOE
Burgos	4	PSOE	2	Álvaro Morales Álvarez	PSOE
León	4	PP	2	Ester Muñoz	PP
León	4	PP	2	Silvia Franco	PP
León	4	PSOE	2	Javier Alfonso Cendón	PSOE
León	4	PSOE	2	Andrea Fernández Benéitez	PSOE
Palencia	3	PP	2	Milagros Marcos Ortega	PP
Palencia	3	PP	2	Miguel Ángel Paniagua Núñez	PP
Palencia	3	PSOE	1	María Luz Martínez Seijo	PSOE
Salamanca	4	PP	3	José Antonio Bermúdez de Castro Fernández	PP
Salamanca	4	PP	3	María Jesús Moro Almaraz	PP
Salamanca	4	PP	3	Pedro Samuel Martín García	PP
Salamanca	4	PSOE	1	David Serrada Pariente	PSOE
Segovia	3	PP	2	Pablo Pérez Coronado	PP
Segovia	3	PP	2	María del Socorro Cuesta Rodríguez	PP
Segovia	3	PSOE	1	José Luis Aceves Galindo	PSOE
Soria	2	PP	1	Tomás Cabezón Casas	PP
Soria	2	PSOE	1	Luis Alfonso Rey de las Heras	PSOE
Valladolid	5	PP	2	María de las Mercedes Cantalapiedra Álvarez	PP
Valladolid	5	PP	2	Eduardo Carazo Hermoso	PP
Valladolid	5	PSOE	2	Óscar Puente Santiago	PSOE
Valladolid	5	PSOE	2	Luisa Sanz Martínez	PSOE
Valladolid	5	Vox	1	Pablo Sáez Alonso-Muñumer	Vox
Zamora	3	PP	2	Elvira Velasco Morillo	PP
Zamora	3	PP	2	Óscar Ramajo Prada	PP
Zamora	3	PSOE	1	Antidio Fagúndez Campo	PSOE

=== Catalonia (48) ===
Constituency	Seats	List	Seats	Deputies	Party
Barcelona	32	PSOE	13	José Zaragoza Alonso	PSC–PSOE
Barcelona	32	PSOE	13	Mercè Perea Conillas	PSC–PSOE
Barcelona	32	PSOE	13	Francisco Aranda Vargas	PSC–PSOE
Barcelona	32	PSOE	13	Lídia Guinart Moreno	PSC–PSOE
Barcelona	32	PSOE	13	Arnau Ramírez Carner	PSC–PSOE
Barcelona	32	PSOE	13	Carmen Andrés Añón	PSC–PSOE
Barcelona	32	PSOE	13	Ferran Verdejo Vicente	PSC–PSOE
Barcelona	32	PSOE	13	Sonia Guerra López	PSC–PSOE
Barcelona	32	PSOE	13	Juan Carlos Jerez Antequera	PSC–PSOE
Barcelona	32	PSOE	13	Teresa Llorens Carbonell	PSC–PSOE
Barcelona	32	PSOE	13	Ignasi Conesa Coma	PSC–PSOE
Barcelona	32	PSOE	13	Alba Soldevilla Novials	PSC–PSOE
Barcelona	32	PSOE	13	Josep Paré Aregall	PSC–PSOE
Barcelona	32	PP	5	Nacho Martín Blanco	PP
Barcelona	32	PP	5	Santiago Rodríguez Serra	PP
Barcelona	32	PP	5	Cristina Agüera Gago	PP
Barcelona	32	PP	5	María de los Llanos de Luna	PP
Barcelona	32	PP	5	Agustín Parra Gallego	PP
Barcelona	32	Sumar	4	Aina Vidal Sáez	CatComú
Barcelona	32	Sumar	4	Gerardo Pisarello Prados	CatComú
Barcelona	32	Sumar	4	Gala Pin Ferrando	CatComú
Barcelona	32	Sumar	4	Eloi Badia Casas	CatComú
Barcelona	32	ERC	4	Gabriel Rufián Romero	ERC
Barcelona	32	ERC	4	Teresa Jordà i Roura	ERC
Barcelona	32	ERC	4	Francesc-Marc Álvaro i Vidal	Independent
Barcelona	32	ERC	4	Pilar Vallugera i Balañà	ERC
Barcelona	32	Junts	3	Míriam Nogueras	Junts
Barcelona	32	Junts	3	Pilar Calvo i Gómez	Junts
Barcelona	32	Junts	3	Eduard Pujol i Bonell	Junts
Barcelona	32	Vox	2	Juan José Aizcorbe Torra	Vox
Barcelona	32	Vox	2	Carina Mejías Sánchez	Vox
Barcelona	32	Sumar	1	Lilith Verstrynge	Podemos
Girona	6	PSOE	2	Marc Lamuà Estañol	PSC–PSOE
Girona	6	PSOE	2	María Blanca Cercas Mena	PSC–PSOE
Girona	6	Junts	2	Marta Madrenas i Mir	Junts
Girona	6	Junts	2	Josep Maria Cervera Pinart	Junts
Girona	6	ERC	1	Montserrat Bassa i Coll	ERC
Girona	6	Sumar	1	Júlia Boada Danés	CatComú
Lleida	4	PSOE	2	Montserrat Mínguez García	PSC–PSOE
Lleida	4	PSOE	2	Amador Marqués Atés	PSC–PSOE
Lleida	4	ERC	1	Inés Granollers i Cunillera	ERC
Lleida	4	Junts	1	Isidre Gavín Valls	Junts
Tarragona	6	PSOE	2	Valle Mellado Sierra	PSC–PSOE
Tarragona	6	PSOE	2	Andreu Martín Martínez	PSC–PSOE
Tarragona	6	ERC	1	Jordi Salvador Duch	ERC
Tarragona	6	PP	1	Pere Lluís Huguet Tous	PP
Tarragona	6	Sumar	1	Fèlix Alonso Cantorné	IU
Tarragona	6	Junts	1	Josep Maria Cruset Domènech	Junts

=== Extremadura (9) ===
Constituency	Seats	List	Seats	Deputies	Party
Badajoz	5	PSOE	2	María Isabel García López	PSOE
Badajoz	5	PSOE	2	Juan Antonio González Gracia	PSOE
Badajoz	5	PP	2	Antonio Cavacasillas Rodríguez	PP
Badajoz	5	PP	2	Alfonso Carlos Macías Gata	PP
Badajoz	5	Vox	1	Ignacio Hoces Íñiguez	Vox
Cáceres	4	PSOE	2	Begoña García Bernal	PSOE
Cáceres	4	PSOE	2	César Ramos Esteban	PSOE
Cáceres	4	PP	2	Cristina Elena Teniente Sánchez	PP
Cáceres	4	PP	2	Carlos Floriano Corrales	PP

=== Galicia (23) ===
Constituency	Seats	List	Seats	Deputies	Party
A Coruña	8	PP	4	Miguel Tellado	PP
A Coruña	8	PP	4	Marta González Vázquez	PP
A Coruña	8	PP	4	Tristana Moraleja	PP
A Coruña	8	PP	4	Álvaro Pérez López	PP
A Coruña	8	PSOE	2	José Miñones	PSOE
A Coruña	8	PSOE	2	Obdulia Taboadela	PSOE
A Coruña	8	Sumar	1	Marta Lois	Sumar
A Coruña	8	BNG	1	Néstor Rego	BNG
Lugo	4	PP	3	Francisco Conde López	PP
Lugo	4	PP	3	Jaime de Olano	PP
Lugo	4	PP	3	Cristina Abades	PP
Lugo	4	PSOE	1	José Ramón Gómez Besteiro	PSOE
Ourense	4	PP	3	Ana Belén Vázquez Blanco	PP
Ourense	4	PP	3	Rosa Quintana	PP
Ourense	4	PP	3	Celso Delgado	PP
Ourense	4	PSOE	1	Marga Martín	PSOE
Pontevedra	7	PP	3	Ana María Pastor Julián	PP
Pontevedra	7	PP	3	Irene Garrido	PP
Pontevedra	7	PP	3	Pedro Puy Fraga	PP
Pontevedra	7	PSOE	3	David Regades	PSOE
Pontevedra	7	PSOE	3	Marica Adrio	PSOE
Pontevedra	7	PSOE	3	Modesto Pose	PSOE
Pontevedra	7	Sumar	1	Verónica Martínez Barbero	Sumar

=== Madrid (37) ===
Constituency	Seats	List	Seats	Deputies	Party
Madrid	37	PP	16	Alberto Núñez Feijóo	PP
Madrid	37	PP	16	Marta Rivera de la Cruz	PP
Madrid	37	PP	16	Borja Sémper	PP
Madrid	37	PP	16	Eugenia Carballedo	PP
Madrid	37	PP	16	Marta Varela Pazos	PP
Madrid	37	PP	16	Cayetana Álvarez de Toledo	PP
Madrid	37	PP	16	Manuel Cobo	PP
Madrid	37	PP	16	Pedro Muñoz Abrines	PP
Madrid	37	PP	16	Carlos Aragonés Mendiguchía	PP
Madrid	37	PP	16	María del Mar Sánchez Sierra	PP
Madrid	37	PP	16	Miguel Ángel Quintanilla Navarro	PP
Madrid	37	PP	16	Jaime de los Santos	PP
Madrid	37	PP	16	Pablo Vázquez Vega	PP
Madrid	37	PP	16	Aurora Nacarino-Brabo Jiménez	PP
Madrid	37	PP	16	Noelia Núñez González	PP
Madrid	37	PP	16	Carlos García Adanero	PP
Madrid	37	PSOE	10	Pedro Sánchez	PSOE
Madrid	37	PSOE	10	Teresa Ribera	PSOE
Madrid	37	PSOE	10	Félix Bolaños	PSOE
Madrid	37	PSOE	10	Margarita Robles	PSOE
Madrid	37	PSOE	10	José Manuel Albares	PSOE
Madrid	37	PSOE	10	Cristina Narbona	PSOE
Madrid	37	PSOE	10	Óscar López Águeda	PSOE
Madrid	37	PSOE	10	Isaura Leal Fernández	PSOE
Madrid	37	PSOE	10	Rafael Simancas Simancas	PSOE
Madrid	37	PSOE	10	Mercedes González Fernández	PSOE
Madrid	37	Sumar	5	Yolanda Díaz	Sumar
Madrid	37	Sumar	5	Agustín Santos Maraver	Sumar
Madrid	37	Sumar	5	Teslem Andala Ubbi	MM
Madrid	37	Sumar	5	Íñigo Errejón Galván	MP
Madrid	37	Sumar	5	Carlos Martín Urriza	Sumar
Madrid	37	Vox	5	Santiago Abascal Conde	Vox
Madrid	37	Vox	5	María de la Cabeza Ruiz Solás	Vox
Madrid	37	Vox	5	Iván Espinosa de los Monteros	Vox
Madrid	37	Vox	5	Francisco Javier Ortega Smith-Molina	Vox
Madrid	37	Vox	5	Pepa Millán	Vox
Madrid	37	Sumar	1	Ione Belarra	Podemos

=== Murcia (10) ===
Constituency	Seats	List	Seats	Deputies	Party
Murcia	10	PP	4	Luis Alberto Marín González	PP
Murcia	10	PP	4	Isabel Borrego	PP
Murcia	10	PP	4	Violante Tomás Olivares	PP
Murcia	10	PP	4	Juan Luis Pedreño Molina	PP
Murcia	10	PSOE	3	Francisco Lucas Ayala	PSOE
Murcia	10	PSOE	3	Caridad Rives Arcayna	PSOE
Murcia	10	PSOE	3	Joaquín Martínez Salmerón	PSOE
Murcia	10	Vox	2	Lourdes Mendez	Vox
Murcia	10	Vox	2	Joaquín Robles López	Vox
Murcia	10	Sumar	1	Javier Sánchez Serna	Podemos

=== Navarre (5) ===
Constituency	Seats	List	Seats	Deputies	Party
Navarre	5	PSOE	2	Santos Cerdán	PSOE
Navarre	5	PSOE	2	Adriana Maldonado López	PSOE
Navarre	5	EH Bildu	1	María Isabel Pozueta Fernández	EH Bildu
Navarre	5	PP	1	Sergio Sayas	PP
Navarre	5	UPN	1	Alberto Catalán	UPN

=== Basque Country (18) ===
Constituency	Seats	List	Seats	Deputies	Party
Álava	4	PSOE	1	Daniel Senderos Oraá	PSOE
Álava	4	EH Bildu	1	Iñaki Ruiz de Pinedo Undiano	EH Bildu
Álava	4	PP	1	Javier de Andrés	PP
Álava	4	PNV	1	Mikel Legarda	PNV
Biscay	8	PNV	2	Aitor Esteban	PNV
Biscay	8	PNV	2	Idoia Sagastizabal	PNV
Biscay	8	PSOE	2	Patxi López	PSOE
Biscay	8	PSOE	2	María Guijarro Ceballos	PSOE
Biscay	8	EH Bildu	2	Oskar Matute	EH Bildu
Biscay	8	EH Bildu	2	Marije Fullaondo	EH Bildu
Biscay	8	PP	1	Beatriz Fanjul	PP
Biscay	8	Sumar	1	Lander Martínez	Sumar
Gipuzkoa	6	EH Bildu	2	Mertxe Aizpurua Arzallus	EH Bildu
Gipuzkoa	6	EH Bildu	2	Jon Iñarritu García	EH Bildu
Gipuzkoa	6	PSOE	2	Rafaela Romero	PSOE
Gipuzkoa	6	PSOE	2	María Luisa del Pilar García Gurruchaga	PSOE
Gipuzkoa	6	PNV	2	María Isabel Vaquero Montero	PNV
Gipuzkoa	6	PNV	2	Joseba Andoni Agirretxea Urresti	PNV

=== La Rioja (4) ===
Constituency	Seats	List	Seats	Deputies	Party
La Rioja	4	PP	2	Cuca Gamarra	PP
La Rioja	4	PP	2	Javier Merino Martínez	PP
La Rioja	4	PSOE	2	Elisa Garrido Jiménez	PSOE
La Rioja	4	PSOE	2	Raúl Díaz Marín	PSOE

=== Valencian Community (33) ===
Constituency	Seats	List	Seats	Deputies	Party
Alicante	12	PP	5	Macarena Montesinos	PP
Alicante	12	PP	5	Joaquín Melgarejo Moreno	PP
Alicante	12	PP	5	Julia Parra Aparicio	PP
Alicante	12	PP	5	César Sánchez Pérez	PP
Alicante	12	PP	5	Sandra Pascual Rocamora	PP
Alicante	12	PSOE	4	Lázaro Azorín Salar	PSOE
Alicante	12	PSOE	4	Patricia Blanquer Alcaraz	PSOE
Alicante	12	PSOE	4	Lázaro Azorín Salar	PSOE
Alicante	12	PSOE	4	María Araceli Poblador Pacheco	PSOE
Alicante	12	Vox	2	David García Gomis	Vox
Alicante	12	Vox	2	José María Sánchez García	Vox
Alicante	12	Sumar	1	Txema Guijarro García	Sumar
Castellón	5	PP	2	Alberto Fabra	PP
Castellón	5	PP	2	Óscar Clavell López	PP
Castellón	5	PSOE	2	Susana Ros Martínez	PSOE
Castellón	5	PSOE	2	Artemi Vicent Rallo Lombarte	PSOE
Castellón	5	Vox	1	Alberto Asarta	Vox
Valencia	16	PP	6	Esteban González Pons	PP
Valencia	16	PP	6	Belén Hoyo Juliá	PP
Valencia	16	PP	6	Esperanza Reynal Reillo	PP
Valencia	16	PP	6	Fernando de Rosa Torner	PP
Valencia	16	PP	6	Carlos Gil Santiago	PP
Valencia	16	PP	6	Alma Elvira Alfonso Silvestre	PP
Valencia	16	PSOE	5	Diana Morant	PSOE
Valencia	16	PSOE	5	José Luis Ábalos Meco	PSOE
Valencia	16	PSOE	5	Carmen Martínez Ramírez	PSOE
Valencia	16	PSOE	5	Vicent Sarrià i Morell	PSOE
Valencia	16	PSOE	5	Marta Trenzano Rubio	PSOE
Valencia	16	Sumar	3	Àgueda Micó	Més
Valencia	16	Sumar	3	Alberto Ibáñez Mezquita	IdPV
Valencia	16	Sumar	3	Nahuel González López	IU
Valencia	16	Vox	2	Carlos Flores Juberías	Vox
Valencia	16	Vox	2	Ignacio Gil Lázaro	Vox

=== Ceuta (1) ===
Constituency	Seats	List	Seats	Deputies	Party
Ceuta	1	PP	1	Javier Celaya Brey	PP

=== Melilla (1) ===
Constituency	Seats	List	Seats	Deputies	Party
Melilla	1	PP	1	Sofía Acedo Reyes	PP

== Deputies who resigned ==
Constituency	List	Resignations	New MP	Reason
A Coruña	PSOE	José Miñones Conde	María Montserrat García Chavarría	Appointed as president of Mercasa
A Coruña	PSOE	Obdulia Taboadela	Diego Taibo Monelos	Appointed as government subdelegate in A Coruña
A Coruña	Sumar	Marta Lois	Manuel Lago Peñas	Lead candidate for the 2024 Galician election
Álava	PP	Javier de Andrés Guerra	Carmelo Barrios	Lead candidate for the 2024 Basque election
Álava	EH Bildu	Iñaki Ruiz de Pinedo	Mikel Otero	Retirement from politics
Almería	PSOE	Antonio Hernando Vera	Juan Antonio Lorenzo Cazorla	Focus on work in the national government
Asturias	PSOE	Adriana Lastra	Mercedes Otero García	Elected government delegate to Asturias
Balearic Islands	PP	Sandra Fernández Herranz	Carlos Simarro	Moved to the Balearic regional government
Barcelona	PSOE	Meritxell Batet Lamaña	Ignasi Conesa Coma	Retirement from politics
Barcelona	PSOE	Miquel Iceta Llorens	Alba Soldevilla Novials	Appointed Spanish Ambassador to UNESCO
Barcelona	PSOE	Raquel Sánchez Jiménez	Josep Paré Aregall	Switching to the private sector
Barcelona	PSOE	Teresa Llorens	Oriol Almirón	Moved to the Catalan regional government
Barcelona	PSOE	Sonia Guerra López	Andrea Canelo Matito	Moved to the Catalan regional government
Barcelona	Junts	Eduard Pujol	Josep Pagès	Becoming member of the Senate
Barcelona	Sumar	Lilith Verstrynge	Candela López	Personal reasons
Barcelona	Sumar	Gala Pin	Viviane Ogou	Personal reasons
Biscay	PSOE	María Guijarro	Gabriel Blanco Arrúe	Appointed as Secretary of State for Equality
Biscay	PNV	Aitor Esteban	Nerea Renteria	Becoming leader of the Basque Nationalist Party
Cáceres	PSOE	Begoña García Bernal	Emilia Almodóvar Sánchez	Appointed as Secretary of State for Agriculture and Food
Cádiz	PSOE	Fernando Grande-Marlaska	María Isabel Moreno Fernández	Focus on minister position
Cádiz	PP	Ignacio Romaní Cantera	Inmaculada Marín Aparicio	Candidate for the 2026 Andalusian election
Cantabria	PSOE	Pedro Casares	Pablo Antuñano	Appointed as government delegate to Cantabria
Córdoba	PSOE	Luis Planas	Alberto Mayoral de Lamo	Focus on minister position
Ciudad Real	PSOE	Isabel Rodríguez García	Cristina López Zamora	Focus on minister position
Girona	ERC	Montserrat Bassa	Etna Estrems	Personal reasons
Granada	PSOE	Carmen Calvo	Olvido de la Rosa	Elected president of the Spanish Council of State
Jaén	PP	María Luisa del Moral	María Torres Tejada	Moved to the Andalusian regional government
Lugo	PSOE	José Ramón Gómez Besteiro	Patricia Otero Rodríguez	Focus on his role after the 2024 Galician elections
Madrid	PSOE	Teresa Ribera	Javier Rodríguez Palacios	Focus on minister position
Madrid	PSOE	Margarita Robles	Hana Jalloul	Focus on minister position
Madrid	PSOE	Hana Jalloul	María Sainz Martín	Elected to the European Parliament
Madrid	PSOE	José Manuel Albares	Zaida Cantera	Focus on minister position
Madrid	PSOE	Zaida Cantera	Guillermo Hita	Retirement from politics
Madrid	PSOE	Óscar López Águeda	Víctor Gutiérrez Santiago	Focus on minister position
Madrid	PSOE	Mercedes González Fernández	Vicente Montávez Aguillaume	Reappointed as director general of the Spanish Civil Guard
Madrid	PP	Pablo Vázquez Vega	Edurne Uriarte	Focus on role as president of Reformismo21 foundation
Madrid	PP	Marta Rivera de la Cruz	José Enrique Núñez	Focus on role in the Madrid City Council
Madrid	PP	Noelia Núñez	Elvira Rodríguez	Falsified curriculum vitae
Madrid	Vox	Iván Espinosa de los Monteros	Juan Luis Steegmann Olmedillas	Political disagreements
Madrid	Vox	Juan Luis Steegmann Olmedillas	Carla Toscano de Balbín	Political disagreements
Madrid	Vox	Carla Toscano de Balbín	Rocío Aguirre	Political disagreements
Madrid	Sumar	Iñigo Errejón	Alda Recas	Sexual assault allegations
Murcia	PSOE	Francisco Lucas Ayala	Irene Jódar Pérez	Appointed as government delegate to Murcia
Murcia	PP	Luis Alberto Marín	Mirian Guardiola	Moved to the Murcian regional government
Navarre	PSOE	Santos Cerdán	Iván Cacho Isla	Corruption case (Koldo affair)
Pontevedra	PSOE	David Regades Fernández	Paula Fernández Pena	Appointed as government delegate for the Vigo Free Trade Zone Consortium
Pontevedra	PSOE	Paula Fernández Pena	Luis Antonio Gómez Piña	Focus on local politics
Pontevedra	PP	Ana Pastor Julián	Juan Andrés Bayón	Retirement from politics
Santa Cruz de Tenerife	PSOE	Héctor Gómez	Esther Rodríguez Suárez	Appointed Spanish ambassador to the UN
Santa Cruz de Tenerife	PSOE	Sergio Carlos Matos	Jonay Quintero Hernández	Personal reasons
Santa Cruz de Tenerife	PP	Asier Antona	Ainhoa Molina	Focus on role as mayor of Santa Cruz de la Palma
Seville	PSOE	Paco Salazar	José Losada Fernández	
Seville	PSOE	María Jesús Montero	Brígida Pachón Martín	Lead candidate for the 2026 Andalusian election
Tarragona	PP	Pedro Luis Huguet	María Elisa Vedrina	Focus on role in the Parliament of Catalonia
Toledo	PSOE	Milagros Tolón	Jesús Mayoral Pérez	Appointed as government delegate to Castilla-La Mancha
Valencia	PSOE	Diana Morant	Víctor Camino Miñana	Focus on minister position
Valencia	PSOE	José Luis Ábalos	Ana González Herdaro	Corruption case (Koldo affair)
Valencia	PP	Esteban González Pons	Cristina Moreno Borrás	
Valencia	PP	Carlos Gil Santiago	Evarist Aznar Teruel	Moved to the Valencian regional government
Zaragoza	PSOE	Pilar Alegría	Víctor Javier Ruiz de Diego	Focus on minister position
Zaragoza	PSOE	Susana Sumelzo	Marta Gracia Blanco	Focus on role as Secretary of State for Ibero-America
Zaragoza	PP	María del Mar González	Raúl Cuevas Larrosa	
Zaragoza	PP	Pedro Navarro López	María Elena Bondía Pinós	Retirement from politics
Zaragoza	Sumar	Jorge Pueyo	Laura Vergara Román	Lead candidate for the 2026 Aragonese election

== Deputies who changed parties ==
Constituency	List	Deputy	New party	Reason
Madrid	Vox	Javier Ortega Smith	Indep./Mixed Group	Political disagreements
Valencia	PSOE	José Luis Ábalos	Indep./Mixed Group	Corruption case (Koldo affair)
Valencia	Sumar	Àgueda Micó	Més-Compromís	Sumar’s refusal to have prime minister Pedro Sánchez appear before the DANA inquiry committee in Congress
Zaragoza	Vox	Pedro Fernández Hernández	Indep. (Note: Remained a member of the Vox parliamentary group.)	Personal reasons
