= Barrena =

Barrena is a surname of Spanish origin.

== People with the surname ==
- Carlos Barrena (born 1982), Peruvian footballer
- Marcel Barrena (born 1981), Spanish actor and director
- Óscar Barrena (born 1966), Spanish field hockey player
- Pedro Gallardo Barrena (born 1974), Spanish politician
- Pernando Barrena (born 1965), Basque politician
- Rogelio de Egusquiza y Barrena (1845–1915), Spanish painter

== See also ==
- Barre (name)
- Barrera
