= Cantera (disambiguation) =

A cantera is geographical area that football clubs recruit players from.

Cantera may also refer to:

== Places ==
- Cantera (Ponce), a barrio of Ponce, Puerto Rico
- La Cantera Formation, a geologic formation in Argentina
- La Cantera, San Antonio, a district of San Antonio, Texas
- Las Canteras, Chile, a town in Biobío Region, Chile
- Las Canteras, Uruguay, a barrio of Montevideo, Uruguay

== People ==
- Francisco Cantera Burgos (1901–1978), Spanish historian
- Ignacio Romaní Cantera, Spanish politician
- Maximiliano Cantera (born 1993), Uruguayan footballer
- Zaida Cantera (born 1977), Spanish military officer and politician

== Other uses ==
- Cantera (software), chemical kinetics software
- Cantera (stone), volcanic, quartz-based stone or quarry in Spanish
