= Isabel Belén Iniesta Egido =

Spanish politician (born 1989)

Isabel Belén Iniesta Egido MP

Member of the Congress of Deputies
- Incumbent
- Assumed office 2023
- Constituency: Albacete

Personal details
- Born: 9 November 1989 (age 36) Alpera, Spain
- Political party: Spanish Socialist Workers' Party

Isabel Belén Iniesta Egido (born 9 November 1989) is a Spanish politician from the Spanish Socialist Workers' Party. In the 2023 Spanish general election she was elected to the Congress of Deputies in Albacete. She also serves as the mayor of Alpera.

== See also ==
- 15th Congress of Deputies
