= Elisa Garrido =

Elisa Garrido may refer to:

- Elisa Garrido García (1909–1990), Aragonese anti-fascist militant
- Elisa Garrido Jiménez (born 1976), Spanish politician
