= Mesquida =

Mesquida is a surname. Notable people with the surname include:

- Joan Mesquida (1962–2020), Spanish politician
- Joan Mesquida Mayans (born 1968), Spanish politician
- Kléber Mesquida (born 1945), French politician
- Roxane Mesquida (born 1981), French actress
