= Steegmann =

Steegmann is a surname. Notable people with the surname include:

- Juan Luis Steegmann Olmedillas (born 1955), Spanish hematologist
- Marcus Steegmann (born 1982), German footballer
