= Labellum =

Labellum (plural: labella) is the Latin diminutive of labium, meaning lip. These are anatomical terms used descriptively in biology:

- Labellum (botany), a part of a flower
- Labellum (insect anatomy), a part of the mouth of an insect

Labella is also a surname.

- Ana María Martínez Labella, Spanish politician
- Edgardo Labella (1951–2021), Filipino politician

== See also ==
- La Bella, portrait of an unidentified woman by Titian
