= Milena Herrera García =

Spanish politician (born 1975)

Milena Herrera García MP

Member of the Congress of Deputies
- Incumbent
- Assumed office 2023
- Constituency: Balearic Islands

Personal details
- Born: 14 June 1975 (age 50) Madrid, Spain
- Political party: Spanish Socialist Workers' Party

Milena Herrera García (born 14 June 1975) is a Spanish politician from the Spanish Socialist Workers' Party. In the 2023 Spanish general election she was elected to the Congress of Deputies in Balearic Islands.

== See also ==
- 15th Congress of Deputies
