= Luisa Sanz Martínez =

Spanish politician (born 1970)

Luisa Sanz Martínez MP
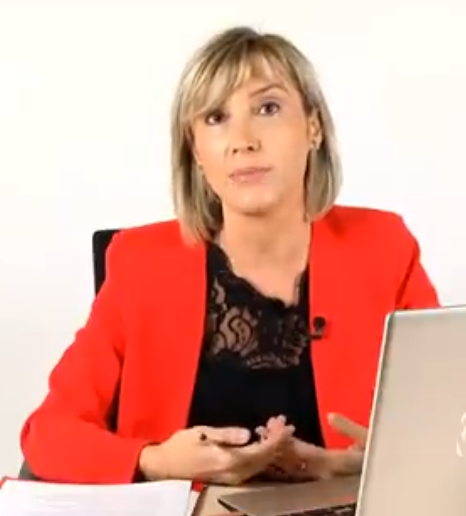
- In a video for Universidad Isabel I in 2015

Member of the Congress of Deputies
- Incumbent
- Assumed office 17 August 2023
- Constituency: Valladolid

Personal details
- Born: 20 September 1970 (age 55)
- Party: Spanish Socialist Workers' Party

Luisa Sanz Martínez (born 20 September 1970) is a Spanish politician from the Spanish Socialist Workers' Party. In the 2023 Spanish general election she was elected to the Congress of Deputies in Valladolid.

She was Secretary of Training at the PSOE of Valladolid.

== See also ==
- 15th Congress of Deputies
