= María Lourdes Ramírez Martín =

Spanish politician (born 1979)

María Lourdes Ramírez Martín MP

Member of the Congress of Deputies
- Incumbent
- Assumed office 2023
- Constituency: Granada

Personal details
- Born: 12 August 1979 (age 46) Spain
- Party: People's Party (Spain)

María Lourdes Ramírez Martín (born 12 August 1979) is a Spanish politician from the People's Party. In the 2023 Spanish general election she was elected to the Congress of Deputies in Granada.

== See also ==
- 15th Congress of Deputies
