= María Isabel Prieto Serrano =

Spanish politician (born 1973)

María Isabel Prieto Serrano MP

Member of the Congress of Deputies
- Incumbent
- Assumed office 2023
- Constituency: Córdoba

Personal details
- Born: Spain
- Party: People's Party (Spain)
- Education: University of Córdoba (Spain)

Maria Isabel Prieto Serrano (born 1973) is a Spanish politician from the People's Party. She was elected to the Congress of Deputies in the 2023 Spanish general election. Since 2001, she has been part of the Superior Corps of lawyers of the Social Security Administration.

== See also ==
- 15th Congress of Deputies
