= María Nieves Ramírez Moreno =

Spanish politician (born 1984)

María Nieves Ramírez Moreno MP

Member of the Congress of Deputies
- Incumbent
- Assumed office 2023
- Constituency: Málaga

Personal details
- Born: 28 July 1984 (age 41) Málaga, Spain
- Party: Spanish Socialist Workers' Party

María de las Nieves Ramírez Moreno (born 28 July 1984) is a Spanish politician from the Spanish Socialist Workers' Party. In the 2023 Spanish general election she was elected to the Congress of Deputies in Málaga.

== See also ==
- 15th Congress of Deputies
