= Alberto Rojo Blas =

Spanish politician

Alberto Rojo
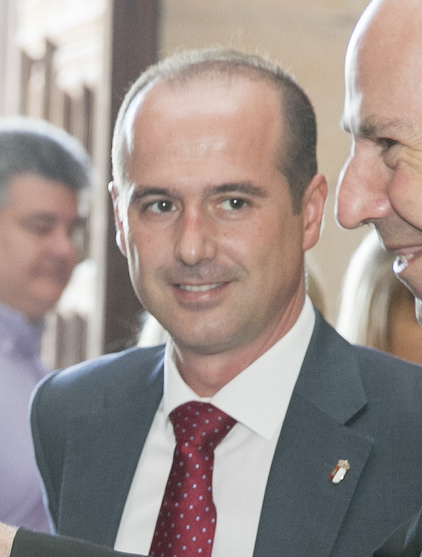

Mayor of Guadalajara
- Incumbent
- Assumed office 15 June 2019

Member of the Cortes of Castilla–La Mancha
- In office 2003–2007
- Constituency: Guadalajara

Mayor of Hita
- In office 2003–2011

Personal details
- Born: 1975 (age 50–51) Guadalajara, Spain
- Party: Spanish Socialist Workers' Party

Alberto Rojo Blas (born 1975) is a Spanish politician, Mayor of Guadalajara since June 2019. He previously served as Mayor of Hita from 2003 to 2011. He is a member of the Spanish Socialist Workers' Party (PSOE).

== Biography ==
Born in 1975 in Guadalajara, Rojo earned a diploma in Business Sciencies from the University of Alcalá. He become a member of the Socialist Youth organization in Guadalajara, becoming their Secretary-General, in what it was his first political responsibility. He was Mayor of Hita between 2003 and 2011. He was a member of the 6th Cortes of Castilla–La Mancha (2003–2007). Employed at the logistics company Grupo Pol between 2010 and 2015, Rojo was appointed as Delegate of the Junta de Comunidades de Castilla–La Mancha in Guadalajara in 2015. He led the PSOE list vis-à-vis the May 2019 municipal election in Guadalajara. Following the announcement of a government agreement with Citizens, Rojo was invested Mayor on 15 June 2019.

He was elected to the 15th Congress of Deputies from Guadalajara in the 2023 Spanish general election.
