= Caridad Rives Arcayna =

Spanish politician (born 1972)

Caridad Rives Arcayna MP

Member of the Congress of Deputies
- Incumbent
- Assumed office 2023
- Constituency: Murcia

Personal details
- Born: 13 June 1972 (age 53) Spain
- Party: Spanish Socialist Workers' Party

Caridad Rives Arcayna (born 13 June 1972) is a Spanish politician from the Spanish Socialist Workers' Party. In the 2023 Spanish general election she was elected to the Congress of Deputies in Murcia.

== See also ==
- 15th Congress of Deputies
