= María Isabel Sánchez Torregrosa =

Spanish politician (born 1979)

María Isabel Sánchez Torregrosa MP

Member of the Congress of Deputies
- Incumbent
- Assumed office 23 July 2023
- Constituency: Almería

Member of the Senate of Spain for Almería
- In office 13 January 2016 – 31 December 2018

Personal details
- Born: 5 August 1979 (age 47) Vélez-Rubio, Spain
- Party: People's Party (Spain)
- Education: University of Granada

María Isabel Sánchez Torregrosa (born 5 August 1979) is a Spanish politician from the People's Party. She was elected to the Congress of Deputies in the 2023 Spanish general election.

== See also ==
- 11th Senate of Spain
- 12th Senate of Spain
- 15th Congress of Deputies
