= Macarena Lorente Anaya =

Spanish politician

Macarena Lorente Anaya MP

Member of the Congress of Deputies
- Incumbent
- Assumed office 2023
- Constituency: Cádiz

Personal details
- Born: Spain
- Party: People's Party (Spain)

Macarena Lorente Anaya is a Spanish politician from the People's Party. She was elected to the Congress of Deputies in the 2023 Spanish general election.

== See also ==
- 15th Congress of Deputies
