= Miguel Ángel Sastre Uyá =

Spanish politician

Miguel Ángel Sastre Uyá MP
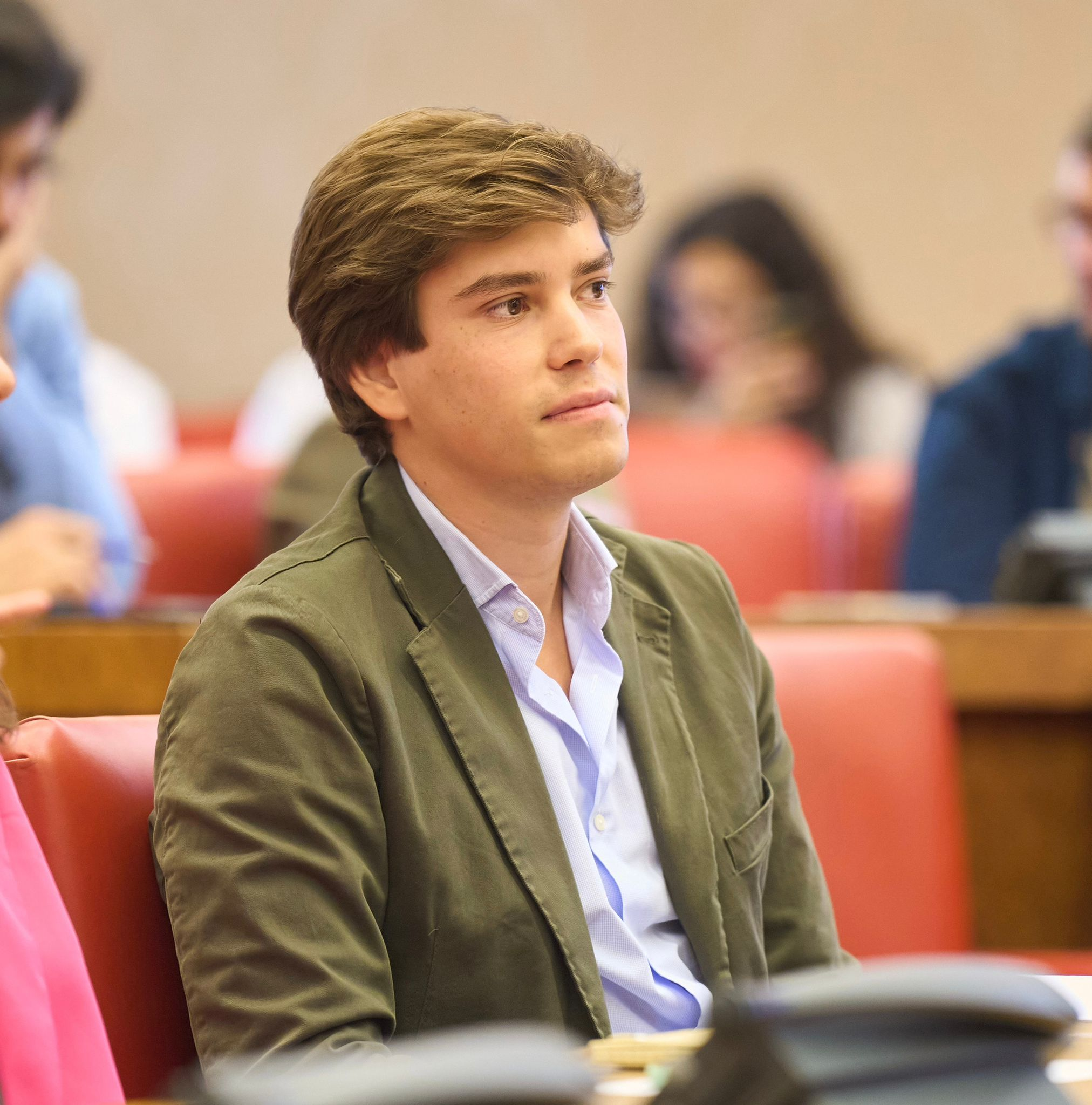
- Miguel Ángel Sastre Uyá in 2025

Member of the Congress of Deputies
- Incumbent
- Assumed office 2023
- Constituency: Cádiz

Personal details
- Born: 5 April 1996 (age 30) Cádiz, Spain
- Party: People's Party

Miguel Ángel Sastre Uyá (born 5 April 1996) is a Spanish politician from the People's Party. He was elected to the Congress of Deputies in the 2023 Spanish general election.

He was candidate in the 2019 Spanish local elections.

== See also ==
- 15th Congress of Deputies
