= Ada Santana Aguilera =

Spanish politician (born 1998)

Ada Santana Aguilera MP

Member of the Congress of Deputies
- Incumbent
- Assumed office 2023
- Constituency: Las Palmas

Personal details
- Born: 29 April 1998 (age 27) Las Palmas de Gran Canaria, Spain
- Party: Spanish Socialist Workers' Party

Ada Santana Aguilera (born 29 April 1998) is a Spanish politician from the Spanish Socialist Workers' Party. In the 2023 Spanish general election she was elected to the Congress of Deputies in Las Palmas. She is the first post-millennial member of the Parliament of Spain. She is also the youngest member of the 15th Congress of Deputies.

== See also ==
- 15th Congress of Deputies
