= María Carmen Castilla Álvarez =

Spanish politician (born 1968)

María Carmen Castilla Álvarez MP

Member of the Congress of Deputies
- Incumbent
- Assumed office 2023
- Constituency: Seville

Personal details
- Born: 4 December 1968 (age 57) Écija, Spain
- Party: Spanish Socialist Workers' Party

María Carmen Castilla Álvarez (born 4 December 1968) is a Spanish politician from the Spanish Socialist Workers' Party. In the 2023 Spanish general election she was elected to the Congress of Deputies in Seville.

== See also ==
- 15th Congress of Deputies
