= Ana María Cobo Carmona =

Spanish politician (born 1973)

Ana María Cobo Carmona MP

Member of the Congress of Deputies
- Incumbent
- Assumed office 2023
- Constituency: Jaén

Personal details
- Born: 10 May 1973 (age 52) Spain
- Party: Spanish Socialist Workers' Party

Ana María Cobo Carmona (born 10 May 1973) is a Spanish politician from the Spanish Socialist Workers' Party. In the 2023 Spanish general election she was elected to the Congress of Deputies in Jaén.

== See also ==
- 15th Congress of Deputies
