= Sofía Acedo =

Spanish politician (born 1985)

Sofia Acedo
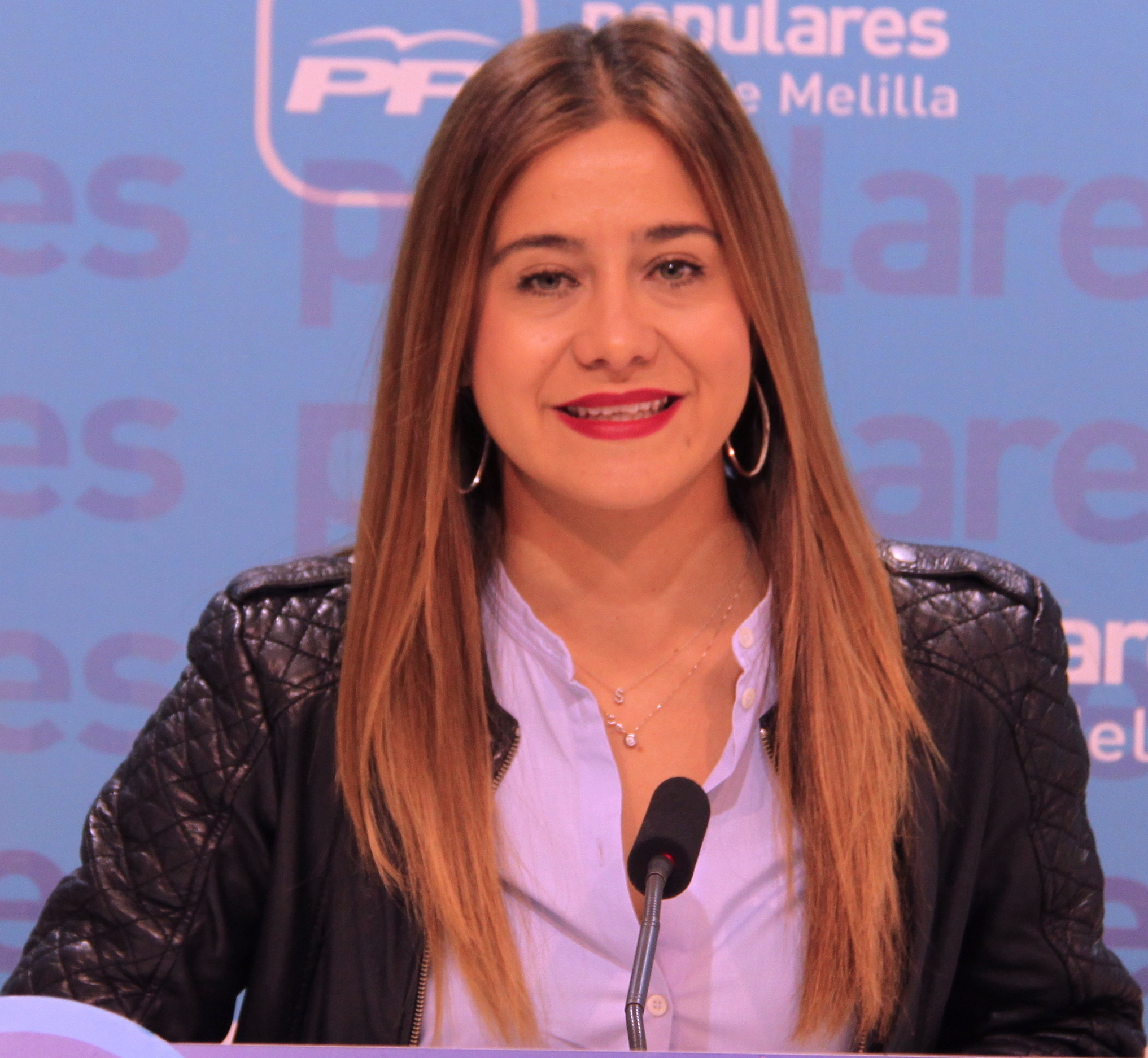

Member of the Senate
- In office 14 January 2016 – 16 August 2023
- Constituency: Melilla

Member of the Congress of Deputies
- Incumbent
- Assumed office 17 August 2023
- Constituency: Melilla

Personal details
- Born: Sofia Acedo Reyes; 24 September 1985 (age 41) Melilla, Spain
- Party: People's Party

Sofía Acedo Reyes (born 24 September 1985) is a Spanish politician. She was the senator representing Melilla in the senate of Spain from 2016 to 2023.

She was elected to the 15th Congress of Deputies from Melilla in the 2023 Spanish general election.

== Biography ==
Acedo was born on 24 September 1985 in Melilla. She later relocated to Granada for her university education where she studied and graduated in Sociology. During the 2008 elections, she was on the list of candidates to the Senate under the People's Party (PP). In 2011, she was introduced as number 3 of the People's Party in the regional elections, being elected as a deputy in the Assembly of Melilla. On 20 December 2015 Reyes was elected senator representing Melilla.

After her first term, on 10 November 2019, she was re-elected senator for Melilla, winning with over 8,912 votes compared to the 8,860 votes obtained by Dunia Al-Mansouri Umpierrez of the Coalition for Melilla.
