= Isabel María Pérez Ortiz =

Spanish politician (born 1972)

Isabel María Pérez Ortiz MP

Member of the Congress of Deputies
- Incumbent
- Assumed office 2023
- Constituency: Málaga

Personal details
- Born: 12 March 1972 (age 54) Marbella, Spain
- Party: Spanish Socialist Workers' Party

Isabel María Pérez Ortiz (born 12 March 1972) is a Spanish politician from the Spanish Socialist Workers' Party. In the 2023 Spanish general election she was elected to the Congress of Deputies in Málaga.

== See also ==
- 15th Congress of Deputies
