= Carmen Fúnez =

Spanish politician (born 1975)

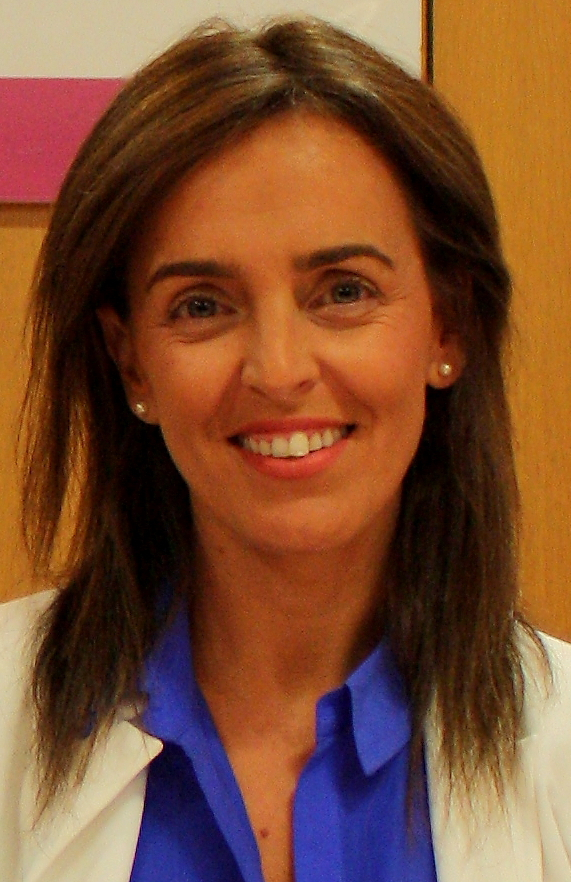

Member of the Senate
- In office 2 April 2004 – 26 October 2015
- Constituency: Ciudad Real

Personal details
- Born: 20 October 1975 (age 50)
- Party: People's Party

María del Carmen Fúnez de Gregorio (born 20 October 1975) is a Spanish politician. From 2004 to 2015, she was a member of the Senate. From 1999 to 2004, she was a member of the Cortes of Castilla–La Mancha. From 2001 to 2006, she served as president of the New Generations of the People's Party.
