= Patricia Rueda Perello =

Spanish businesswoman and politician

Patricia Rueda Perelló MP
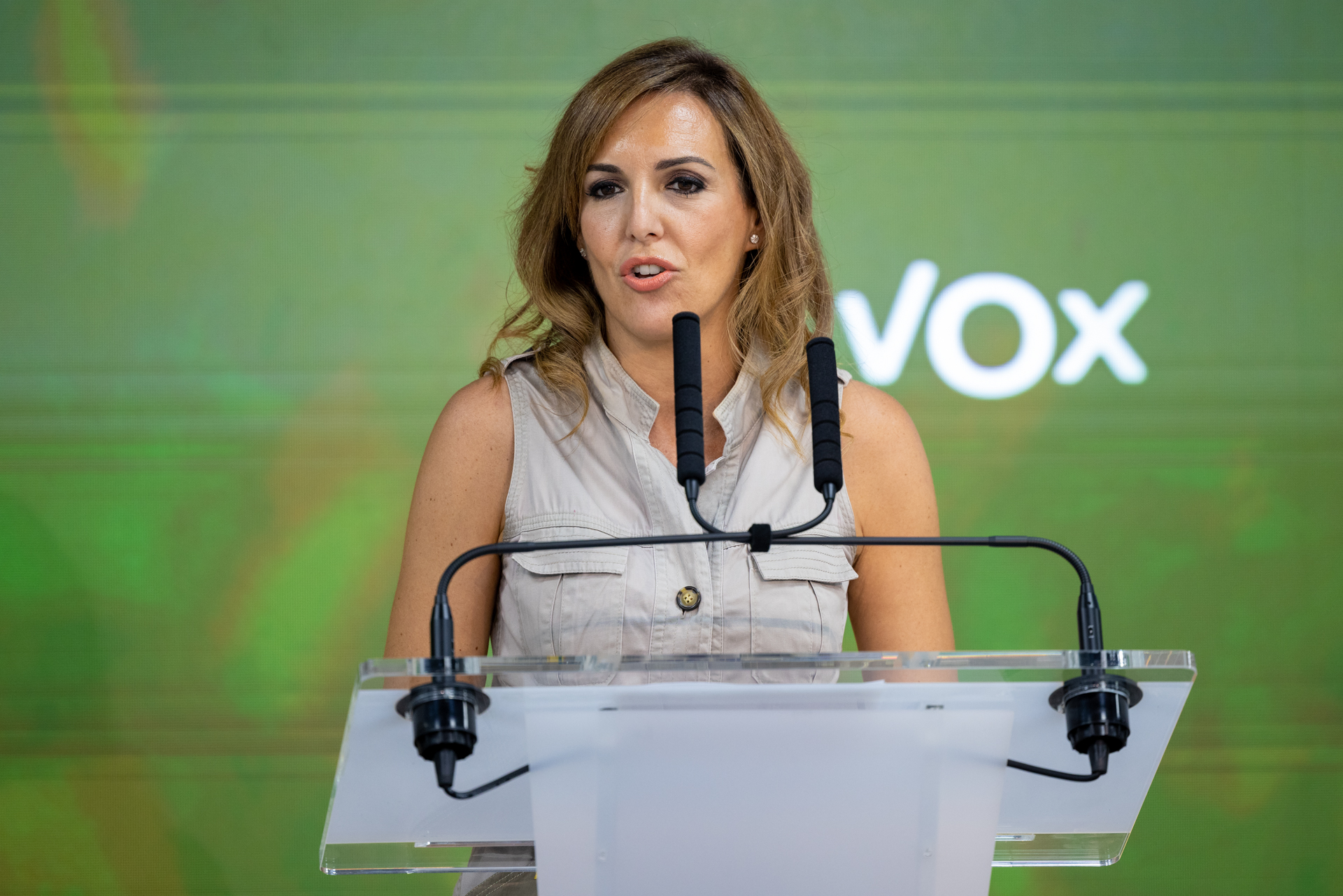
- Patricia Rueda Perelló in 2019

Member of the Congress of Deputies
- Incumbent
- Assumed office 21 May 2019
- Constituency: Málaga

Personal details
- Born: 20 October 1976 (age 49) Málaga, Kingdom of Spain
- Party: Vox
- Education: University of Málaga

Patricia Rueda Perelló (born 20 October 1976) is a Spanish businesswoman and politician who is a member of the Congress of Deputies for the Vox.

== Biography ==
Rueda Perelló studied and degreed in child education than took a career in advertising and public relations at the University of Málaga. After worked as a commercial director of various businesses, during this time she get her master in MBA executive including as a corporate manager for the Cropani Palace and was the director of the Automobile and Fashion Museum in Malaga.

== Political career ==
Rueda Perelló first joined Vox in 2016. In the April 2019 Spanish general election, she stood as a candidate for Vox and was elected to the Congress of Deputies for the Malaga constituency. She was re-elected in November 2019.
