= Beatriz Jiménez Linuesa =

Spanish politician (born 1985)

Beatriz Jiménez Linuesa (born 26 May 1985) is a Spanish politician, member of the Congress of Deputies since 2019.

She had been member of Cortes of Castilla–La Mancha between 2011 and 2015 and city councilor of Cuenca between 2012 and 2015. On 13 March 2020 she announced via Twitter that she had been infected with SARS-CoV-2 during the ongoing coronavirus pandemic.
