= Sandra Pascual =

Spanish politician (born 1992)

Member of the Congress of Deputies
- Incumbent
- Assumed office 17 August 2023
- Constituency: Alicante

Personal details
- Born: 31 May 1992 (age 33)
- Party: People's Party (since 2012)

Sandra Pascual Rocamora (born 31 May 1992) is a Spanish politician serving as a member of the Congress of Deputies since 2023. She previously worked as an accountant and auditor.
