= Cristina Teniente =

Spanish politician (born 1967)

Member of the Congress of Deputies
- Incumbent
- Assumed office 17 August 2023
- Constituency: Cáceres

Personal details
- Born: 9 May 1967 (age 58)
- Party: People's Party

Cristina Elena Teniente Sánchez (born 9 May 1967) is a Spanish politician serving as a member of the Congress of Deputies since 2023. From 2003 to 2023, she was a member of the Assembly of Extremadura.
