= Marta Trenzano =

Spanish politician (born 1983)

Member of the Congress of Deputies
- Incumbent
- Assumed office 17 August 2023
- Constituency: Valencia

Personal details
- Born: 26 December 1983 (age 42)
- Party: Socialist Party of the Valencian Country

Marta Trenzano Rubio (born 26 December 1983) is a Spanish politician serving as a member of the Congress of Deputies since 2023. From 2015 to 2023, she served as mayor of Algemesí.
