= Alicia Álvarez =

Spanish politician (born 1981)

Member of the Congress of Deputies
- Incumbent
- Assumed office 17 August 2023
- Constituency: Santa Cruz de Tenerife

Personal details
- Born: 25 August 1981 (age 44)
- Party: Spanish Socialist Workers' Party

Alicia Álvarez González (born 25 August 1981) is a Spanish politician serving as a member of the Congress of Deputies since 2023. From February to June 2023, she served as deputy minister of public administration and transparency of the Canary Islands.
