= Pablo Vázquez Vega =

Spanish politician (1965–2026)

Member of the Congress of Deputies for Madrid
- In office 17 August 2023 – 19 January 2024

Personal details
- Born: 16 December 1965 Cáceres, Spain
- Died: 3 August 2026 (aged 60) Madrid, Spain
- Party: PP
- Education: Complutense University of Madrid
- Occupation: Economist

Pablo Vázquez Vega (16 December 1965 – 3 August 2026) was a Spanish politician. A member of the People's Party, he served in the Congress of Deputies from 2023 to 2024.

Vázquez died in Madrid on 3 August 2026, at the age of 60.
