= Raquel Clemente =

Spanish politician (born 1982)

Member of the Congress of Deputies
- Incumbent
- Assumed office 27 July 2023
- Constituency: Teruel

Member of the Senate
- In office 13 January 2016 – 4 March 2019
- Constituency: Teruel

Personal details
- Born: 30 April 1982 (age 44)
- Party: People's Party

Raquel Clemente Muñoz (born 30 April 1982) is a Spanish politician serving as a member of the Congress of Deputies since 2023. She has served as mayor of Celadas since 2011. From 2016 to 2019, she was a member of the Senate.
