= David García Gomis =

Spanish politician (born 1980)

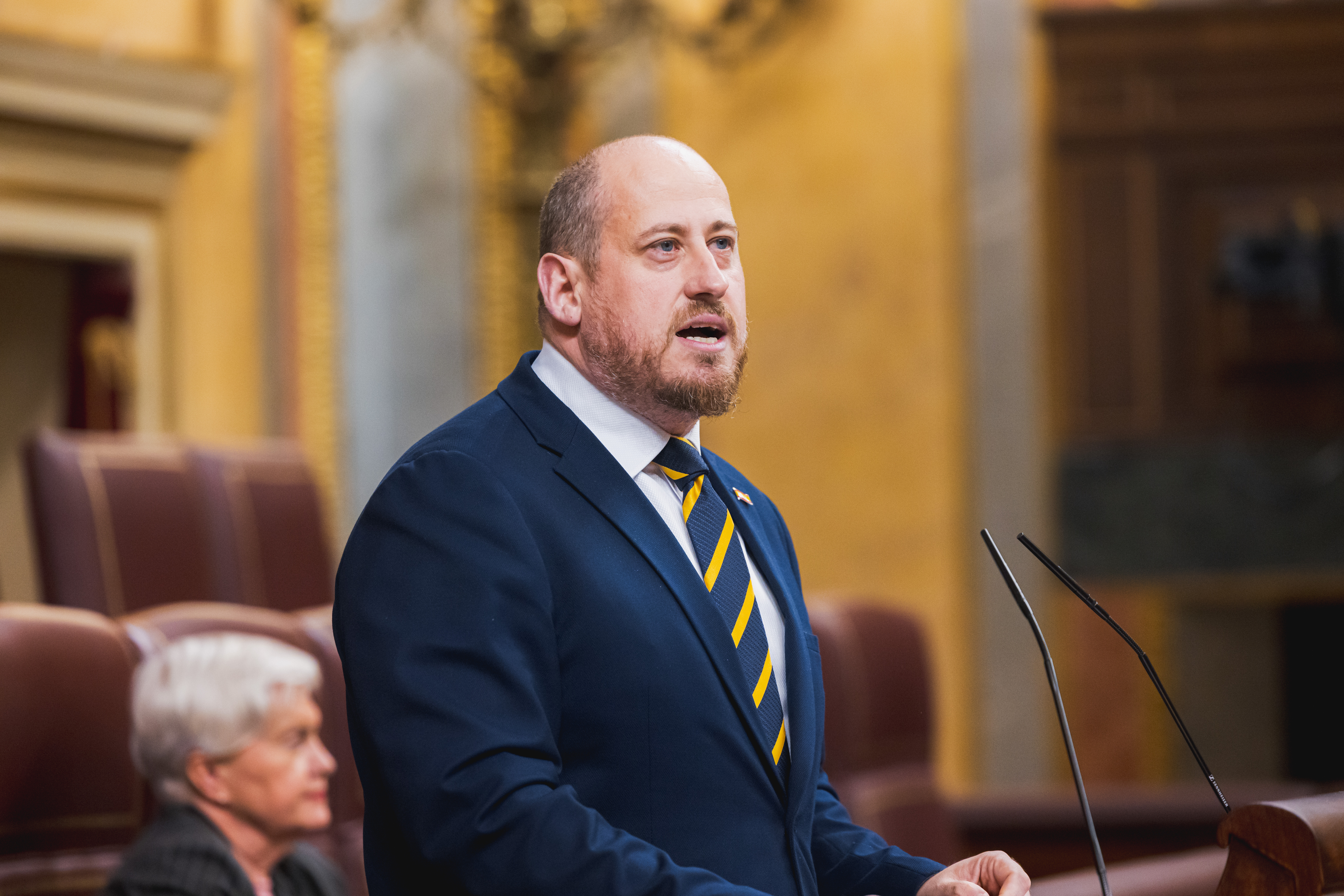
- García in 2024

Member of the Congress of Deputies
- Incumbent
- Assumed office 17 August 2023
- Constituency: Alicante

Personal details
- Born: 15 October 1980 (age 45)
- Party: Vox

David García Gomis (born 15 October 1980) is a Spanish politician serving as a member of the Congress of Deputies since 2023. From 2019 to 2023, he was a member of the Corts Valencianes.
