= Luis Rey (politician) =

Spanish politician (born 1967)

Member of the Congress of Deputies
- Incumbent
- Assumed office 17 August 2023
- Constituency: Soria

Member of the Senate
- In office 28 September 2021 – 29 May 2023
- Preceded by: Pilar Delgado
- Constituency: Soria

Personal details
- Born: 5 March 1967 (age 59)
- Party: Spanish Socialist Workers' Party

Luis Alfonso Rey de las Heras (born 5 March 1967) is a Spanish politician serving as a member of the Congress of Deputies since 2023. From 2021 to 2023, he was a member of the Senate.
