= Alpera =

Coordinates: 38°58′N 1°13′W

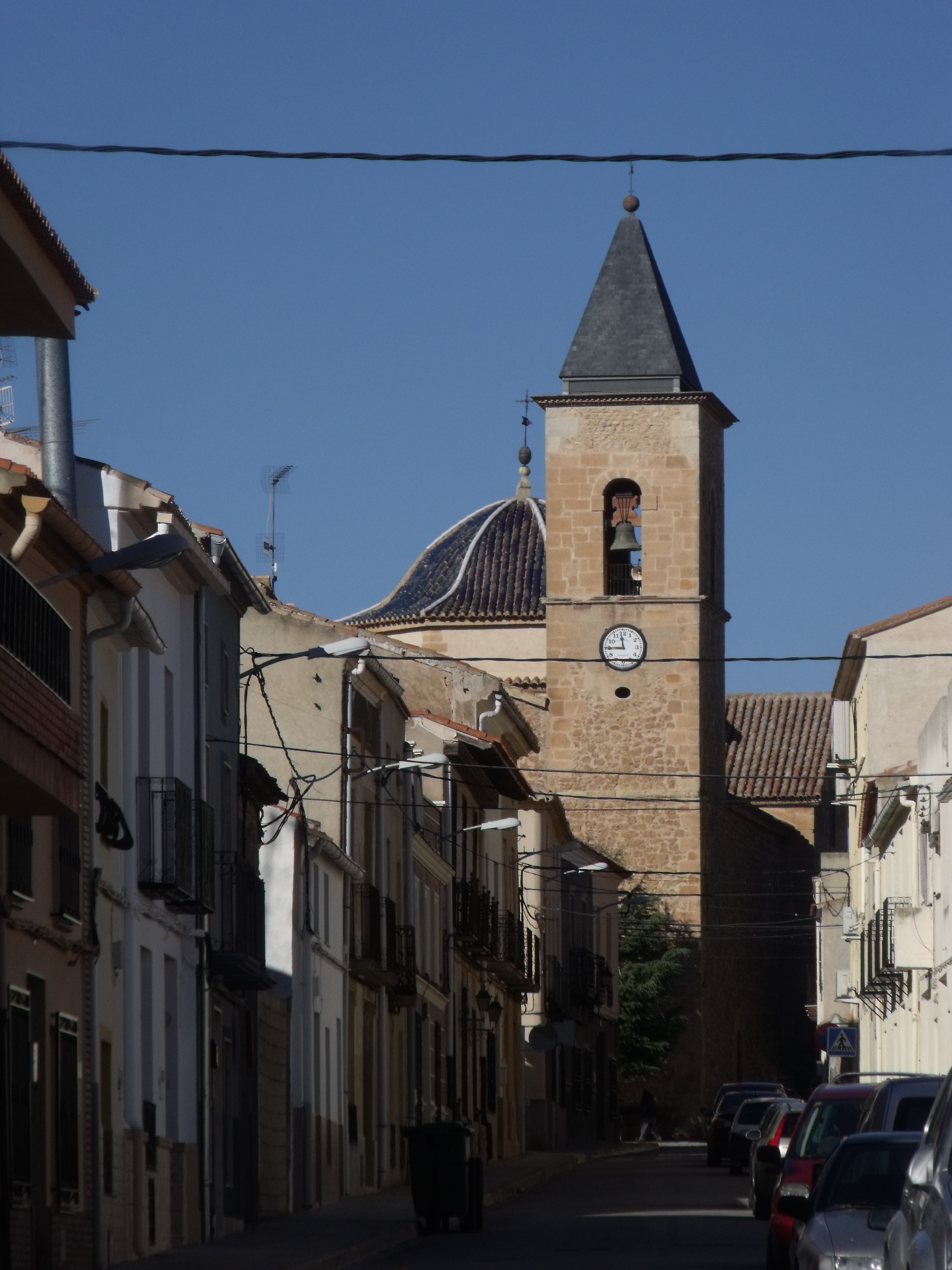

Coat of arms of Alpera

Alpera is a municipality in Albacete, Castile-La Mancha, Spain with a rich history of wine making. It has a population of 2,278 as of 2025.
