= Pedro Navarro (politician) =

Spanish politician (born 1977)

Member of the Congress of Deputies
- Incumbent
- Assumed office 3 December 2019
- Constituency: Zaragoza

Personal details
- Born: 16 June 1977 (age 48)
- Party: People's Party

Pedro Navarro López (born 16 June 1977) is a Spanish politician serving as a member of the Congress of Deputies since 2019. From 2007 to 2011, he was a member of the Cortes of Aragon. From 2011 to 2019, he was a city councillor of Zaragoza.
