= Carlos Hernández Quero =

Spanish politician (born 1990)

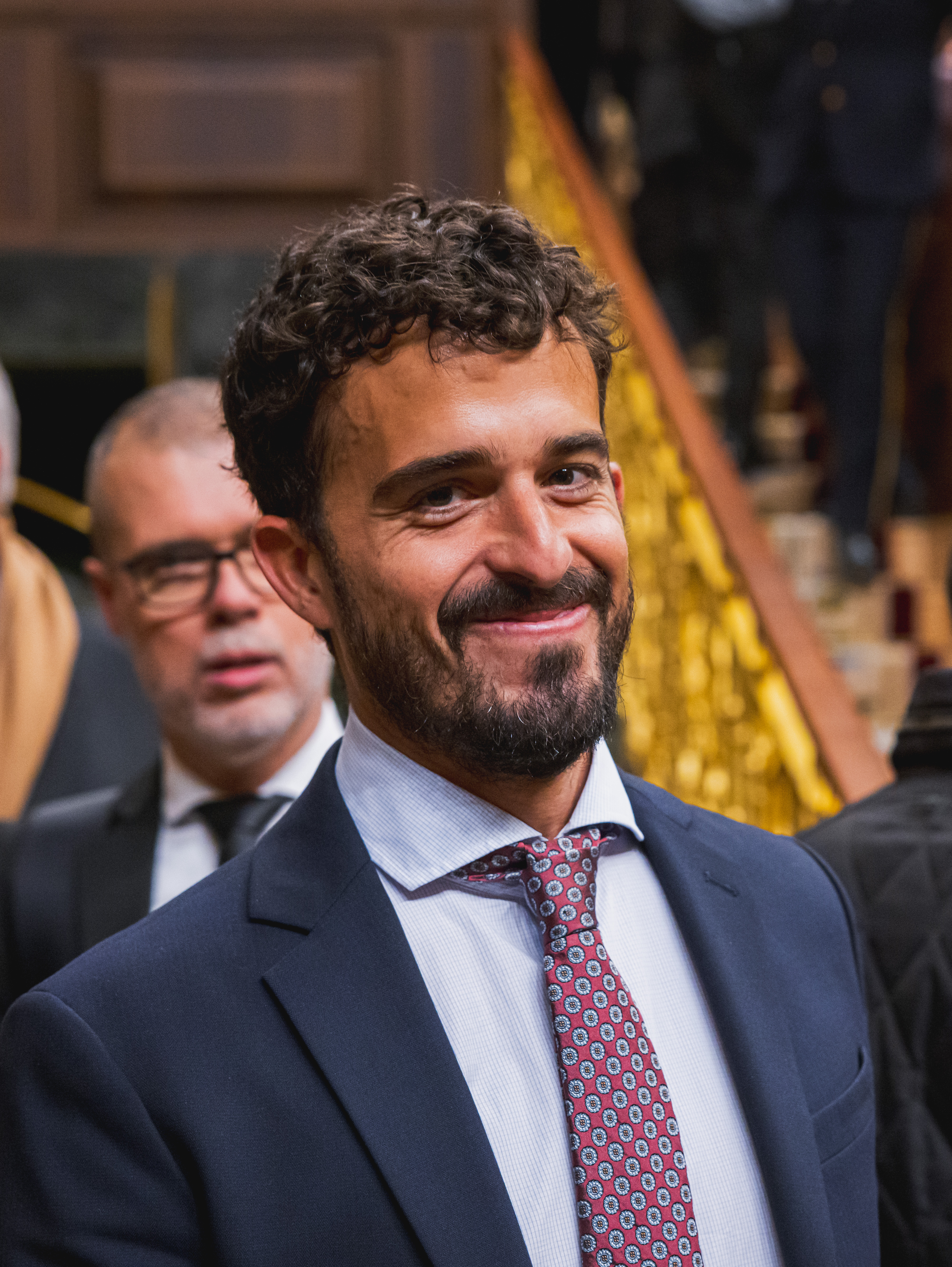

Member of the Congress of Deputies
- Incumbent
- Assumed office 17 August 2023
- Constituency: Málaga

Personal details
- Born: 28 December 1990 (age 35)
- Party: Vox

Carlos Hernández Quero (born 28 December 1990) is a Spanish politician serving as a member of the Congress of Deputies since 2023. He has been a member of the executive committee of Vox since 2025.
