= Amador Marqués =

Spanish politician (born 1984)

Member of the Congress of Deputies
- Incumbent
- Assumed office 17 August 2023
- Constituency: Lleida

Personal details
- Born: 23 September 1984 (age 41)
- Party: Unity of Aran

Amador Marqués Atés (born 23 September 1984) is a Spanish politician serving as a member of the Congress of Deputies since 2023. From 2015 to 2023, he served as mayor of Bossòst.
