= Carlos Martín Urriza =

Spanish politician (born 1968)

Member of the Congress of Deputies
- Incumbent
- Assumed office 17 August 2023
- Constituency: Madrid

Personal details
- Born: 10 August 1968 (age 57)
- Party: Sumar

Carlos Martín Urriza (born 10 August 1968) is a Spanish politician serving as a member of the Congress of Deputies since 2023. He has served as chairman of the budget committee since 2023.
