= María Adrio Taracido =

Spanish politician

María Adrio Taracido (born 12 December, 1956 in Pontevedra, Spain) is a Spanish politician, lawyer and senator. She is the senator representing Pontevedra under the Spanish Socialist Workers' Party. She was elected into office 28 April 2019 during the general elections of Spain. She is a member of the Spanish senate committee on Constitutional Commission and she is the Spokesperson for the Petitions Committee in the senate.
