= Noelia Núñez =

Spanish politician (born 1992)

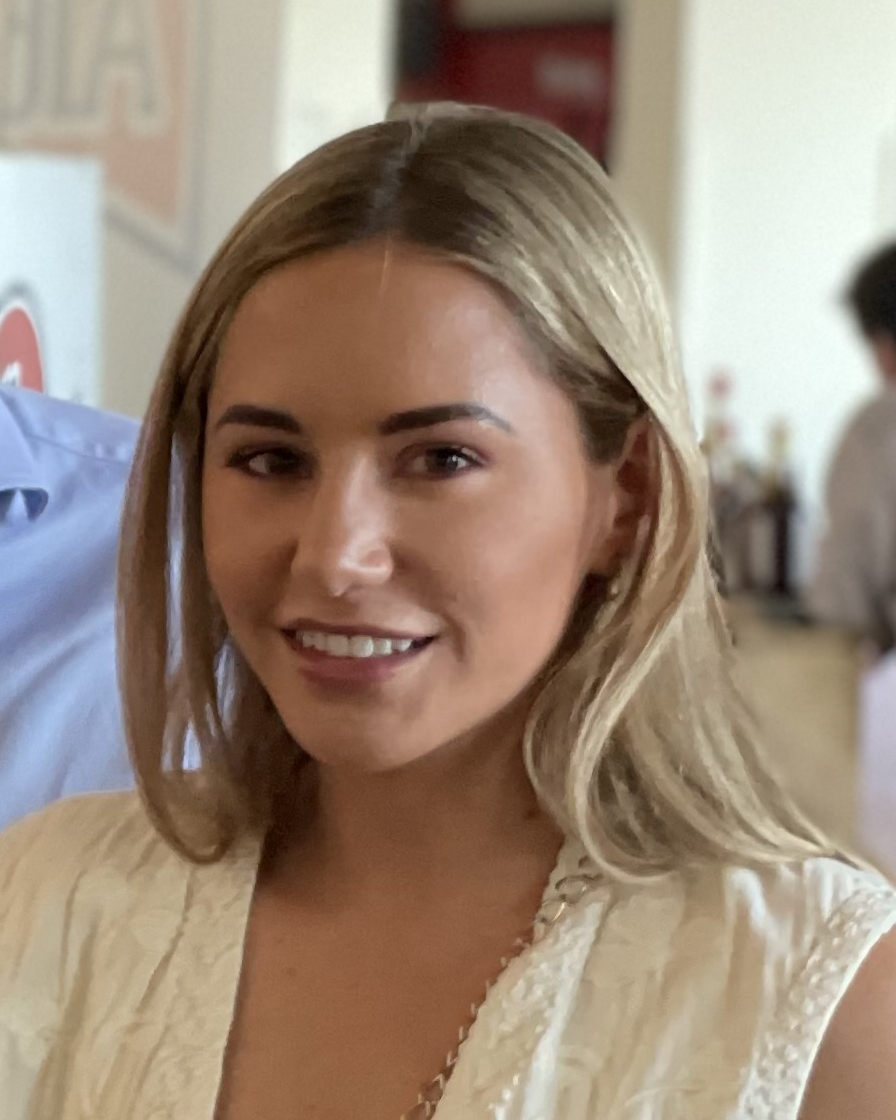
- Núñez in 2023

Member of the Congress of Deputies
- In office 17 August 2023 – 23 July 2025
- Constituency: Madrid

Personal details
- Born: 2 June 1992 (age 33)
- Party: People's Party

Noelia Núñez González (born 2 June 1992) is a Spanish politician who served as a member of the Congress of Deputies from 2023 to 2025. From 2021 to 2023, she was a member of the Assembly of Madrid.

Noelia Nuñez was the Deputy Secretary for Mobilization and Digital Challenge of the People's Party.

On 23 July 2025 she resigned from all her political positions following the controversy that arose regarding her academic titles, which were found to be false.
