= Carla Toscano de Balbín =

Spanish politician (born 1977)

Carla Toscano de Balbín MP
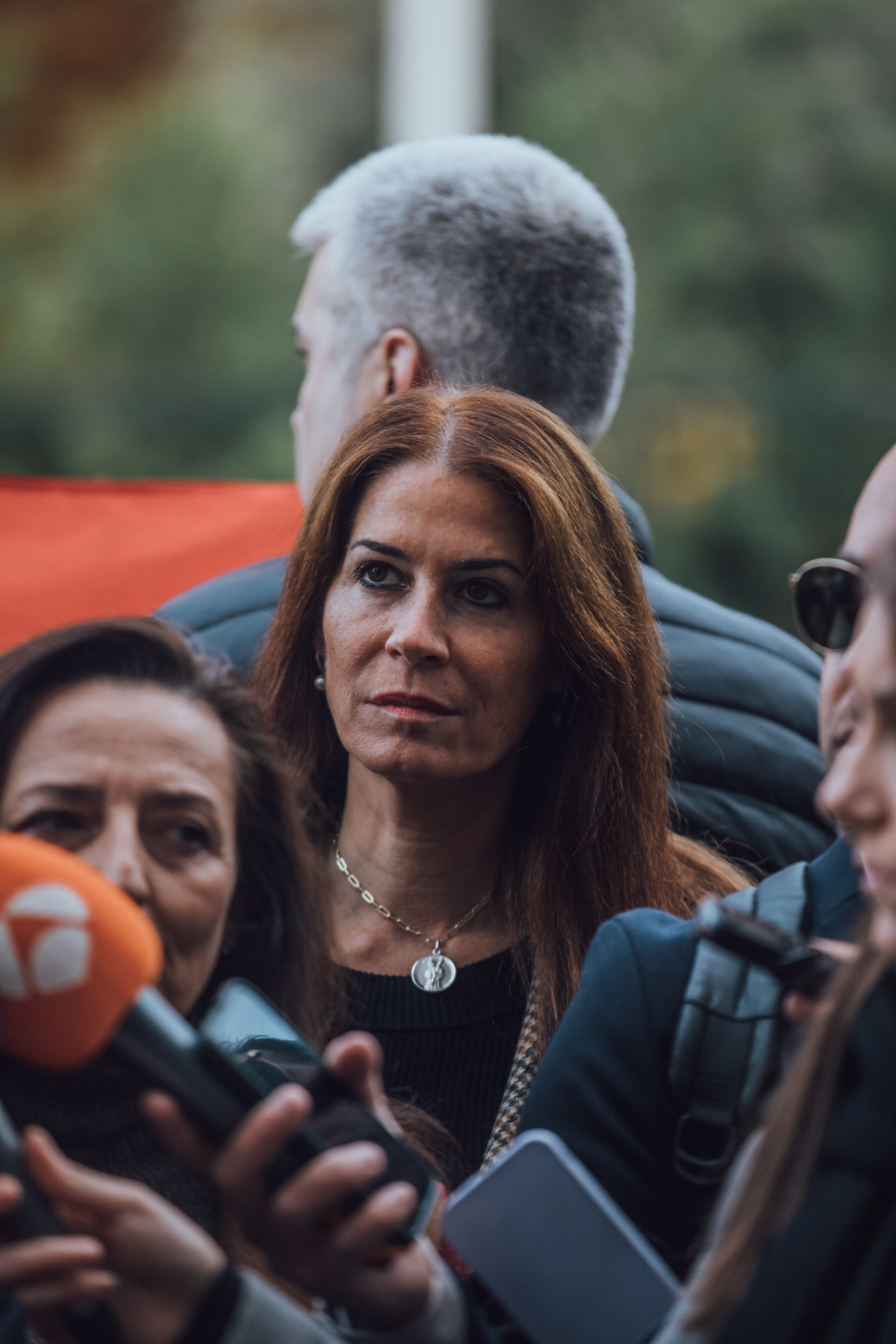

Member of the Congress of Deputies
- In office 21 May 2019 – 10 January 2024
- Constituency: Madrid

Personal details
- Born: 14 November 1977 (age 48) Madrid, Spain
- Party: Vox
- Education: Complutense University of Madrid

Carla Toscano de Balbín (born 14 November 1977 in Madrid) is a Spanish politician and a member of the Congress of Deputies for Vox from 21 May 2019 until 10 January 2024, the day she resigned from the position.

== Biography ==
Balbín was born and raised in Madrid. She attended the Complutense University of Madrid where she studied for a degree in law followed by a master's degree in linguistics. She then worked in the field of humanitarian aid before entering politics.

During the April 2019 Spanish general election, Balbín was elected to the Congress of Deputies for the Madrid constituency. She was re-elected in the general election of November 2019. Politically, she has framed her beliefs as " family, freedom, patriotism." Within Vox, she has served as the party's spokeswoman on gender issues and equality. In this role, she has denounced the Spanish gender violence law and feminism, and has likened so-called positive discrimination(the act of intentionally favoring a racial minority over a racial majority) to Marxism. She has also called on the Spanish government to scrap the gender violence law, arguing "violence has no sex" and claims the law enables false accusations against men. Along with other Vox politicians, she supports abolishing Spain's autonomous communities and calls for the recentralization of the country.
