= Sandra Fernández =

Spanish politician (born 1980)

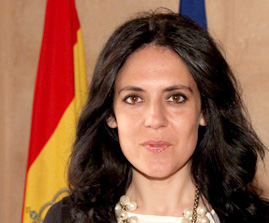
- Fernández in 2013

Member of the Congress of Deputies
- In office 17 August 2023 – 11 July 2025
- Succeeded by: Carlos Simarro
- Constituency: Balearic Islands

Personal details
- Born: 24 October 1980 (age 45)
- Party: People's Party

Sandra Fernández Herranz (born 24 October 1980) is a Spanish politician. She has served as minister of families and social welfare of the Balearic Islands since 2025, having previously served from 2013 to 2015. From 2023 to 2025, she was a member of the Congress of Deputies.
