= Alberto Mayoral =

Spanish politician (born 1984)

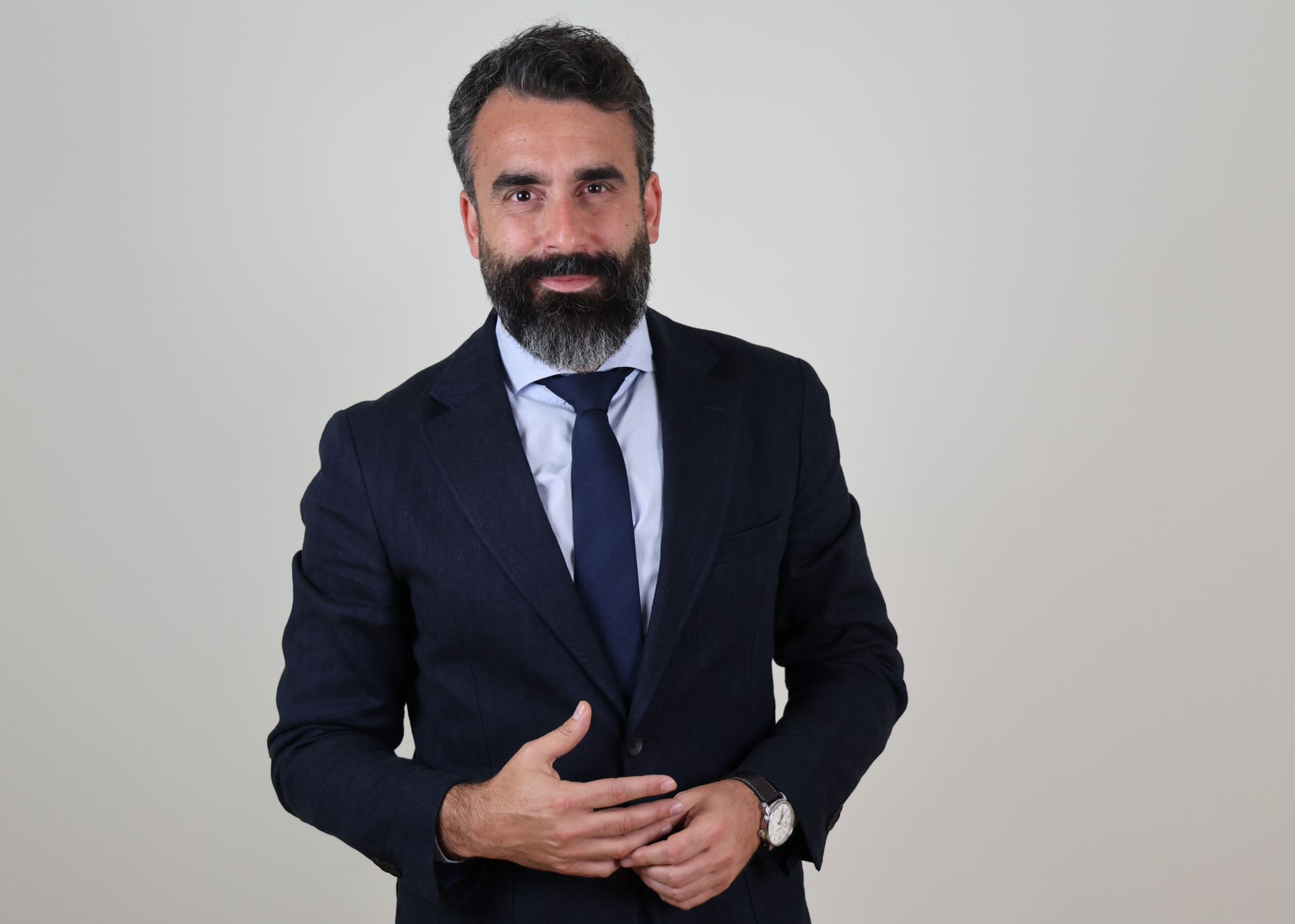
- Mayoral in 2025

Member of the Congress of Deputies
- Incumbent
- Assumed office 12 December 2023
- Preceded by: Luis Planas
- Constituency: Córdoba

Personal details
- Born: 19 December 1984 (age 41)
- Party: Spanish Socialist Workers' Party

Alberto Mayoral de Lamo (born 19 December 1984) is a Spanish politician serving as a member of the Congress of Deputies since 2023. He has served as spokesperson for inclusion and social security of the Spanish Socialist Workers' Party group in the Congress since 2024.
