= Oriol Almirón Ruiz =

Spanish politician (born 2000)

Member of the Congress of Deputies
- Incumbent
- Assumed office 10 September 2024
- Preceded by: Teresa Llorens Carbonell
- Constituency: Barcelona

Personal details
- Born: 19 May 2000 (age 25)
- Party: Socialists' Party of Catalonia

Oriol Almirón Ruiz (born 19 May 2000) is a Spanish politician serving as a member of the Congress of Deputies since 2024. He has been a municipal councillor of Òdena since 2019.
