= Daniel Pérez Osma =

Spanish politician (born 1989)

Member of the Congress of Deputies
- Incumbent
- Assumed office 17 August 2023
- Constituency: Cuenca

Personal details
- Born: 18 September 1989 (age 36)
- Party: People's Party

Daniel Pérez Osma (born 18 September 1989) is a Spanish politician serving as a member of the Congress of Deputies since 2023. He has served as mayor of Las Valeras since 2013.
