= Pepe Mercadal =

Spanish politician (born 1994)

Member of the Congress of Deputies
- Incumbent
- Assumed office 17 August 2023
- Constituency: Balearic Islands

Personal details
- Born: 7 October 1994 (age 31)
- Party: Spanish Socialist Workers' Party
- Parent: Elena Baquero González (mother)

Josep Mercadal Baquero (born 7 October 1994) is a Spanish politician serving as a member of the Congress of Deputies since 2023. He is the son of Elena Baquero.
