= Ana María Martínez Labella =

Spanish politician

Ana María Martínez Labella MP

Member of the Congress of Deputies
- Incumbent
- Assumed office 23 July 2023
- Constituency: Almería

Personal details
- Born: Spain
- Party: People's Party (Spain)

Ana María Martínez Labella is a Spanish politician from the People's Party. She was elected to the Congress of Deputies in the 2023 Spanish general election.

She was a member of Almería City Council for 26 years.

== See also ==
- 15th Congress of Deputies
