= Ferran Verdejo Vicente =

Spanish politician (born 1997)

Member of the Congress of Deputies
- Incumbent
- Assumed office 17 August 2023
- Constituency: Barcelona

Personal details
- Born: 24 January 1997 (age 29)
- Party: Socialists' Party of Catalonia

Ferran Verdejo Vicente (born 24 January 1997) is a Spanish politician serving as a member of the Congress of Deputies since 2023. He is the spokesperson of the Socialists' Party of Catalonia in the city council of Cardona.
