= Lázaro Azorín =

Spanish politician (born 1975)

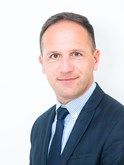
- Azorín in 2022

Member of the Congress of Deputies
- Incumbent
- Assumed office 25 February 2020
- Preceded by: Pedro Duque
- Constituency: Alicante

Personal details
- Born: 9 April 1975 (age 51)
- Party: Spanish Socialist Workers' Party

Lázaro Azorín Salar (born 9 April 1975) is a Spanish politician serving as a member of the Congress of Deputies since 2020. From 2011 to 2025, he served as mayor of Pinoso / El Pinós.
