= Bella Verano =

Spanish politician (born 1978)

Member of the Congress of Deputies
- Incumbent
- Assumed office 17 August 2023
- Constituency: Huelva

Personal details
- Born: 14 February 1978 (age 48)
- Party: People's Party

Bella Verano Domínguez (born 14 February 1978) is a Spanish politician serving as a member of the Congress of Deputies since 2023. From 2019 to 2023, she served as delegate of the regional government of Andalusia in the province of Huelva.
