= Esther Llamazares =

Spanish politician (born 1970)

Member of the Congress of Deputies
- Incumbent
- Assumed office 17 August 2023
- Constituency: Asturias

Personal details
- Born: 6 November 1970 (age 55)
- Party: People's Party

María Esther Llamazares Domingo (born 6 November 1970) is a Spanish politician serving as a member of the Congress of Deputies since 2023. She has served as group leader of the People's Party in the city council of Avilés since 2019.
