= Blanca Armario =

Spanish politician (born 1980)

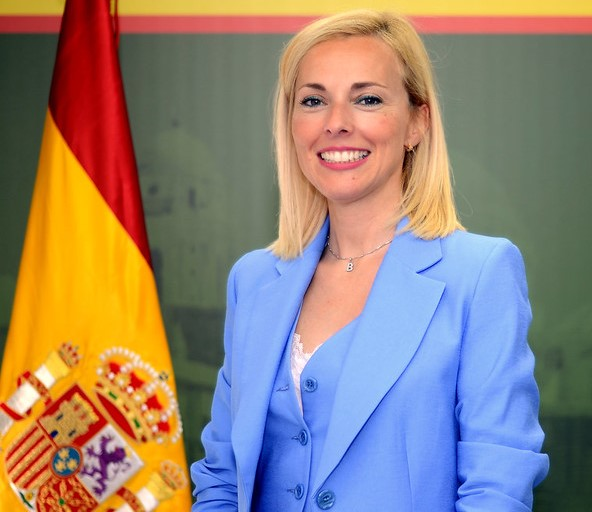
- Armario in 2022

Member of the Congress of Deputies
- Incumbent
- Assumed office 17 August 2023
- Constituency: Cádiz

Personal details
- Born: 1 March 1980 (age 46)
- Party: Vox

Blanca Armario González (born 1 March 1980) is a Spanish politician serving as a member of the Congress of Deputies since 2023. From 2022 to 2023, she was a member of the Parliament of Andalusia.
