= Ignacio Hoces Íñiguez =

Spanish politician (born 1983)

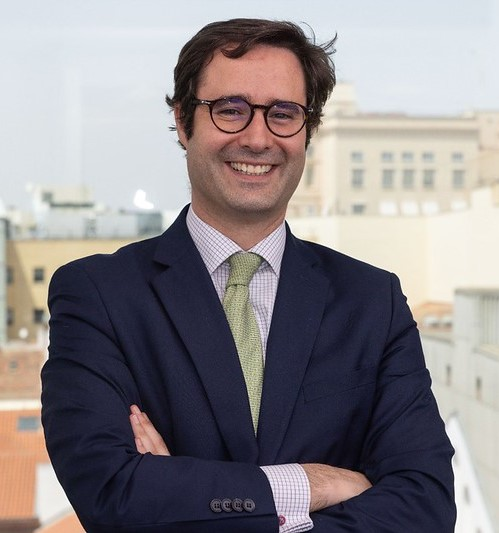
- Hoces in 2023

Member of the Congress of Deputies
- Incumbent
- Assumed office 17 August 2023
- Constituency: Badajoz

Personal details
- Born: 30 December 1983 (age 42)
- Party: Vox

Ignacio Hoces Íñiguez (born 30 December 1983) is a Spanish historian and politician serving as a member of the Congress of Deputies since 2023. From 2011 to 2021, he served as head of the legal department of the Economic and Social Council.
