= Ainhoa Molina =

Spanish politician (born 1997)

Member of the Congress of Deputies
- Incumbent
- Assumed office 17 September 2024
- Preceded by: Asier Antona Gómez
- Constituency: Santa Cruz de Tenerife

Personal details
- Born: 18 August 1997 (age 28)
- Party: People's Party

Ainhoa Molina León (born 18 August 1997) is a Spanish politician serving as a member of the Congress of Deputies since 2024. She succeeded Asier Antona Gómez upon his resignation.
