= Ignacio Romaní Cantera =

Spanish politician

Ignacio Romaní Cantera MP

Member of the Congress of Deputies
- Incumbent
- Assumed office 25 August 2022
- Preceded by: María José García-Pelayo Jurado
- Constituency: Cádiz

Personal details
- Born: Spain
- Party: People's Party (Spain)

José Ignacio Romaní Cantera is a Spanish politician from the People's Party.

== See also ==
- 15th Congress of Deputies
