= Javier Alfonso Cendón =

Spanish engineer and trade unionist (born 1983)

Deputy Spokesperson of the Socialist Parliamentary Group in the Congress of Deputies
- Incumbent
- Assumed office 14 September 2023
- President: Cristina Narbona
- Constituency: Patxi López

Deputy in the General Courts
- Incumbent
- Assumed office 21 May 2019
- Constituency: León

Personal details
- Born: León Spain

Javier Alfonso Cendón (León, 21 October 1983) is a computer engineer, professor, politician, and trade unionist from Spain. He has served as a deputy in the Congress of Deputies since 2019.

== Biography ==
=== Education and academic career ===
From a Bercian family, he is the nephew of the former mayor of Fabero Demetrio Alfonso Canedo. He earned a degree in computer engineering from the University of León (2005) and from Central Connecticut State University (New Britain, Connecticut). He completed his academic training with a degree in Market Research and Techniques, and three master's degrees: an MBA from the Polytechnic University of Madrid and two others in Renewable Energies and Cybersecurity, both from the University of León. He later worked as an associate professor in the Engineering Projects Department at the University of León (2016). He has also been a professor at the University of Xiangtan (China).

=== Union and political activity ===
A member of the socialist trade union UGT, he was the youth head of UGT in Castile and León (until 2018) and was part of the youth leadership of the European Trade Union Confederation. A member of the PSOE, he was responsible for local group participation in León (2012–2016) and has been provincial secretary general of León (since late 2017). He led the PSOE list for the Congress of Deputies from León in the 2019 general elections.

=== Mediator Case ===
Javier Alfonso announced that he would take legal action against media outlets that identify him as one of the socialist deputies who attended parties with Tito Berni involving cocaine and prostitutes, insisting that he did not attend any dinner with him. In 2024, the police stated that they could not identify the deputies who attended said dinner.

== Awards ==
- Awarded a Torres Quevedo contract (2010) to develop research, development, and innovation projects at the National Cybersecurity Institute (Incibe).
