= Jimena Delgado =

Spanish politician (born 1972)

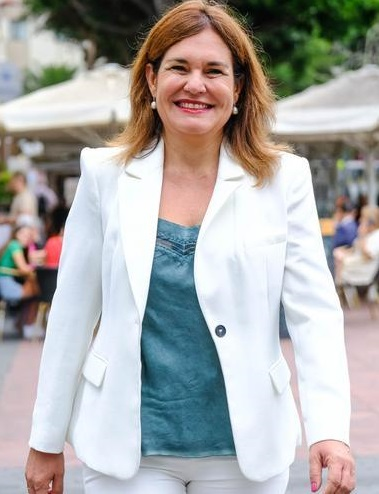
- Delgado in 2024

Member of the Congress of Deputies
- Incumbent
- Assumed office 17 August 2023
- Constituency: Las Palmas

Personal details
- Born: 9 April 1972 (age 54)
- Party: People's Party

Jimena Mercedes Delgado-Taramona Hernández (born 9 April 1972) is a Spanish politician serving as a member of the Congress of Deputies since 2023. She has served as group leader of the People's Party in the city council of Las Palmas since 2023.
