= Elisa Garrido Jiménez =

Spanish politician (born 1976)

Elisa Garrido Jiménez MP

Member of the Congress of Deputies
- Incumbent
- Assumed office 2023
- Constituency: La Rioja

Personal details
- Born: 24 April 1976 (age 50) Calahorra, Spain
- Party: Spanish Socialist Workers' Party

Elisa Garrido Jiménez (born 24 April 1976) is a Spanish politician from the Spanish Socialist Workers' Party. In the 2023 Spanish general election she was elected to the Congress of Deputies in La Rioja. She is a former mayor of Calahorra.

== See also ==
- 15th Congress of Deputies
