= Laura Lima (politician) =

Spanish politician (born 1992)

Member of the Congress of Deputies
- Incumbent
- Assumed office 17 August 2023
- Constituency: Santa Cruz de Tenerife

Personal details
- Born: 1 October 1992 (age 33)
- Party: People's Party

Laura María Lima García (born 1 October 1992) is a Spanish politician serving as a member of the Congress of Deputies since 2023. She has served as deputy secretary for organization of the People's Party of the Canary Islands since 2023.
