= Víctor Gutiérrez (water polo) =

Spanish water polo player

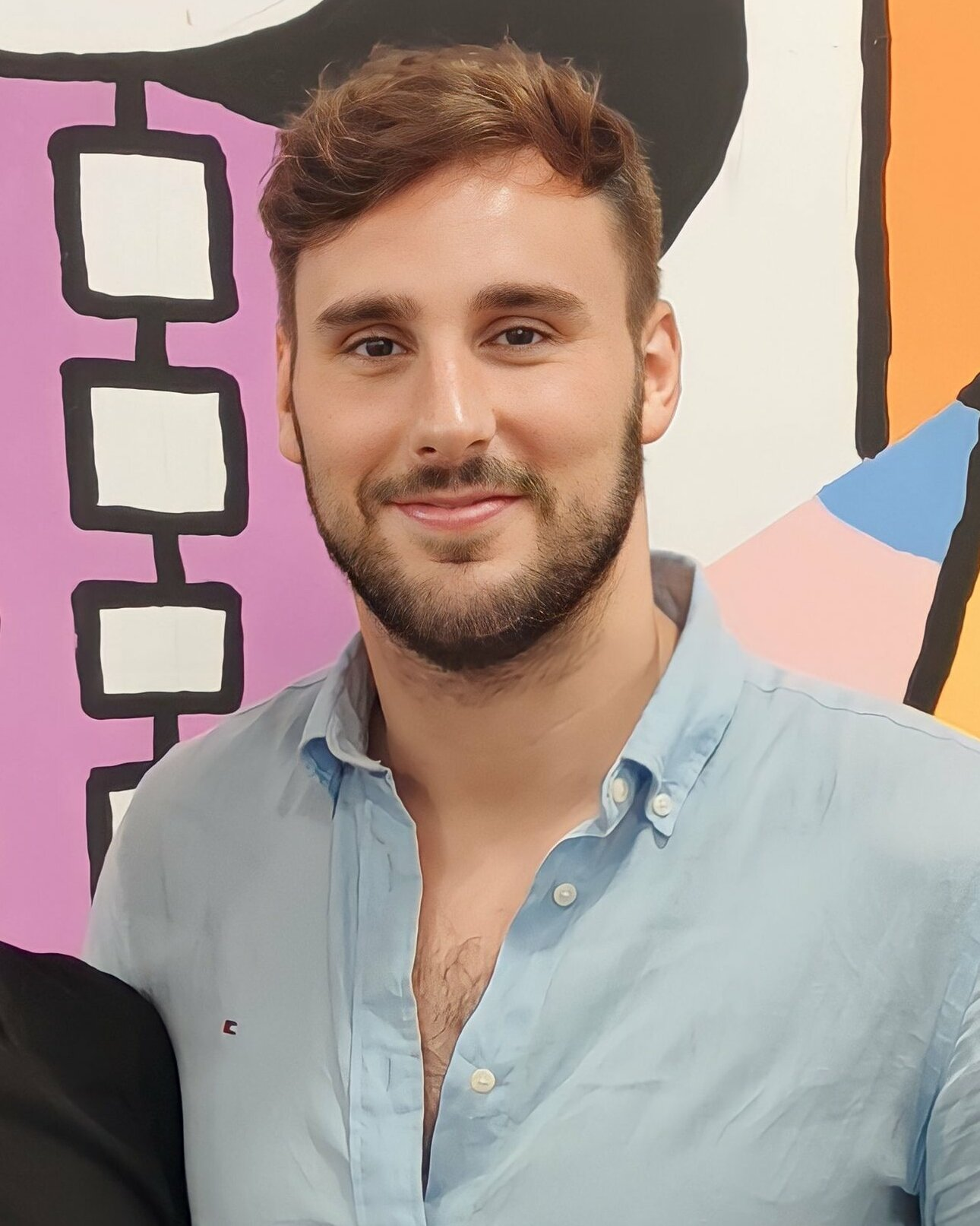
Víctor Gutiérrez

Víctor Gutiérrez Santiago (Spanish pronunciation: [ˈbiɣtoɾ ɣuˈtjereθ]; born March 6, 1991, in Madrid) is a Spanish water polo player, a member of the national team and a politician. He is member of PSOE.

He started playing water polo for the Club de Natación La Latina. At age 18, he joined the Real Canoe de Madrid team, achieving vice-championship at the la Copa del Rey in 2013.

He holds the title of European vice-champion under 18, world vice-champion under 20, and vice-champion at Copa del Rey and Supercopa de España in 2013. He has played internationally numerous times with Spain men's national water polo team and he was originally selected as a member of the Spanish Olympics team for the 2016 Summer Olympics, but was finally not part of the team.

In 2016 he came out as gay, which would have made him the only openly gay player from Spain in the Olympics that was held that year.

Since December 2023, he is member of Spanish Parliament for political party PSOE.
