= Juan Antonio Rojas Manrique =

Spanish politician (born 1983)

Member of the Congress of Deputies
- Incumbent
- Assumed office 17 August 2023
- Constituency: Santa Cruz de Tenerife

Personal details
- Born: 3 June 1983 (age 42)
- Party: People's Party

Juan Antonio Rojas Manrique (born 3 June 1983) is a Spanish politician serving as a member of the Congress of Deputies since 2023. Until 2013, he served as chairman of the New Generations of the People's Party in Tenerife.
