= Engracia Rivera =

Spanish politician (born 1971)

Member of the Congress of Deputies
- Incumbent
- Assumed office 17 August 2023
- Constituency: Seville

Personal details
- Born: 29 June 1971 (age 54)
- Party: Sumar

Engracia Rivera Arias (born 29 June 1971) is a Spanish politician serving as a member of the Congress of Deputies since 2023. She has served as chairwoman of the joint committee on the Sustainable Development Goals since 2023.
