= Alma Alfonso =

Spanish politician (born 1983)

Member of the Congress of Deputies
- Incumbent
- Assumed office 17 August 2023
- Constituency: Valencia

Personal details
- Born: 30 May 1983 (age 42)
- Party: People's Party

Alma Elvira Alfonso Silvestre (born 30 May 1983) is a Spanish politician serving as a member of the Congress of Deputies since 2023. She is the social economic spokesperson of the People's Party's parliamentary group.

== Biography ==
Alma Silvestre was born in Valencia on May 30, 1983. She studied law at the University of Valencia, where she graduated with a law degree, and obtained a master's degree from the School of Legal Practice of the Valencia Bar Association.

In her professional career, she has worked in the legal sector, standing out as a self-employed professional in the real estate sector and as a legal adviser. She has also been the director of a law firm and played an important role as director of institutional relations at Federación Nacional de Trabajadores Autónomos (the National Federation of Self-Employed Workers).

== Political career ==
She began her political career as a member of the People's Party (PP) in the Valencian Community, holding various positions within the party structure. She has served on the Valencia PP's governing and executive bodies, and has held roles including Executive Secretary for Economy, as well as Deputy Secretary for Employment, Entrepreneurship, and Infrastructure within the party.

In the 2023 Spanish general election, she was elected to the Congress of Deputies for the Valencia constituency. In the Congress, she has been active in several parliamentary committees, including the Committee on Labour, Social Economy, Inclusion, Social Security and Migration, where she has served as spokesperson since 7 December 2023. She has also sat on the Committee on Housing and Urban Agenda, the Committee on Equality, and the Committee for the Monitoring and Evaluation of the Toledo Pact agreements.

Among her notable interventions are requests for government appearances addressing issues such as protecting workers affected by the 2024 flooding in the Valencian Community and the situation of fixed-discontinuous workers. She has also served as a member of the Road Safety Committee.
