= Joaquín Martínez Salmerón =

Spanish politician (born 1970)

Member of the Congress of Deputies
- Incumbent
- Assumed office 9 May 2023
- Preceded by: Marisol Sánchez Jódar
- Constituency: Murcia

Personal details
- Born: 10 August 1970 (age 55)
- Party: Spanish Socialist Workers' Party

Joaquín Martínez Salmerón (born 10 August 1970) is a Spanish politician serving as a member of the Congress of Deputies since 2023. He has served as chairman of the justice committee since 2025.
