= Juan Diego Requena =

Spanish politician (born 1980)

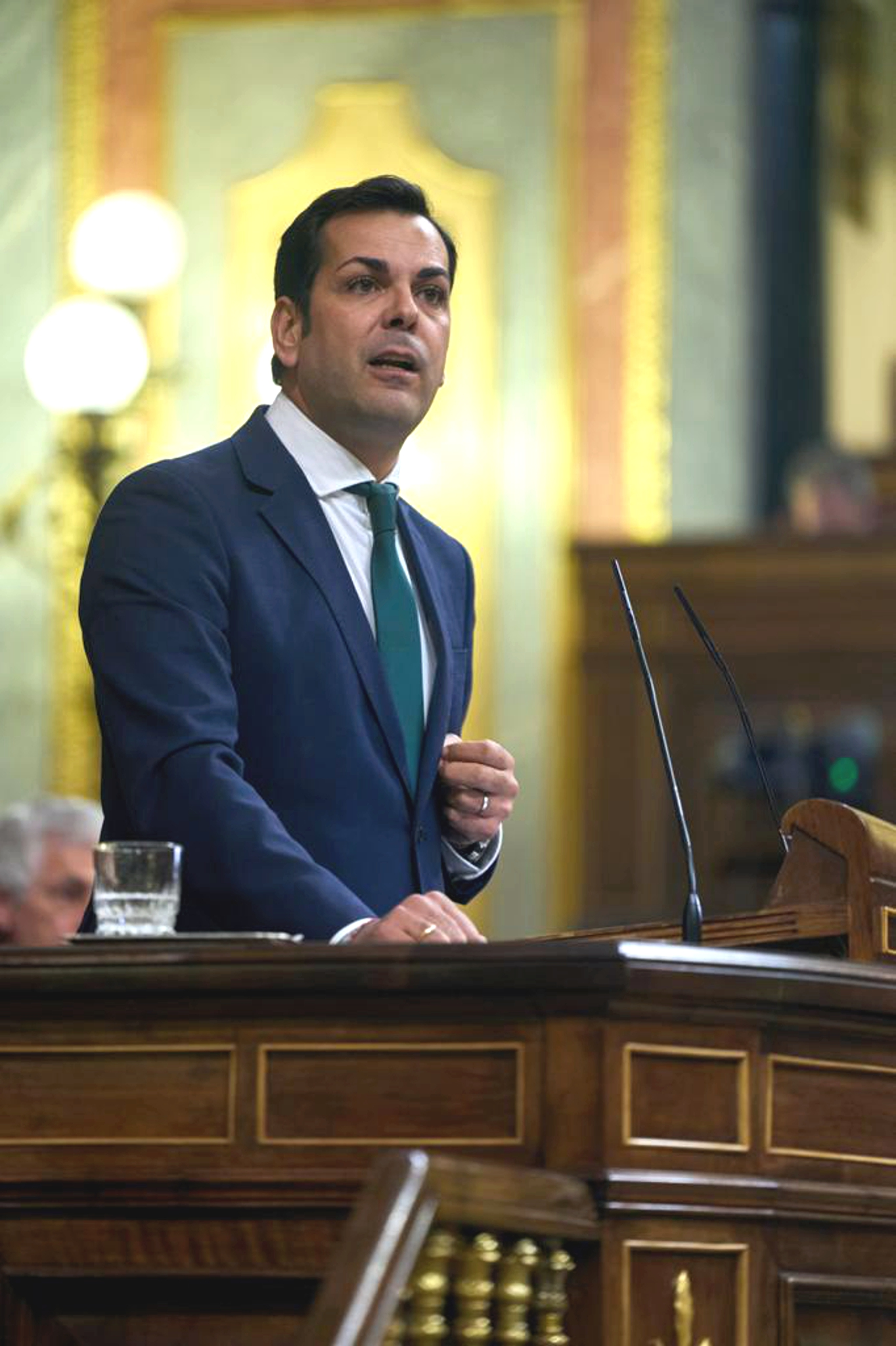
- Requena in 2023

Member of the Congress of Deputies
- Incumbent
- Assumed office 3 December 2019
- Constituency: Jaén

Personal details
- Born: 24 November 1980 (age 45)
- Party: People's Party

Juan Diego Requena Ruiz (born 24 November 1980) is a Spanish politician serving as a member of the Congress of Deputies since 2019. From 2011 to 2022, he served as mayor of Santisteban del Puerto.
