= Mirian Guardiola =

Spanish politician (born 1983)

Member of the Congress of Deputies
- Incumbent
- Assumed office 19 September 2023
- Preceded by: Luis Alberto Marín González
- Constituency: Murcia

Personal details
- Born: 27 May 1983 (age 42)
- Party: People's Party

Mirian Guardiola Salmerón (born 27 May 1983) is a Spanish politician serving as a member of the Congress of Deputies since 2023. From 2018 to 2019, she served as minister of tourism and culture of the Region of Murcia.
