= Mar Sánchez Sierra =

Spanish politician (born 1969)

Member of the Congress of Deputies
- Incumbent
- Assumed office 17 August 2023
- Constituency: Madrid

Personal details
- Born: 25 March 1969 (age 57)
- Party: People's Party

María del Mar Sánchez Sierra (born 25 March 1969) is a Spanish politician serving as a member of the Congress of Deputies since 2023. From 2013 to 2022, she served as secretary general of media of Galicia. From 2009 to 2012, she served as director general of communication of Galicia.
