= Pedro Puy Fraga =

Spanish politician (born 1962)

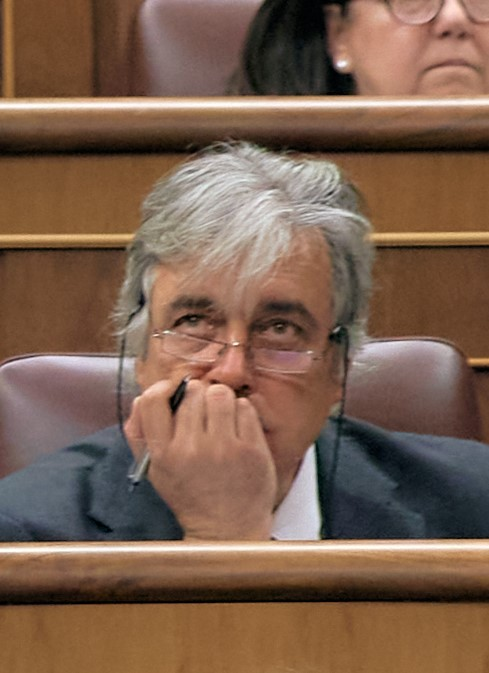
- Puy in 2024

Member of the Congress of Deputies
- Incumbent
- Assumed office 17 August 2023
- Constituency: Pontevedra

Personal details
- Born: 17 October 1962 (age 63)
- Party: People's Party

Pedro Puy Fraga (born 17 October 1962) is a Spanish politician serving as a member of the Congress of Deputies since 2023. From 2009 to 2023, he was a member of the Parliament of Galicia.
