= María Luisa del Pilar García Gurruchaga =

Spanish politician

María Luisa del Pilar García Gurruchaga MP

Member of the Congress of Deputies
- Incumbent
- Assumed office 2023
- Constituency: Gipuzkoa

Personal details
- Born: 14 March 1959 (age 66) Ataun, Spain
- Party: Spanish Socialist Workers' Party

María Luisa del Pilar García Gurruchaga (born 14 March 1959) is a Spanish politician from the Spanish Socialist Workers' Party (PSOE). In the 2023 Spanish general election she was elected to the Congress of Deputies in Gipuzkoa.

== See also ==
- List of members of the 15th Congress of Deputies
