= Juan José Aizcorbe Torra =

Spanish politician (born 1959)

Juan José Aizcorbe Torra MP
- Torra in 2023

Member of the Congress of Deputies
- Incumbent
- Assumed office 21 May 2019
- Constituency: Barcelona

Personal details
- Born: 9 July 1959 (age 67) Barcelona, Spain
- Party: Vox (since 2017)
- Other political affiliations: FN (1978–1982); Juntas Españolas (1984–1990); PP (1995–1997); PADE (1998–2008)
- Education: University of Barcelona; ESIC University
- Occupation: Lawyer • Politician

Juan José Aizcorbe Torra (born 9 July 1959) is a Spanish politician and lawyer who is a deputy in the Congress of Deputies for the Vox party.

== Biography ==
Torra holds a law degree from the University of Barcelona and a master's in business studies ESIC University in Madrid. He was called to the bar in Barcelona before working as a lawyer specializing in bankruptcy law in the private sector.

He describes himself as a practicing Catholic and is married with three children.

== Political career ==
He was associated to the Juntas Españolas in Barcelona, but left the organisation after describing it as too radical and joined the People's Party. In 1998, he led the Spanish Democratic Party (PADE) in Catalonia.

Since 2018, he has been a member of Vox and was elected to the Congress of Deputies in the November 2019 Spanish general election for the Barcelona constituency.
