= Ester Muñoz =

Spanish politician (born 1985)

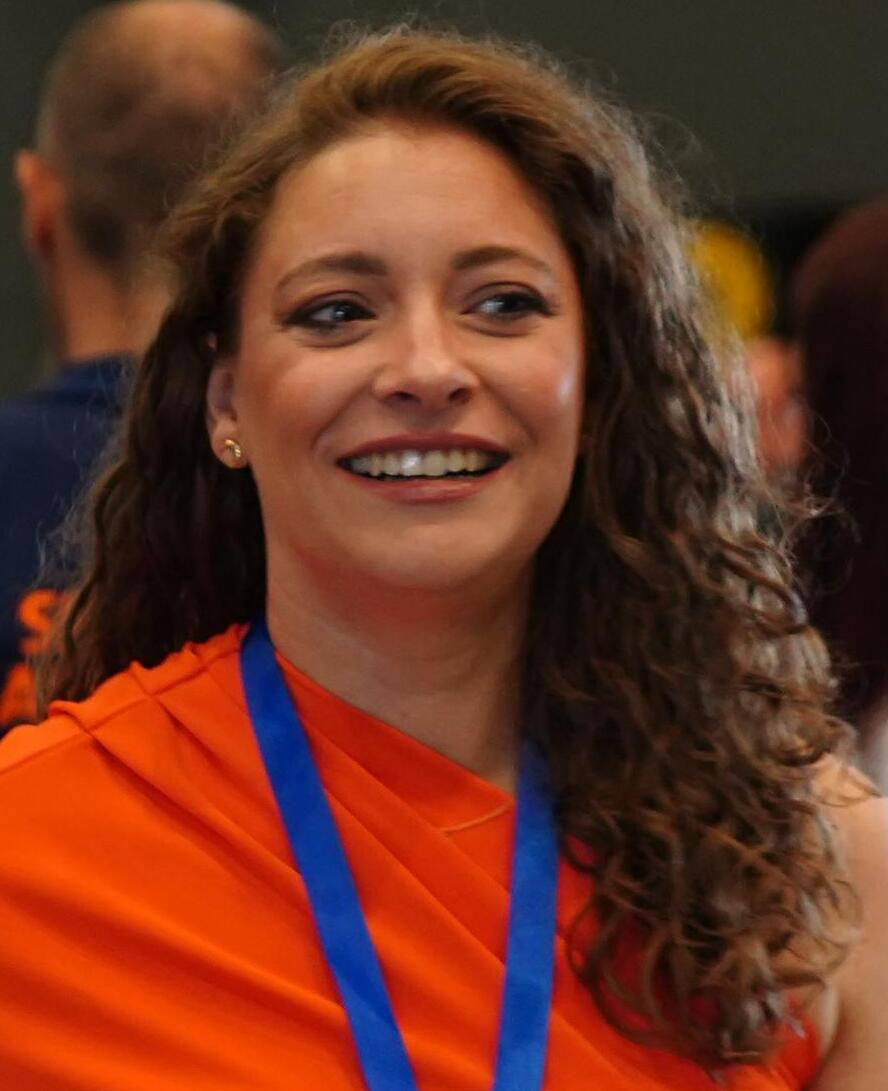
- Muñoz in 2025

Member of the Congress of Deputies
- Incumbent
- Assumed office 27 July 2023
- Constituency: León

Member of the Senate
- In office 13 January 2016 – 4 March 2019
- Constituency: León

Personal details
- Born: 13 June 1985 (age 40)
- Party: People's Party

Ester Muñoz de la Iglesia (born 13 June 1985) is a Spanish politician serving as a member of the Congress of Deputies since 2023. From 2016 to 2019, she was a member of the Senate.
