= Nahuel González =

Spanish politician (born 1989)

Member of the Congress of Deputies
- Incumbent
- Assumed office 17 August 2023
- Constituency: Valencia

Personal details
- Born: 7 March 1989 (age 37)
- Party: United Left (since 2011)

Nahuel González López (born 7 March 1989) is a Spanish politician serving as a member of the Congress of Deputies since 2023. From 2015 to 2023, he served as deputy mayor of Gandia.
