= Dolores Corujo =

Spanish politician (born 1977)

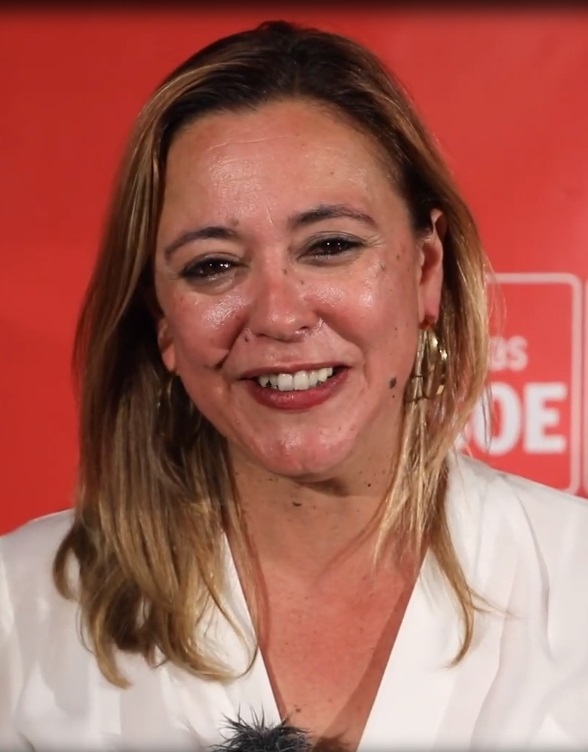
- Corujo in 2019

Member of the Congress of Deputies
- Incumbent
- Assumed office 17 August 2023
- Constituency: Las Palmas

Personal details
- Born: 8 April 1977 (age 49)
- Party: Spanish Socialist Workers' Party (since 2000)

María Dolores Corujo Berriel (born 8 April 1977) is a Spanish politician serving as a member of the Congress of Deputies since 2023. From 2019 to 2023, she served as president of the cabildo insular of Lanzarote. From 2011 to 2019, she served as mayor of San Bartolomé. From 2015 to 2023, she was a member of the Parliament of the Canary Islands.
