= Pablo Sáez Alonso-Muñumer =

Spanish politician

Pablo Sáez Alonso-Muñumer MP
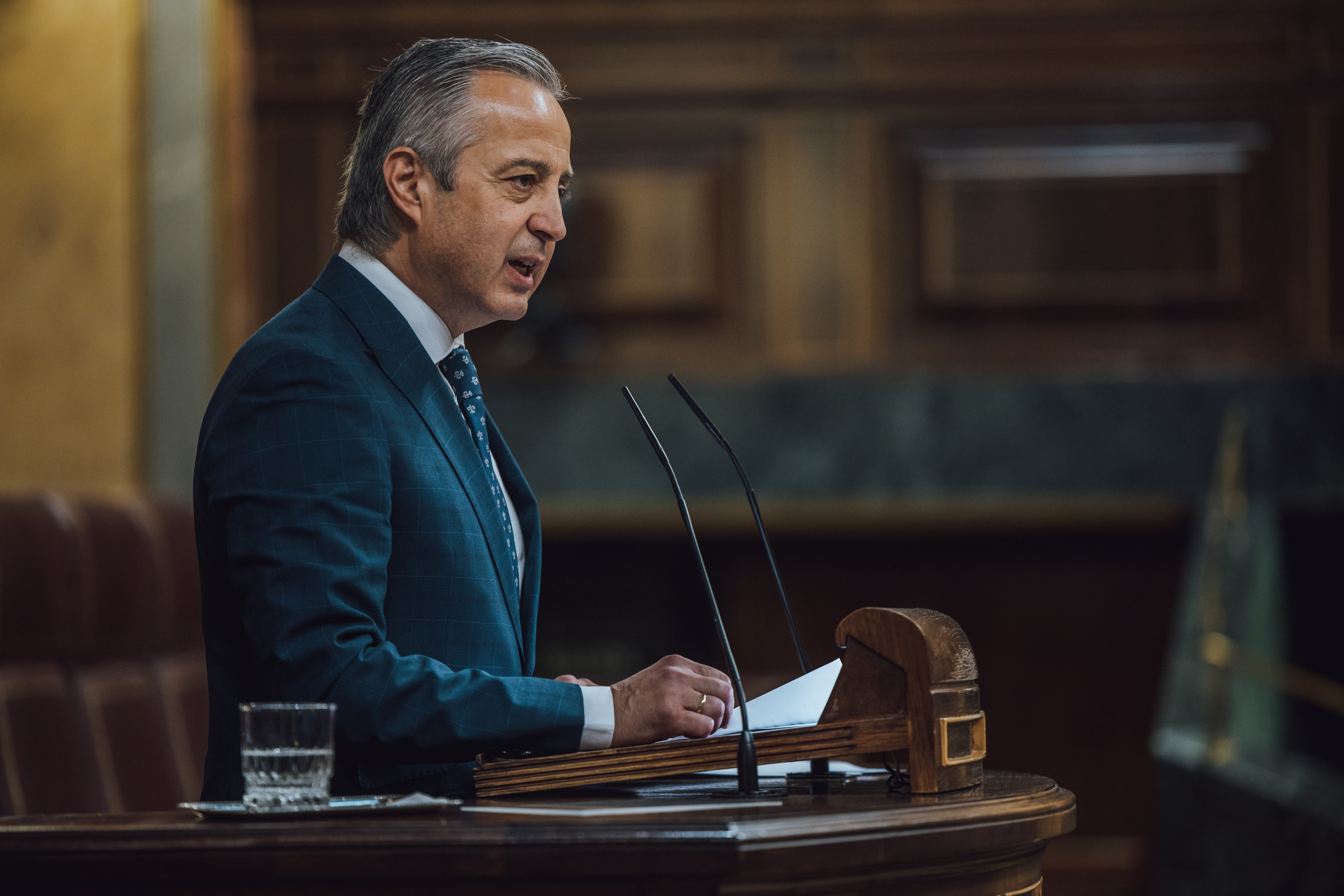

Member of the Congress of Deputies
- Incumbent
- Assumed office 10 November 2019
- Constituency: Valladolid

Personal details
- Born: Pablo Sáez Alonso-Muñumer; 11 June 1964 (age 62) Valladolid, Kingdom of Spain
- Party: Vox (2014-); People's Party (before 2014)
- Education: University of Valladolid; IESE Business School

Pablo Sáez Alonso-Muñumer (born June 11, 1964) is a Spanish politician representing the Vox party in the Congress of Deputies since 2019.

Muñumer holds a degree in economics from the University of Valladolid and a Master's in financial law from the IESE Business School. After graduating, he worked as an insurance broker for thirty years. He first became a member of Vox in 2014 and served on the party's national executive committee before becoming the party treasurer. During the November 2019 Spanish general election, he was elected to the 14th Cortes Generales representing the Valladolid constituency.
