= Héctor Palencia Rubio =

Spanish politician (born 1977)

Member of the Congress of Deputies
- Incumbent
- Assumed office 17 August 2023
- Constituency: Ávila

Personal details
- Born: 24 August 1977 (age 48)
- Party: People's Party

Héctor Palencia Rubio (born 24 August 1977) is a Spanish politician serving as a member of the Congress of Deputies since 2023. From 2022 to 2023, he served as chief of staff to Alfonso Fernández Mañueco. Until 2012, he served as president of Óbila CB.
