= Marta Varela Pazos =

Spanish politician (born 1983)

Member of the Congress of Deputies
- Incumbent
- Assumed office 17 August 2023
- Constituency: Madrid

Personal details
- Born: 24 August 1983 (age 42)
- Party: People's Party

Marta Varela Pazos (born 24 August 1983) is a Spanish politician serving as a member of the Congress of Deputies since 2023. She has served as chief of staff to Alberto Núñez Feijóo since 2020.
