= Carmen Navarro Lacoba =

Spanish politician (born 1978)

Member of the Congress of Deputies
- Incumbent
- Assumed office 13 January 2016
- Constituency: Albacete

Personal details
- Born: 13 June 1978 (age 47)
- Party: People's Party

María del Carmen Navarro Lacoba (born 13 June 1978) is a Spanish politician serving as a member of the Congress of Deputies since 2016. She has served as fourth secretary of the Congress of Deputies since 2023.
