= Pedro Fernández (politician) =

Spanish politician (born 1970)

Pedro Fernández MP
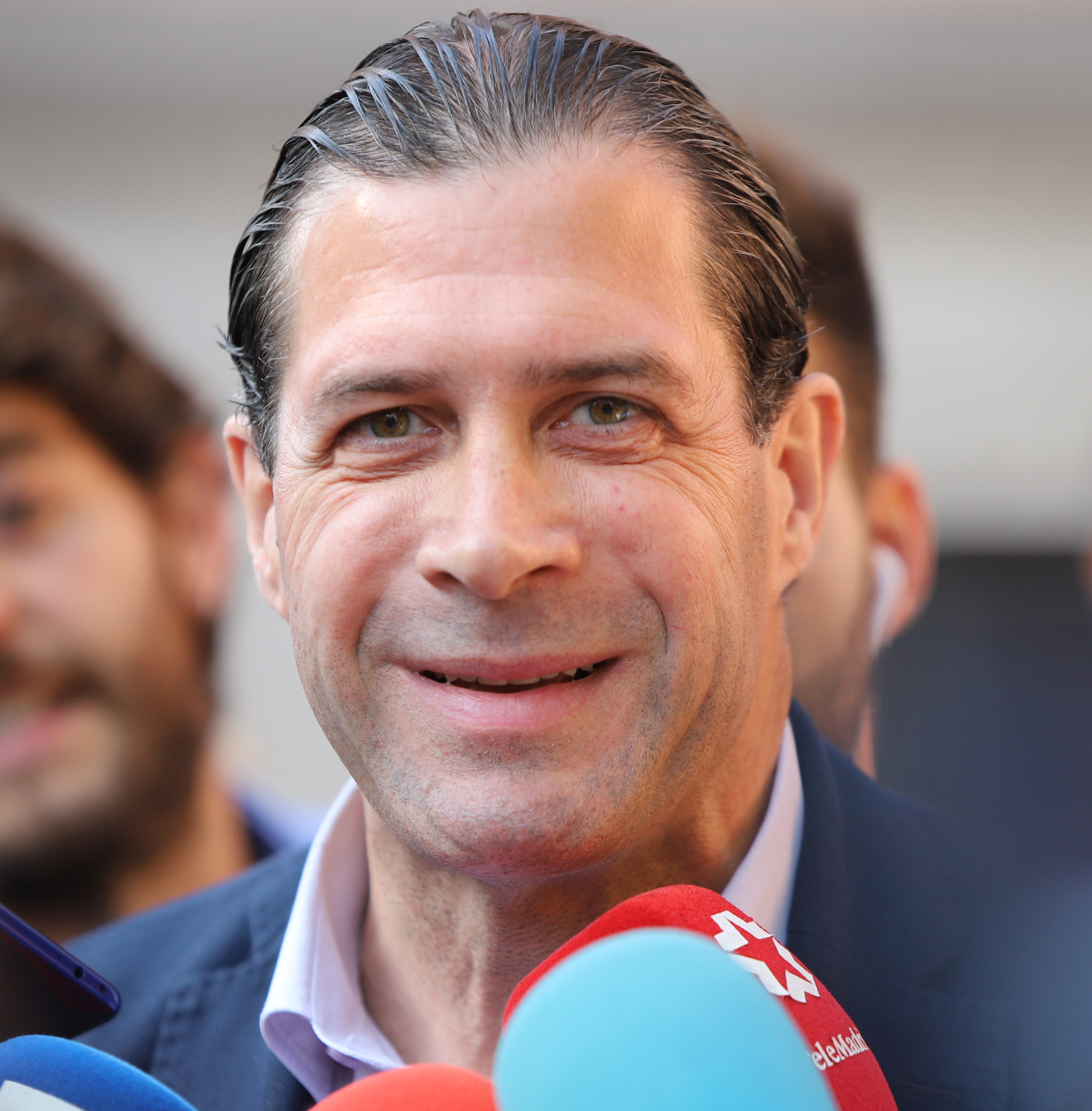

Member of the Congress of Deputies
- Incumbent
- Assumed office 21 May 2019
- Constituency: Zaragoza

Personal details
- Born: Pedro Fernández Hernández; 11 February 1970 (age 56) Madrid, Kingdom of Spain
- Party: Vox

Pedro Fernández Hernández (born 11 February 1970) is a Spanish politician and a member of the Congress of Deputies for the Vox party. He represents the constituency of Zaragoza since May 2019. Fernández Hernández has also been a councilor for Madrid City Council since June 2019.
