= Joan Mesquida Mayans =

Spanish politician (born 1978)

Joan Mesquida Mayans MP

Member of the Congress of Deputies
- Incumbent
- Assumed office 2023
- Constituency: Balearic Islands

Personal details
- Born: 26 January 1978 (age 48) Palma de Mallorca, Spain
- Party: People's Party (Spain)

Joan Mesquida Mayans (born 26 January 1978) is a Spanish politician from the People's Party. In the 2023 Spanish general election he was elected to the Congress of Deputies in Balearic Islands.

== See also ==
- 15th Congress of Deputies
