= Manuel Mariscal Zabala =

Spanish politician and journalist

Manuel Mariscal Zabala MP
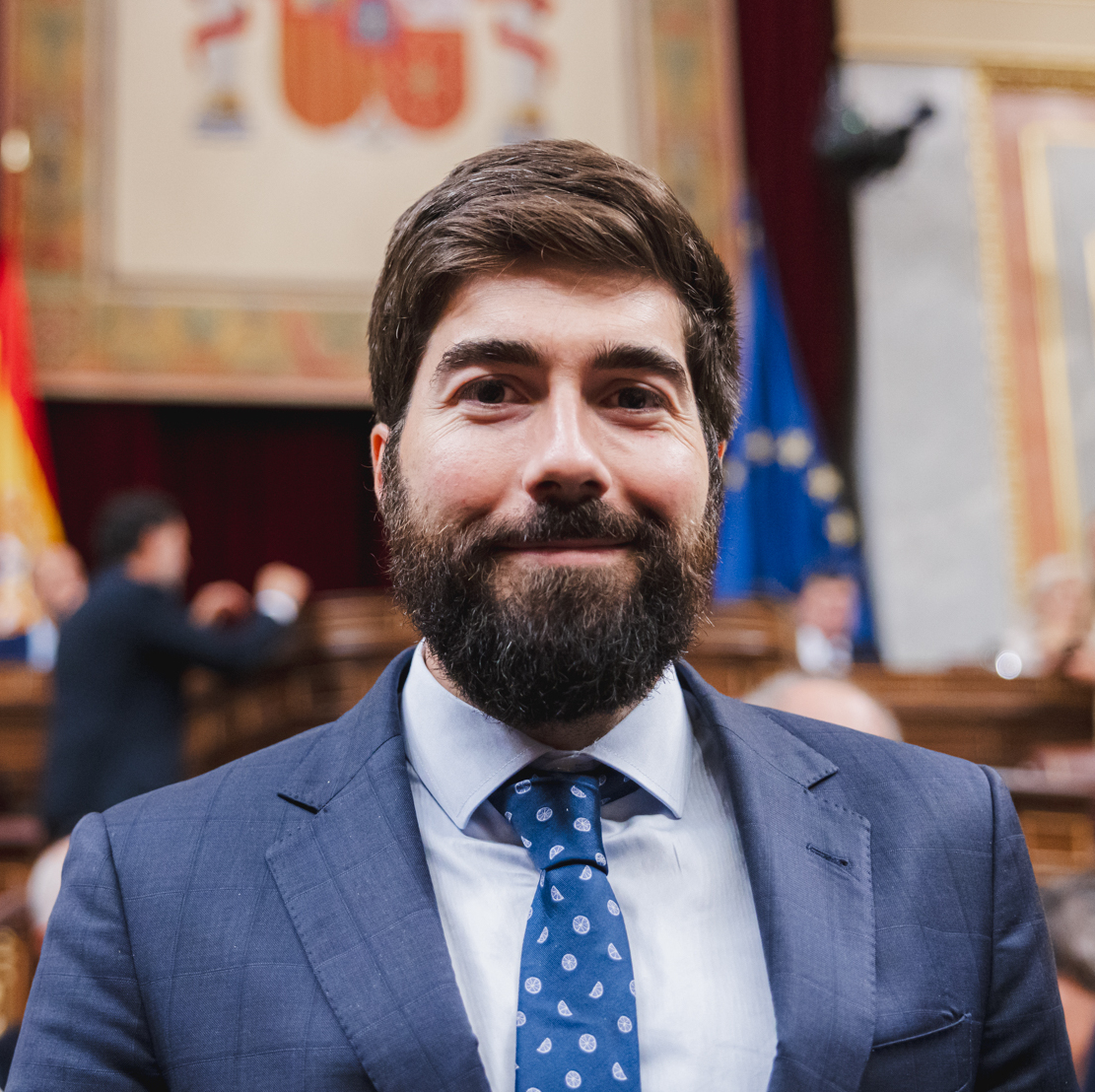

Member of the Congress of Deputies
- Incumbent
- Assumed office 21 May 2019
- Constituency: Toledo

Personal details
- Born: 23 January 1992 (age 34) Talavera de la Reina
- Party: People's Party (before 2019); Vox (2019–present)
- Education: Complutense University of Madrid

Manuel Mariscal Zabala (born 23 January 1992) is a Spanish politician and journalist.

== Biography ==
Zabala studied journalism followed by a Master's degree in communication at the Complutense University of Madrid. After graduating he joined ABC newspaper as a trainee reporter. He was a member of the People's Party and worked as a campaign assistant and social media coordinator for the Mayor of Madrid Esperanza Aguirre.

He joined Vox and stood as a candidate for the Spanish general election in May 2019 in which he was elected to the Congress of Deputies for the Toledo constituency. He was re-elected in November 2019.
