= Alba Soldevilla Novials =

Spanish politician (born 1987)

Member of the Congress of Deputies
- Incumbent
- Assumed office 12 December 2023
- Preceded by: Miquel Iceta
- Constituency: Barcelona

Personal details
- Born: 7 September 1987 (age 38)
- Party: Socialists' Party of Catalonia

Alba Soldevilla Novials (born 7 September 1987) is a Spanish politician serving as a member of the Congress of Deputies since 2023. She is the deputy first secretary of the Socialists' Party of Catalonia in Terrassa.
