= Juan Luis Steegmann Olmedillas =

Spanish politician

Juan Luis Steegmann Olmedillas MP

Member of the Congress of Deputies
- In office 21 May 2019 – 17 August 2023
- Constituency: Madrid

Personal details
- Born: 8 July 1955 (age 70) Madrid, Kingdom of Spain
- Party: Vox (since 2013); PSOE (until 2004)

Juan Luis Steegmann Olmedillas (born 8 July 1955 in Madrid) is a Spanish scientist and doctor who has been a director of the European LeukemiaNet research group and the GELMC group of the Spanish Society of Hematology.

He is also a politician and represented the Vox party in the Congress of Deputies from 2019 to 2023.

== Biography ==
=== Career ===
Olmedillas was born in Madrid in 1955. He worked at the Hospital Universitario de la Princesa where he became an expert in hemotherapy. He was a founding member and later a director of the European LeukemiaNet group, an EU based organisation which seeks to research cancer and adverse drug effects.

Following the COVID-19 outbreak in Spain, Olmedillas argued that the Spanish government should look to South Korea on how to prevent the spread and accused Fernando Simón and the Spanish government of mismanaging the pandemic by not making public testing more available while giving unreliable casualty predictions which he claimed led to more deaths and Spain implementing a stricter lockdown.

=== Politics ===
Olmedillas stated that he sympathized with Marxism during his time as a student and was a communist until visiting the Soviet Union in the 1980s. He was then a member of the PSOE until the 2004 Madrid train bombings. He became a member of Vox through becoming acquainted with Santiago Abascal.

In 2019, he was elected to the Congress of Deputies for Vox representing the Madrid constituency. He is also the party's spokesman on healthcare matters.
