= Pedro Gallardo Barrena =

Spanish politician (born 1974)

Pedro Gallardo Barrena MP

Member of the Congress of Deputies
- Incumbent
- Assumed office 23 July 2023
- Constituency: Cádiz

Personal details
- Born: 24 March 1974 (age 52) Spain
- Party: People's Party (Spain)

Pedro Ignacio Gallardo Barrena (born 24 March 1974) is a Spanish politician from the People's Party.
