= 14th Congress of Deputies =

Congress of Deputies from November 2019 election

| ← | 13th | 15th | → |
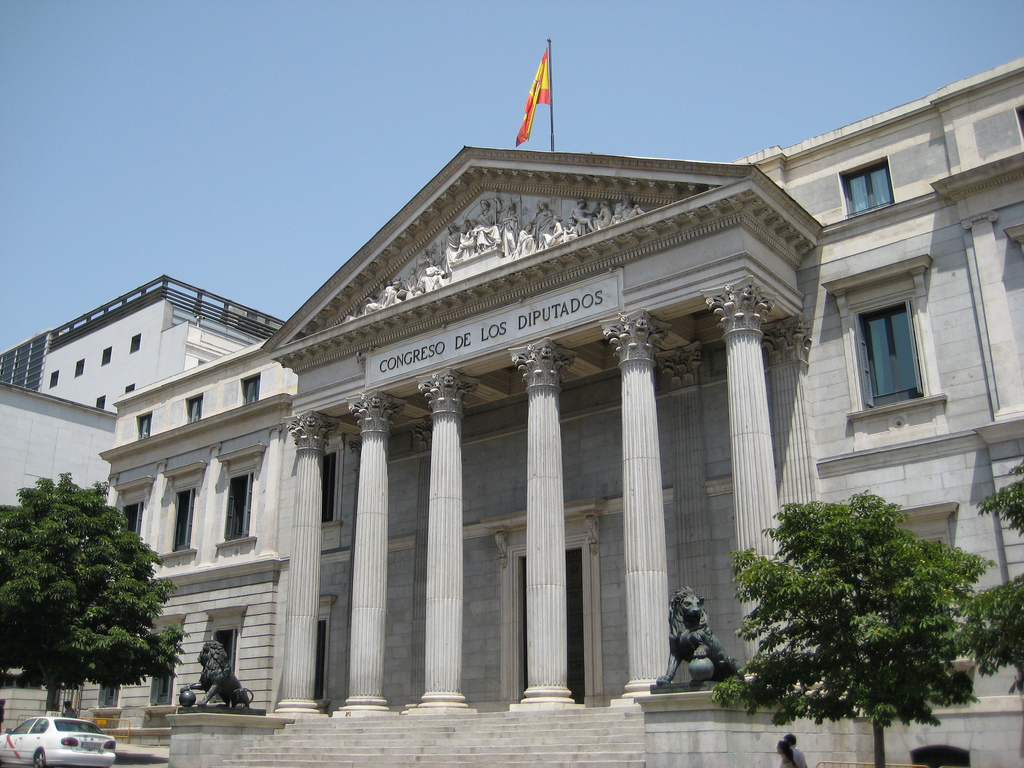

Overview
- Legislative body: Congress of Deputies
- Meeting place: Palacio de las Cortes
- Term: 3 December 2019 – 30 May 2023
- Election: 10 November 2019
- Government: Sánchez II
- Website: congreso.es

Deputies
- Members: 350
- President: Meritxell Batet (PSOE)
- First Vice-President: Alfonso Rodríguez (PSOE)
- Second Vice-President: Ana Pastor (PP)
- Third Vice-President: Gloria Elizo (UP)
- Fourth Vice-President: Ignacio Gil (Vox)
- First Secretary: Gerardo Pisarello (ECP)
- Second Secretary: Sofía Hernanz (PSOE)
- Third Secretary: Javier Sánchez (UP)
- Fourth Secretary: Adolfo Suárez (PP)

The 14th Congress of Deputies was a meeting of the Congress of Deputies, the lower house of the Spanish Cortes Generales, with the membership determined by the results of the general election held on 10 November 2019. The congress met for the first time on 3 December 2019, and was dissolved on 30 May 2023.

== Election ==
The 14th Spanish general election under the 1978 Constitution was held on 10 November 2019. It saw the Spanish Socialist Workers' Party (PSOE) remaining the largest party in the Congress of Deputies, but falling short of a majority.

| Alliance | Votes | % | Seats | +/− |
|---|---|---|---|---|
| PSOE | 6,792,199 | 28.00 | 120 | –3 |
| PP | 5,047,040 | 20.81 | 89 | +23 |
| Vox | 3,656,979 | 15.08 | 52 | +28 |
| UP–ECP–EC | 3,119,364 | 12.86 | 35 | –7 |
| ERC–Sob–ERPV | 880,734 | 3.63 | 13 | –2 |
| Cs | 1,650,318 | 6.80 | 10 | –47 |
| JxCat–Junts | 530,225 | 2.19 | 8 | +1 |
| EAJ/PNV | 379,002 | 1.56 | 6 | ±0 |
| EH Bildu | 277,621 | 1.14 | 5 | +1 |
| Others/blanks | 1,924,746 | 7.93 | 12 | +6 |
| Total | 24,258,228 | 100.00 | 350 | ±0 |

== History ==
The new congress met for the first time on 3 December 2019 and after two rounds of voting Meritxell Batet (PSOE) was elected as President of the Congress of Deputies with the support of the Unidos Podemos–En Comú Podem (UP–ECP) and various nationalist and regionalist parties.

Other members of the Bureau of the Congress of Deputies were also elected on 21 May 2019: Alfonso Rodríguez (PSOE), First Vice-President; Ana Pastor (PP), Second Vice-President; Gloria Elizo (UP), Third Vice-President; Ignacio Gil (Vox), Fourth Vice-President; Gerardo Pisarello (ECP), First Secretary; Sofía Hernanz (PSOE), Second Secretary; Javier Sánchez (UP), Third Secretary; and Adolfo Suárez (PP), Fourth Secretary.

President
| Candidate | | Votes | |
| Candidate | | Round 1 | Round 2 |
|---|---|---|---|
| Meritxell Batet | PSOE | 167 | 166 |
| Ana Pastor | PP | 91 | 140 |
| Macarena Olona | Vox | 52 | —N/a |
| Blank ballots | | 11 | 11 |
| Invalid ballots | | 28 | 29 |
| Absentees | | 1 | 4 |
| Total | | 350 | 350 |

Vice-President
| Candidate | | Votes |
|---|---|---|
| Alfonso Rodríguez | PSOE | 108 |
| Ana Pastor | PP | 101 |
| Gloria Elizo | UP | 77 |
| Ignacio Gil | Vox | 52 |
| Blank ballots | | 1 |
| Invalid ballots | | 9 |
| Absentees | | 2 |
| Total | | 350 |

Secretary
| Candidate | | Votes | |
|---|---|---|---|
| Gerardo Pisarello | ECP | 67 | 91 |
| Sofía Hernanz | PSOE | 67 | 87 |
| Javier Sánchez | UP | 60 | —N/a |
| Adolfo Suárez | PP | 58 | —N/a |
| José Figaredo | Vox | 52 | —N/a |
| José María Espejo-Saavedra | Cs | 43 | —N/a |
| Blank ballots | | 1 | 0 |
| Invalid ballots | | 0 | 0 |
| Absentees | | 2 | 53 |
| Total | | 350 | 231 |

== Government ==
Shortly after the election the PSOE and Unidas Podemos–En Comú Podem agreed to form a coalition government, the first in Spain since the restoration of democracy. Caretaker Prime Minister Pedro Sánchez (PSOE) was re-elected narrowly in January 2020 with the support of the UP–ECP and various nationalist and regionalist parties.

Investiture; Pedro Sánchez (PSOE)
| Ballot → | 5 January 2020 | 7 January 2020 |
| Required majority → | 176 out of 350 | Simple |
| Yes: • PSOE (120); • UP–ECP–GeC (35) (34 on 5 Jan); • PNV (6); • Más País (2); • Compromís (1); • NCa (1); • BNG (1); • TE (1) | 166 / 350 | 167 / 350 |
| No: • PP (88); • Vox (52); • Cs (10); • JxCat (8); • CUP (2); • UPN (2); • CCa (1); • PRC (1); • FAC (1) | 165 / 350 | 165 / 350 |
| Abstentions: • ERC (13); • EH Bildu (5) | 18 / 350 | 18 / 350 |
| Absentees: • UP–ECP–GeC (1) (on 5 Jan) | 1 / 350 | 0 / 350 |

== Deaths, resignations and expulsions ==
The 14th congress has seen the following deaths, resignations and expulsions:

- 13 January 2020 – Beatriz Corredor (PSOE) resigned for personal reasons. She was replaced by Isaura Leal (PSOE) on 4 February 2020.
- 15 January 2020 – Dolores Delgado (PSOE) resigned after being appointed Attorney General of Spain. She was replaced by Omar Anguita (PSOE) on 4 February 2020.
- 21 January 2020 – Héctor Illueca (UP) and Francisco Salazar (PSOE) resigned after being appointed Director of the Labour Inspectorate and deputy chief of staff of the government respectively. They were replaced by Rosa Medel (UP) and José Losada (PSOE) respectively on 4 February 2020.
- 22 January 2020 – Elena Máñez (PSOE) resigned after being appointed Minister of Economy, Research and Employment of the Canary Islands. She was replaced by Juan Fuentes (PSOE) on 4 February 2020.
- 27 January 2020 – Francisco Polo (PSOE) resigned after being appointed High Commissioner for an Entrepreneurial Nation. He was replaced by Sonia Guerra (PSOE) on 4 February 2020.
- 29 January 2020 – José Guirao (PSOE) resigned to return to cultural management and María Rosell (UP) resigned after being appointed government delegate against gender violence. They were replaced by Indalecio Gutiérrez (PSOE) and Meri Pita (UP) respectively on 4 February 2020.
- 11 February 2020 – José Manuel Franco (PSOE), Javier Izquierdo (PSOE) and María Marrodán (PSOE) resigned after being appointed government delegates in the Community of Madrid, Castile and León and La Rioja respectively. They were replaced by Rafael Vélez (PSOE), Julio del Valle (PSOE) and Raquel Pedraja (PSOE) respectively.
- 21 February 2020 - Isabel Celaá, Fernando Grande-Marlaska, Reyes Maroto, José Montilla Martos, Luis Planas, Teresa Ribera, Margarita Robles, Juan Carlos Campo, Pedro Saura (PSOE) resigned as Deputies to focus on their minister or junior minister positions. They were replaced by Daniel Senderos, Gemma Araujo, Gema López, Inmaculada Oria, Antonio Hurtado Zurera, Julio Navalpotro, Manuel Arribas, José Ramón Ortega and Carmen Baños respectively.
- 13 March 2020 - Pablo Arangüena and Marina Ortega (PSOE) resigned to run in the 2020 Galician regional election. They were replaced by Diego Taibo and Uxía Tizón respectively.
- 21 May 2020 - Marcos de Quinto (Cs) resigned. He was replaced by Miguel Ángel Gutiérrez.
- 15 July 2020 - Isabel García Tejerina (PP) resigned. She was replaced by Gabriel Elorriaga.
- 12 November 2020 - Carlos Fernández-Roca (Vox) resigned. He was replaced by Mercedes Jara.
- 31 January 2021 - María Pilar Ramallo (PP) resigned to focus in her job as mayor of Marín, Pontevedra. She was replaced by Juan Manuel Constenla.
- 4 March 2021 - Jaume Alonso-Cuevillas (JxCat) resigned after being elected to the Parliament of Catalonia in the 2021 Catalan regional election. He was replaced by Josep Pagès.
- 11 March 2021 - Laura Borràs (JxCat) and Ignacio Garriga (Vox) resigned after being elected to the Parliament of Catalonia in the 2021 Catalan regional election. They were replaced by Pilar Calvo and Juan Carlos Segura respectively.
- 26 March 2021 - Pablo Iglesias Turrión (UP) resigned in order to run for President of the Community of Madrid in the 2021 Madrilenian regional election, he was replaced by Mercedes Pérez Merino. Marta Martín Llaguno (Cs) resigned, she was replaced by Juan Ignacio López-Bas.
- 4 May 2021 - Joan Josep Nuet (ERC) was expelled following a debarment procedure from the Supreme Court of Spain. He was replaced by Gerard Álvarez i García.
- 8 June 2021 - María Márquez Guerrero (UP) resigned and was replaced by Miguel Ángel Bustamante Martín.
- 27 July 2021 - Pilar Cancela Rodríguez (PSOE) resigned after being named secretary of State of International Cooperation. She was replaced by Natividad González Laso.
- 5 October 2021 - Noelia Vera (UP) resigned and retired from politics, and was replaced by Juan Antonio Delgado Ramos.
- 22 October 2021 - Alberto Rodríguez (UP) was expelled following a debarment procedure from the Supreme Court of Spain. No other UP candidate took his seat, remaining vacant in protest for the ruling.
- 30 November 2021 - Teresa Jiménez-Becerril (PP) resigned when appointed associate to the Spanish Ombudsman. She was replaced by Ricardo Tarno.
- 28 March 2022 - Manuel Gabriel González Ramos (PSOE) resigned when appointed to the board of directors of Enagás. He was replaced by José Carlos Díaz Rodríguez.
- 4 April 2022 - Pablo Casado (PP), leader of the opposition, resigned after a party rebellion against him. He was replaced by Percival Manglano.
- 21 April 2022 - Pablo Montesinos (PP) resigned in solidarity with former party leader Pablo Casado. He was replaced by Ángel Luis González Muñoz.
- 27 June 2022 - Macarena Olona (Vox) and Juan Antonio Delgado Ramos (UP) resigned after being elected to the Parliament of Andalusia in the 2022 Andalusian regional election. They were replaced by Onofre Miralles and José Luis Bueno Pinto respectively.
- 30 June 2022 - Pedro Quevedo (NC) resigned. He was replaced by María Fernández Pérez.
- 26 July 2022 - Carolina España (PP) resigned after being appointed Finance Minister of the Regional Government of Andalusia. She was replaced by Isabel Gema Pérez Recuerda.
- 27 July 2022 - María José García-Pelayo Jurado (PP) resigned after being appointed Senator. She was replaced by José Ignacio Romaní.
- 18 October 2022 - Magdalena Valerio (PSOE) resigned after being appointed President of the Spanish Council of State. She was replaced by Aurelio Zapata Simón.
- 18 November 2022 - Miguel Ángel Bustamante (UP) resigned after being indicted of domestic violence; he was replaced by Ezequiel García Nieto.
- 5 December 2022 - Adolfo Suárez Illana (PP) retired from politics. He was replaced by Miguel Ángel Quintanilla Navarro.
- 1 February 2023 - Odón Elorza (PSOE) resigned. He was replaced by María Luisa García Gurrutxaga.
- 14 February 2023 - Juan Bernardo Fuentes Curbelo (PSOE), nicknamed Tito Berni, resigned after being involved in a corruption scandal. He was replaced by José Francisco Duque.
- 17 March 2023 - Teodoro García Egea, right-hand man of former PP leader Pablo Casado, resigned. He was replaced by Antonia López Moya.

== Members ==
| Name | Constituency | No. | Party | Alliance | Group | Took office | Left office | Notes |
|---|---|---|---|---|---|---|---|---|
| José Luis Ábalos | Valencia | 1 | PSPV | PSOE | Socialists | 3 December 2019 | | |
| Santiago Abascal | Madrid | 1 | Vox | | Vox | 3 December 2019 | | |
| José Aceves | Segovia | 1 | PSCyL | PSOE | Socialists | 3 December 2019 | | |
| Joseba Andoni Agirretxea | Gipuzkoa | 1 | EAJ/PNV | | Basque | 3 December 2019 | | |
| Juan José Aizcorbe | Barcelona | 2 | Vox | | Vox | 3 December 2019 | | |
| Mertxe Aizpurua | Gipuzkoa | 1 | | EH Bildu | EH Bildu | 3 December 2019 | | |
| Francisco Alcaraz | Jaén | 1 | Vox | | Vox | 3 December 2019 | | |
| Javier Alfonso | León | 1 | PSCyL | PSOE | Socialists | 3 December 2019 | | |
| Agustín Almodóbar | Alicante | 3 | PPCV | PP | People's | 3 December 2019 | | |
| José Alonso | Valladolid | 1 | PPCyL | PP | People's | 3 December 2019 | | |
| María Olga Alonso | Pontevedra | 1 | PSdeG | PSOE | Socialists | 3 December 2019 | | |
| Jaume Alonso-Cuevillas | Barcelona | 3 | Indep. | JxCat | Plural | 4 January 2020 | | Aligned to CNxR. |
| Beatriz Fanjul | Biscay | 1 | EAP | PP | People's | 3 December 2019 | | |
| Cayetana Álvarez | Barcelona | 1 | PPC | PP | People's | 3 December 2019 | | |
| Carmen Andrés | Barcelona | 7 | PSC | PSOE | Socialists | 3 December 2019 | | |
| Josefa Andrés | Valencia | 4 | PSPV | PSOE | Socialists | 3 December 2019 | | |
| Omar Anguita | Madrid | 12 | PSOE–M | PSOE | Socialists | 4 February 2020 | | Replaces Dolores Delgado. |
| María Teresa Angulo | Badajoz | 2 | PPE | PP | People's | 3 December 2019 | | |
| Javier Antón | Soria | 1 | PSCyL | PSOE | Socialists | 3 December 2019 | | |
| Carlos Aragonés | Madrid | 9 | PPCM | PP | People's | 3 December 2019 | | |
| Francisco Aranda | Barcelona | 6 | PSC | PSOE | Socialists | 3 December 2019 | | |
| Pablo Arangüena | A Coruña | 2 | PSdeG | PSOE | Socialists | 3 December 2019 | | |
| Inés Arrimadas | Barcelona | 1 | Cs | Cs | Citizens | 3 December 2019 | | |
| Alberto Asarta | Castellón | 1 | Vox | | Vox | 3 December 2019 | | |
| Jaume Asens | Barcelona | 1 | BEC | ECP | UP–ECP–GEC (Note: Unidos Podemos–En Comú Podem–Galicia en Común.) | 3 December 2019 | | |
| Edmundo Bal | Madrid | 4 | Indep. | Cs | Citizens | 3 December 2019 | | Replaces Albert Rivera. |
| Joan Baldoví | Valencia | 1 | Bloc | MP | Plural | 3 December 2019 | | |
| Iñigo Barandiaran | Gipuzkoa | 2 | EAJ/PNV | | Basque | 3 December 2019 | | |
| Javier Bas | Pontevedra | 3 | PPdeG | PP | People's | 3 December 2019 | | |
| Montserrat Bassa | Girona | 1 | ERC | ERC–Sob | Republican | 3 December 2019 | | |
| Meritxell Batet | Barcelona | 1 | PSC | PSOE | Socialists | 3 December 2019 | | President. |
| Ferran Bel | Tarragona | 1 | PDeCAT | JxCat | Plural | 3 December 2019 | | |
| Ione Belarra | Navarre | 1 | Podemos | UP | UP–ECP–GEC | 3 December 2019 | | |
| Ana Beltrán | Madrid | 7 | PPCM | PP | People's | 3 December 2019 | | |
| Laura Berja | Jaén | 2 | PSOE–A | PSOE | Socialists | 3 December 2019 | | |
| José Antonio Bermúdez | Salamanca | 1 | PPCyL | PP | People's | 3 December 2019 | | |
| Vicente Betoret | Valencia | 2 | PPCV | PP | People's | 3 December 2019 | | |
| Patricia Blanquer | Alicante | 2 | PSPV | PSOE | Socialists | 3 December 2019 | | |
| Genís Boadella | Barcelona | 4 | PDeCAT | JxCat | Plural | 3 December 2019 | | |
| Laura Borràs | Barcelona | 1 | CNxR | JxCat | Plural | 3 December 2019 | | |
| Mireia Borrás | Madrid | 7 | Vox | | Vox | 3 December 2019 | | |
| Isabel María Borrego | Murcia | 2 | PPRM | PP | People's | 3 December 2019 | | |
| Ana Botella | Valencia | 2 | PSPV | PSOE | Socialists | 3 December 2019 | | |
| Albert Botran | Barcelona | 2 | PL | CUP–PR | Mixed | 3 December 2019 | | |
| Eva Bravo | Cádiz | 2 | PSOE–A | PSOE | Socialists | 3 December 2019 | | |
| Eva Bueno | Seville | 5 | PSOE–A | PSOE | Socialists | 3 December 2019 | | |
| Helena Caballero | Valladolid | 2 | PSCyL | PSOE | Socialists | 3 December 2019 | | |
| Tomás Cabezón | Soria | 1 | PPCyL | PP | People's | 3 December 2019 | | |
| Juan Callejas | Ciudad Real | 2 | PPCM | PP | People's | 3 December 2019 | | |
| Carmen Calvo | Madrid | 2 | PSOE–M | PSOE | Socialists | 3 December 2019 | | |
| Pablo Calvo | León | 1 | Vox | | Vox | 3 December 2019 | | |
| Pablo Cambronero | Seville | 1 | Cs | Cs | Citizens | 3 December 2019 | | |
| Juan Carlos Campo | Cádiz | 3 | PSOE–A | PSOE | Socialists | 3 December 2019 | | |
| Concep Cañadell | Lleida | 1 | PDeCAT | JxCat | Plural | 3 December 2019 | | |
| Mariana Canales | Cuenca | 2 | PSCM | PSOE | Socialists | 3 December 2019 | | |
| Pilar Cancela | A Coruña | 1 | PSdeG | PSOE | Socialists | 3 December 2019 | | |
| Inés Cañizares | Toledo | 2 | Vox | | Vox | 3 December 2019 | | |
| Zaida Cantera | Madrid | 9 | PSOE–M | PSOE | Socialists | 3 December 2019 | | |
| Joan Capdevila | Barcelona | 7 | ERC | ERC–Sob | Republican | 3 December 2019 | | |
| Eduardo Carazo | Valladolid | 2 | PPCyL | PP | People's | 3 December 2019 | | |
| María Luisa Carcedo | Asturias | 2 | FSA | PSOE | Socialists | 3 December 2019 | | |
| Beatriz Carrillo | Seville | 3 | PSOE–A | PSOE | Socialists | 3 December 2019 | | |
| Pablo Casado | Madrid | 1 | PPCM | PP | People's | 3 December 2019 | | |
| Pedro Casares | Cantabria | 1 | PSC | PSOE | Socialists | 3 December 2019 | | |
| Alberto Casero | Cáceres | 1 | PPE | PP | People's | 3 December 2019 | | |
| Sofía Castañón | Asturias | 1 | Podemos | UP | UP–ECP–GEC | 3 December 2019 | | |
| Miguel Ángel Castellón Rubio | Almería | 1 | PPA | PP | People's | 3 December 2019 | | |
| Elena Castillo | Cantabria | 2 | PPC | PP | People's | 3 December 2019 | | |
| Isabel Celaá | Álava | 1 | PSE–EE | PSOE | Socialists | 3 December 2019 | | |
| Santos Cerdán | Navarre | 1 | PSN | PSOE | Socialists | 3 December 2019 | | |
| Javier Cerqueiro | Lugo | 2 | PSdeG | PSOE | Socialists | 3 December 2019 | | |
| Ricardo Chamorro | Ciudad Real | 1 | Vox | | Vox | 3 December 2019 | | |
| Óscar Clavell | Castellón | 1 | PPCV | PP | People's | 3 December 2019 | | |
| Francisco Contreras | Seville | 2 | Vox | | Vox | 3 December 2019 | | |
| Beatriz Corredor | Madrid | 8 | PSOE–M | PSOE | Socialists | 3 December 2019 | 13 January 2020 | Replaced by Isaura Leal. |
| Ismael Cortés | Tarragona | 1 | | ECP | UP–ECP–GEC | 3 December 2019 | | |
| Mario Cortés | Málaga | 3 | PPA | PP | People's | 3 December 2019 | | |
| Rafaela Crespín Rubio | Córdoba | 2 | PSOE–A | PSOE | Socialists | 3 December 2019 | | |
| María Cruz-Guzmán | Seville | 2 | PPA | PP | People's | 3 December 2019 | | |
| Juan Cuatrecasas | La Rioja | 2 | PSR | PSOE | Socialists | 3 December 2019 | | |
| Maria Dantas | Barcelona | 4 | ERC | ERC–Sob | Republican | 3 December 2019 | | |
| Patricia de la Heras | Balearic Islands | 2 | Vox | | Vox | 3 December 2019 | | |
| Celso Luis Delgado | Ourense | 2 | PPdeG | PP | People's | 3 December 2019 | | |
| Dolores Delgado | Madrid | 5 | PSOE–M | PSOE | Socialists | 3 December 2019 | 15 January 2020 | Replaced by Omar Anguita. |
| María de Luna | Barcelona | 2 | PPC | PP | People's | 3 December 2019 | | |
| Emilio del Valle | Cantabria | 1 | Vox | | Vox | 3 December 2019 | | |
| Julio del Valle | Valladolid | 3 | PSCyL | PSOE | Socialists | | | Replaces José Izquierdoz. |
| Rocío de Meer | Almería | 1 | Vox | | Vox | 3 December 2019 | | |
| Jaime Eduardo de Olano | Lugo | 1 | PPdeG | PP | People's | 3 December 2019 | | |
| Marcos de Quinto | Madrid | 2 | Indep. | Cs | Citizens | 3 December 2019 | | |
| Guillermo Díaz | Málaga | 1 | Cs | Cs | Citizens | 3 December 2019 | | |
| Yolanda Díaz | Pontevedra | 1 | PCE | UP | UP–ECP–GEC | 3 December 2019 | | |
| Luc Diouf | Las Palmas | 2 | PSC | PSOE | Socialists | 3 December 2019 | | |
| Pedro Duque | Alicante | 1 | Indep. | PSOE | Socialists | 3 December 2019 | | |
| José Carlos Durán | Málaga | 3 | PSOE–A | PSOE | Socialists | 3 December 2019 | | |
| José Echániz | Guadalajara | 1 | PPCM | PP | People's | 3 December 2019 | | |
| Pablo Echenique | Zaragoza | 1 | Podemos | UP | UP–ECP–GEC | 3 December 2019 | | |
| Gloria Elizo | Madrid | 4 | Podemos | UP | UP–ECP–GEC | 3 December 2019 | | Third Vice-President. |
| Odón Elorza | Gipuzkoa | 1 | PSE–EE | PSOE | Socialists | 3 December 2019 | | |
| Xavier Eritja | Lleida | 1 | ERC | ERC–Sob | Republican | 3 December 2019 | | |
| Íñigo Errejón | Madrid | 1 | MM | MP | Plural | 3 December 2019 | | |
| Carolina España | Málaga | 2 | PPA | PP | People's | 3 December 2019 | | |
| José María Espejo-Saavedra | Barcelona | 3 | Cs | Cs | Citizens | 3 December 2019 | | Replaces Fernando de Páramo. |
| Iván Espinosa de los Monteros | Madrid | 3 | Vox | | Vox | 3 December 2019 | | |
| Aitor Esteban | Biscay | 1 | EAJ/PNV | | Basque | 3 December 2019 | | |
| Cristina Esteban | Valencia | 2 | Vox | | Vox | 3 December 2019 | | |
| Antidio Fagúndez | Zamora | 1 | PSCyL | PSOE | Socialists | 3 December 2019 | | |
| María Faneca | Huelva | 1 | PSOE–A | PSOE | Socialists | 3 December 2019 | | |
| Ana Fernández | Cáceres | 1 | PSOE–E | PSOE | Socialists | 3 December 2019 | | |
| Andrea Fernández | León | 2 | PSCyL | PSOE | Socialists | 3 December 2019 | | |
| Pedro Fernández | Zaragoza | 1 | Vox | | Vox | 3 December 2019 | | |
| Tomás Fernández | Huelva | 1 | Vox | | Vox | 3 December 2019 | | |
| Rafael Fernández-Lomana | Albacete | 1 | Vox | | Vox | 3 December 2019 | | |
| Carlos Fernández-Roca | Almería | 2 | Vox | | Vox | 3 December 2019 | | |
| Sonia Ferrer | Almería | 2 | PSOE–A | PSOE | Socialists | 3 December 2019 | | |
| José María Figaredo | Asturias | 1 | Vox | | Vox | 3 December 2019 | | |
| Isabel Franco Carmona | Seville | 2 | Podemos | UP | UP–ECP–GEC | 3 December 2019 | | |
| José Manuel Franco | Madrid | 3 | PSOE–M | PSOE | Socialists | 3 December 2019 | 11 February 2020 | Replaced by Rafael Vélez. |
| Juan Fuentes | Las Palmas | 4 | PSC | PSOE | Socialists | 4 February 2020 | | Replaces Elena Máñez. |
| Diego Gago | Pontevedra | 2 | PPdeG | PP | People's | 3 December 2019 | | |
| Cuca Gamarra | La Rioja | 1 | PPR | PP | People's | 3 December 2019 | | |
| Óscar Gamazo | Valencia | 4 | PPCV | PP | People's | 3 December 2019 | | |
| Mario Garcés | Huesca | 1 | PPA | PP | People's | 3 December 2019 | | |
| Alicia García | Ávila | 1 | PPCyL | PP | People's | 3 December 2019 | | |
| Carlos García | Navarre | 2 | UPN | NA+ | Mixed | 3 December 2019 | | |
| Isabel García | Madrid | 4 | PPCM | PP | People's | 3 December 2019 | | |
| Joaquín María García | Lugo | 2 | PPdeG | PP | People's | 3 December 2019 | | |
| Maria del Mar Garcia | Barcelona | 3 | Podemos | ECP | UP–ECP–GEC | 3 December 2019 | | |
| María Montserrat García | A Coruña | 3 | PSdeG | PSOE | Socialists | 3 December 2019 | | |
| Maribel García | Badajoz | 2 | PSOE–E | PSOE | Socialists | 3 December 2019 | | |
| Roberto García | Asturias | 3 | FSA | PSOE | Socialists | 3 December 2019 | | |
| Teodoro García | Murcia | 1 | PPRM | PP | People's | 3 December 2019 | | |
| Valentín García | Badajoz | 1 | PSOE–E | PSOE | Socialists | 3 December 2019 | | |
| María José García-Pelayo | Cádiz | 1 | PPA | PP | People's | 3 December 2019 | | |
| Pilar Garrido | Gipuzkoa | 1 | Podemos | UP | UP–ECP–GEC | 3 December 2019 | | |
| Ignacio Garriga | Barcelona | 1 | Vox | | Vox | 3 December 2019 | | |
| Alberto Garzón | Málaga | 1 | CPA | UP | UP–ECP–GEC | 3 December 2019 | | |
| Paloma Gázquez | Asturias | 1 | PPA | PP | People's | 3 December 2019 | | |
| Luis Gestoso | Murcia | 3 | Vox | | Vox | 3 December 2019 | | |
| Ignacio Gil | Valencia | 1 | Vox | | Vox | 3 December 2019 | | Fourth Vice-President. |
| Laura Giménez | Madrid | 3 | Indep. | Cs | Citizens | 3 December 2019 | | |
| Héctor Gómez | Santa Cruz de Tenerife | 1 | PSC | PSOE | Socialists | 3 December 2019 | | |
| Antón Gómez-Reino | A Coruña | 1 | Podemos | UP | UP–ECP–GEC | 3 December 2019 | | |
| Antonio González | Madrid | 8 | PPCM | PP | People's | 3 December 2019 | | |
| Ariagona González | Las Palmas | 3 | PSC | PSOE | Socialists | 3 December 2019 | | |
| Manuel González | Albacete | 1 | PSCM | PSOE | Socialists | 3 December 2019 | | |
| María del Carmen González | León | 2 | PPCyL | PP | People's | 3 December 2019 | | Replaces José González. |
| Marta González | A Coruña | 1 | PPdeG | PP | People's | 3 December 2019 | | |
| Miguel González | Ciudad Real | 1 | PSCM | PSOE | Socialists | 3 December 2019 | | |
| Víctor González | Salamanca | 1 | Vox | | Vox | 3 December 2019 | | |
| Josune Gorospe | Biscay | 3 | EAJ/PNV | | Basque | 3 December 2019 | | |
| Fernando Grande-Marlaska | Cádiz | 1 | PSOE–A | PSOE | Socialists | 3 December 2019 | | |
| Inés Granollers | Lleida | 2 | ERC | ERC–Sob | Republican | 3 December 2019 | | |
| Sandra Guaita | Tarragona | 2 | PSC | PSOE | Socialists | 3 December 2019 | | |
| Sonia Guerra | Barcelona | 9 | PSC | PSOE | Socialists | 4 February 2020 | | Replaces Francisco Polo. |
| María Guijarro | Biscay | 2 | PSE–EE | PSOE | Socialists | 3 December 2019 | | |
| Txema Guijarro | Alicante | 1 | Podemos | UP | UP–ECP–GEC | 3 December 2019 | | |
| Lídia Guinart | Barcelona | 5 | PSC | PSOE | Socialists | 3 December 2019 | | |
| José Guirao | Almería | 1 | PSOE–A | PSOE | Socialists | 3 December 2019 | 29 January 2020 | Replaced by Indalecio Gutiérrez. |
| Tomás Guitarte | Teruel | 1 | TE | | Plural | 3 December 2019 | | |
| Fernando Gutiérrez | Melilla | 1 | PP | PP | People's | 3 December 2019 | | |
| Indalecio Gutiérrez | Almería | 3 | PSOE–A | PSOE | Socialists | 4 February 2020 | | Replaces José Guirao. |
| Sergio Gutiérrez | Toledo | 1 | PSCM | PSOE | Socialists | 3 December 2019 | | |
| Sofía Hernanz | Balearic Islands | 2 | PSIB | PSOE | Socialists | 3 December 2019 | | Second Secretary. |
| José Alberto Herrero | Teruel | 1 | PPA | PP | People's | 3 December 2019 | | |
| Pablo Hispán | Granada | 2 | PPA | PP | People's | 3 December 2019 | | |
| Pedro Honrubia | Granada | 1 | Podemos | UP | UP–ECP–GEC | 3 December 2019 | | |
| Belén Hoyo | Valencia | 1 | PPCV | PP | People's | 3 December 2019 | | |
| Pablo Iglesias | Madrid | 1 | Podemos | UP | UP–ECP–GEC | 3 December 2019 | 26 March 2021 | Replaced by Mercedes Pérez Merino. |
| Mariona Illamola | Girona | 1 | Indep. | JxCat | Plural | 3 December 2019 | | Aligned to CNxR. |
| Héctor Illueca | Valencia | 1 | Podemos | UP | UP–ECP–GEC | 3 December 2019 | 21 January 2020 | Replaced by Rosa Medel. |
| Jon Iñarritu | Gipuzkoa | 2 | | EH Bildu | EH Bildu | 3 December 2019 | | |
| José Izquierdoz | Valladolid | 1 | PSCyL | PSOE | Socialists | 3 December 2019 | 11 February 2020 | Replaced by Julio del Valle. |
| Miguel Jerez | Balearic Islands | 2 | PPIB | PP | People's | 3 December 2019 | | |
| Beatriz Jiménez | Cuenca | 1 | PPCM | PP | People's | 3 December 2019 | | |
| Rodrigo Jiménez | Segovia | 1 | Vox | | Vox | 3 December 2019 | | |
| Teresa Jiménez-Becerril | Seville | 1 | PPA | PP | People's | 3 December 2019 | | |
| Antonia Jover | Balearic Islands | 1 | Podemos | UP | UP–ECP–GEC | 3 December 2019 | | |
| Marc Lamuà | Girona | 1 | PSC | PSOE | Socialists | 3 December 2019 | | |
| Adriana Lastra | Asturias | 1 | FSA | PSOE | Socialists | 3 December 2019 | | |
| Isaura Leal | Madrid | 11 | PSOE–M | PSOE | Socialists | 4 February 2020 | | Replaces Beatriz Corredor. |
| Sebastián Ledesma | Santa Cruz de Tenerife | 2 | PPC | PP | People's | 3 December 2019 | | |
| Mikel Legarda | Álava | 1 | EAJ/PNV | | Basque | 3 December 2019 | | |
| Fuensanta Lima | Málaga | 2 | PSOE–A | PSOE | Socialists | 3 December 2019 | | |
| Ángel López | Guadalajara | 1 | Vox | | Vox | 3 December 2019 | | |
| Cristina López | Ciudad Real | 2 | PSCM | PSOE | Socialists | 3 December 2019 | | |
| Ignacio López | Málaga | 1 | PSOE–A | PSOE | Socialists | 3 December 2019 | | |
| Juan López de Uralde | Álava | 1 | Equo | UP | UP–ECP–GEC | 3 December 2019 | | |
| Laura López | Girona | 1 | | ECP | UP–ECP–GEC | 3 December 2019 | | |
| María Teresa López | Ceuta | 1 | Vox | | Vox | 3 December 2019 | | |
| Patxi López | Biscay | 1 | PSE–EE | PSOE | Socialists | 3 December 2019 | | |
| Andrés Lorite | Córdoba | 1 | PPA | PP | People's | 3 December 2019 | | |
| José Losada | Seville | 6 | PSOE–A | PSOE | Socialists | 4 February 2020 | | Replaces Francisco Salazar. |
| Roser Maestro | Valencia | 2 | EUPV | UP | UP–ECP–GEC | 3 December 2019 | | |
| Elena Máñez | Las Palmas | 1 | PSC | PSOE | Socialists | 3 December 2019 | 22 January 2020 | Replaced by Juan Fuentes. |
| Rubén Manso | Málaga | 2 | Vox | | Vox | 3 December 2019 | | |
| Milagros Marcos | Palencia | 1 | PPCyL | PP | People's | 3 December 2019 | | |
| Pilar Marcos | Madrid | 10 | PPCM | PP | People's | 3 December 2019 | | |
| Joan Margall | Girona | 2 | ERC | ERC–Sob | Republican | 3 December 2019 | | |
| Pau Marí | Zaragoza | 2 | PSA | PSOE | Socialists | 3 December 2019 | | |
| Guillermo Mariscal | Las Palmas | 1 | PPC | PP | People's | 3 December 2019 | | |
| Manuel Mariscal | Toledo | 1 | Vox | | Vox | 3 December 2019 | | |
| Reyes Maroto | Madrid | 6 | PSOE–M | PSOE | Socialists | 3 December 2019 | | |
| María Márquez | Seville | 1 | Podemos | UP | UP–ECP–GEC | 3 December 2019 | | |
| María Marra | Pontevedra | 3 | PSdeG | PSOE | Socialists | 3 December 2019 | | |
| María Marrodán | La Rioja | 1 | PSR | PSOE | Socialists | 3 December 2019 | 11 February 2020 | Replaced by Raquel Pedraja. |
| Marta Martín | Alicante | 1 | Cs | Cs | Citizens | 3 December 2019 | | |
| Isidro Martínez Oblanca | Asturias | 2 | Foro | PP | Mixed | 3 December 2019 | | |
| María del Carmen Martínez | Cádiz | 1 | Indep. | Cs | Citizens | 3 December 2019 | | |
| María Luz Martínez Seijo | Palencia | 1 | PSCyL | PSOE | Socialists | 3 December 2019 | | |
| Valentina Martínez | A Coruña | 3 | PPdeG | PP | People's | 3 December 2019 | | |
| Juan José Matarí | Almería | 2 | PPA | PP | People's | 3 December 2019 | | |
| Jaime Mateu | Burgos | 2 | PPCyL | PP | People's | 3 December 2019 | | |
| Oskar Matute | Biscay | 1 | Alternatiba | EH Bildu | EH Bildu | 3 December 2019 | | |
| Rafael Mayoral | Madrid | 5 | Podemos | UP | UP–ECP–GEC | 3 December 2019 | | |
| José María Mazón | Cantabria | 1 | PRC | | Plural | 3 December 2019 | | |
| Rosa Medel | Valencia | 4 | Podemos | UP | UP–ECP–GEC | 4 February 2020 | | Replaces Héctor Illueca. |
| Guillermo Antonio Meijón | Pontevedra | 2 | PSdeG | PSOE | Socialists | 3 December 2019 | | |
| Joan Miquel Mena | Barcelona | 5 | EUiA | ECP | UP–ECP–GEC | 3 December 2019 | | |
| Lourdes Méndez | Murcia | 1 | Vox | | Vox | 3 December 2019 | | |
| Javier Merino Martínez | La Rioja | 2 | PPR | PP | People's | 3 December 2019 | | |
| Manuel Mestre | Alicante | 1 | Vox | | Vox | 3 December 2019 | | |
| Montse Mínguez | Lleida | 1 | PSC | PSOE | Socialists | 3 December 2019 | | |
| Sergi Miquel | Girona | 2 | PDeCAT | JxCat | Plural | 3 December 2019 | | |
| María Sandra Moneo | Burgos | 1 | PPCyL | PP | People's | 3 December 2019 | | |
| Irene Montero | Madrid | 2 | Podemos | UP | UP–ECP–GEC | 3 December 2019 | | |
| María Jesús Montero | Seville | 1 | PSOE–A | PSOE | Socialists | 3 December 2019 | | |
| Macarena Montesinos | Alicante | 2 | PPCV | PP | People's | 3 December 2019 | | |
| Pablo Montesinos | Málaga | 1 | Indep. | PP | People's | 3 December 2019 | | |
| José Montilla | Granada | 1 | PSOE–A | PSOE | Socialists | 3 December 2019 | | |
| Tristana Moraleja | A Coruña | 2 | PPdeG | PP | People's | 3 December 2019 | | |
| María Jesús Moro | Salamanca | 2 | PPCyL | PP | People's | 3 December 2019 | | |
| Diego Movellán | Cantabria | 1 | PPC | PP | People's | 3 December 2019 | | |
| Lucía Muñoz | Balearic Islands | 2 | Podemos | UP | UP–ECP–GEC | 3 December 2019 | | |
| María Muñoz | Valencia | 1 | Cs | Cs | Citizens | 3 December 2019 | | |
| María Narváez | Málaga | 4 | PSOE–A | PSOE | Socialists | 3 December 2019 | | |
| Begoña Nasarre | Huesca | 1 | PSA | PSOE | Socialists | 3 December 2019 | | |
| Carmen Navarro Lacoba | Albacete | 1 | PPCM | PP | People's | 3 December 2019 | | |
| Pedro Navarro | Zaragoza | 2 | PPA | PP | People's | 3 December 2019 | | |
| María Magdalena Nevado | Cáceres | 1 | Vox | | Vox | 3 December 2019 | | |
| Míriam Nogueras | Barcelona | 2 | PDeCAT | JxCat | Plural | 3 December 2019 | | Aligned to CNxR. |
| Joan Josep Nuet | Barcelona | 3 | CC | ERC–Sob | Republican | 3 December 2019 | | |
| Macarena Olona | Granada | 1 | Vox | | Vox | 3 December 2019 | | |
| Ana María Oramas | Santa Cruz de Tenerife | 1 | CC | CCa–PNC-NC | Plural | 3 December 2019 | | |
| Javier Ortega Smith | Madrid | 2 | Vox | | Vox | 3 December 2019 | | |
| Marina Ortega | Ourense | 1 | PSdeG | PSOE | Socialists | 3 December 2019 | | |
| José Ortiz | Cádiz | 2 | PPA | PP | People's | 3 December 2019 | | |
| Esther Padilla | Toledo | 2 | PSCM | PSOE | Socialists | 3 December 2019 | | |
| Miguel Ángel Paniagua | Palencia | 2 | PPCyL | PP | People's | 3 December 2019 | | |
| Ana Pastor | Madrid | 2 | PPCM | PP | People's | 3 December 2019 | | Second Vice-President. |
| Raquel Pedraja | La Rioja | 3 | PSR | PSOE | Socialists | | | Replaces María Marrodán. |
| Juan Luis Pedreño | Murcia | 3 | PPRM | PP | People's | 3 December 2019 | | |
| Esther Peña | Burgos | 1 | PSCyL | PSOE | Socialists | 3 December 2019 | | |
| Mercè Perea | Barcelona | 3 | PSC | PSOE | Socialists | 3 December 2019 | | |
| Adolfo Pérez | Ourense | 2 | PSdeG | PSOE | Socialists | 3 December 2019 | | |
| María Pérez | Las Palmas | 2 | PPC | PP | People's | 3 December 2019 | | |
| María Mercedes Pérez | Madrid | 6 | Podemos | UP | UP–ECP–GEC | 13 April 2021 | | Replaces Pablo Iglesias. |
| Víctor Valentín Píriz | Badajoz | 1 | PPE | PP | People's | 3 December 2019 | | |
| Gerardo Pisarello | Barcelona | 4 | BEC | ECP | UP–ECP–GEC | 3 December 2019 | | First Secretary. |
| Meri Pita | Las Palmas | 2 | Podemos | UP | UP–ECP–GEC | 4 February 2020 | | Replaces María Rosell. |
| Luis Planas | Córdoba | 1 | PSOE–A | PSOE | Socialists | 3 December 2019 | | |
| Francisco Polo | Barcelona | 2 | PSC | PSOE | Socialists | 3 December 2019 | 27 January 2020 | Replaced by Sonia Guerra. |
| Pere Joan Pons | Balearic Islands | 1 | PSIB | PSOE | Socialists | 3 December 2019 | | |
| Jesús Postigo | Segovia | 1 | PPCyL | PP | People's | 3 December 2019 | | |
| Bel Pozueta | Navarre | 1 | | EH Bildu | EH Bildu | 3 December 2019 | | |
| Ana Prieto | Lugo | 1 | PSdeG | PSOE | Socialists | 3 December 2019 | | |
| Margarita Prohens | Balearic Islands | 1 | PPIB | PP | People's | 3 December 2019 | | |
| Norma Pujol | Tarragona | 2 | ERC | ERC–Sob | Republican | 3 December 2019 | | |
| Pedro Quevedo | Las Palmas | 1 | NC | CCa–PNC-NC | Plural | 3 December 2019 | | |
| María Pilar Ramallo | Pontevedra | 1 | PPdeG | PP | People's | 3 December 2019 | | |
| Arnau Ramírez | Barcelona | 8 | PSC | PSOE | Socialists | 3 December 2019 | | |
| José Ramírez | Córdoba | 1 | Vox | | Vox | 3 December 2019 | | |
| Elvira Ramón | Granada | 2 | PSOE–A | PSOE | Socialists | 3 December 2019 | | |
| César Joaquín Ramos | Cáceres | 2 | PSOE–E | PSOE | Socialists | 3 December 2019 | | |
| José Ramos | Huelva | 2 | PSOE–A | PSOE | Socialists | 3 December 2019 | | |
| María Tamara Raya | Santa Cruz de Tenerife | 2 | PSC | PSOE | Socialists | 3 December 2019 | | |
| María Redondo | Córdoba | 2 | PPA | PP | People's | 3 December 2019 | | |
| Néstor Rego | A Coruña | 1 | UPG | BNG | Plural | 3 December 2019 | | |
| Germán Renau | Castellón | 2 | PSPV | PSOE | Socialists | 3 December 2019 | | |
| Pedro Requejo | Zamora | 1 | Vox | | Vox | 3 December 2019 | | |
| Juan Requena | Jaén | 1 | PPA | PP | People's | 3 December 2019 | | |
| Teresa Ribera | Madrid | 4 | PSOE–M | PSOE | Socialists | 3 December 2019 | | |
| Carmen Riolobos | Toledo | 2 | PPCM | PP | People's | 3 December 2019 | | |
| Joaquín Robles | Murcia | 2 | Vox | | Vox | 3 December 2019 | | |
| Margarita Robles | Ávila | 1 | Indep. | PSOE | Socialists | 3 December 2019 | | |
| Alberto Rodríguez | Santa Cruz de Tenerife | 1 | Podemos | UP | UP–ECP–GEC | 3 December 2019 | | |
| Alfonso Rodríguez | Seville | 2 | PSOE–A | PSOE | Socialists | 3 December 2019 | | First Vice-President. |
| Andrés Rodríguez | Las Palmas | 2 | Vox | | Vox | 3 December 2019 | | Replaces José Vázquez. |
| Elvira Rodríguez | Madrid | 5 | PPCM | PP | People's | 3 December 2019 | | |
| José Antonio Rodríguez | Granada | 3 | PSOE–A | PSOE | Socialists | 3 December 2019 | | |
| María Rodríguez | Huelva | 3 | PSOE–A | PSOE | Socialists | 3 December 2019 | | |
| Carlos Rojas | Granada | 1 | PPA | PP | People's | 3 December 2019 | | |
| Carmelo Romero | Huelva | 1 | PPA | PP | People's | 3 December 2019 | | |
| Rosa María Romero | Ciudad Real | 1 | PPCM | PP | People's | 3 December 2019 | | |
| María Romero | Seville | 1 | Vox | | Vox | 3 December 2019 | | |
| Susana Ros | Castellón | 1 | PSPV | PSOE | Socialists | 3 December 2019 | | |
| María Rosell | Las Palmas | 1 | Podemos | UP | UP–ECP–GEC | 3 December 2019 | 29 January 2020 | Replaced by Meri Pita. |
| Agustín Rosety | Cádiz | 1 | Vox | | Vox | 3 December 2019 | | |
| Marta Rosique | Barcelona | 6 | ERC | ERC–Sob | Republican | 3 December 2019 | | |
| Patricia Rueda | Málaga | 1 | Vox | | Vox | 3 December 2019 | | |
| Gabriel Rufián | Barcelona | 1 | ERC | ERC–Sob | Republican | 3 December 2019 | | |
| Eduardo Luís Ruiz | Alicante | 3 | Vox | | Vox | 3 December 2019 | | |
| Joan Ruiz | Tarragona | 1 | PSC | PSOE | Socialists | 3 December 2019 | | |
| María de la Cabeza Ruiz | Madrid | 4 | Vox | | Vox | 3 December 2019 | | |
| Iñaki Ruiz de Pinedo | Álava | 1 | | EH Bildu | EH Bildu | 3 December 2019 | | |
| Marisa Saavedra | Castellón | 1 | Podemos | UP | UP–ECP–GEC | 3 December 2019 | | |
| Inés Sabanés | Madrid | 3 | Equo | MP | Plural | 3 December 2019 | | Replaces Marta Higueras. |
| Pablo Sáez | Valladolid | 1 | Vox | | Vox | 3 December 2019 | | |
| Idoia Sagastizabal | Biscay | 2 | EAJ/PNV | | Basque | 3 December 2019 | | |
| Luis Carlos Sahuquillo | Cuenca | 1 | PSCM | PSOE | Socialists | 3 December 2019 | | |
| Francisco Salazar | Seville | 4 | PSOE–A | PSOE | Socialists | 3 December 2019 | 21 January 2020 | Replaced by José Losada. |
| Antonio Salvá | Balearic Islands | 1 | Vox | | Vox | 3 December 2019 | | |
| Jordi Salvador | Tarragona | 1 | ERC | ERC–Sob | Republican | 3 December 2019 | | |
| César Sánchez | Alicante | 1 | PPCV | PP | People's | 3 December 2019 | | |
| Javier Sánchez | Murcia | 1 | Podemos | UP | UP–ECP–GEC | 3 December 2019 | | Third Secretary. |
| José María Sánchez | Alicante | 2 | Vox | | Vox | 3 December 2019 | | |
| Mariano Sánchez | Badajoz | 3 | PSOE–E | PSOE | Socialists | 3 December 2019 | | |
| Marisol Sánchez | Murcia | 2 | PSRM | PSOE | Socialists | 3 December 2019 | | |
| Pedro Sánchez | Madrid | 1 | PSOE–M | PSOE | Socialists | 3 December 2019 | | |
| Víctor Sánchez | Badajoz | 1 | Vox | | Vox | 3 December 2019 | | |
| Alfredo Sancho | Huesca | 2 | PSA | PSOE | Socialists | 3 December 2019 | | |
| Herminio Sancho | Teruel | 1 | PSA | PSOE | Socialists | 3 December 2019 | | |
| Luís Santamaría | Valencia | 3 | PPCV | PP | People's | 3 December 2019 | | |
| Enrique Santiago | Madrid | 3 | IU-M | UP | UP–ECP–GEC | 3 December 2019 | | |
| Vicent Sarrià | Valencia | 3 | PSPV | PSOE | Socialists | 3 December 2019 | | |
| Pedro Saura | Murcia | 1 | PSRM | PSOE | Socialists | 3 December 2019 | | |
| Sergio Sayas | Navarre | 1 | UPN | NA+ | Mixed | 3 December 2019 | | |
| David Serrada | Salamanca | 1 | PSCyL | PSOE | Socialists | 3 December 2019 | | |
| Juan Francisco Serrano Martínez | Jaén | 3 | PSOE–A | PSOE | Socialists | 3 December 2019 | | |
| Yolanda Seva | Alicante | 4 | PSPV | PSOE | Socialists | 3 December 2019 | | |
| Felipe Jesús Sicilia | Jaén | 1 | PSOE–A | PSOE | Socialists | 3 December 2019 | | |
| Rafael Simancas | Madrid | 7 | PSOE–M | PSOE | Socialists | 3 December 2019 | | |
| Alejandro Soler Mur | Alicante | 3 | PSPV | PSOE | Socialists | 3 December 2019 | | |
| Juan Soto | Murcia | 3 | PSRM | PSOE | Socialists | 3 December 2019 | | |
| Juan Luis Steegmann | Madrid | 6 | Vox | | Vox | 3 December 2019 | | |
| Adolfo Suárez | Madrid | 3 | PPCM | PP | People's | 3 December 2019 | | Fourth Secretary. |
| Eloy Suárez | Zaragoza | 1 | PPA | PP | People's | 3 December 2019 | | |
| Susana Sumelzo | Zaragoza | 1 | PSA | PSOE | Socialists | 3 December 2019 | | |
| Carolina Telechea | Barcelona | 2 | ERC | ERC–Sob | Republican | 3 December 2019 | | |
| Vicente Tirado | Toledo | 1 | PPCM | PP | People's | 3 December 2019 | | |
| Carla Toscano | Madrid | 5 | Vox | | Vox | 3 December 2019 | | |
| Georgina Trías | Ávila | 1 | Vox | | Vox | 3 December 2019 | | |
| Edurne Uriarte | Madrid | 6 | PPCM | PP | People's | 3 December 2019 | | |
| Roberto Uriarte | Biscay | 1 | Podemos | UP | UP–ECP–GEC | 3 December 2019 | | |
| Julio Utrilla | Valencia | 3 | Vox | | Vox | 3 December 2019 | | |
| Magdalena Valerio | Guadalajara | 1 | PSCM | PSOE | Socialists | 3 December 2019 | | |
| Pilar Vallugera | Barcelona | 5 | ERC | ERC–Sob | Republican | 3 December 2019 | | |
| Ana Belén Vázquez | Ourense | 1 | PPdeG | PP | People's | 3 December 2019 | | |
| Rubén Darío Vega | Santa Cruz de Tenerife | 1 | Vox | | Vox | 3 December 2019 | | |
| Mireia Vehí | Barcelona | 1 | Endavant | CUP–PR | Mixed | 3 December 2019 | | |
| María Velarde | Córdoba | 1 | Podemos | UP | UP–ECP–GEC | 3 December 2019 | | |
| Elvira Velasco | Zamora | 1 | PPCyL | PP | People's | 3 December 2019 | | |
| Rafael Vélez | Madrid | 13 | PSOE–M | PSOE | Socialists | 18 February 2020 | | Replaces José Manuel Franco. |
| Noelia Vera | Cádiz | 1 | Podemos | UP | UP–ECP–GEC | 3 December 2019 | | |
| Daniel Vicente | Madrid | 10 | PSOE–M | PSOE | Socialists | 3 December 2019 | | |
| Aina Vidal | Barcelona | 2 | ICV | ECP | UP–ECP–GEC | 3 December 2019 | | |
| María Vilches | Albacete | 2 | PSCM | PSOE | Socialists | 3 December 2019 | | |
| Noemí Villagrasa | Zaragoza | 3 | PSA | PSOE | Socialists | 3 December 2019 | | |
| Agustín Zamarrón | Burgos | 2 | PSCyL | PSOE | Socialists | 3 December 2019 | | |
| Carlos Zambrano | Cádiz | 2 | Vox | | Vox | 3 December 2019 | | |
| José Zaragoza | Barcelona | 4 | PSC | PSOE | Socialists | 3 December 2019 | | |
| Ana María Zurita | Santa Cruz de Tenerife | 1 | PPC | PP | People's | 3 December 2019 | | |

== See also ==
- 14th Cortes Generales
- 14th Senate of Spain
