= Cañizares (surname) =

Cañizares is the surname of:

- Alejandro Cañizares (born 1983), Spanish golfer
- Antonio Cañizares Llovera (born 1945), Spanish Roman Catholic cardinal, Archbishop of Valencia
- Avelino Cañizares (1919–1993), Cuban baseball player
- Bárbaro Cañizares (born 1979), Cuban baseball player in the Mexican League
- Claude R. Canizares, Massachusetts Institute of Technology former vice president and physics professor
- Inés Cañizares (born 1970), Spanish economist and politician
- Jesús Cañizares Sánchez (born 1992), Spanish footballer
- Jorge Canizares-Esguerra, faculty member in the History Department at the University of Texas at Austin
- José de Cañizares (1676–1750), Spanish playwright, cavalry officer, public official and author
- José María Cañizares (born 1947), Spanish golfer
- Juan Cañizares Tan (1922–2005), Philippine union organizer
- Juan Manuel Cañizares (born 1966), Spanish flamenco guitarist and composer
- Miguel Navarro Cañizares (1835–1913), Spanish painter and art teacher
- Osvaldo Lara Cañizares (1955–2024), Cuban sprinter
- Santiago Cañizares (born 1969), Spanish football goalkeeper

== See also ==
- Jorge Canizares-Esguerra, Ecuadorian professor of history at the University of Texas at Austin
