= Olivar (surname) =

Olivar is a surname. Notable people with the surname include:

- Cédric Olivar (born 1995), French judoka
- Rubén Silvano Manso Olivar, Spanish economist, businessman and politician
- Tom Olivar (born 1958), Filipino actor
- Jordan Olivar (1915–1990), American football player and coach
- Max Cohen-Olivar, Moroccan racing driver
- Jérôme Cohen-Olivar, French film director and screenwriter

== See also ==
- Olivar
