= Francisco Contreras =

Francisco Contreras may refer to:

- Francisco Contreras (athlete) (1904–1949), Mexican Olympic hurdler
- Francisco Contreras (baseball) (1922–1978), Venezuelan baseball player
- Francisco Contreras (tennis) (born 1934), Mexican tennis player
- Francisco Contreras (boxer) (born 1984), Dominican professional boxer
- Francisco Contreras (footballer) (born 1999), Mexican footballer
- Francisco Jose Contreras (born 1964), Spanish jurist, professor, and politician
