= José María Sánchez García =

Spanish lawyer

José María Sánchez García MP
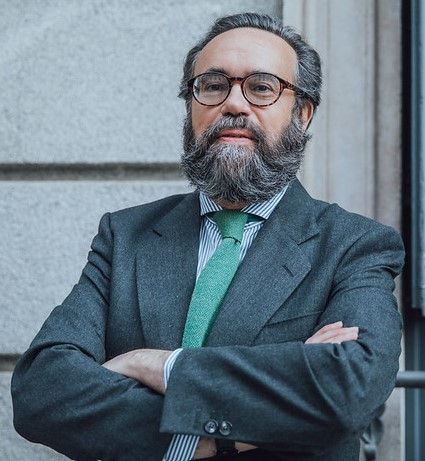

Member of the Congress of Deputies
- Incumbent
- Assumed office 10 November 2019
- Constituency: Alicante

Personal details
- Born: 11 March 1963 (age 63) Madrid
- Party: Vox
- Education: University of Bologna; University of Toulouse

José María Sánchez García (born 11 March 1963 in Madrid) is a Spanish lawyer, jurist, professor and politician who is a member of the Vox party. Since 2019 he has been a deputy in the Congress of Deputies representing the Alicante constituency.

== Biography ==
García was born in Madrid in 1963. He studied law degrees at the Collegio di Spagna campus for Spanish students affiliated to the University of Bologna and at the University of Toulouse in France. After graduating he worked as a partner at Baker McKenzie in the United States and then Olswang in London for a period. He was also a lawyer for the European Court of Justice and a high court judge in Spain but took leave of absence from the latter role after becoming a politician. García also teaches law at the University of Seville.

== Political career ==
García stood as a candidate for Vox ahead of the November 2019 Spanish general election for the Alicante constituency and was elected as a deputy for the 14th Congress of Deputies. In the Congress, he sits on the committees for Justice, Constitution and Territorial policy. He has also been a member of the cross-party commission on the COVID-19 pandemic and vaccine rollout.

During his tenure in the Congress of Deputies, García has been accused of making controversial or insulting remarks about rival politicians. During a debate on the national budget in December 2020, he referred to People's Party deputy Ana Belén Vázquez as the "Galician screamer" during a dispute. In September 2021, he allegedly called Spanish Socialist Workers' Party politician Laura Berja a "witch" during her speech on a debate on whether to criminalize protests outside abortion clinics. In 2022, García compared Spanish Prime Minister Pedro Sánchez to Hitler and Minister of the Presidency Félix Bolaños to Goebbels. After being offered to withdraw the comments by the speaker of the Congress García refused.
