= Uxía Tizón =

Spanish politician (born 1989)

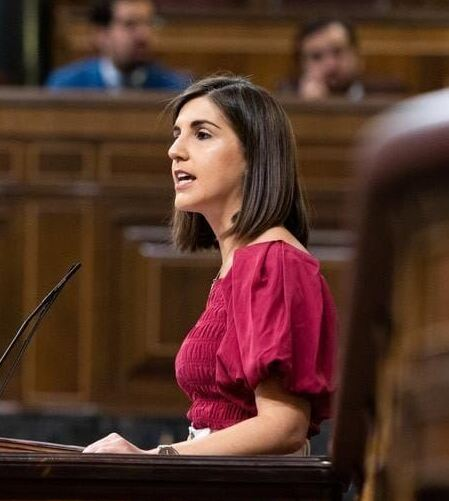
- Tizón in 2021

Member of the Congress of Deputies
- In office 25 March 2020 – 30 May 2023
- Preceded by: Marina Ortega
- Constituency: Ourense

Personal details
- Born: 22 June 1989 (age 36)
- Party: Socialists' Party of Galicia (since 2012)

Uxía Tizón Vázquez (born 22 June 1989) is a Spanish politician. From 2020 to 2023, she was a member of the Congress of Deputies. She has been a member of the Socialists' Party of Galicia since 2012.
