= Pablo Arangüena =

Spanish politician

Pablo Arangüena Fernández (born 9 March 1973) is a Spanish politician. He was a member of the Congress of Deputies between 2019 and 2020.

He has sat in the Parliament of Galicia since 2020.

== See also ==
- 13th Congress of Deputies
- 14th Congress of Deputies
