= Rafaela Crespín Rubio =

Spanish politician (born 1976)

Rafaela Crespín Rubio (born 5 December 1976) is a Spanish politician from the Spanish Socialist Workers' Party. In the 2019 Spanish general election she was elected to the Congress of Deputies in Córdoba. She was re-elected in 2023. In 2021, she was appointed general secretary of the Socialist Parliamentary Group.

== See also ==
- 14th Congress of Deputies
- 15th Congress of Deputies
