= José Antonio Rodríguez Salas =

Spanish politician

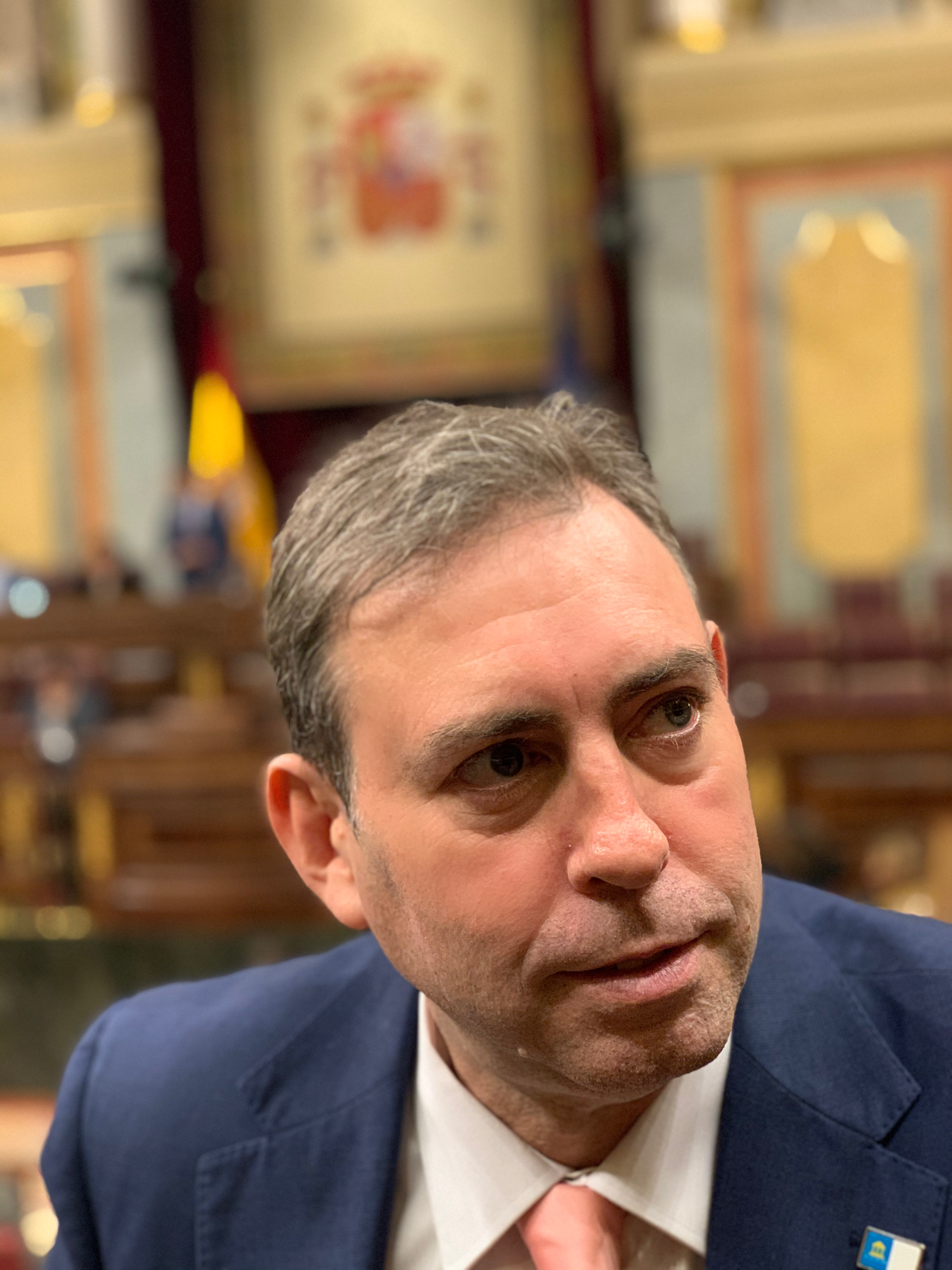
- José Antonio Rodríguez Salas (2020)

Congress of Deputies
- Incumbent
- Assumed office 30 April 2019
- Constituency: Granada

Senior Advisor to the President of the Government of Spain
- In office 17 September 2018 – 13 May 2019

Mayor of Jun
- In office 16 March 2005 – 17 September 2018
- Preceded by: Antonio Rodríguez Ruiz
- Succeeded by: Aurora Suárez Muñoz

Deputy for the Provincial Council of Granada
- In office October 2006 – July 2007

Personal details
- Born: 20 October 1965 (age 60) Spain, Beas de Granada
- Party: PSOE
- Education: University of Granada
- Profession: Politician

José Antonio Rodríguez Salas is a Spanish politician from the Spanish Socialist Party (PSOE). He was the Mayor of Jun, a town in the Metropolitan Area of Granada, from March 2005 to September 2018, and one of the candidates running for the first primary elections held in Andalusia by the PSOE in 2013. Since September 2018 he has been a senior advisor at the Presidency of the Government of Spain.

Member of the Spanish Congress of Deputies representing the Constituency of Granada during the XIII and XIV Legislatures after the general elections held on 28 April 2019 and 10 November 2019.

== Career ==
He was the Deputy Mayor of Jun from June 1991 to 2005. In 2005 he was elected Mayor of Jun in a council plenary session. He later validated this position in the town elections of 2007, 2011 and 2015. In 2013 he announced his candidacy as Secretary-General for the first primary elections held by The Andalusian Socialist Party.

On 17 September 2018 he resigned from his position as the Mayor of Jun to join the Presidency of the Government of Spain working as a senior advisor.

After the past Spanish General Elections held on 28 April 2019 and 10 November 2019, he has been a Member of the Congress of Deputies representing the Constituency of Granada, Spain, during the XIII and XIV Legislatures.

== Positions held ==
- Deputy Mayor of Jun (1991–2005)
- Mayor of Jun (2005–2018)
- Deputy for the Provincial Council of Granada (2006–2007)
- Member of the Federal Committee of the Spanish Socialist Workers Party (PSOE, 2017–present)
- Senior Advisor to the Presidency of the Government of Spain (2018–2019)
- Member of the Congress of Deputies from the Constituency of Granada (2019–present)

== Twitter Town Project ==
He is currently working with the Massachusetts Institute of Technology (MIT) and its Laboratory for Social Machines, directed by Deb Roy, in an ambitious project that aims to study Jun's open government through the social network Twitter. The ultimate goal is to extrapolate this initiative to several North American cities, as explained in an article on Medium. In this article, the project directors, Deb Roy and William Powers, explain the new concept of mutual visibility between the citizens and the administration, which implies the empowerment of civil servants in what Rodríguez Salas calls "Society of the Minute". Citizens ask politicians and employees direct questions and await quick answers.

Preceded by Antonio Rodriguez Ruiz	Mayor of Jun, Granada; 2005–2018	Succeeded by Aurora Suárez
Preceded by	Deputy for the County Council of Granada; 2006–2007	Succeeded by
Preceded by Position created	Executive Secretary of Social Revitalization Techniques of the Spanish Socialist Workers Party; 2017–present	Incumbent
Preceded by Position created	Senior Advisor to the Presidency of the Government of Spain; 2018–2019	Incumbent
Preceded by	Member of the Congress of Deputies from Granada; 2019-present	Incumbent
