= Cristina Esteban =

Spanish politician (born 1976)

Cristina Esteban MP

Member of the Congress of Deputies
- Incumbent
- Assumed office 21 May 2019
- Constituency: Valencia

Personal details
- Born: 5 November 1976 (age 49)
- Party: Vox
- Education: Complutense University of Madrid

Cristina Alicia Esteban Calonje (born 5 November 1976) is a Spanish politician who is a member of the 14th Congress of Deputies from the Vox party.

Cristina Esteban Calonje is an asset manager at BBVA Bank in Madrid, where she manages investment funds and pension plans. She speaks German and English. She is married to Antonio Vallejo-Nágera Deroulede, a real estate businessman, and has two children.
