= Luis Gestoso de Miguel =

Spanish politician (born 1962)

Luis Gestoso de Miguel MP
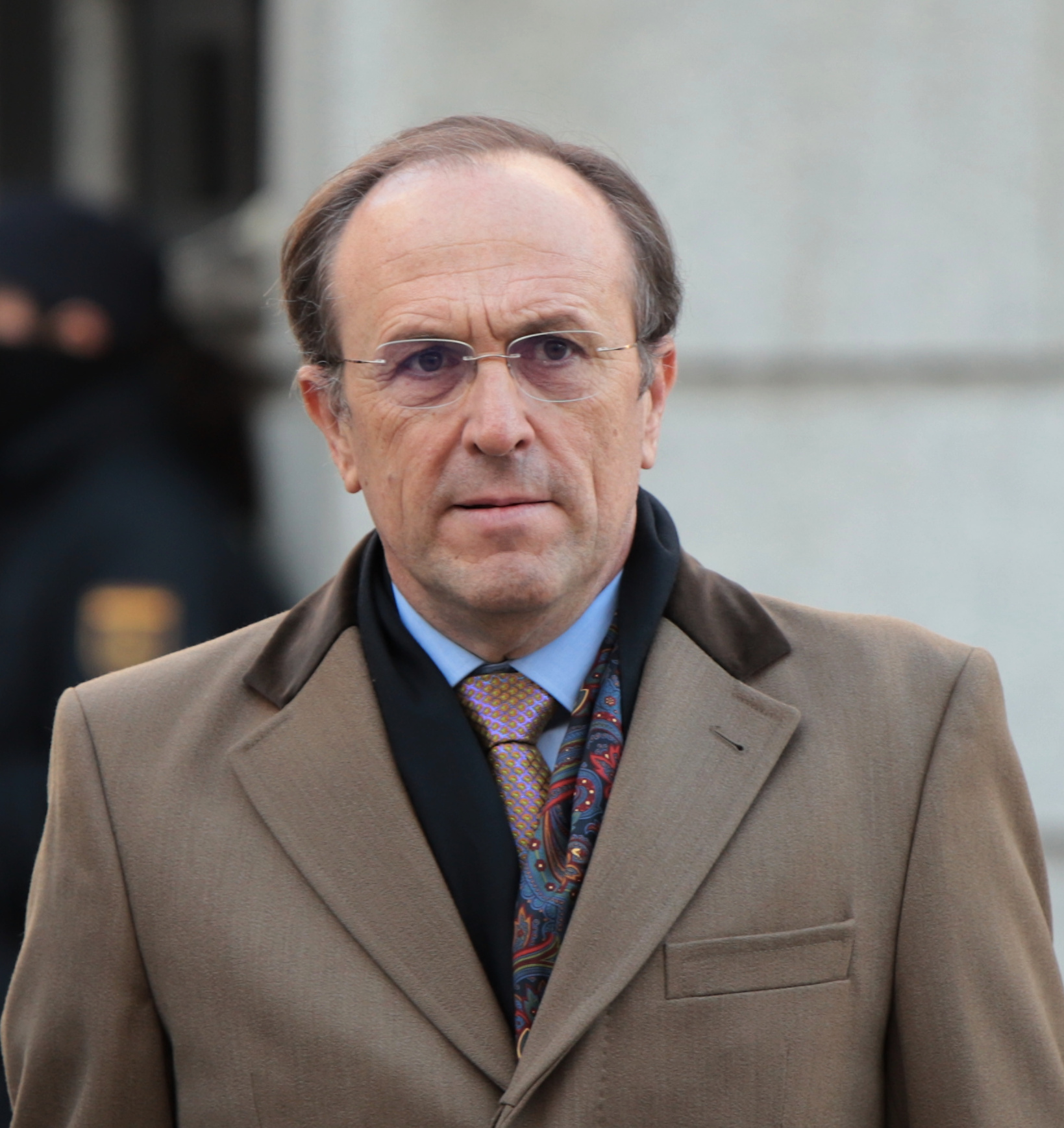

Member of the Congress of Deputies
- Incumbent
- Assumed office 21 May 2019
- Constituency: Murcia

Personal details
- Born: 20 December 1962 (age 63) Cartagena
- Party: Vox (2015-present); People's Party (before 2015)
- Education: Naval Military Academy

Luis Gestoso de Miguel (born December 20, 1962) is a Spanish politician for the Vox party. He has been a member of the Congress of Deputies since 2019 for the Murcia constituency.

== Biography ==
Miguel was born in Cartagena in 1962. He grew up in various parts of Spain, including Palma de Mallorca and Alicante due to his father's job as a magistrate. He was educated at a Jesuit school in Alicante before starting a law degree at the University of Murcia. However, he switched his studies to the Naval Military Academy and became a reservist in the Spanish navy. He also worked as an environmental consultant to various companies in Spain and abroad.

Outside of politics, he is a motorcycle enthusiast and rides a former NYPD Harley-Davidson. Pertenece a la Asociación Privada de Files de la Iglesia Católica "Orden de los Pobres Caballeros de Cristo", dedicada a obras de caridad y ayuda al necesitado.

== Political career ==
Miguel was a member of the People's Party (PP) for thirty years and became a friend of future Vox leader Santiago Abascal during their time in the Basque branch of the PP. After this, he tries to join to Ciudadanos, but he has to resign after being investigated by corruption In the Spanish general election of May 2019, Miguel was elected to the Congress of Deputies for Murcia and is the regional chairman of Vox in the province.
