= Omar Anguita =

Spanish politician (born 1990)

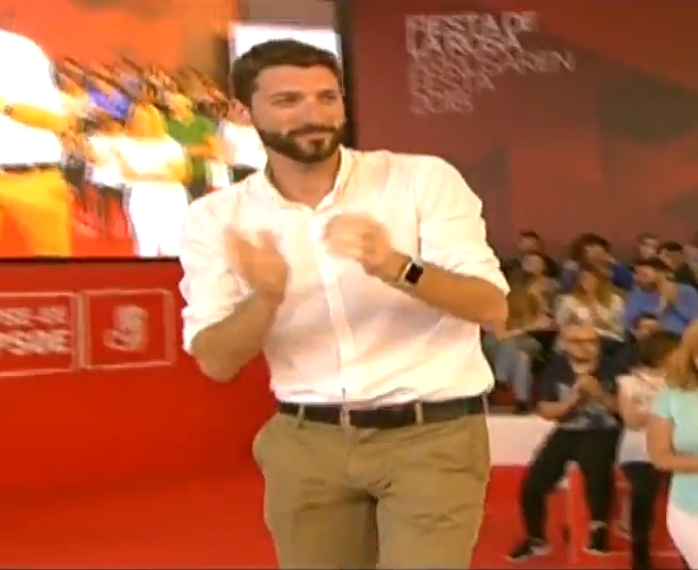
- Anguita in 2018

Member of the Congress of Deputies
- In office 4 February 2020 – 17 August 2023
- Constituency: Madrid

Personal details
- Born: 3 November 1990 (age 35)
- Party: Spanish Socialist Workers' Party

Omar Anguita Pérez (born 3 November 1990) is a Spanish politician. From 2020 to 2023, he was a member of the Congress of Deputies. From 2017 to 2021, he served as secretary general of the Socialist Youth of Spain.
