= Pablo Juan Calvo Liste =

Spanish lawyer and politician

Pablo Juan Calvo Liste MP

Member of the Congress of Deputies
- Incumbent
- Assumed office 10 November 2019
- Constituency: León

Personal details
- Born: 17 February 1965 (age 61)
- Party: Vox
- Education: University of Alcalá

Pablo Juan Calvo Liste (born 17 February 1965) is a Spanish lawyer and politician who has been a member of the Congress of Deputies since November 2019 for the Vox party.

Liste completed a degree in law at the University of Alcalá and worked as an attorney-at-law. Spanish newspaper Heraldo de Aragón noted Liste as one of fifteen Vox deputies who come from a legal background.

Ahead of the November 2019 Spanish general election, Liste was announced as Vox's number one candidate for the León constituency. He was accordingly elected as a deputy to the Congress of Deputies. In parliament, Liste sits on the Finance and Civil Service Commission and committee for childcare.
