= Rubén Darío (politician) =

Spanish civil servant, professor and politician

Rubén Darío MP

Member of the Congress of Deputies
- Incumbent
- Assumed office 21 May 2019
- Constituency: Santa Cruz de Tenerife

Personal details
- Born: Rubén Dario Vega Arias; 10 May 1960 (age 66)
- Party: Vox
- Education: University of Oviedo

Rubén Darío Vega Arias is a Spanish civil servant, professor and politician for the Vox party. He has been a member of the Congress of Deputies since 2019.

== Biography ==
Dario has described himself as a long-term resident of La Palma. He was a sailor in the Spanish Merchant Navy, rising to the position of Captain and also worked as a harbor pilot in La Palma for five years. After retiring from the Marchant Navy, he completed a PhD at the University of Oviedo and worked as a civil servant for the Parliament of the Canary Islands' division of the Ministry of Agriculture, Livestock and Fisheries. He also teaches at the Maritime Fishing Professional Training Institute.

== Political career ==
Dario claims that he became politically active over what he felt was indifference towards the Canary Islands by the European Union and the government of Pedro Sánchez, arguing that the Sánchez government had not included any financial provisions for the Islands in the 2022 budget but instead had spent more money in foreign aid.

Dario stood for election for the Santa Cruz de Tenerife constituency on the party list for Vox and was elected to the Congress of Deputies in April 2019. He was re-elected in November 2019. He is also Vox's spokesman on agricultural affairs.
