= José María Figaredo =

Spanish politician (born 1988)

José María Figaredo MP
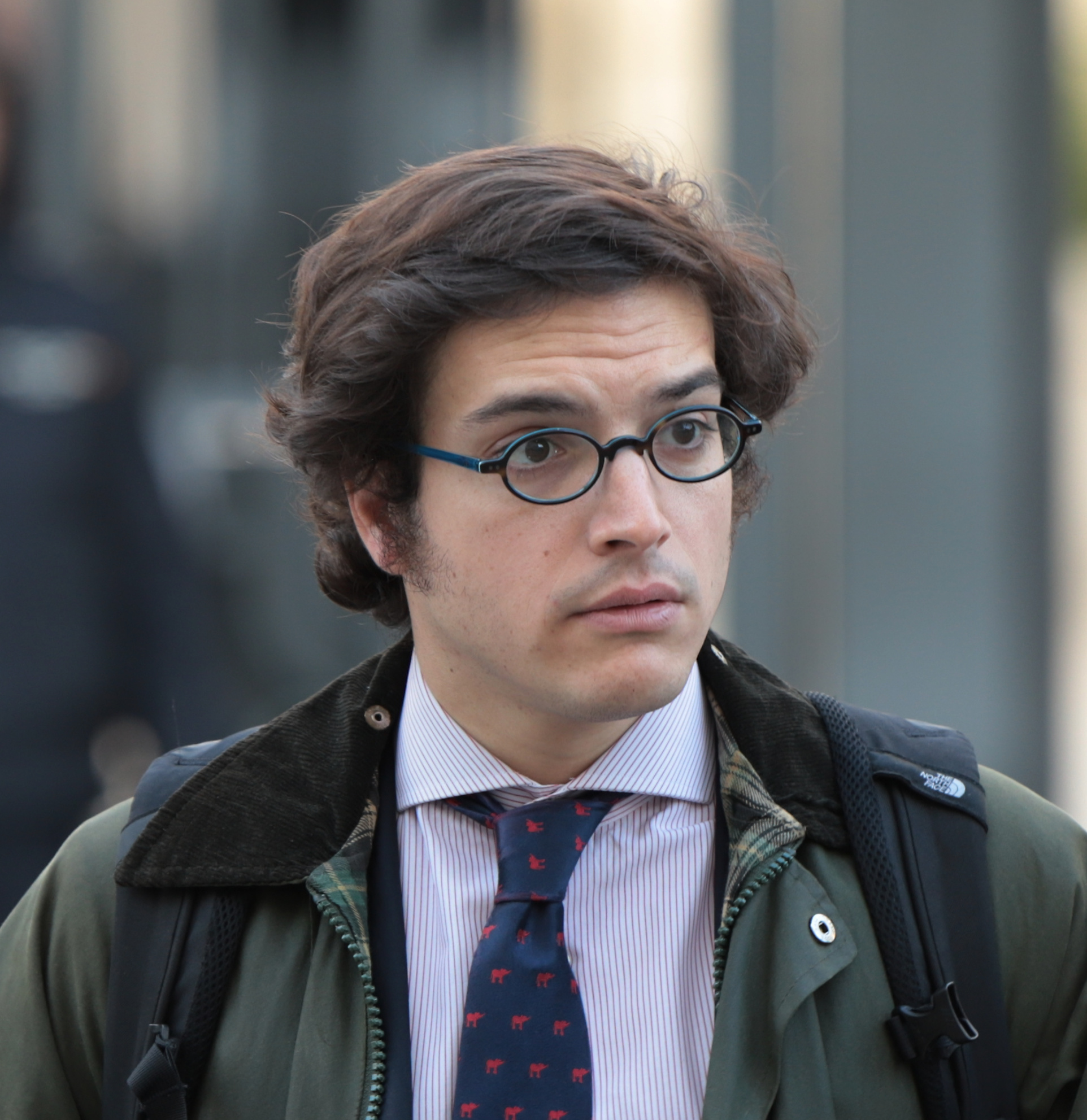

Member of the Congress of Deputies
- Incumbent
- Assumed office 21 May 2019
- Constituency: Asturias

Personal details
- Born: 26 June 1988 (age 37) Gijón
- Party: Vox

José María Figaredo (born June 26, 1988) is a Spanish politician and a member of the Congress of Deputies for Vox representing the Asturias constituency.
