= Rodrigo Jiménez Revuelta =

Spanish politician

Rodrigo Jiménez Revuelta MP

Member of the Congress of Deputies
- Incumbent
- Assumed office 10 November 2019
- Constituency: Segovia

Personal details
- Born: 23 October 1972 (age 53)
- Party: Se Acabó la Fiesta
- Education: Autonomous University of Madrid

Rodrigo Jiménez Revuelta (born 23 October 1972) is a Spanish politician for the Vox who has been a member of the Congress of Deputies since November 2019.

Revuelta studied business administration at the Autonomous University of Madrid followed by master's degrees in finance from the Center for Financial Studies and family science from the John Paul II Pontifical Theological Institute for Marriage and Family Sciences. According to some media reports, he is a member of Opus Dei in Segovia.

Revuelta has been the party secretary and treasurer of Vox in Segovia. During the November 2019 Spanish general election, he was elected to the Congress of Deputies for the Segovia constituency.
