= María Teresa López Álvarez =

Spanish politician

Teresa López MP

Member of the Congress of Deputies
- Incumbent
- Assumed office November 10, 2019
- Constituency: Ceuta

Personal details
- Born: María Teresa López Álvarez; 14 May 1980 (age 46) Ceuta
- Party: Vox
- Education: University of Seville

María Teresa López Álvarez (born 14 May 1980) is a Spanish journalist, broadcaster, activist and politician.

In 2019, she was elected to the Congress of Deputies for the Vox.

== Biography ==
López was born in Ceuta in May 1980. Her father was a policeman and prison officer who was the head warden of the Salto del Negro prison in Las Palmas de Gran Canaria. In 1992, he was targeted for an assassination attempt by the Basque separatist-terrorist group ETA via a letter bomb. López has stated that the incident was a catalyst for her later involvement in politics.

López studied information science and journalism at the University of Seville from 1998 to 2003. She then worked as a journalist and presenter on the radio stations Radio Ceuta-Cadena SER and Punto Radio Cádiz. In 2006, she returned to Ceuta and joined Public Radio (RTVCE) where she presented the news until 2012.

== Political career ==
In 2000, López became a campaigner for the Andalusian branch of the Asociación de Víctimas del Terrorismo (AVT), an association created by victims of terrorist attacks. She held this position until 2005 when she became the chief delegate of the AVT's wing in Ceuta.

She worked as an advisor to the Vox parliamentary group in Ceuta before standing for the party in the Spanish general election of November 2019. She was subsequently elected to the Congress of Deputies for the Ceuta constituency.

In parliament, López has called for the construction of a wall to stop illegal immigrants from crossing into Ceuta and Melilla from Morocco.
