= Magdalena Nevado =

Spanish businesswoman and politician

Maria Magdalena Nevado del Campo MP
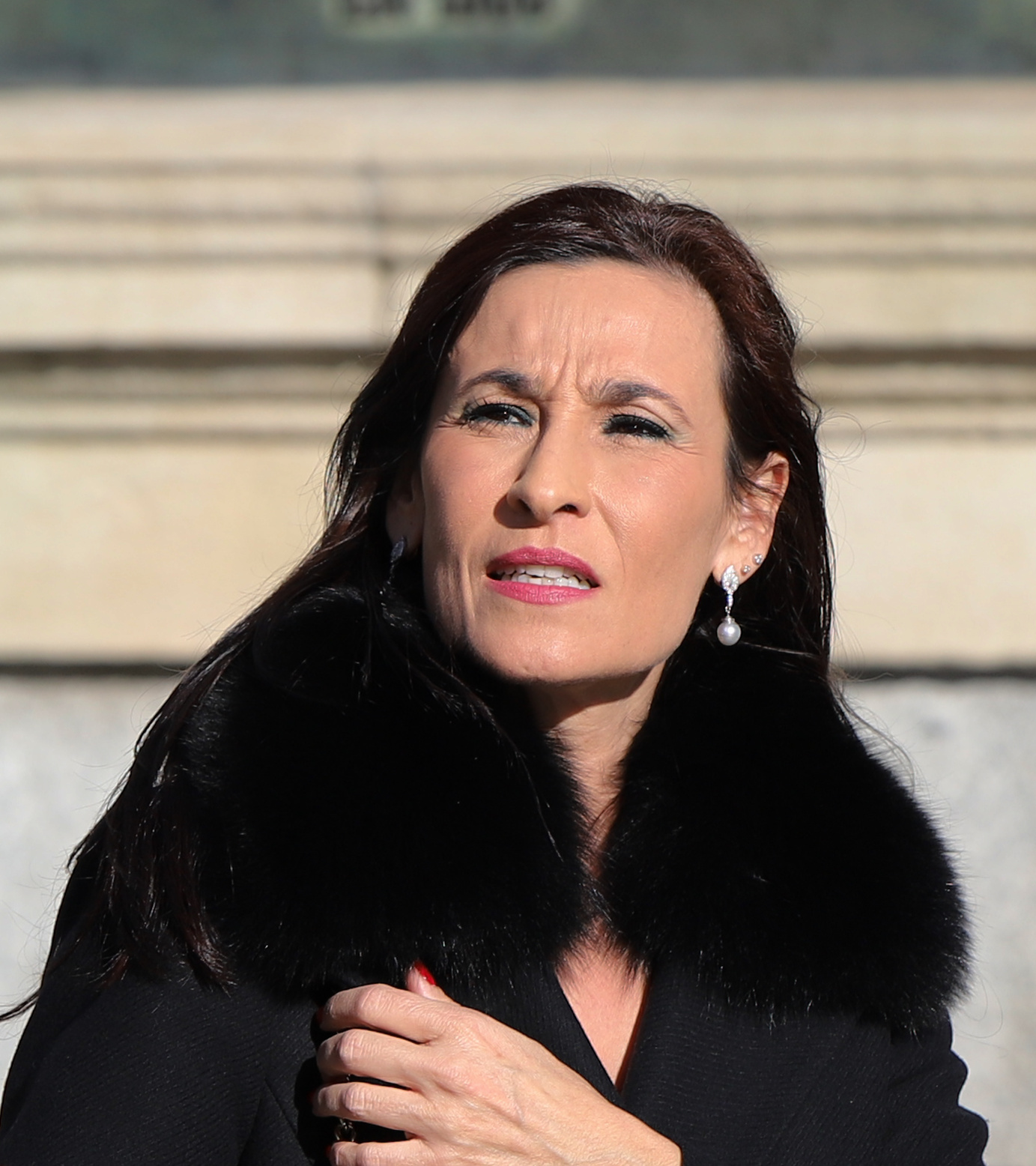
- del Campo at the Congress of Deputies January 2020

Member of the Congress of Deputies
- Incumbent
- Assumed office 21 May 2019
- Constituency: Cáceres

Personal details
- Born: 28 May 1973 (age 53) Cáceres
- Party: Vox
- Education: University of Extremadura

Maria Magdalena Nevado del Campo (born May 28, 1973, in Cáceres) is a Spanish politician, entrepreneur and a member of the Congress of Deputies for the Vox party.

== Biography ==
del Campo is a native of the Cáceres region where she was born in 1973. After leaving high school, she worked as a human resources manager for a pharmaceutical company before founding a business. She subsequently studied for a degree in law, followed by a Master's in political science as a mature student.

She has described herself as becoming politically active as a teenager and was a member of the Spanish pro-life organization ProVida but was not a member of any political parties prior to joining Vox. She has also described concerns for the countryside as another factor for her involvement in politics.

Ahead of the April 2019 Spanish general election, del Campo was placed on Vox's list for the Cáceres constituency for the Congress of Deputies. She was elected and sworn in as a deputy the following month. She was again re-elected in the subsequent November 2019 general election. In the Congress, she has spoken on matters related to the environment and rural affairs. Along with other Vox deputies, she has called for changes to the UN's Sustainable Development Goals (Agenda 2030), arguing that Spain should protect its sovereignty by adopting its own methods to achieve the Agenda 2030 goals and accused the UN of "creating blacklists to control those who do not share globalism." She furthermore argued that the UN's policies would damage the Spanish dehesa and cause draughts for farmers. del Campo has also criticized media commentary that has referred to Vox as an extreme-right party, arguing that the concepts of left and right are outdated.

del Campo became the source of some debate when Spanish news website El Plural uncovered an audio recording dated from 2019 of her making controversial statements and joking about shooting a colleague.

She is the sister of former Spanish senator Elena Nevado del Campo who has served as the mayor of Cáceres for the People's Party.
