= Mariona Illamola =

Catalan academic and politician

Member of the Congress of Deputies of Spain
- Incumbent
- Assumed office 3 December 2019
- Constituency: Girona

Personal details
- Born: Mariona Illamola i Dausà; 11 January 1967 (age 59) Tossa de Mar, Catalonia, Spain
- Party: Independent
- Other political affiliations: Together for Catalonia
- Education: University of Navarra; Université catholique de Louvain; University of Girona
- Occupation: Academic

Mariona Illamola i Dausà (born 11 January 1967) is a Catalan academic, politician and a member of the Congress of Deputies of Spain.

== Early life ==
Illamola was born on 11 January 1967 in Tossa de Mar, Catalonia. She has a degree in law from the University of Navarra (1990). She has a special degree in international and European law from the Université catholique de Louvain (1991) and a doctorate in law from the University of Girona (2001).

== Career ==
Illamola is an associate professor at the University of Girona's Department of Public Law, specialising in public international law and international relations. She is the co-ordinator for the university's master's programme on advocacy. She was director of the university's Centro de Documentación Europea (2006-2019) and Europe Direct Girona (2013-2019). She was also head of the bar association of Girona, Figueres and Vic (2013-2016). She is a member of the Asociación Española de Profesores de Derecho Internacional y Relaciones Internacionales (AEPDIRI) and Asociación para la Investigación del Derecho de Asilo y Migratorio (AIDAM).

Illamola contested the November 2019 general election as an independent Together for Catalonia electoral alliance candidate in the Province of Girona and was elected to the Congress of Deputies.

== Electoral history ==
Electoral history of Mariona Illamola
Election	Constituency	Party	Alliance	No.	Result
2019 November general	Province of Girona	Independent	Together for Catalonia	1	Elected
