= Javier Merino Martínez =

Spanish politician (born 1979)

Member of the Congress of Deputies
- Incumbent
- Assumed office 3 December 2019
- Constituency: La Rioja

Personal details
- Born: 18 January 1979 (age 47)
- Party: People's Party

Javier Merino Martínez (born 18 January 1979) is a Spanish politician serving as a member of the Congress of Deputies since 2019. From 2006 to 2011, he served as director general of the Institute of Youth of La Rioja.
