= Carlos José Zambrano García-Raez =

Spanish lawyer and politician

Carlos José Zambrano García-Raez (born 23 February 1969) is a Spanish lawyer and politician, member of the Congress of Deputies since 2019.

He was born in San Fernando, Cádiz and got a degree in Laws. He is the grandson of Francisco García-Ráez, mayor of Cádiz under the Franco regime. Before joining Vox, he was a member of the People's Party. In the November 2019 general election he was number 2 in the candidature of right Vox for the Province of Cádiz and won a seat in the Congress.

On 11 March 2020, during the ongoing coronavirus pandemic, he became the second lawmaker confirmed with SARS-CoV-2.
