= Antonio Salvá =

Spanish politician and urologist

Antonio Salvá Verd

Member of the Congress of Deputies
- Incumbent
- Assumed office 3 December 2019
- Constituency: Balearic Islands

Personal details
- Born: 24 April 1952 (age 73) Spain
- Party: Vox
- Profession: Urologist, politician

Antonio Salvá Verd (born 24 April 1952), is a Spanish politician and urologist, a member of the Congress of Deputies for the Balearic Islands since 2019.

He was the father of Diego Salvá, a Civil Guard killed in a bomb attack by ETA in 2010, and brother and uncle of three victims in the 1987 Zaragoza Barracks bombing.

He was a candidate of right Vox in the November 2019 Spanish general election and won a seat. He ran unsuccessfully for a seat in the Senate for Mallorca in the April 2019 Spanish general election.

On 14 March 2020, during the ongoing coronavirus pandemic, he announced that he was infected by SARS-CoV-2.
