= Emilio del Valle =

Spanish politician (born 1960)

Emilio del Valle MP

Member of the Congress of Deputies
- Incumbent
- Assumed office 21 May 2019
- Constituency: Cantabria

Personal details
- Born: 26 December 1960 (age 65) Madrid, Kingdom of Spain
- Party: Vox
- Education: Complutense University of Madrid

Emilio del Valle (born 26 December 1960) is a Spanish politician and a member of the Congress of Deputies for the Vox party. He was previously Minister of the Presidency for the Government of Cantabria.

del Valle studied law at the Complutense University of Madrid and was head of the General Heritage Administration Service for the Government of Cantabria. In the 1995 regional elections in Cantabria, del Valle became Minister of the Presidency under José Joaquín Martínez Sieso's cabinet. He held this position until 1999.

In March 2019, he announced he would head the list for the Cantabria constituency for the Congress of Deputies for Vox. He was subsequently elected as a deputy in the elections of November 2019.
