= Pablo Hispán =

Spanish politician (born 1973)

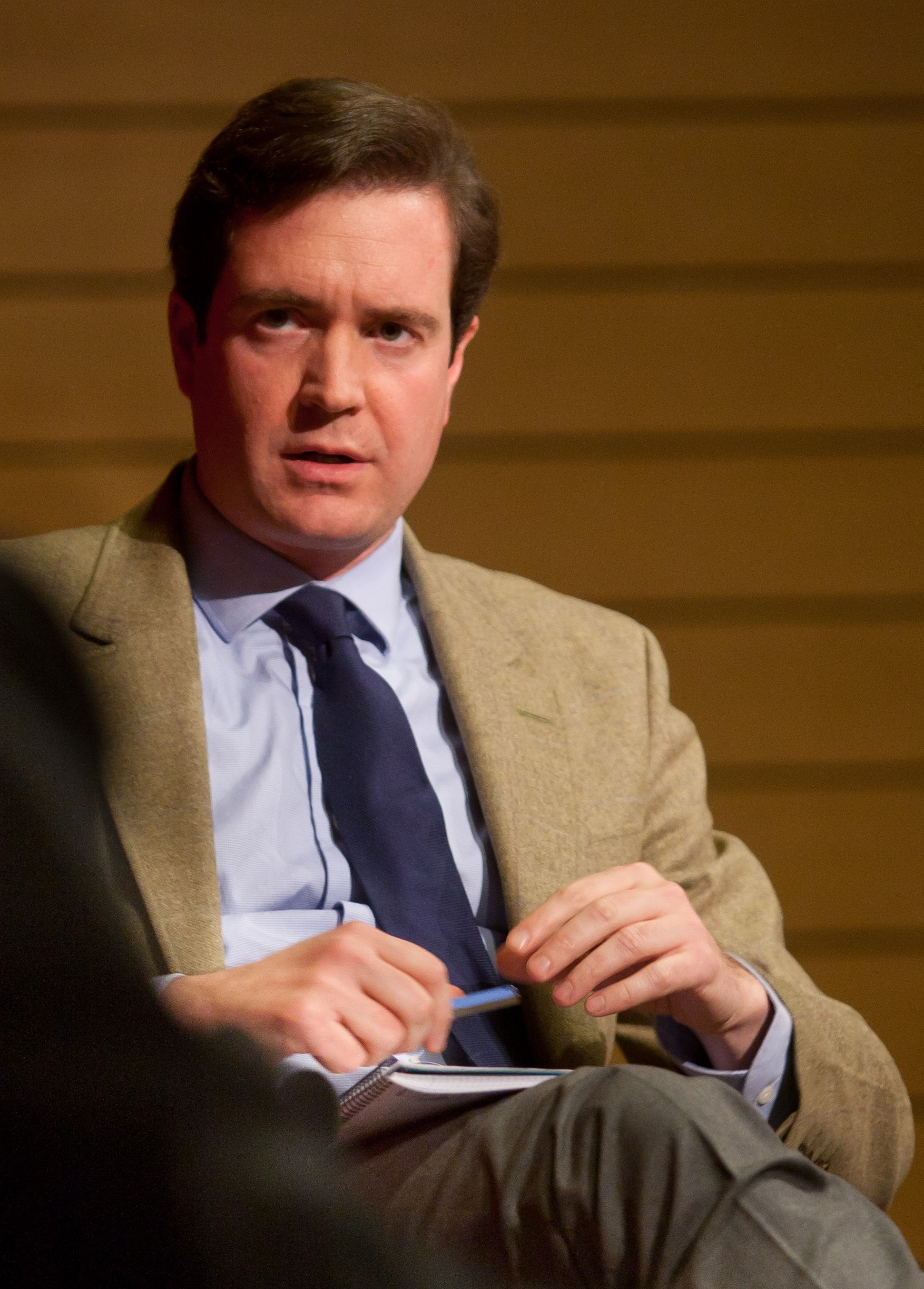
- Hispán in 2015

Member of the Congress of Deputies
- Incumbent
- Assumed office 3 December 2019
- Constituency: Granada

Personal details
- Born: 12 November 1973 (age 52)
- Party: People's Party

Pablo Hispán Iglesias de Ussel (born 12 November 1973) is a Spanish politician serving as a member of the Congress of Deputies since 2019. He has been a member of the Parliamentary Assembly of the Council of Europe since 2021.
