= Alberto Asarta =

Spanish military officer and politician

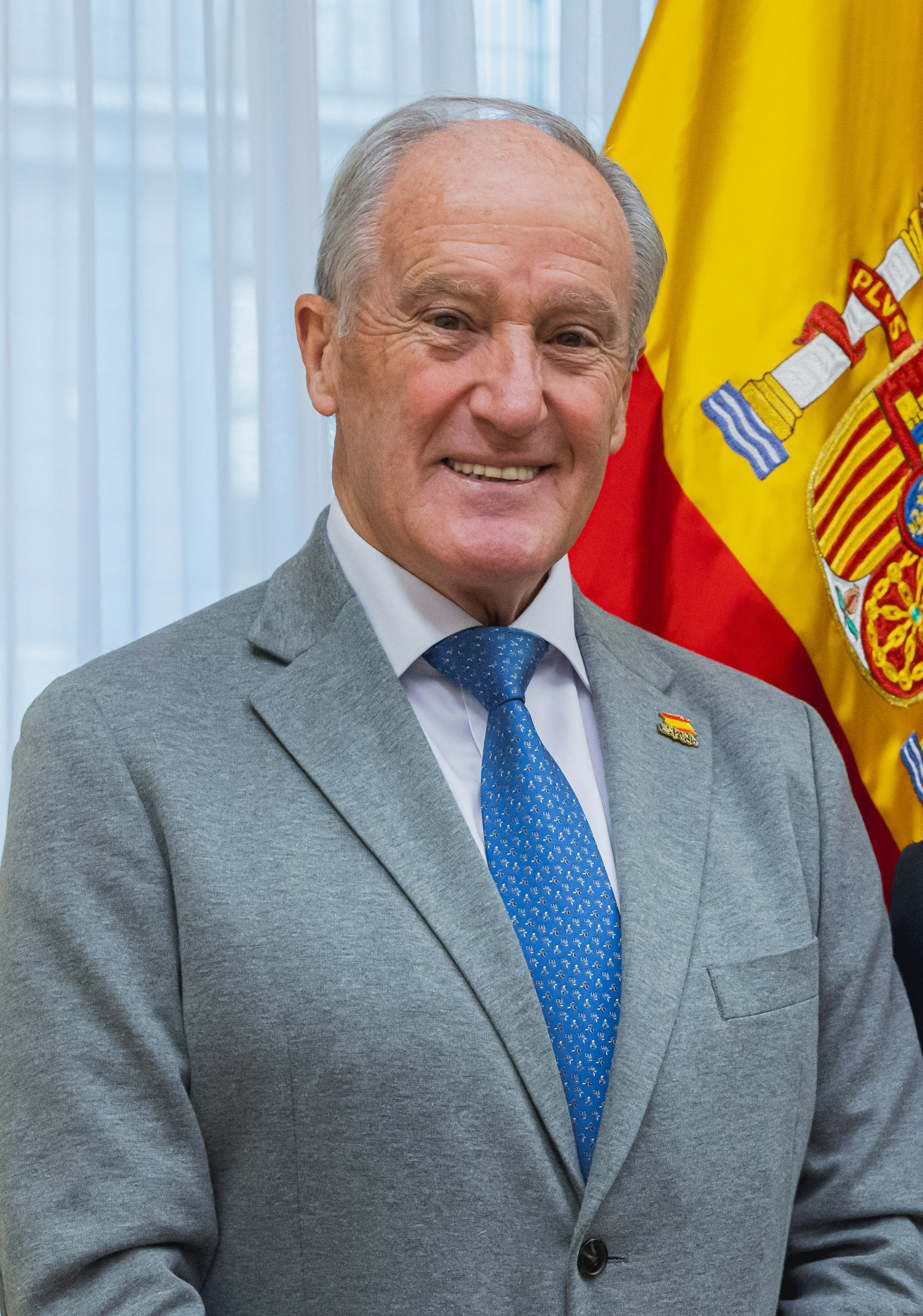
- Born: Alberto Asarta; 1951 (age 74–75); Zaragoza
- Occupations: Military officer; Politician

Alberto Teófilo Asarta Cuevas (born Zaragoza, 1951) is a Spanish military officer and politician. He was promoted to Major General in July 2009, and he has participated in United Nations peacekeeping missions in El Salvador, Bosnia-Herzegovina and Lebanon and in the multi-national force deployed in the Iraq War. He has served as Force Commander of UNIFIL from January 28, 2010, until January 28, 2012.

== Military career ==
During the first half of 2004, and with the rank of colonel, Asarta was second in charge of the contingent of 1,300 men sent by the Spanish government in the multinational force deployed in the Iraq War, commanded by General Fulgencio Coll. There, he was responsible for the security of the cantonments of Diwaniyah and Najaf, which had to fight against Iraqi insurgents in one of the greatest periods of hostilities. Subsequently, he was given command of the operation of troop withdrawal Spanish Iraq, produced in May of that year.

He ran 1st in the list of Vox in Castellón vis-à-vis the November 2019 Congressional election, and became a member of the Lower House of the Spanish Parliament.
