= José Ortiz Galván =

Spanish politician (born 1983)

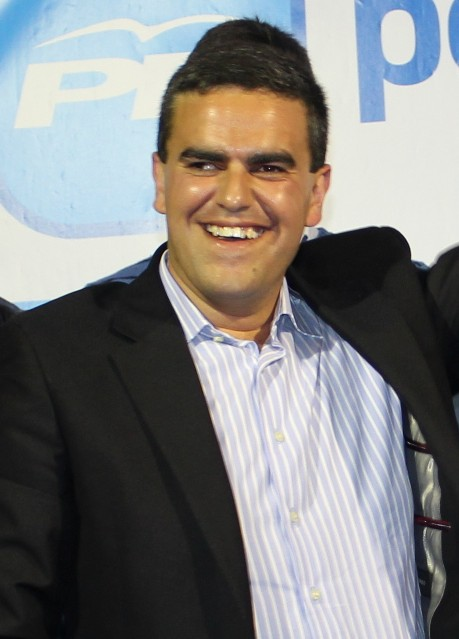

Member of the Congress of Deputies
- In office 4 December 2019 – 30 May 2023
- Constituency: Cádiz

Member of the Senate
- In office 13 January 2016 – 20 May 2019
- Constituency: Cádiz

Personal details
- Born: 16 November 1983 (age 42)
- Party: People's Party

José Ortiz Galván (born 16 November 1983) is a Spanish politician. From 2019 to 2023, he was a member of the Congress of Deputies. From 2016 to 2019, he was a member of the Senate. From 2011 to 2019, he served as mayor of Vejer de la Frontera.
