= Sonia Guerra =

Spanish politician (born 1977)

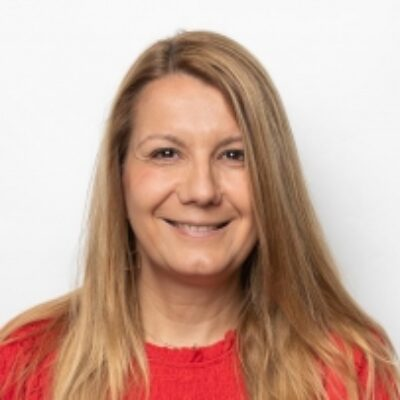
- Guerra in 2023

Member of the Congress of Deputies
- In office 4 February 2020 – 27 August 2024
- Preceded by: Francisco Polo
- Succeeded by: Andrea Canelo Matito
- Constituency: Barcelona
- In office 21 May 2019 – 24 September 2019
- Constituency: Barcelona

Personal details
- Born: 9 January 1977 (age 49)
- Party: Socialists' Party of Catalonia

Sonia Guerra López (born 9 January 1977) is a Spanish politician serving as secretary general of equality and feminism of Catalonia since 2024. She was a member of the Congress of Deputies from May to September 2019 and from 2020 to 2024.
