= Eduardo Luis Ruiz Navarro =

Spanish politician

Eduardo Luis Ruiz Navarro MP

Member of the Congress of Deputies
- Incumbent
- Assumed office 10 November 2019
- Constituency: Alicante

Personal details
- Born: Eduardo Luis Ruiz Navarro; 5 December 1972 (age 53)
- Party: Vox
- Education: University of Alicante

Eduardo Luis Ruiz Navarro (born 5 December 1972) is a Spanish politician for the Vox party and a member of the Congress of Deputies for the Alicante constituency.

Navarro holds a law degree and worked for the Ministry of Justice and is a member of the State Lawyers Corps. He has also been a lecturer in law at the University of Alicante and Universidad CEU San Pablo. Navarro has cited his opposition to the separatist terrorist group ETA as his motivation for involvement in politics and joined Vox having previously voted for the People's Party and Citizens in response to what he describes as the adoption of "gender ideology" and globalism by the other parties in Spain.

During the November 2019 Spanish general election, Navarro was elected to the Congress of Deputies representing Alicante and was one of three Vox deputies elected to represent the region. In the Congress, Navarro sits on the committees for Justice and fighting Corruption. He has also acted as one of Vox's spokespeople on law and order issues, and has called for tougher laws against squatting and illegal occupation of private buildings.
