= Mercedes Pérez Merino =

Spanish politician (born 1960)

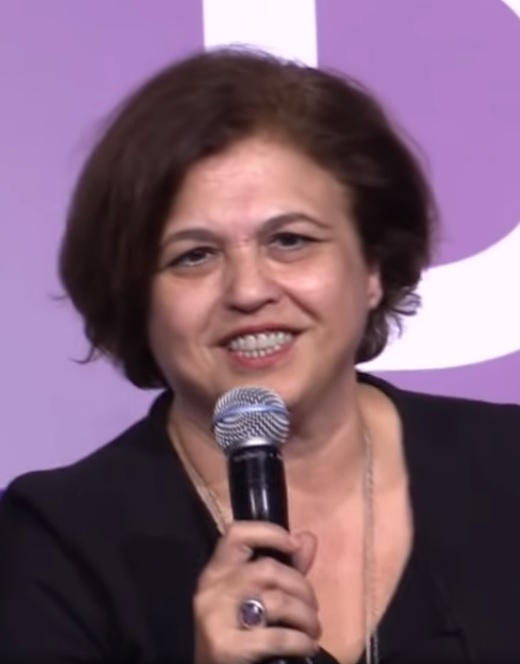
Mercedes Pérez Merino in 2019.

María Mercedes Pérez Merino (born 18 November 1960) is a Spanish trade unionist and politician from Podemos. In 2021, she joined the Cortes Generales, replacing Pablo Iglesias Turrión.
