= María Ruiz Solás =

Spanish politician (born 1970)

María Ruiz Solás MP
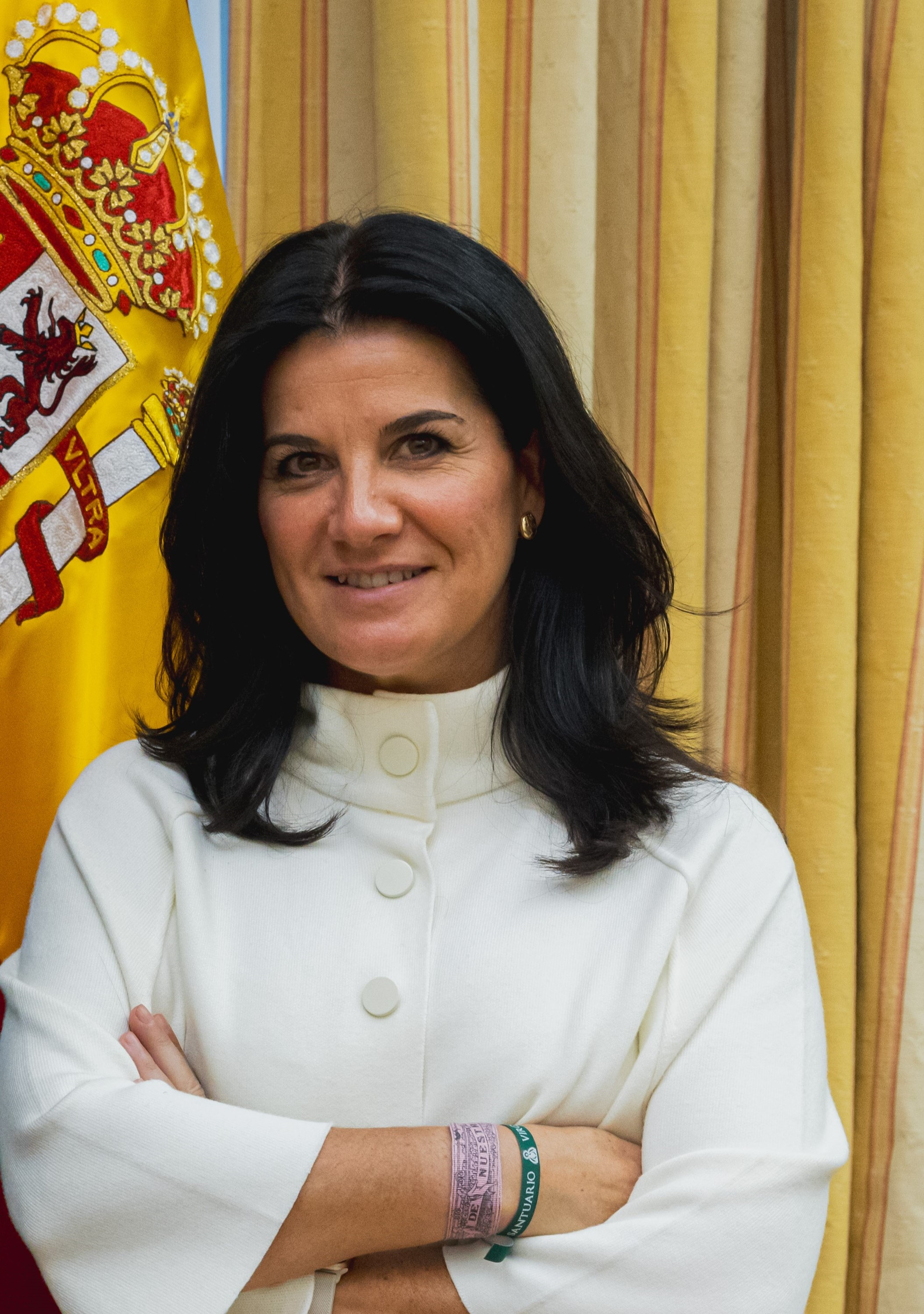
- Ruiz Solas in 2023

Member of the Congress of Deputies
- Incumbent
- Assumed office 17 May 2019

Councilor of the City council of Villaviciosa de Odón
- Incumbent
- Assumed office 24 May 2015

Personal details
- Born: María de la Cabeza Ruiz Solás; 13 September 1970 (age 56) Madrid, Spain
- Party: Vox
- Education: Universidad CEU San Pablo

María de la Cabeza Ruiz Solás (born 9 September 1970 in Madrid) is a Spanish journalist, businesswoman and politician who is a member of the Congress of Deputies for Vox.

== Biography ==
Solás was born in Madrid to a family of Andalusian origin and has three brothers. Her father was an engineer and her mother was a housewife. After leaving school, she studied journalism at the Universidad CEU San Pablo before working for a local newspaper. She later founded a publishing company with her husband focusing on publishing and distributing content in the auto sector and edited a local information magazine in her home municipality of Villaviciosa de Odón.

=== Political career ===
Solás has claimed that she was originally a supporter of the People's Party (PP) but joined Vox in 2015 due to being disappointed with the PP in government. During the 2015 Spanish local elections, she was elected as a councilor for Vox in Villaviciosa de Odón and unsuccessfully stood as Vox's candidate for mayor in the municipality in 2019.

During the April 2019 Spanish general election, she was elected to the Congress of Deputies for Vox representing the Madrid constituency. She was elected again during the November elections of the same year. In Congress, she sits on the Committees for Tourism and Labor, Inclusion, Social Security and Migration.
