= Francisco Polo =

Spanish politician (born 1981)

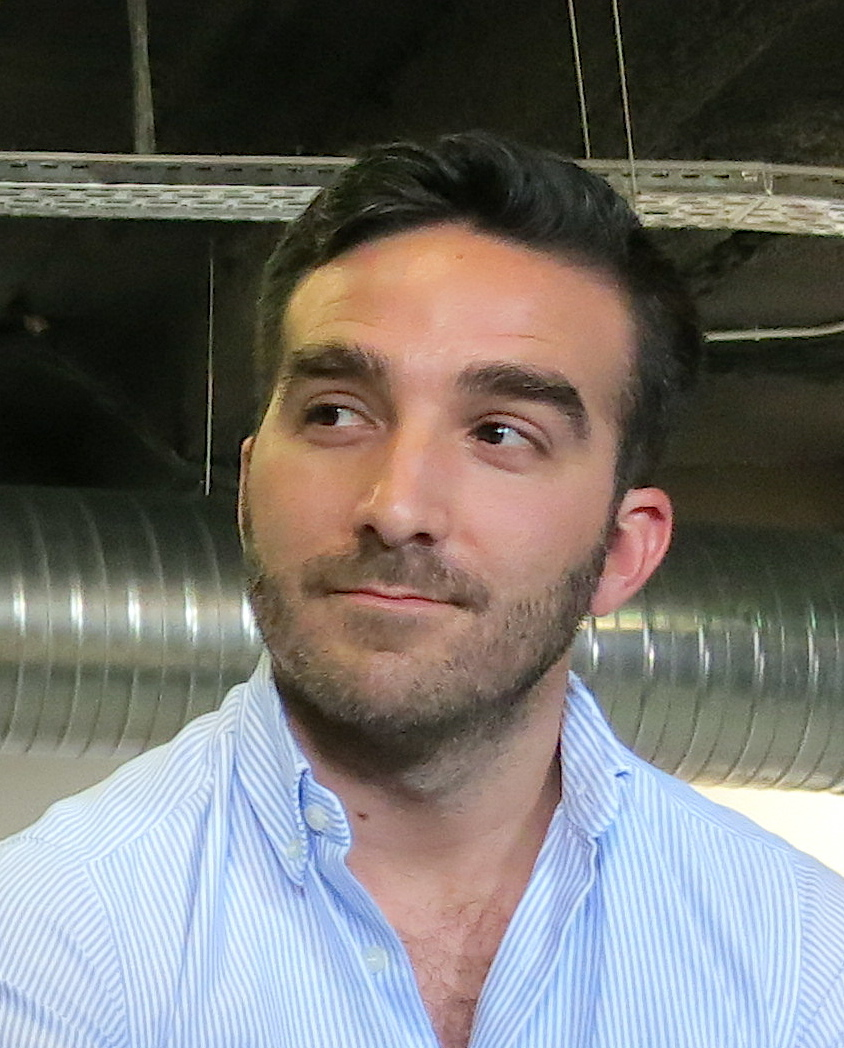
- Polo in 2012

Member of the Congress of Deputies
- In office 21 May 2019 – 27 January 2020
- Succeeded by: Sonia Guerra
- Constituency: Barcelona

Personal details
- Born: 9 April 1981 (age 45)
- Party: Spanish Socialist Workers' Party

Francisco de Paula Polo Llavata (born 9 April 1981) is a Spanish politician. From 2019 to 2020, he was a member of the Congress of Deputies. From 2018 to 2020, he served as secretary of state for telecommunications. From 2020 to 2023, he served as high commissioner for Spain Entrepreneurial Nation.
