= Joaquín Robles López =

Spanish politician (born 1964)

Joaquín Robles López MP
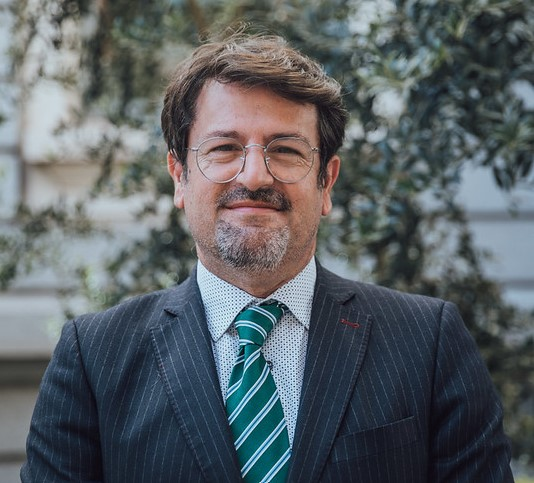

Member of the Congress of Deputies
- Incumbent
- Assumed office April 28, 2019
- Constituency: Murcia

Personal details
- Born: 8 June 1964 (age 62)
- Party: Vox
- Education: University of Murcia

Joaquín Robles López (born June 8, 1964) is a Spanish politician for the Vox party.

== Biography ==
Lopez studied a degree in philosophy at the University of Murcia and then worked as a teacher and teacher at the San Juan de La Cruz Highschool. In the Spanish general election of April 2019 he was elected to the Congress of Deputies for the Murcia constituency, and again during the November 2019 election and 2023 election.
