= Marina Ortega =

Spanish politician (born 1983)

Member of the Parliament of Galicia
- Incumbent
- Assumed office 2020

Member of the Congress of Deputies
- In office 2019–2020

Personal details
- Born: Marina Ortega Otero; 22 January 1983 (age 43)
- Party: Spanish Socialist Workers' Party

Marina Ortega Otero (born 22 January 1983) is a Spanish politician. She was a member of the Congress of Deputies between 2019 and 2020.

She has sat in the Parliament of Galicia since 2020.

== See also ==
- 13th Congress of Deputies
- 14th Congress of Deputies
