= Miguel Ángel Castellón Rubio =

Spanish politician (born 1979)

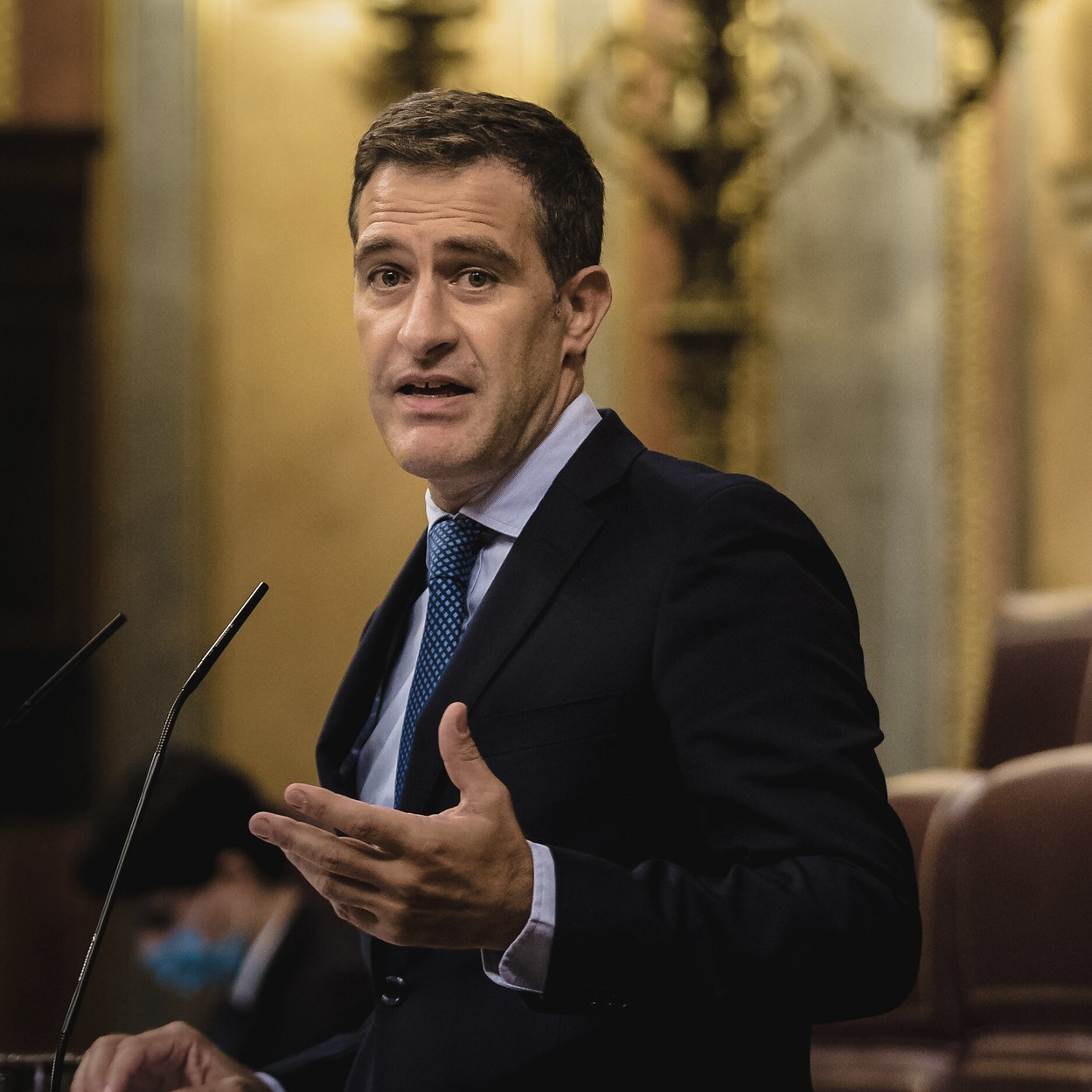
- Castellón in 2020

Member of the Senate
- Incumbent
- Assumed office 23 July 2023
- Constituency: Almería

Member of the Congress of Deputies
- In office 11 November 2019 – 22 July 2023
- Constituency: Almería

Personal details
- Born: 22 January 1979 (age 47)
- Party: People's Party

Miguel Ángel Castellón Rubio (born 22 January 1979) is a Spanish politician serving as a member of the Senate since 2023. From 2019 to 2023, he was a member of the Congress of Deputies.
