= Ángel López Maraver =

Spanish politician (born 1984)

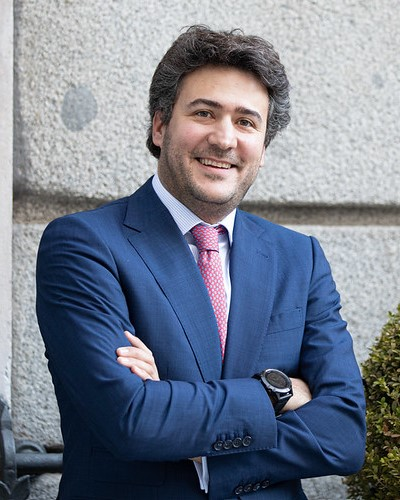
- López Maraver in 2021

Member of the Congress of Deputies
- Incumbent
- Assumed office 3 December 2019
- Constituency: Guadalajara

Personal details
- Born: 18 July 1984 (age 41)
- Party: Vox

Ángel López Maraver (born 18 July 1984) is a Spanish politician serving as a member of the Congress of Deputies since 2019. From 2017 to 2019, he served as president of the Royal Spanish Hunting Federation.
