= Jun, Granada =

Coordinates: 37°13′N 3°36′W

Jun
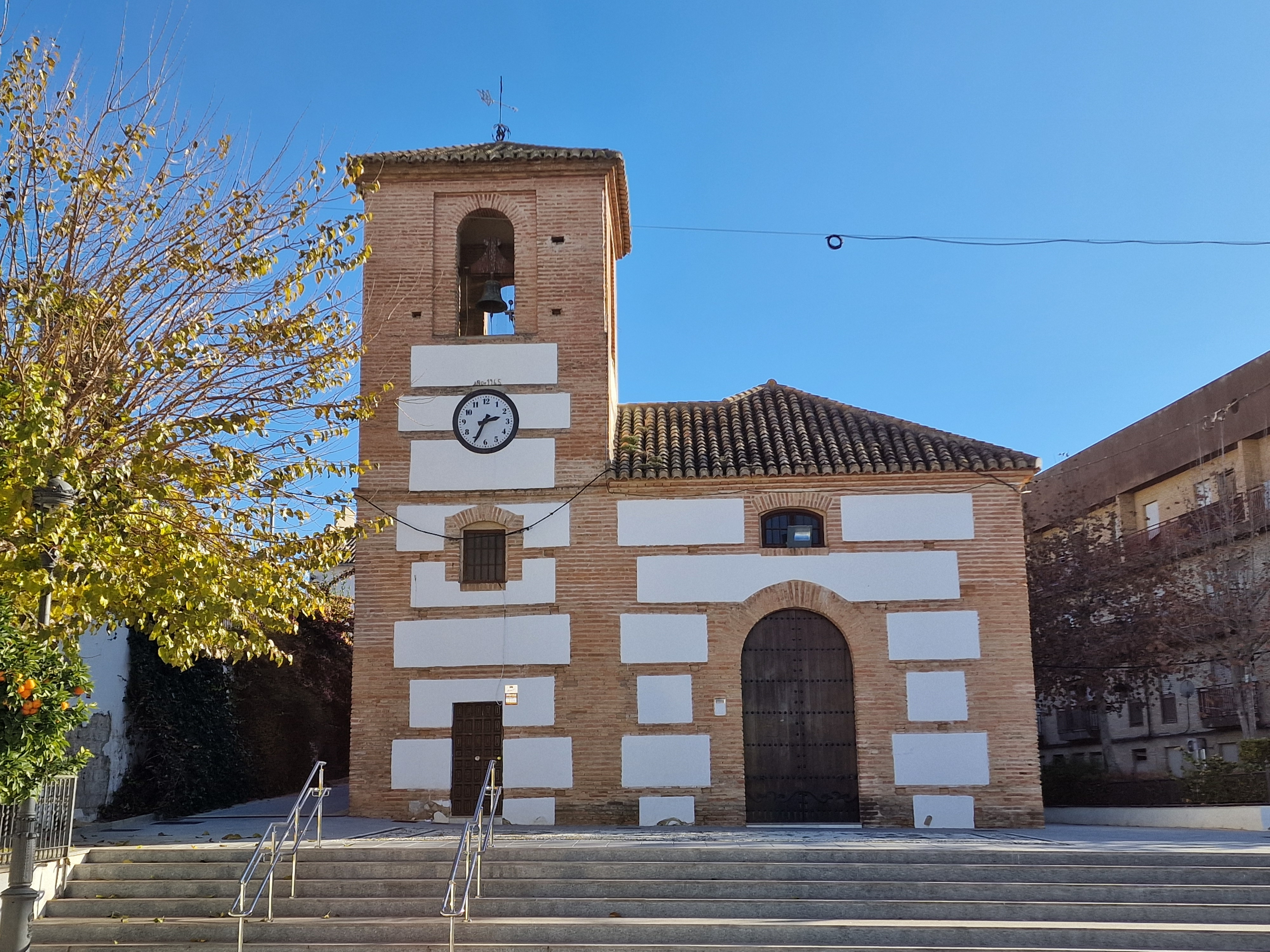

- Flag Coat of arms

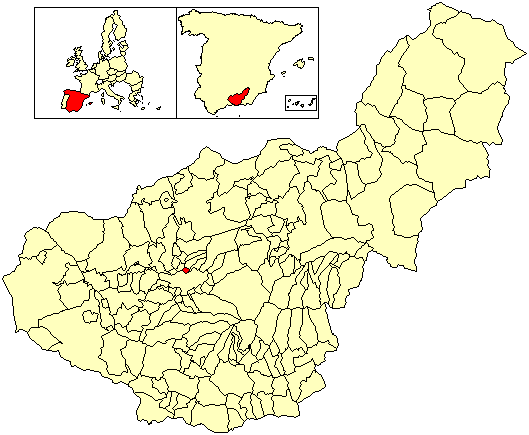

- Location in Spain.
- Country: Spain
- Autonomous community: Andalusia
- Province: Granada

Area
  - Total: 3.69 km^{2} (1.42 sq mi)
- Elevation: 755 m (2,477 ft)

Population (2025-01-01)
  - Total: 4,103
  - Density: 1,110/km^{2} (2,880/sq mi)
- Time zone: UTC+1 (CET)
  - Summer (DST): UTC+2 (CEST)

Jun is a Spanish locality and municipality situated in the north-centre part of la Vega de Granada, in the province of Granada. It limits with the municipalities of Pulianas, Granada, Alfacar and Víznar.

The municipality of Jun is one of the fifty two entities which make up the Metropolitan Area of Granada, and it is formed by Jun and two streets of Pulianas: Alhambra street and Generalife street. It is located in the foothill of the Sierra de la Alfaguara, near river Juncaril.

== Demography ==
According to the National Institute of Statistics os Spain, in the year 2014 there were 3661 inhabitants in Jun.

== Communications ==
El Distribuidor Norte de Granada (VAU-02, also called Ronda Norte) is a big highway which goes through Jun and it communicates highway GR-30 (Circunvalación de Granada) with A-92 (Murcia/Almería-Sevilla).

There is also a local highway, GR-3103, which joins Jun with the centre of Granada —in particular with the suburb of Cartuja, Parque Nueva Granada— and with Alfacar.

== Culture ==
At this present time there is a ceramic industry for construction purposes, but the use of ceramic for artistic purposes is more relevant.

=== Technology ===
Jun is well known for widespread usage of internet technology, both by residents and the municipal government. In December 1999, the municipality announced the right of every citizen to have Internet in their home. In 2001, the town had its first interactive municipal council, leading then-head of the European Commission, Romano Prodi, to call Jun the birthplace of interactive democracy.

Presently, the local government of Jun is working towards future modernization and free software access for Jun residents. The city council is promoting the use of social media for many activities to make the communication between the local government and the citizens easier, with particular emphasis on the use of Twitter.

== Famous Iundenenses ==
Antonio Marín Ocete (1900-1972), rector the University of Granada rector and one attorneys of the Cortes Españolas.

== Twinnings with other cities ==
Barranco, Peru

Issy-les-Moulineaux, France

== See also ==
- List of municipalities in Granada
