= Tomás Fernández Ríos =

Spanish businessman and politician

Tomás Fernández Ríos MP
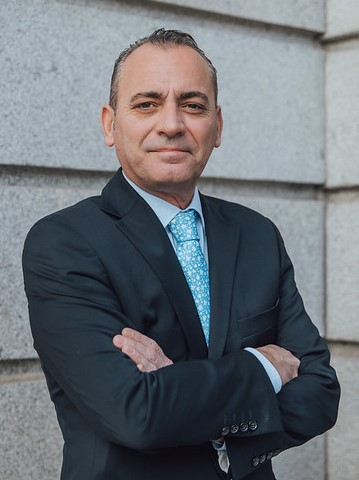

Member of the Congress of Deputies
- Incumbent
- Assumed office 10 November 2019
- Constituency: Huelva

Personal details
- Born: 27 February 1969 (age 57) Madrid, Kingdom of Spain
- Party: Vox (2013-); People's Party (2003-2011)
- Education: Complutense University of Madrid; ESIC University

Tomás Fernández Ríos (born 27 February 1969) is a Spanish businessman and politician who is a member of the Congress of Deputies for Vox.

== Biography ==
Ríos is a native of Madrid. He studied law at the Complutense University of Madrid and a master's in business marketing at ESIC University before working as a company director. He was a member of the People's Party before joining Vox due to disagreeing with the PP's stance on handling matters in the Basque Country.

Ríos ran as a candidate for the Huelva constituency during the May 2019 general election in Spain for Vox, but was unsuccessful at first getting elected. However, he ran again in the November election of the same year and was elected as a deputy in the province.
