= Eduardo Carazo =

Spanish politician (born 1990)

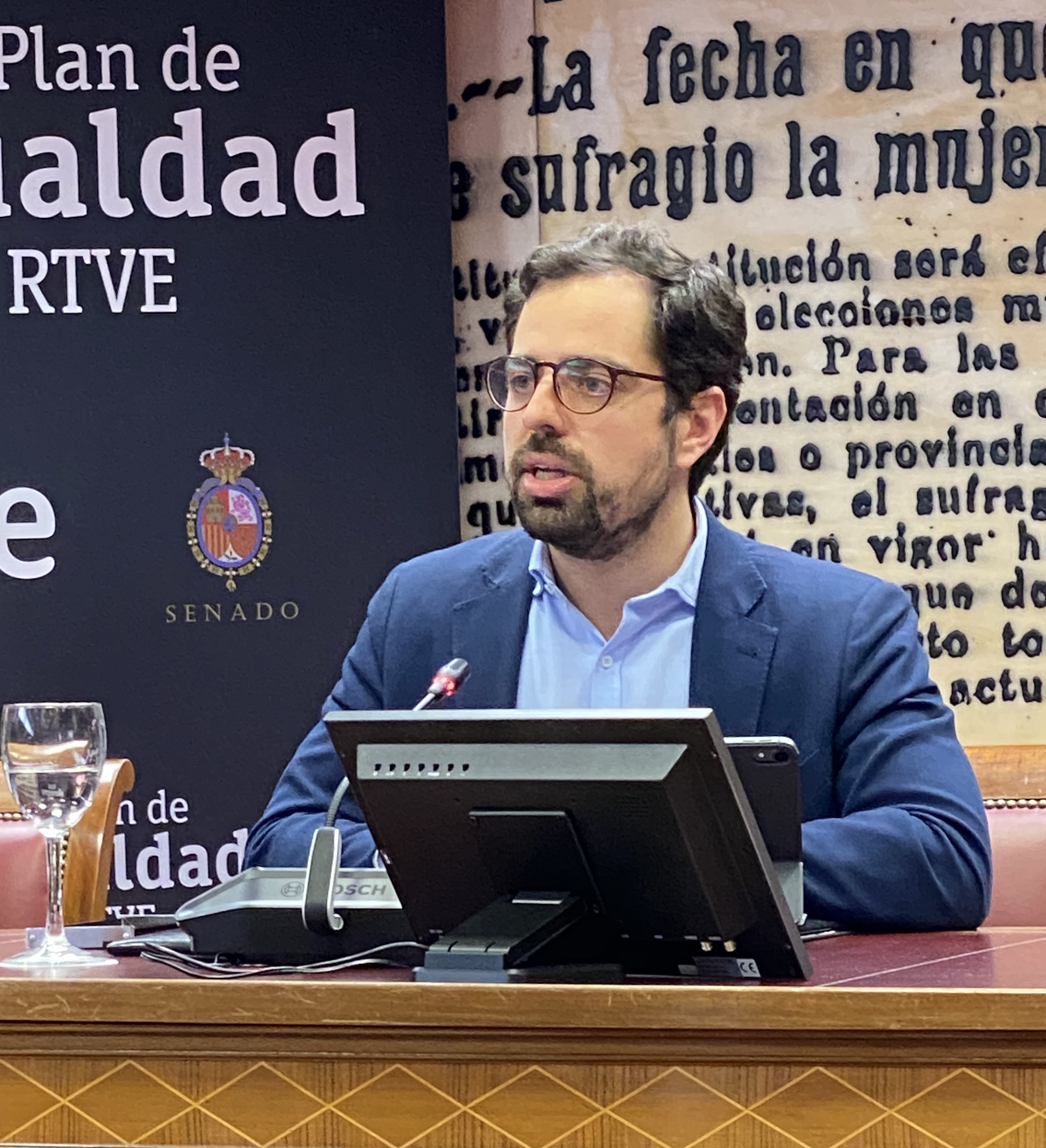
- Carazo in 2022

Member of the Congress of Deputies
- Incumbent
- Assumed office 3 December 2019
- Constituency: Valladolid

Personal details
- Born: 6 January 1990 (age 36)
- Party: People's Party

Eduardo Carazo Hermoso (born 6 January 1990) is a Spanish politician serving as a member of the Congress of Deputies since 2019. From 2015 to 2019, he served as director general of the Institute of Youth of Castile and León.
