= Alberto Rodríguez Almeida =

Spanish politician (born 1978)

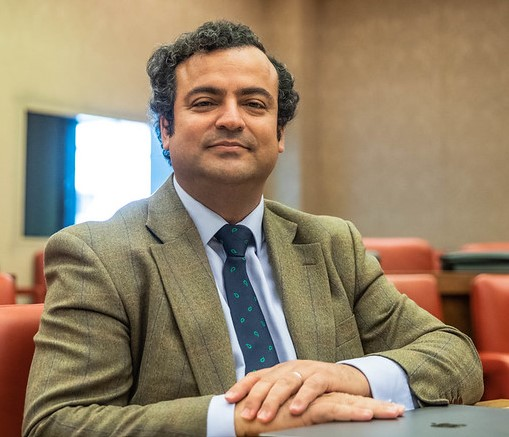
- Rodríguez in 2023

Member of the Congress of Deputies
- Incumbent
- Assumed office 3 December 2019
- Constituency: Las Palmas

Personal details
- Born: 22 February 1978 (age 48)
- Party: Vox

Andrés Alberto Rodríguez Almeida (born 22 February 1978) is a Spanish politician serving as a member of the Congress of Deputies since 2019. In the 2023 local elections, he was the candidate of Vox for mayor of Las Palmas.
