= Julio Utrilla Cano =

Spanish politician

Julio Utrilla Cano MP

Member of the Congress of Deputies
- Incumbent
- Assumed office 10 November 2019
- Constituency: Valencia

Personal details
- Born: 5 March 1967 (age 59) Madrid, Kingdom of Spain
- Party: Vox
- Education: Technical University of Madrid

Julio Utrilla Cano (born March 5, 1967) is a Spanish politician and a member of the Congress of Deputies for the Vox party.

Cano studied at the Technical University of Madrid and is a mining engineer by profession. Cano has also been a national coordinator for Vox. In November 2019, he was elected to the Congress of Deputies representing the Valencia constituency. In the Congress, he sits on the committees for technology and security.
