= Inés Cañizares =

Spanish politician (born 1970)

Inés María Cañizares Pacheco MP
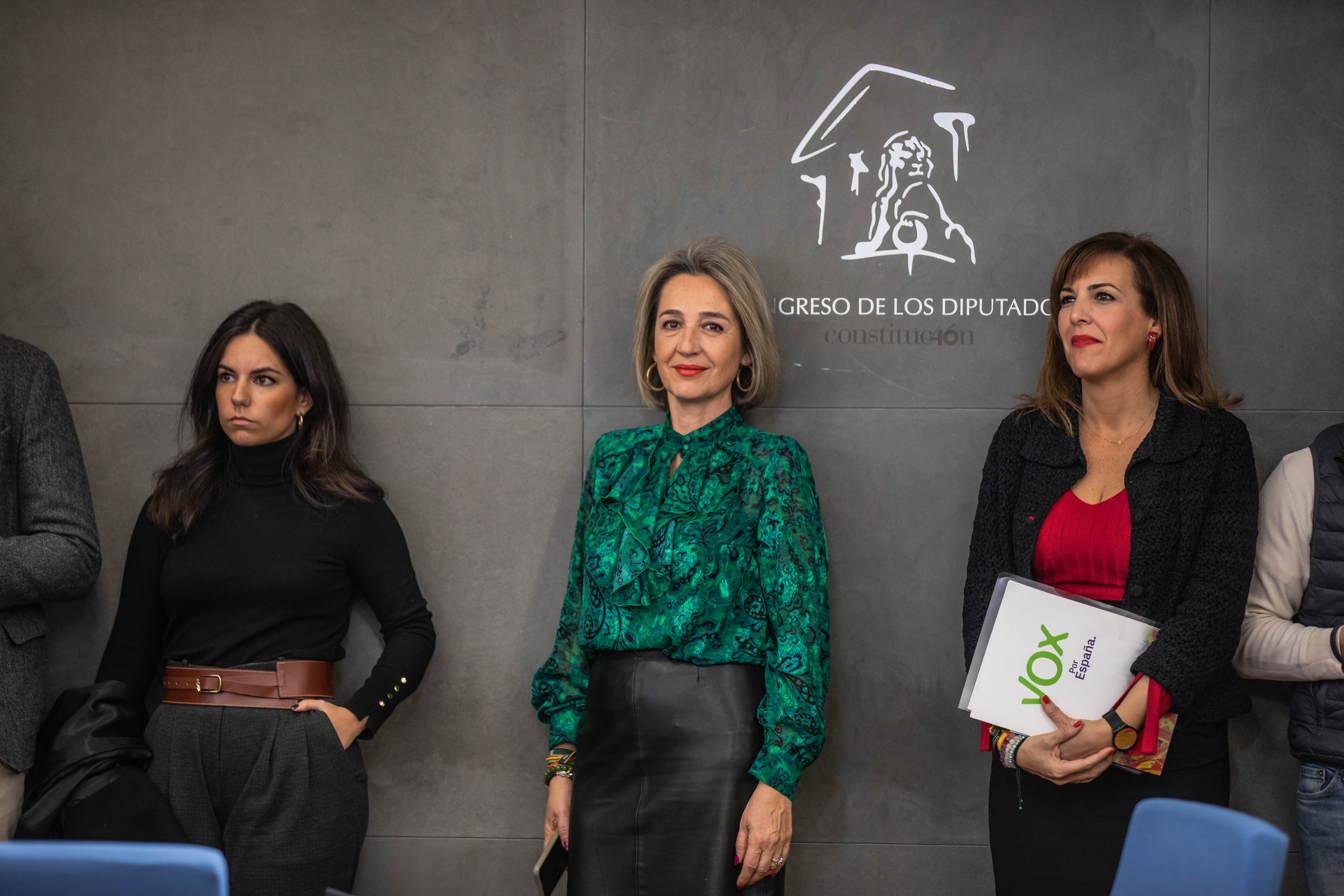

Member of the Congress of Deputies
- Incumbent
- Assumed office 10 November 2019
- Constituency: Toledo

Personal details
- Born: Ines Maria Cañizares Pacheco; 27 September 1970 (age 56) Toledo
- Party: Vox
- Education: University of Castilla–La Mancha; Autonomous University of Madrid

Inés María Cañizares Pacheco (born 27 September 1970) is a Spanish economist and politician for the Vox party. She has been a member of the Congress of Deputies since November 2019 for the Toledo constituency.

Cañizares Pacheco completed a degree in business studies at the University of Castilla–La Mancha in 1993 followed by a Master's in economics at the Autonomous University of Madrid. During the November 2019 Spanish general election, she was placed second on the list for the Toledo constituency for the Congress of Deputies and was subsequently elected. In the Congress, she serves as a member of the Treasury Commission and the Budget Committee.
