= Ana Belén Vázquez =

Spanish politician (born 1975)

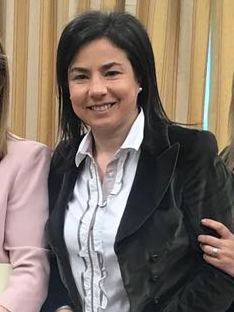
- Vázquez in 2018

Member of the Congress of Deputies
- Incumbent
- Assumed office 5 July 2016
- Constituency: Ourense
- In office 12 March 2000 – 27 October 2015
- Constituency: Ourense

Personal details
- Born: 27 January 1975 (age 51)
- Party: People's Party

Ana Belén Vázquez Blanco (born 27 January 1975) is a Spanish politician. She has been a member of the Congress of Deputies since 2016, having previously served from 2000 to 2015. From 2006 to 2007, she served as mayor of Bande.
