= Rubén Silvano Manso Olivar =

Spanish economist, businessman and politician

Rubén Silvano Manso Olivar MP

Member of the Congress of Deputies
- Incumbent
- Assumed office 10 November 2019
- Constituency: Málaga

Personal details
- Born: 16 December 1966 (age 59)
- Party: Vox
- Education: Complutense University of Madrid

Rubén Silvano Manso Olivar (born 16 December 1966) is a Spanish economist, businessman and politician.

Manso was an inspector for the Bank of Spain and served as the chairman of Banco Madrid before becoming a representative in the Congress of Deputies for the Vox party.

== Biography ==
Manso graduated with a doctorate in economics from the Complutense University of Madrid and worked as a financial regulator and then the CEO of several asset managing companies, including Banco Zaragozano and Eurobank del Mediterráneo. In 2015, he was appointed chairman of Banco Madrid.

He has also lectured in economics and business science at the University of Alcalá.

Manso took leave of absence from his roles at Banco Madrid and the Bank of Spain in order to become the coordinator of Vox's economic program.

== Political career ==
Manso was elected to the Congress of Deputies during the November 2019 Spanish general election to represent the Málaga constituency for Vox.

He is Vox's media spokesman for economic issues. He argues in favor of greater deregulation of financial markets, the abolition of autonomous communities and the minimum wage, as well as the reduction of social security contributions.
