= Francisco Jose Contreras =

Spanish politician

Francisco Jose Contreras MP
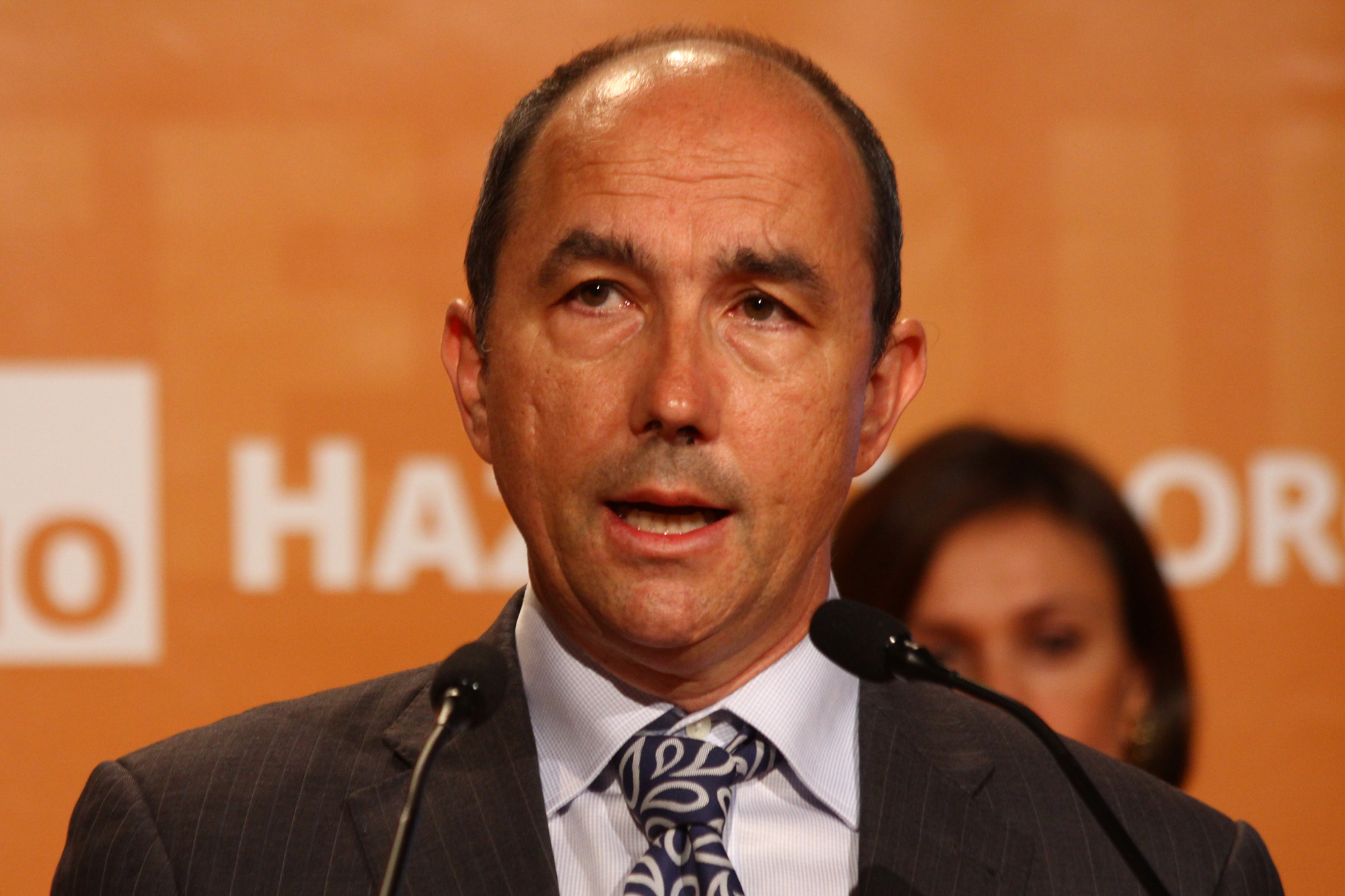

Member of the Congress of Deputies
- Incumbent
- Assumed office 17 May 2019

Personal details
- Born: Francisco José Contreras Peláez; 17 February 1964 (age 62) Seville, Spain
- Party: Vox
- Education: University of Seville

Francisco Jose Contreras (born 17 February 1964) is a Spanish jurist, professor and politician who has been a member of the Congress of Deputies for the Vox party since the April 2019 elections.

== Biography ==
Contreras holds a degree in law from the University of Seville where he has also taught law and political theory since 2007. His academic work has focused on the writing of Immanuel Kant.

He is also the co-author of the book Historical Memory; a threat to peace in Europe which was published by the European Conservatives and Reformists group in the European Parliament. The book contains contributions from Hermann Tertsch and Stanley G. Payne among others.

== Political career ==
Contreras is the leader of the executive committee for the Vox party in Seville. During the Spanish general election of 2019, he was elected to the Congress of Deputies.
