= List of LGBTQ politicians in Spain =

This is a list of lesbian, gay, and bisexual, and transgender (LGBT) Spaniards who have served in the Spanish Cortes Generales, the Spanish government or the regional parliaments.

As of May 2026, 40 members of the LGBT community are known to have held office in the Spanish Cortes Generales. In the Congress, 30 LGBT people held office; in the Senate, 16 held office. Six people, Jerónimo Saavedra, Miriam Blasco, Antonio Hurtado, María Freixanet, Javier Maroto, Raúl Díaz and Jaime de los Santos have served in both Chambers. The earliest known LGBT congressperson was Jerónimo Saavedra, who is also the earliest known openly LGBT senator, although he was not out during his tenure as deputy. The earliest openly LGBT deputy is therefore Ernesto Gasco. Following the 2023 elections, Carla Antonelli became the first trans person to serve in either chamber of the Spanish legislature. As of 3 October 2025, there are 8 openly LGBT members of the 15th Congress: 6 of them belong to the Spanish Socialist Workers' Party or the Socialists' Party of Catalonia and two belong to the People's Party; and three openly LGBT senators, one from the People's Party, one from the Spanish Socialist Workers' Party and one from the regionalist Más Madrid.

== Senate ==
All senators listed served as open members of the LGBT community unless otherwise specified:

† Came out after serving

‡ Posthumously identified as LGBT

Senator	Party	Elected by	Term		Notes
Senator	Party	Elected by	Start	End	Notes
Jerónimo Saavedra	Spanish Socialist Workers' Party	Regional designation (Canary Islands)	July 20, 1999	July 22, 2003	Saavedra became the first openly LGBT senator and the first openly LGBT politician of Spain after the Franco dictatorship.
Miriam Blasco†	People's Party	Elected (Valencia)	March 12, 2000	September 26, 2011	Blasco came out in 2017, when she announced she was married since 2015 to her former rival from the 1992 Olympics, Nicola Fairbrother, after 22 years of relationship. She was previously married to a man, Alfredo Aracil. During her tenure, she voted against the same-sex marriage bill.
Antonio Hurtado	Spanish Socialist Workers' Party	Elected (Córdoba)	March 9, 2008	September 26, 2011	Hurtado is openly gay.
Jesús Martín	Spanish Socialist Workers' Party	Elected (Ciudad Real)	November 20, 2011	Incumbent	Martín is openly gay.
Pilar Lima	Podemos	Regional designation (Valencia)	July 22, 2015	May 15, 2019	Lima became the first openly lesbian senator.
María Freixanet	Catalonia in Common	Elected (Barcelona)	December 20, 2015	May 21, 2019	Freixanet is openly lesbian.
Iñaki Oyarzabal	People's Party	Elected (Álava)	June 26, 2016	March 5, 2019	Oyarzábal recognised his homosexuality in June 2012, after agreeing to appear in the list of most influential gay Spaniards.
Hipólito Suárez	People's Party	Elected (Gran Canaria)	June 26, 2016	March 4, 2019	Suárez is openly gay.
Eduardo Rubiño	Más Madrid	Regional designation (Madrid)	July 11, 2019	July 12, 2021	Rubiño is openly gay.
Raúl Díaz	Spanish Socialist Workers' Party	Regional designation (La Rioja)	July 23, 2019	January 10, 2022	Díaz is openly gay.
Javier Maroto	People's Party	Regional designation (Castile and León)	July 24, 2019	Incumbent	
Pablo Ruz	People's Party	Elected (Alicante)	November 11, 2019	May 29, 2023	Ruz is openly gay
Koldo Martínez	Geroa Bai	Regional designation (Navarre)	November 11, 2019	August 17, 2023	Martínez is openly gay.
Jaime de los Santos	People's Party	Regional designation (Madrid)	July 9, 2021	May 29, 2023	
Carla Antonelli	Más Madrid	Regional designation (Madrid)	August 17, 2023	Incumbent	Antonelli became the first trans person to serve in the Spanish Cortes Generales

== Congress of Deputies ==
All deputies listed served as open members of the LGBT community unless otherwise specified:

† Came out after serving

‡ Posthumously identified as LGBT

Representative	Party	Province	Term		Notes
Representative	Party	Province	Start	End	Notes
Jerónimo Saavedra†	Spanish Socialist Workers' Party	Las Palmas	June 15, 1977	May 26, 1983	Saavedra came out later in the 2000, during his tenure as Senator.
Jerónimo Saavedra†	Spanish Socialist Workers' Party	Las Palmas	March 3, 1996	July 6, 1999	Saavedra came out later in the 2000, during his tenure as Senator.
Miquel Iceta†	Socialists' Party of Catalonia	Barcelona	March 27, 1996	November 5, 1999	Iceta came out on November 13, 1999.
Ernesto Gasco	Spanish Socialist Workers' Party	Gipuzkoa	April 1, 2008	May 14, 2009	Gasco was the first Spanish deputy to openly serve. His domestic partnership with his boyfriend in 2003 became the first one of that kind. In 2005, after the approval of the same-sex marriage bill, they became the first same-sex marriage of two politicians in Spain. When he was elected in 2008, he became the first married gay deputy.
Ángeles Álvarez	Spanish Socialist Workers' Party	Madrid	December 13, 2011	October 27, 2015	Álvarez married her girlfriend on October 28, 2005, the first female same-sex marriage officiated at the Madrid City Council following the approval of the same-sex marriage bill.
Ángeles Álvarez	Spanish Socialist Workers' Party	Madrid	July 19, 2016	March 3, 2019	Álvarez married her girlfriend on October 28, 2005, the first female same-sex marriage officiated at the Madrid City Council following the approval of the same-sex marriage bill.
Antonio Hurtado	Spanish Socialist Workers' Party	Córdoba	December 13, 2011	March 5, 2019	
Antonio Hurtado	Spanish Socialist Workers' Party	Córdoba	February 25, 2020	May 30, 2023	
Felipe Sicilia	Spanish Socialist Workers' Party	Jaén	December 13, 2011	May 30, 2023	Sicilia is openly gay.
Miriam Blasco†	People's Party	Alicante	December 13, 2011	October 27, 2015	
Ricardo Sixto	United Left	Valencia	December 13, 2011	May 20, 2019	Sixto is openly gay.
José Manuel Girela	Spanish Socialist Workers' Party	Seville	July 8, 2014	October 27, 2015	Girela is openly gay.
Adrián Barbón	Spanish Socialist Workers' Party	Asturias	September 29, 2015	October 27, 2015	
Lucía Martín	In Common We Can	Barcelona	December 20, 2015	April 21, 2019	Martín is openly LGBT.
María Such	Spanish Socialist Workers' Party	Valencia	January 5, 2016	August 8, 2016	Such married her girlfriend in 2020.
María del Mar García	Podemos	Barcelona	January 13, 2016	May 30, 2023	García is openly bisexual.
Ángela Rodríguez	Podemos	Pontevedra	January 13, 2016	May 21, 2019	Rodríguez "Pam" is openly bisexual.
Sergi Miquel	Catalan European Democratic Party	Girona	July 5, 2016	May 30, 2023	Miquel is openly gay.
Joan Mena	Catalonia in Common	Barcelona	July 13, 2016	May 30, 2023	Mena is openly gay.
Javier Maroto	People's Party	Álava	October 18, 2016	March 5, 2019	Maroto announced his marriage with his 19-year partner in June 2015. Representatives from the conservative People's Party assisted to the wedding, sparkling criticism after their known opposition to the same-sex marriage law.
Arnau Ramírez	Socialists' Party of Catalonia	Barcelona	May 21, 2019	Incumbent	Ramírez is openly gay.
María Freixanet	Catalonia in Common	Barcelona	May 21, 2019	September 24, 2019	Freixanet is openly lesbian.
Sergio Sayas	Navarra Suma (until March 1, 2022)	Navarre	May 21, 2019	May 30, 2023	Sayas is openly gay.
Sergio Sayas	Independent (March 1, 2022 - August 17, 2023)	Navarre	May 21, 2019	May 30, 2023	Sayas is openly gay.
Sergio Sayas	People's Party	Navarre	August 17, 2023	Incumbent	Sayas is openly gay.
Fernando Grande-Marlaska	Spanish Socialist Workers' Party	Cádiz	May 21, 2019	February 21, 2020	Grande-Marlaska is openly gay, and married his boyfriend in 2005 following the approval of the same-sex marriage law.
Fernando Grande-Marlaska	Spanish Socialist Workers' Party	Cádiz	August 17, 2023	December 6, 2023	Grande-Marlaska is openly gay, and married his boyfriend in 2005 following the approval of the same-sex marriage law.
Francisco Polo	Socialists' Party of Catalonia	Barcelona	May 21, 2019	January 27, 2020	Polo is openly gay.
Pablo Montesinos	People's Party	Málaga	May 21, 2019	April 21, 2022	Montesinos is openly LGBT
Antidio Fagúndez	Spanish Socialist Workers' Party	Zamora	December 3, 2019	Incumbent	Fagúndez is openly gay.
Pedro Casares	Spanish Socialist Workers' Party	Cantabria	December 3, 2019	Jul 29, 2025	Casares is openly gay.
Raquel Pedraja	Spanish Socialist Workers' Party	La Rioja	February 18, 2020	May 30, 2023	Pedraja is openly lesbian.
Lázaro Azorín	Spanish Socialist Workers' Party	Alicante	February 25, 2020	Incumbent	Azorín is openly gay.
Raúl Díaz	Spanish Socialist Workers' Party	La Rioja	August 17, 2023	Incumbent	Díaz is openly gay.
Jaime de los Santos	People's Party	Madrid	August 17, 2023	Incumbent	
Víctor Gutiérrez	Spanish Socialist Workers' Party	Madrid	December 5, 2023	Incumbent	Gutiérrez is openly gay since 2016, when he became the first openly gay elite Spanish sportsman.
Gabriel Arrúe	Spanish Socialist Workers' Party	Biscay	June 10, 2025	Incumbent	Arrúe is openly LGBT.

== Government ==
In addition, several members of the Spanish government, present in the Spanish Cortes Generales but without right to vote, have belonged to the LGBT community.

All ministers listed served as open members of the LGBT community unless otherwise specified:

† Came out after serving

‡ Posthumously identified as LGBT

Minister	Party	Ministry	Term		Notes
Minister	Party	Ministry	Start	End	Notes
Jerónimo Saavedra†	Spanish Socialist Workers' Party	Minister of Public Administrations	July 14, 1993	July 3, 1995	
Jerónimo Saavedra†	Spanish Socialist Workers' Party	Minister of Education and Science	July 3, 1995	May 5, 1996	
Miguel Sebastián†	Spanish Socialist Workers' Party	Minister of Industry, Tourism and Trade	April 14, 2008	December 22, 2011	
Màxim Huerta	Independent	Minister of Culture and Sport	June 7, 2018	June 14, 2018	Huerta is openly gay.
Fernando Grande-Marlaska	Spanish Socialist Workers' Party	Minister of the Interior	June 7, 2018	Incumbent	
Miquel Iceta	Socialists' Party of Catalonia	Minister of Territorial Policy and Civil Service	January 27, 2021	July 12, 2021	
Miquel Iceta	Socialists' Party of Catalonia	Minister of Culture and Sport	July 12, 2021	November 21, 2023	

== Andalusian Parliament ==
Deputy	Party	Term		Notes
Deputy	Party	Start	End	Notes
Felipe Sicilia	Spanish Socialist Workers' Party	October 10, 2007	April 1, 2008	
Felipe Sicilia	Spanish Socialist Workers' Party	September 25, 2009	December 1, 2011	
Antonio Maíllo	United Left	April 16, 2015	June 18, 2019	Maíllo is openly gay.

== Basque Parliament ==
Deputy	Party	Term		Notes
Deputy	Party	Start	End	Notes
Iñaki Oyarzabal	People's Party	May 31, 1996	June 26, 2016	Oyarzabal came out in 2012.
Javier Maroto†	People's Party	November 20, 2012	June 30, 2015	
Eukene Arana	Elkarrekin Podemos	October 21, 2016	February 11, 2020	Arana is openly lesbian and mother of twins.
Ikoitz Arrese	EH Bildu	August 3, 2020	Incumbent	Arrese is openly LGBT

== Canarian Parliament ==
Senator	Party	Term		Notes
Senator	Party	Start	End	Notes
Jerónimo Saavedra†	Spanish Socialist Workers' Party	May 8, 1983	July 14, 1993	
Jerónimo Saavedra†	Spanish Socialist Workers' Party	June 13, 1999	May 25, 2003	
Noelia García†	People's Party	April 12, 2000	May 25, 2003	
Hipólito Suárez	People's Party	June 25, 2019	Incumbent	
Omar López González	Spanish Socialist Workers' Party	June 25, 2019	October 7, 2019	

== Extremaduran Assembly ==
Deputy	Party	Term		Notes
Deputy	Party	Start	End	Notes
Víctor Manuel Casco	United Left	July 21, 2011	March 30, 2015	Casco came out while defending a proposal related to the defense of the Human Rights of LGBT people.

== General Junta of the Principality of Asturias ==
Deputy	Party	Term		Notes
Deputy	Party	Start	End	Notes
Adrián Barbón	Spanish Socialist Workers' Party	June 24, 2019	Incumbent	

== Madrid Assembly ==
Deputy	Party	Term		Notes
Deputy	Party	Start	End	Notes
Carla Antonelli	Spanish Socialist Workers' Party	June 7, 2011	June 8, 2021	When elected, Antonelli became the first trans person appointed to a legislature in Spain, and was reelected in 2015 and 2019. She failed to retain her seat following the 2021 regional election. She is the first and to date only trans person to serve in any regional or national legislature in Spain.
Carla Antonelli	Más Madrid	June 14, 2023	Incumbent	
Eduardo Rubiño	Más Madrid	June 9, 2015	June 12, 2023	
Beatriz Gimeno	Podemos	June 9, 2015	June 13, 2023	Historical activist, she is openly lesbian. She was married from 2005 to 2012.
Jaime de los Santos	People's Party	June 11, 2019	Incumbent	De los Santos is openly gay.
Purificación Causapié	Spanish Socialist Workers' Party	June 11, 2019	June 13, 2023	Causapié is openly lesbian.
Paloma García Villa	Unidas Podemos	February 6, 2020	June 13, 2023	García Villa is openly LGBT.
Santiago Rivero	Spanish Socialist Workers' Party	June 8, 2021	Incumbent	Rivero is openly gay.
Jimena González	Más Madrid	June 14, 2023	Incumbent	González is a trans activist
Guillermo Martín	Spanish Socialist Workers' Party	June 14, 2023	Incumbent	Martín is openly LGBT

== Parliament of Catalonia ==
Senator	Party	Term		Notes
Senator	Party	Start	End	Notes
Miquel Iceta	Socialists' Party of Catalonia	November 5, 1999	January 26, 2021	
Antoni Comín	Socialists' Party of Catalonia	June 28, 2004	October 5, 2010	Comín came out in 2006.
Antoni Comín	Together for Catalonia	October 26, 2015	July 30, 2018	Comín came out in 2006.
Santiago Vila	Democratic Convergence of Catalonia	November 10, 2006	February 12, 2013	Vila is openly gay.
Jaume Collboni	Socialists' Party of Catalonia	December 16, 2010	March 14, 2014	Collboni is openly gay and was married until 2016.

== Parliament of Galicia ==
Deputy	Party	Term		Notes
Deputy	Party	Start	End	Notes
Iria Carreira	Galician Nationalist Bloc	August 11, 2020	Incumbent	

== Parliament of La Rioja ==
Deputy	Party	Term		Notes
Deputy	Party	Start	End	Notes
Raúl Díaz	Spanish Socialist Workers' Party	July 1, 2015	Incumbent	

== Parliament of Navarre ==
Deputy	Party	Term		Notes
Deputy	Party	Start	End	Notes
Sergio Sayas	Navarrese People's Union	June 18, 2007	May 13, 2019	
Koldo Martínez	Geroa Bai	June 17, 2015	December 3, 2019	Martínez came out during his tenure.
Kevin Lucero	Socialist Party of Navarre	June 16, 2023	Incumbent	Lucero is openly gay

== Parliament of the Balearic Islands ==
Deputy	Party	Term		Notes
Deputy	Party	Start	End	Notes
Nel Martí	More for Menorca	June 1, 2011	May 2, 2019	Martí is openly gay.
Miquel Ensenyat	More for Mallorca	June 21, 2019	Incumbent	Ensenyat is openly gay.

== Regional Assembly of Murcia ==
Deputy	Party	Term		Notes
Deputy	Party	Start	End	Notes
Rosa Peñalver	Spanish Socialist Workers' Party	2003	2008	Peñalver is openly lesbian and married.
Rosa Peñalver	Spanish Socialist Workers' Party	July 1, 2015	Incumbent	Peñalver is openly lesbian and married.
Antonio José Espín	Spanish Socialist Workers' Party	May 16, 2019	Incumbent	Espín is openly gay.
Miguel Ángel Ortega	Spanish Socialist Workers' Party	September 14, 2023	Incumbent	Ortega is openly gay

== Valencian Corts ==
Deputy	Party	Term		Notes
Deputy	Party	Start	End	Notes
Francesc Ferri	Compromís	July 1, 2015	January 17, 2022	Ferri is openly gay.
Jesús Salmerón	Citizens (until May 7, 2021)	May 16, 2019	May 29, 2023	Salmerón is openly gay.
Jesús Salmerón	Independent (since May 7, 2021)	May 16, 2019	May 29, 2023	Salmerón is openly gay.
Pilar Lima	Podemos	May 16, 2019	June 26, 2023	
Gerard Fullana	Compromís	September 14, 2023	Incumbent	Fullana is openly gay.
Francesc Roig	Compromís	September 14, 2023	Incumbent	Roig is openly gay.

== Mayors ==
Mayor	Party	City	Pop. (2018)	Region	Term		Notes
Mayor	Party	City	Pop. (2018)	Region	Start	End	Notes
Francisco Maroto	Spanish Socialist Workers' Party	Campillo de Ranas	147	Castile-La Mancha	June 23, 2003	Incumbent	
Jesús Martín	Spanish Socialist Workers' Party	Valdepeñas	30,210	Castile-La Mancha	June 23, 2003	Incumbent	
Julián Aguilar	Spanish Socialist Workers' Party	Salinas de Pisuerga	319	Castile-La Mancha	June 23, 2003	Incumbent	Aguilar is openly LGBT
Miquel Ensenyat	More for Mallorca	Esporles	5,020	Balearic Islands	June 4, 2005	June 13, 2015	Ensenyat is openly gay.
Jerónimo Saavedra	Spanish Socialist Workers' Party	Las Palmas	378,517	Canary Islands	June 16, 2007	June 11, 2011	
Teodoro Sosa	Rural Nationalist Bloc-New Canaries	Gáldar	24,209	Canary Islands	July 6, 2007	Incumbent	He recognized his homosexuality in 2010.
Adrián Barbón	Spanish Socialist Workers' Party	Laviana	13,087	Asturias	September 30, 2008	October 9, 2017	
David Font	Catalan European Democratic Party	Gironella	4,916	Catalonia	June 11, 2011	Incumbent	Font is openly gay
Javier Maroto†	People's Party	Vitoria	249,176	Basque Country	June 11, 2011	June 13, 2015	
Francisco Javier Pérez Diego	Spanish Socialist Workers' Party	Clavijo	273	La Rioja	June 11, 2011	June 13, 2015	Pérez Diego is openly gay.
Lázaro Azorín	Spanish Socialist Workers' Party	Pinoso	8,142	Valencian Community	June 11, 2011	Incumbent	
Hipólito Suárez	People's Party	Moya	7,728	Canary Islands	June 11, 2011	June 15, 2019	
Ada Colau	Barcelona in Common	Barcelona	1,620,343	Catalonia	June 13, 2015	June 17, 2023	Colau came out as bisexual in 2017.
Jaume Collboni	Socialists' Party of Catalonia	Barcelona	1,620,343	Catalonia	June 17, 2023	Incumbent	
Vicent Muñoz	Compromís	Font de la Figuera	2,038	Valencian Community	June 13, 2015	June 17, 2023	Muñoz is openly gay.
Rafael Martínez	Spanish Socialist Workers' Party	San Martín de la Vega	18,784	Community of Madrid	June 13, 2015	Incumbent	Martínez is openly gay.
Óscar Antúnez	Spanish Socialist Workers' Party	Hoyos	906	Extremadura	June 13, 2015	Incumbent	Antúnez is openly gay.
Luis Viejo	Spanish Socialist Workers' Party	Brihuega	2,399	Castile-La Mancha	June 13, 2015	Incumbent	Viejo is openly gay.
Javier Silva	Socialists' Party of Catalonia	Polinyá	8,389	Catalonia	June 13, 2015	Incumbent	Silva is openly gay.
Rubén García	Spanish Socialist Workers' Party	Torrecaballeros	1,323	Castile and León	June 13, 2015	Incumbent	García is openly gay.
Koldo Goitia	Basque Nationalist Party	Lekeitio	7,258	Basque Country	June 13, 2015	June 17, 2023	Goitia is openly gay
Noelia García	People's Party	Los Llanos de Aridane	20,648	Canary Islands	June 13, 2015	June 17, 2023	García is openly LGBT
Samuel Falomir	Spanish Socialist Workers' Party	L'Alcora	10,430	Valencian Community	June 10, 2017	Incumbent	Falomir is openly gay.
Jordi Ballart	Tot per Terrassa	Terrassa	218,535	Catalonia	June 15, 2017	Incumbent	Ballart is openly gay and married.
Darío Moreno	Spanish Socialist Workers' Party	Sagunto	65,669	Valencian Community	June 15, 2019	Incumbent	Moreno is openly gay.
José Veira	People's Party	Los Molares	3,460	Andalusia	June 15, 2019	Incumbent	Veira is openly gay.
Diego Ortiz-González	Spanish Socialist Workers' Party	Pinto	51,541	Community of Madrid	June 15, 2019	June 17, 2023	Ortiz-González is openly gay and married.
Óscar Relaño	Spanish Socialist Workers' Party	Mandayona	297	Castile-La Mancha	June 15, 2019	Incumbent	Relaño is openly gay.
Aritz Abaroa	Basque Nationalist Party	Bermeo	16,688	Basque Country	June 15, 2019	June 17, 2023	
Cristian Delgado	Spanish Socialist Workers' Party	Barruelo de Santullán	1,183	Castile and León	June 15, 2019	Incumbent	Delgado is openly gay.
Luis María Egurrola	Basque Nationalist Party	Markina-Xemein	4,934	Basque Country	June 15, 2019	June 17, 2023	
Samuel Martín	Spanish Socialist Workers' Party	Pasarón de la Vera	641	Extremadura	June 15, 2019	Incumbent	
Víctor Morugij	Spanish Socialist Workers' Party	El Barco de Ávila	2,298	Castile and León	June 15, 2019	June 17, 2023	Morugij is openly gay.
Alberto Merchante	Spanish Socialist Workers' Party	Albalate de Zorita	1,080	Castile-La Mancha	December 7, 2016	June 17, 2023	Merchante is openly gay
Virginia Hernández	Valladolid Toma la Palabra	San Pelayo	48	Castile and León	June 15, 2019	June 17, 2023	Hernández is openly LGBT
Carlos Valle	Spanish Socialist Workers' Party	Cudillero	5,078	Asturias	June 15, 2019	Incumbent	Valle is openly LGBT
Alfonso Caja	Spanish Socialist Workers' Party	La Estrella	205	Castile-La Mancha	June 15, 2019	Incumbent	Caja is openly gay
Sergio Parra	Citizens	Valdemoro	77,587	Community of Madrid	June 15, 2019	June 17, 2023	Parra is openly LGBT
Marco Antonio González	Spanish Socialist Workers' Party	Puerto de la Cruz	30,179	Canary Islands	June 15, 2019	Incumbent	González is openly LGBT
Rubén Gómez Buil	Spanish Socialist Workers' Party	Santorcaz	822	Community of Madrid	June 15, 2019	June 17, 2023	Gómez is openly LGBT
Adrián Álvarez	United Left	Fuenterrobles	682	Valencian Community	June 15, 2019	Incumbent	Álvarez is openly gay
Antonio Muñoz	Spanish Socialist Workers' Party	Seville	688,711	Andalusia	January 3, 2022	June 17, 2023	Muñoz is openly gay.
Jesús Salmerón	People’s Party	Gátova	412	Valencian Community	June 17, 2023	Incumbent	
Antonio Moreno	People’s Party	Carcelén	483	Castile-La Mancha	June 17, 2023	Incumbent	Moreno is openly gay and former sex actor
Pablo Ruz	People’s Party	Elche	234,765	Valencian Community	June 17, 2023	Incumbent	Ruz is openly gay
Rubén García de Andrés	Spanish Socialist Workers' Party	Torrecaballeros	1,496	Castile and León	June 17, 2023	Incumbent	García de Andrés is openly gay

== See also ==
- LGBT rights in Spain
