= Albalate =

Albalate is the name of several towns in Spain:

- Albalate del Arzobispo, in the province of Teruel, Aragón
- Albalate de Cinca, in the province of Huesca, Aragón
- Albalate de las Nogueras, in the province of Cuenca, Castile-La Mancha
- Albalate de Zorita, in the province of Guadalajara, Castile-La Mancha
