= Nataša Pavlović Bujas =

- Наташа Павловић Бујас
- Nataša in 2024
- Born: 9 September 1968; Valjevo, PR Serbia, FPR Yugoslavia
- Education: The Faculty of Chemistry, University of Belgrade
- Occupation: Businessman
- Years active: 1994—

Nataša Pavlović Bujas (Serbian Cyrillic: Наташа Павловић Бујас; Born in Valjevo on September 9, 1969) is a Serbian communications professional and entrepreneur. She founded Blumen Group, a Belgrade-based agency for integrated communications and business consulting. She served as president of the International Public Relations Association (IPRA) for two consecutive terms, from 1 January 2024 to 31 December 2025. During her presidency, IPRA focused on trusted and ethical public relations in the era of artificial intelligence and published its Gold Paper No. 19 on ethical standards and guidelines for the use of AI in public relations in 2025.

== Early life and education ==
Pavlović Bujas was born on 9 September 1968 in Valjevo, Serbia, where she attended Valjevo Gymnasium. She graduated from the Faculty of Chemistry at the University of Belgrade in 1990 and began her career as an assistant in its Department of Analytical Chemistry. During the early 1990s, she spent periods working on projects in Sweden with NORDRECO and at the University of Campinas in Brazil. She later pursued postgraduate studies at the Faculty of Chemistry in Belgrade and DOBA Faculty in Maribor. She completed education in business and personal coaching accredited by the International Coaching Federation (ICF).

== Business career ==
Pavlović Bujas began her entrepreneurial career in the building-materials sector in the 1990s. To support the market positioning of her business and products, she established an in-house marketing and public relations team. That team developed into Blumen Group, an independent communications and business consulting agency based in Belgrade. The agency has worked for clients in business and culture, including projects associated with BITEF and BEMUS festivals, Days of Belgrade, Bitef Theatre and Zvezdara Theatre.

== International professional work and IPRA presidency ==
Pavlović Bujas's international recognition in public relations included an IPRA Grand Prix in 2012 and IPRA Golden World Award recognition for agency work that year. From 2012 to 2016, she was associated with the Worldcom PR Group; from 2013 to 2015, she served on its board, according to her biographical record. She joined the IPRA Board of Directors in 2019.

In December 2023, the IPRA Board elected Pavlović Bujas as president for 2024. She was the first person from a Balkan country to hold the office, and she subsequently served a second consecutive term in 2025 (the year IPRA marked its 70th anniversary). Her presidency emphasized trust, transparency and ethical practice in public relations amid the growing use of artificial intelligence.

In 2025, IPRA published Gold Paper No. 19, “Ethical Standards and Guidelines for the Use of Artificial Intelligence in Public Relations”. The publication addresses ethical considerations associated with AI in public relations and provides guidance for professional practice. This work was part of IPRA's wider focus during the 2024–2025 presidential period on responsible and trustworthy communication.

== Speaking, mentoring and coaching ==
Pavlović Bujas has worked as a business coach and mentor since the 2010s and has delivered guest lectures and conference presentations in Serbia and internationally. Her mentoring work has included professional development and support for women in business and communications. Her public contributions have addressed communications, marketing, leadership, mentoring and the development of women in professional life.

In 2022, she became alumna in the Fortune Most Powerful Women – U.S. Department of State Global Women's Mentoring Partnership programme.

== Awards and recognition ==
Her biography includes numerous awards and recognitions for her team and herself, and among them:

- 2012 — IPRA Grand Prix.
- 2012 — IPRA Golden World Award for Excellence
- 2013 — Serbian Public Relations Society award for an individual contribution to the development of public relations.
- 2013 — Golden recognition from the Serbian Association for Market Communications (UEPS) for promoting Serbian marketing and PR practice internationally.
- 2013 — Business Partner 2013 Special award for contribution to the development of creative industries in Serbia.
- 2020 – IPRA Golden World Award for Excellence
- 2020 — Award from the Serbian Association of Business Women for mentoring work.

In 2025, Pavlović Bujas received the Woman.Comm PR Star of the Year award and a Woman.Comm Special Star award. The awards recognised her contribution to the profile of the public relations profession in the Balkans and beyond.
