= Matija Bećković =

Serbian poet, writer and academic

Matija Bećković OSS
- Матија Бећковић
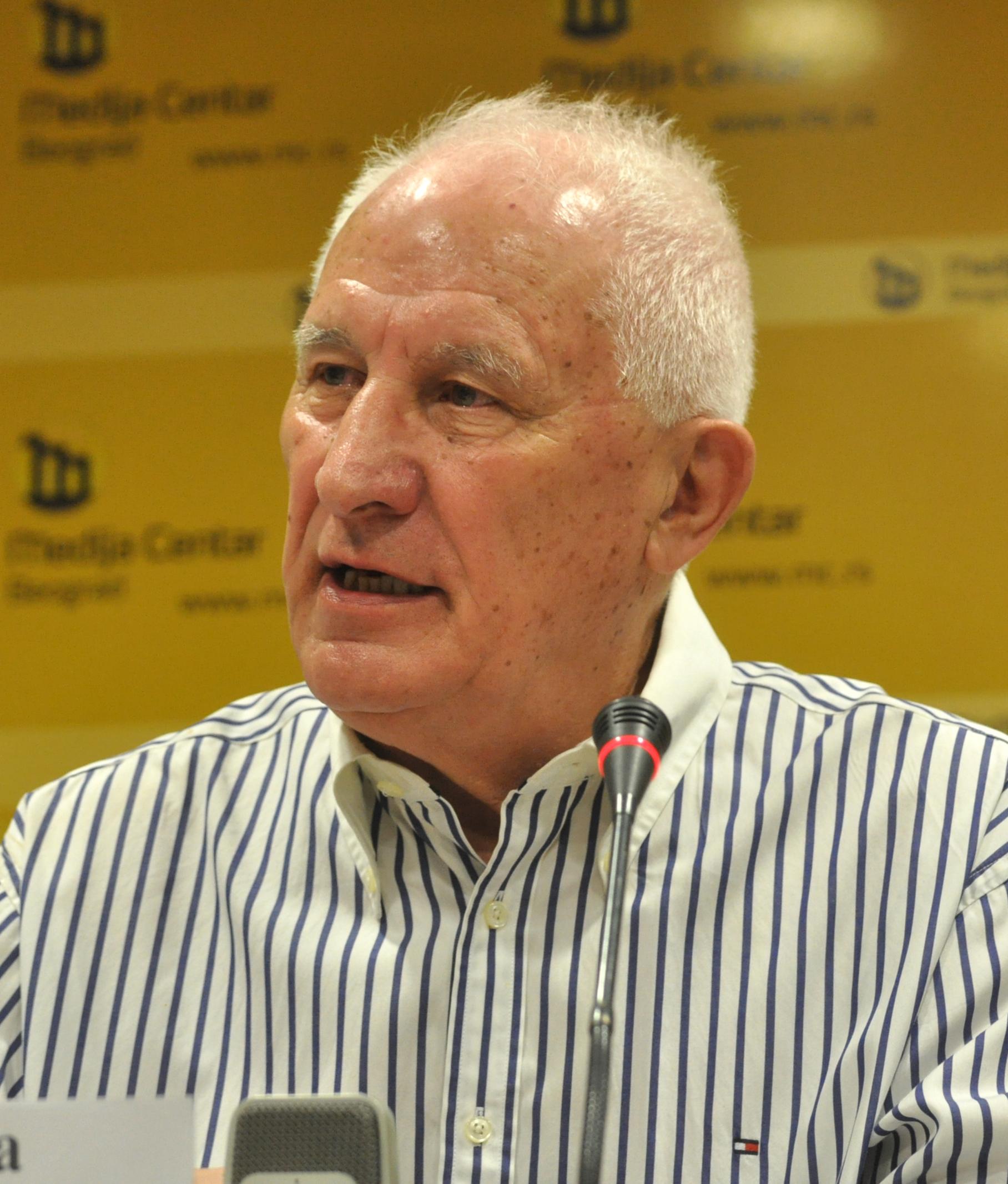
- Bećković in 2015
- Born: 29 November 1939 (age 86); Senta, Kingdom of Yugoslavia
- Education: Valjevo Gymnasium; University of Belgrade Faculty of Philology
- Occupations: Writer, poet
- Spouse: Vera Pavladoljska (m. 1964; died 1998)
- Writing career
- Notable work: Ćeraćemo se još

Matija Bećković (Serbian Cyrillic: Матија Бећковић, pronounced [mǎtija bětɕkoʋitɕ]; born 29 November 1939) is a Serbian poet, writer and academic.

== Life ==
Bećković was born in Senta, in the multiethnic province of Vojvodina (then Danube Banate, Kingdom of Yugoslavia), to a military family of Montenegrin Serbs. Bećković's father Vuk was an officer in the Royal Yugoslav Army, and during World War II the commander of the Rovci Chetnik Battalion and as such, one of the commanders of the leader of the Montenegrin Chetniks, Pavle Đurišić. His father was killed in 1945.

He graduated from the Valjevo Gymnasium in Valjevo in 1958. It was during his gymnasium years in Valjevo that he published his first poem, in the journal 'Mlada Kultura'. Furthermore, it was also in Valjevo that Bećković met Vera Pavladoljska, to whom the poem of the same name, published in 1960, was dedicated. Bećković went on to marry Pavladoljska, and he remained married to her until her death.

Upon graduating from the Valjevo gymnasium, he entered the University of Belgrade, graduating with a degree in Yugoslav and world literature. He became a corresponding member of the Serbian Academy of Sciences and Arts in 1983, becoming a full member in 1991.

Bećković is a close friend of Serbian former Prime Minister Vojislav Koštunica, and an active supporter of his Democratic Party of Serbia.

He has been living in Belgrade since 1960. On the Montenegrin independence referendum, 2006, Bećković did not have a right to vote since he lives in Serbia. However, as a prominent Serb nationalist he fiercely advocated against Montenegrin independence, actively supporting the State Union during the pre-referendum campaign.

In April 2022, Bećković signed a petition calling for Serbia not to impose sanctions on Russia after it invaded Ukraine.

His selected words have been published in 15 volumes by Matica srpska in 2024.

== Poetic style ==
A distinguishing feature of Bećković's poetry is its regionalism. Distinctly Serbian archaic dialect and phraseology permeate his work. This aspect of his work is most often lost when one reads it in translation.

== Awards ==
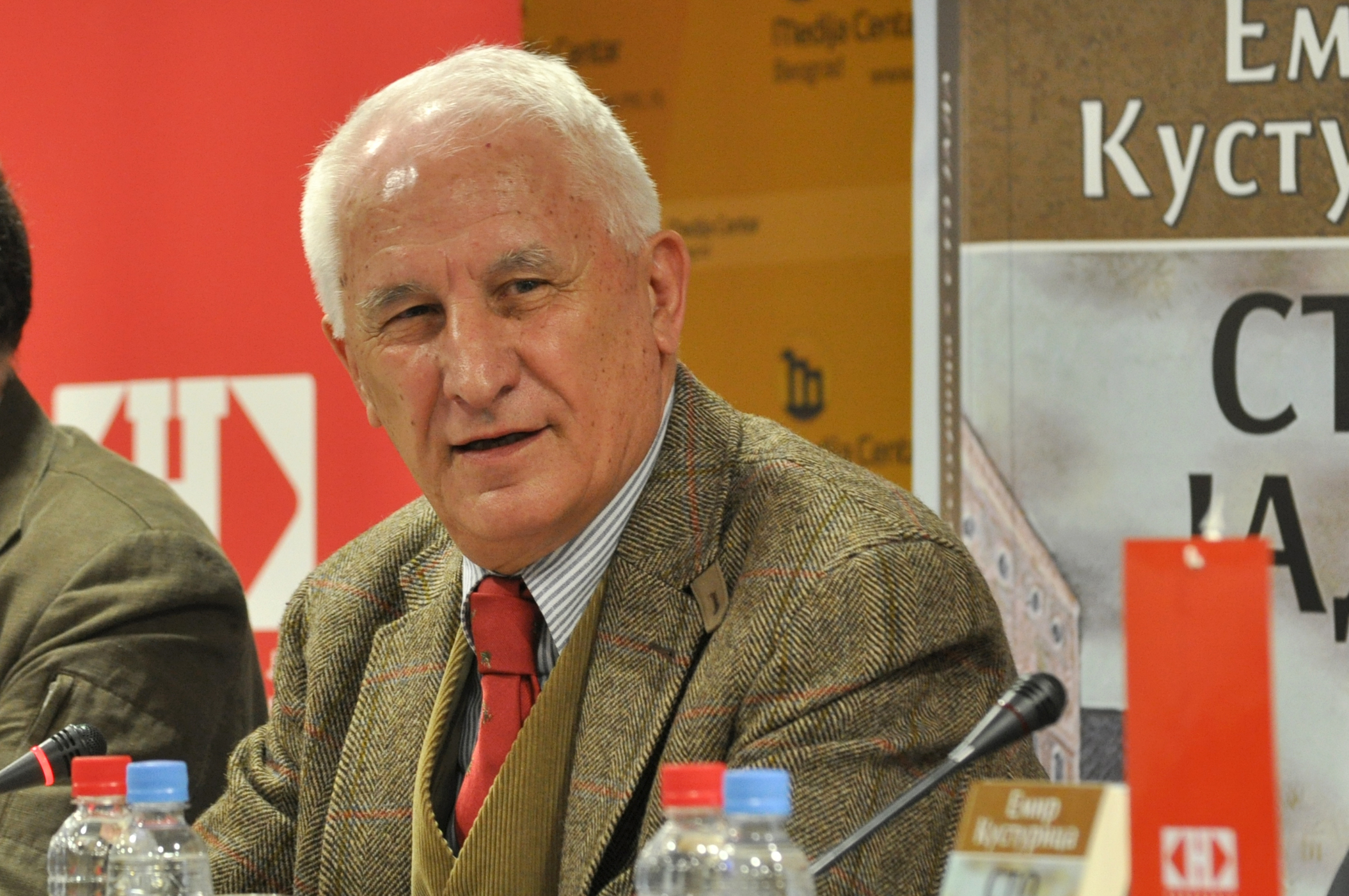
Bećković (2013)

- Grand Cross of the Order of the White Eagle, 2007
- Order of Saint Sava
- Order of Marko Daković
- Radoje Domanović Award
- Marko Miljanov Award, Montenegro
- Milan Rakić Award
- Desanka Maksimović Prize
- Njegoš's Award
- Marko Miljanov Award, Montenegro
- Felix Romuliana Award
- Honorary citizen of Subotica
- October Award
- 7th July Award
- Prosveta Award
- Duško Trifunović Award
- Vinaver's wreath
- The Grand Charter of Branko’s Circle

== Selected works ==
- Vera Pavladoljska
- Metak Lutalica
- Tako je govorio Matija
- Dr. Janez Paćuka o međuvremenu
- O međuvremenu
- ČE: Tragedija koja traje (English: CHE: Permanent Tragedy)
- Reče mi jedan čoek
- Međa Vuka Manitoga
- Lele i kuku
- Dva sveta
- Poeme
- Služba Svetom Savi
- O Njegošu
- Kaža
- Čiji si ti Mali?
- Nadkokot
- Služba
- Sabrane pesme
- Kosovo najskuplja srpska reč
- Ćeraćemo se još
- Kad budem mlađi (Published in English as: When I'm Younger)
- Misli
- Bez niđe nikoga
- Put kojeg nema
- Služba pustinjaku cetinskom
- Besede
- Tri poeme
- Prahu oca poezije
- Sto mojih portreta
- Mojih 80
- Crna Gora - ime jedne vere
- Nigde nikog, nemamo kud (2025)
- Moj drug Đido (Vukotić Medija, 2025)
