= San Pelayo =

San Pelayo can refer to:

- Pelagius of Córdoba, tenth-century Christian martyr
- San Pelayo, Colombia, municipality in Colombia
- San Pelayo, Valladolid, municipality in Province of Valladolid, Spain;
- San Pelayo de Guareña, municipality in Province of Salamanca, Spain;
