= Vladimir Pecikoza =

Serbian archaeologist

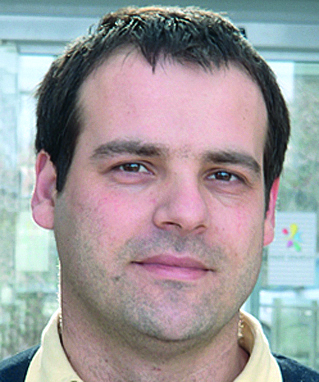
- Born: 1 August 1977 (age 48); Valjevo, Serbia
- Scientific career
- Institutions: Petnica Science Center
- Website: ahl.petnica.rs

Vladimir Pecikoza (Valjevo, August 1, 1977) is a Serbian archaeologist and Head of the Archaeology Department at the Petnica Science Center.

== Early life ==
Pecikoza attended Valjevo Gymnasium and enrolled in the Faculty of Philosophy in Belgrade Department of Archaeology in 1996. He participated at multiple research sites, including

- Petnica - Naselje ispred Male pećine, Petnica cave
- Dvorana sa vigledima, Židovar
- Bela Crkva, Crkvine in the village Rovni (Valjevo), Vignjište - Gračanica, Savinac and Vito in Brezovica, Jerinin grad
- Brangović, Church of St. George, and Anine in village Ćelije near Lajkovac, Crkvine
- Mali Borak

He graduated from Dusan Mihailovic Faculty of Philosophy in Belgrade with a focus on Late Neolithic ovens in the central Balkans. In 2006 he began working in Petnica Science Center as Head of Archeology Department.

== Career ==
Pecikoza's research interests are linked to the Valjevo region in western Serbia, including the Sava, KolubaraDandrina rivers in the Valjevo Mountains.

In 1994 he began to pursue artistic photography, achieving achieved success at national and international exhibitions and competitions. His work was presented in two solo exhibitions at Pecijev Drnča in 1996 and 2010. He participated in the Photo Club, Society for Cerebral Palsy and the School of photography organized by Wikimedia Serbia.

== Bibliography ==
- Arsic R., D. Bulović, Pecikoza V. 2013. The results of new archaeological research in northwestern Serbia and neighboring territories (ed. V. Filipovic, R. Arsić, D. Antonović), Belgrade, Valjevo: Serbian Archaeological Society Institute for the protection of Cultural Monuments Valjevo.
- Arsic R., V. Pecikoza 2012. Povlen from the perspective of archeology. In Povlen - fotomonografija. (Ed. N.Obućina, D. Mihajlović) Valjevo: Valjevo Klub Ars Nova. p. 66-73.
- Pecikoza V. 2011. Decenije discovering its past. In Kolubara National Calendar for the year 2011 simple. (Ed. Z. Rankovic) Valjevo: Publishing Society Kolubara. p. 103-108.
- Pecikoza V. 2010. Deposits of copper and Vinča sites in the area of Valjevo mountains – the contribution to the study of early mining. Kolubara, 5: 39.
- Pecikoza V. 2009. Old mining cemetery in the village of Vreoci, a village on the mountain Rebelj Medvednik. In Kolubara National Calendar for the year 2010. simple. (Ed. Z. Rankovic) Valjevo: Publishing Society Kolubara. p. 172-177.
- Pecikoza V. 2008. Archeology sites in the village of Petnica. In Kolubara Grand National calendar for leap 2009 (ed. Z. Rankovic) Valjevo: Publishing Society Kolubara. p. 167-175.
- Pecikoza V. 2008. Late Neolithic ovens in central Balkans region - Study analysis. Arhaika, 2: 25.
- Pecikoza V. 2008. A mediaeval blacksmith's workshop at Vignjište in Gračanica. Glasnik Srpskog arheološkog društva, 23: 193rd
- Arsic R., V. Pecikoza 2007. Manastir the founder's tomb from the cell near Lajkovac. In Kolubara Grand National calendar for leap 2008 (ed. Z. Rankovic) Valjevo: Publishing Society Kolubara. pp: 144–151.
- Arsic R., Pecikoza V. 2007. Historical atlas From prehistoric to modern times, Belgrade: Srpska škola.
- Pecikoza V. 2007. Turkey's burial place at the location of Knez Milos 22 in Valjevo. Arheološki pregled, 2/3: 111.
- Arsic, R. V. Pecikoza 2007 Rescue archaeological excavations of the church of St. George in cells in Lajkovca. Arheološki pregled, 2.3: 91.
- Arsic R., V. 2006. Pecikoza Monastery and the tomb of cell near Lajkovac. Glasnik Srpskog arheološkog društva, 22: 167.
- Pecikoza V. 2002. History Charts for the 8th grade of primary school, Valjevo: Merlin company.
- Pecikoza V. 2002. History Charts for the 7th grade, Valjevo: Merlin company.
- Pecikoza V. 2002. History Charts for 6th grade of elementary school, Valjevo: Merlin company.
- Pecikoza V. 2002 International ethno - workshop "Moba" in Rovni - one of the aspects of protection of cultural heritage. In Proceedings of the Protection of National Construction (ed. Diana Đedović) Loznica Museum Sails. pp: 89–94.
- Pecikoza V. Arsić, R. 2001. History Charts for the 5th grade of primary school, Valjevo: Merlin company.
- Pecikoza V. 1997. Archaeological sites in the basin of the Upper Kolubara. Zbornik radova Društva istraživača Vladimir Mandic - Manda, 13: 69th
- A. Sepi, Simeunović M., V. 1994. Pecikoza Anatema, Balinović - hillfort settlement from the late Neolithic period. Zbornik radova Društva istraživača Vladimir Mandic - Manda, 11: 7th
- Pecikoza V. 1993. Starčevo culture in the territory of Serbia. Zbornik radova Društva istraživača Vladimir Mandic - Manda, 10: 44.
- Pecikoza V. 1993. Statistics Eneolithic house on the site of Petnica. Petničke sveske, 39: 24.

== Sources ==
- "Three decades of serious work". Journal of petnica Science Center.
- "Bishop's throne in the canyon of the river Gradac". Politika.
- "Mystery hidden grave".
- "Mysterious symbols and skeleton in Valjevo". Blic. 15 December 2014.
