= Odón Elorza =

Spanish politician

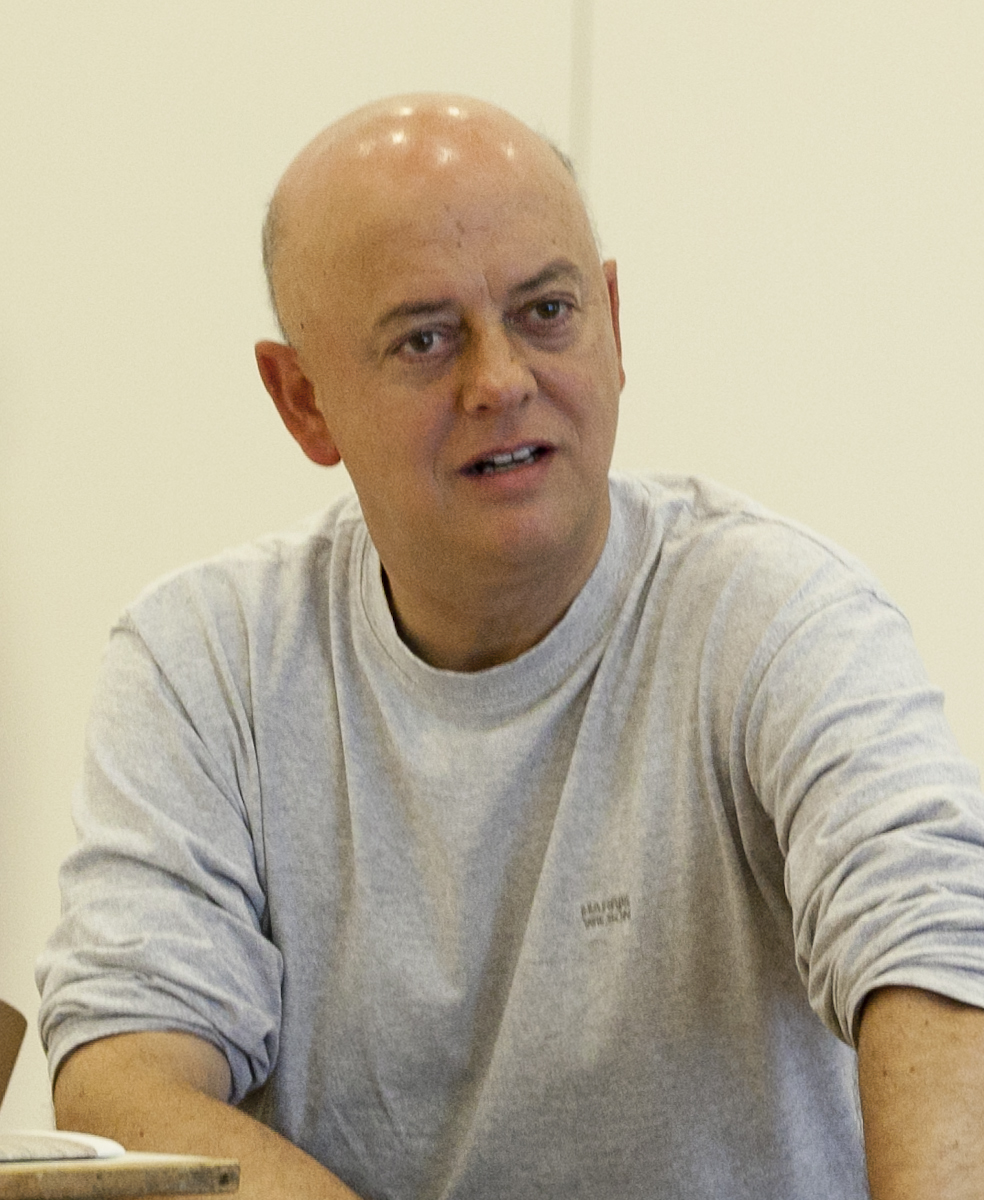
Elorza in 2013

Odon Elorza González (born 4 April 1955) is a Spanish former politician. He was a member of the Spanish Socialist Workers' Party (PSOE) and its branch in the Basque Country, the Socialist Party of the Basque Country–Basque Country Left (PSE-EE). He was a city councillor (1979–2011) and the mayor (1991–2011) of San Sebastián. He was also a member of the Basque Parliament (1984–1991) and the Congress of Deputies (2011–2023).

== Early life and local politics ==
Born in San Sebastián, Basque Country, Elorza was first elected to his hometown's city council in 1979. From 1984 to 1991 he also sat in the Basque Parliament, where he specialised in the areas of housing, infrastructure and media. He left the autonomous body after his election on 20 June that year as the first Socialist mayor of the city.

As mayor, Elorza led coalitions with the Basque Nationalist Party, United Left–Greens and Aralar, all of whom are Basque nationalist. He himself took standpoints that were closer to nationalism than the official lines of his own Spanish Socialist Workers' Party (PSOE)-affiliated party, including criticising the proscription of the left-wing nationalist party Batasuna. Some of the projects which were completed during Elorza's mayoralty included the Kursaal Palace, the renovation of the San Telmo Museoa, the repurposing of the Tabakalera tobacco factory as a cultural centre, and the Anoeta Stadium.

In the May 2011 elections, Elorza's party's vote decreased by 15 percentage points as Juan Carlos Izagirre of EH Bildu replaced him as mayor.

== Congress of Deputies ==
In September 2011, Elorza was made his party's list leader in his home province of Gipuzkoa for the Congress of Deputies election in November, where he was successful.

In October 2016, Elorza was one of 15 Socialist deputies who rebelled against the party line when the party abstained on the vote to invest Mariano Rajoy as prime minister, with the 15 instead choosing to vote against his investiture. In June 2017, he was voted to the PSOE's federal executive committee, as Secretary for Transparency and Participative Democracy.

Elorza resigned in January 2023 due to disagreements with his party. He broke ranks and voted against the nomination of Enrique Arnaldo to the Constitutional Court, for which he was fined €600. He was an ally of Pedro Sánchez while the PSOE were in opposition, but became more critical of the party leadership once Sánchez was prime minister.

== Personal life ==
Elorza received the Creu de Sant Jordi, the second-highest civil distinction of Catalonia, in 2006.

As mayor of San Sebastián in October 2003, Elorza officiated as his PSE-EE ally in the city council, Ernesto Gasco, entered a civil partnership with Iñigo Alonso, another PSE councillor from Lasarte-Oria. It was Spain's first same-sex union between elected politicians, and he also officiated two years later as the same couple became the first office-holders in a same-sex marriage.
