= Carla Antonelli =

Spanish actress and politician (born 1959)

Carla Antonelli Senator
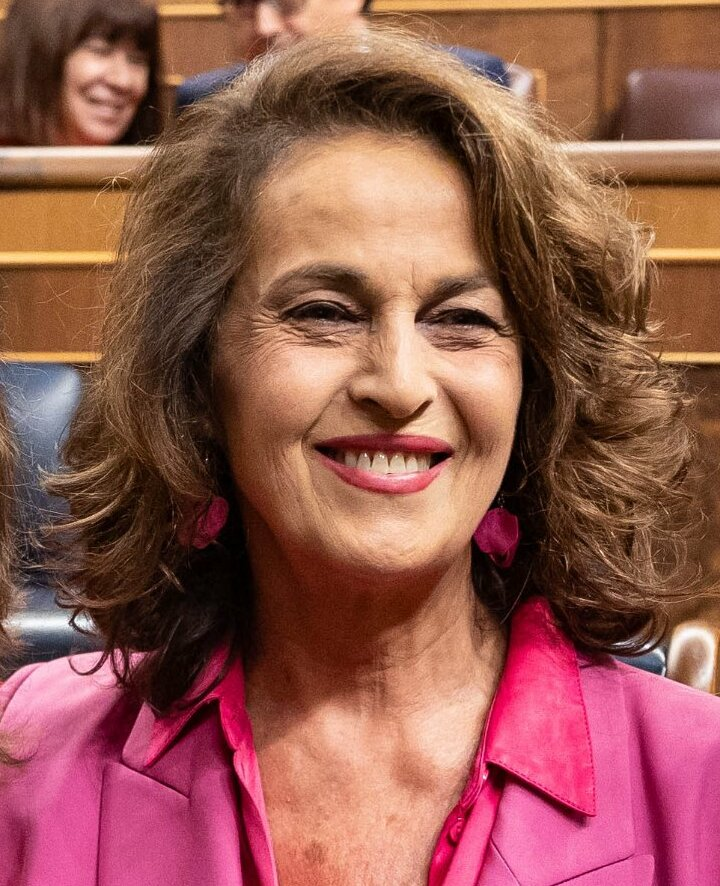
- Antonelli in 2023

Senator of Spain
- Incumbent
- Assumed office 17 August 2023
- Appointed by: Assembly of Madrid

Member of the Assembly of Madrid
- In office 7 June 2011 – 8 June 2021

Member of the Assembly of Madrid
- Incumbent
- Assumed office 13 June 2023

Personal details
- Born: 13 July 1959 (age 67) Güímar, Tenerife, Canary Islands, Spain
- Party: Más Madrid (since 2023); Sumar (since 2023)
- Other political affiliations: Spanish Socialist Workers' Party (1997–2022)
- Occupation: Actress; politician; activist
- Website: carlaantonelli.com

Carla Delgado Gómez (born 13 July 1959), better known by her stage name Carla Antonelli, is a Spanish actress, politician, and LGBT activist. After graduating from a conservatory in Santa Cruz de Tenerife and embarking on an acting career, she subsequently transitioned to politics, serving as a member of the Assembly of Madrid between 2011 and 2021. Originally a member of the Spanish Socialist Workers' Party (PSOE) until 2022, she has served as a national Senator as an independent associated with Más Madrid. A noted activist for the transgender community, Antonelli is the first openly trans person to be elected to the Cortes Generales, as well as the first openly trans person to serve in a regional legislature in Spain.

== Early life ==
Antonelli was born in Güímar in the Canary Islands in 1959. She studied drama at the Conservatory of Music and Dramatic Arts in Santa Cruz de Tenerife before leaving her hometown in 1977 due to experiencing transphobia, which she has attributed to its rural location. That same year, Antonelli commenced her activism when she called for an end to the 1970 Law on dangerousness and social rehabilitation, which had been implemented during the Francoist dictatorship and criminalised homosexuality and targeted the LGBT community. During the transition to democracy following the end of the Franco regime, Antonelli joined the PSOE as she felt it was the party most likely to respect and promote the rights of trans people.

== Media career ==
In 1980, Antonelli took part in a documentary that was the first made in Spain that focused on the transgender community. Initially scheduled to premiere on TVE2, but due to state censorship, it did not air until September 1982, following the failed 1981 Spanish coup d'état attempt.

As an actress, Antonelli is best known for her role as Gloria in the medical drama series El síndrome de Ulises (2007–2008). This marked the first time a transgender actor had a main role on a Spanish television series.

== Activism ==
In 1997, Antonelli began actively working with the PSOE, serving as the co-ordinator of the transgender faction of its federal LGBT group. She contributed to the PSOE's electoral programme on the issues of same-sex marriage and gender identity laws.

In 2004, the PSOE won the general election on a platform that supported same-sex marriage and gender recognition for trans people, but the latter legislation was delayed passing through the Congress of Deputies. Antonelli threatened to go on hunger strike if the legislation was not passed by the Council of Ministers. The law was subsequently approved and signed by José Luis Rodríguez Zapatero, the Prime Minister of Spain, and Juan Carlos I, the King of Spain on 17 March 2007. Antonelli subsequently became the first person in the Community of Madrid to legally change her gender.

In July 2007, Antonelli stopped working for the PSOE in order to take up a main role on El síndrome de Ulises. She subsequently acted as a spokesperson for the Federación Estatal de Lesbianas, Gays, Transexuales y Bisexuales and gave talks on transgender rights both in Spain and also internationally, including in Venezuela, Chile, Mexico, Cuba, Colombia and Argentina.

Antonelli is an advocate for the legalisation of sex work, and has commented on the large proportion of trans people who take part in it.

== Political career ==
Having been associated with the PSOE since the late 1970s, in the 2011 regional elections, she was elected as a PSOE member of the Assembly of Madrid, becoming the first openly transgender woman to be elected to parliamentary office in Spain. After being elected in 2015 and 2019, she lost her seat in the 2021 regional elections after the PSOE only won 24 seats in Madrid, with Antonelli placed 35th on the electoral list.

Antonelli announced on 18 October 2022 that she was leaving the PSOE due to discrepancies with regards to its attitudes towards LGBT people. Declaring herself as an independent, on 23 June 2023, Más Madrid announced that she would replace Pablo Gómez Perpinyà as their next Senator by regional designation. On 17 August 2023, she took office, making her the first trans woman to serve in the upper house of the Spanish government.

== Film and television work ==
- Hijos de papá (dir. Rafael Gil, 1980)
- Corridas de alegría (dir. Gonzalo García Pelayo, 1980)
- Pepe no me des tormento (dir. José María Gutiérrez, 1980)
- Las guapas y locas chicas de Ibiza (dir. Siggi Ghotz, 1981)
- Adolescencia (dir. Germán Llorente, 1982)
- Extraños (dir. Imanol Uribe, 1999)
- Tío Willy (TVE, 1999)
- Periodistas (Telecinco, 2000)
- Policías (Antena 3, 2001)
- El comisario (Telecinco, 1999 and 2002)
- El síndrome de Ulises (Antena 3, 2007)
- El vuelo del tren (dir. Paco Torres, 2009)
