= Ernesto Gasco =

Spanish politician

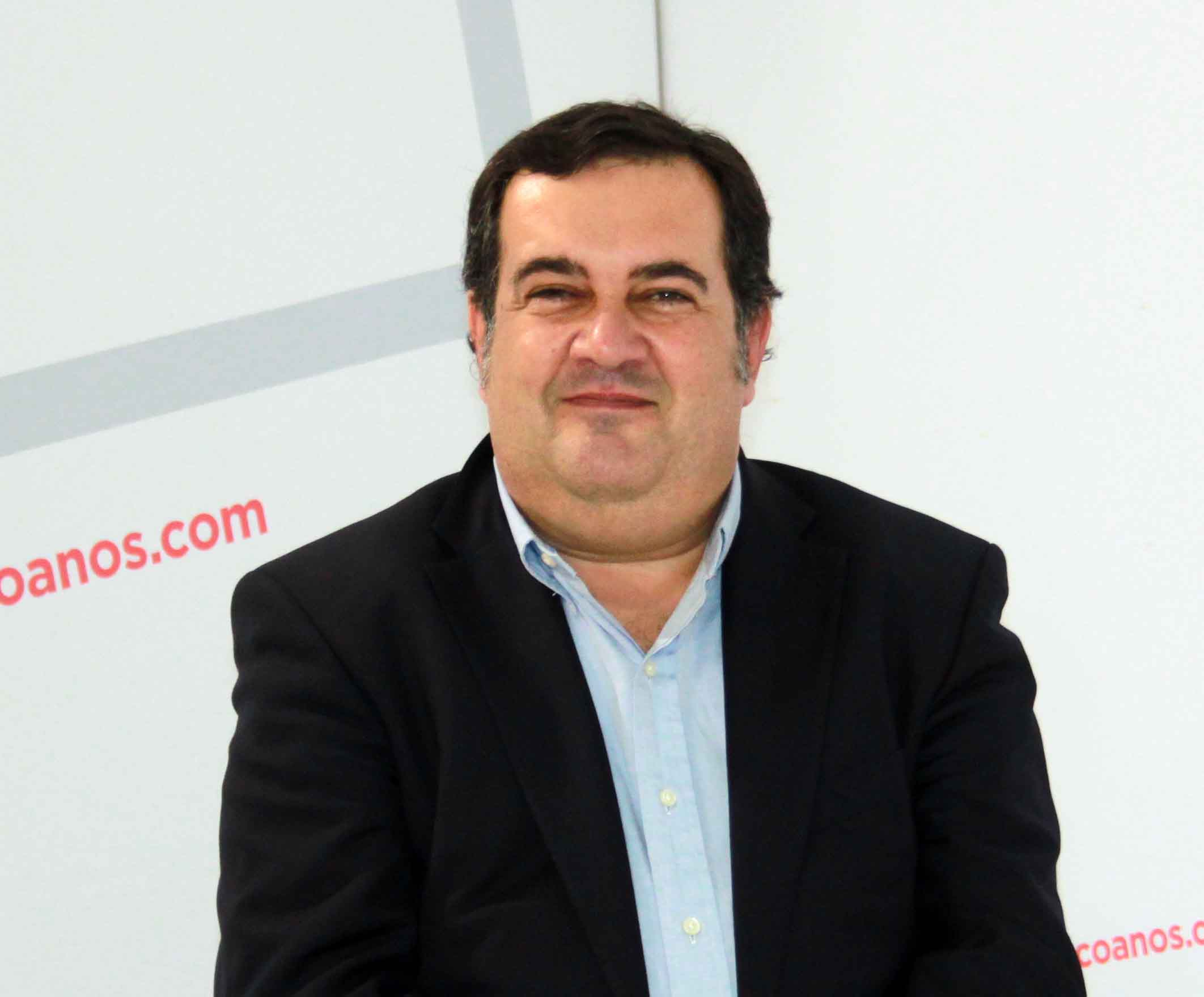
- Gasco in December 2013

Member of the Congress of Deputies
- In office 2008–2009

Personal details
- Born: 24 July 1963 (age 63) San Sebastián, Spain
- Party: Spanish Socialist Workers' Party (PSOE)
- Education: Autonomous University of Madrid

Ernesto José Gasco Gonzalo (born 24 July 1963) is a Spanish Socialist Workers' Party (PSOE) politician.

He was a councillor in San Sebastián from 1995 to 2020, and a member of the Congress of Deputies from 2008 to 2009. He was the first openly gay member of the Congress of Deputies. He and his husband Iñigo Alonso were the first elected politicians in Spain to enter a same-sex civil partnership and later marriage.

== Early and personal life ==
Born in San Sebastián in the Basque Country, Gasco graduated in geography from the Autonomous University of Madrid.

In October 2003, Gasco was one of the first two elected Spanish politicians to enter a same-sex civil partnership with another one, alongside Iñigo Alonso, a councillor for the same party in Lasarte-Oria. The ceremony was officiated by Odón Elorza, the mayor of San Sebastián. In September 2005, Gasco and Alonso were the first same-sex couple of office-holders in Spain to be married, again by Elorza.

== Political career ==
Gasco was first elected onto San Sebastián's city council in 1995, serving government roles as his party governed under Elorza until 2011. In 2015, his party returned to local government and he was put in charge of business, hospitality and tourism; he called for attracting French tourists to the border city and expanding into health tourism.

Gasco was elected to the Congress of Deputies in 2008, the first openly gay member of the legislature. In April 2009, he announced his resignation to be Deputy Minister of Transport in the Basque Government under regional president Patxi López.

In January 2020, Gasco resigned from San Sebastián city council to return to national politics, as High Commissioner against Child Poverty in the second government of Pedro Sánchez.

== See also ==
- List of LGBT politicians in Spain
