= Petnica Science Center =

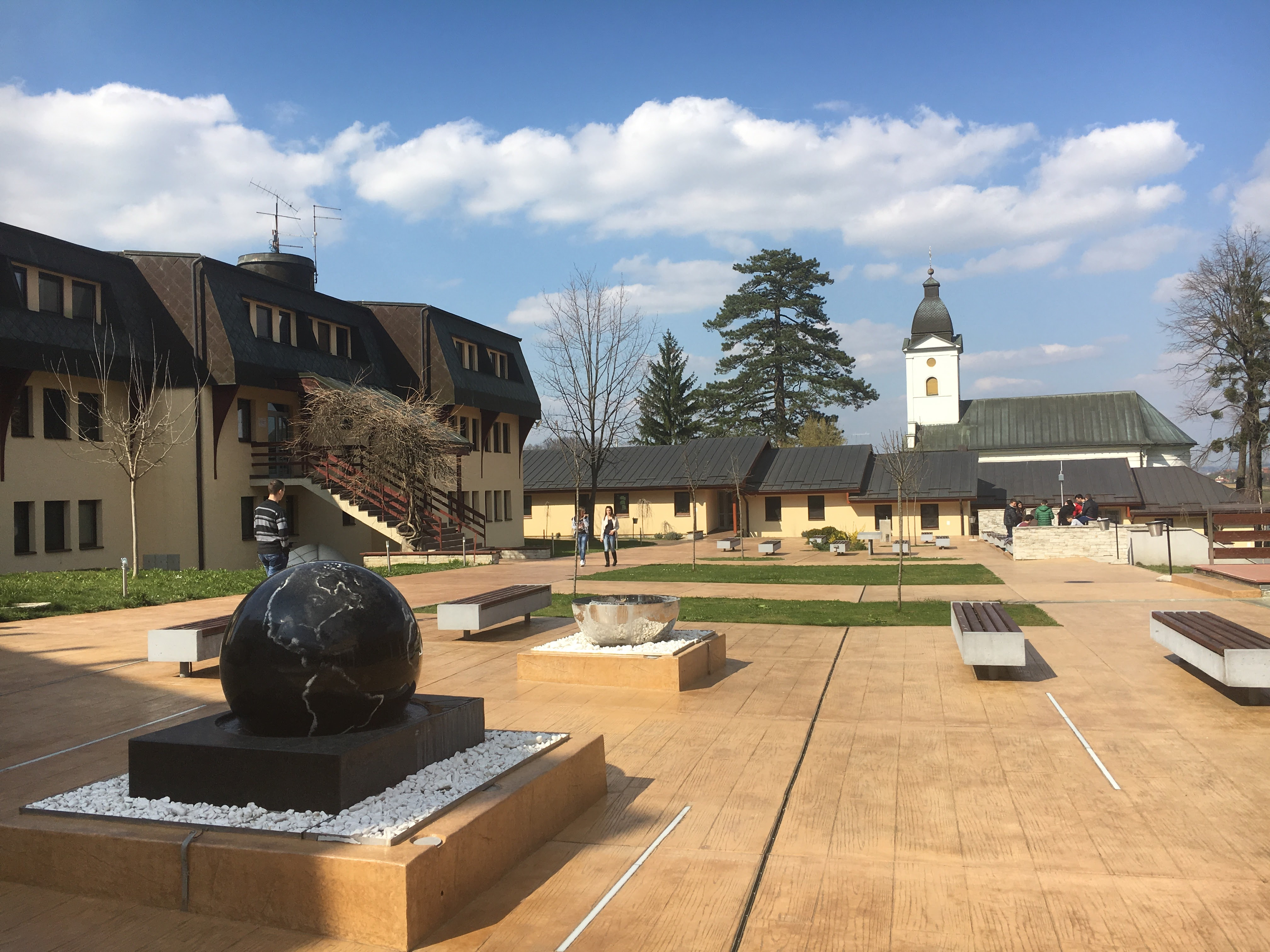
Petnica Science Center Yard

Petnica Science Center (pronounced [pɛ̌ːtnitsa]) (PSC) (Serbian: Истраживачка станица Петница, romanized: Istraživačka stanica Petnica) is an independent and nonprofit organization for extracurricular, formal and informal, science education located near Valjevo, Serbia. PSC has organized more than 3000 programs (seminars, workshops, research camps, conferences, etc.) since its opening, for nearly 50,000 students and science teachers in 15 disciplines of science, technology and humanities, with more than 7,000 lecturers.

== History ==
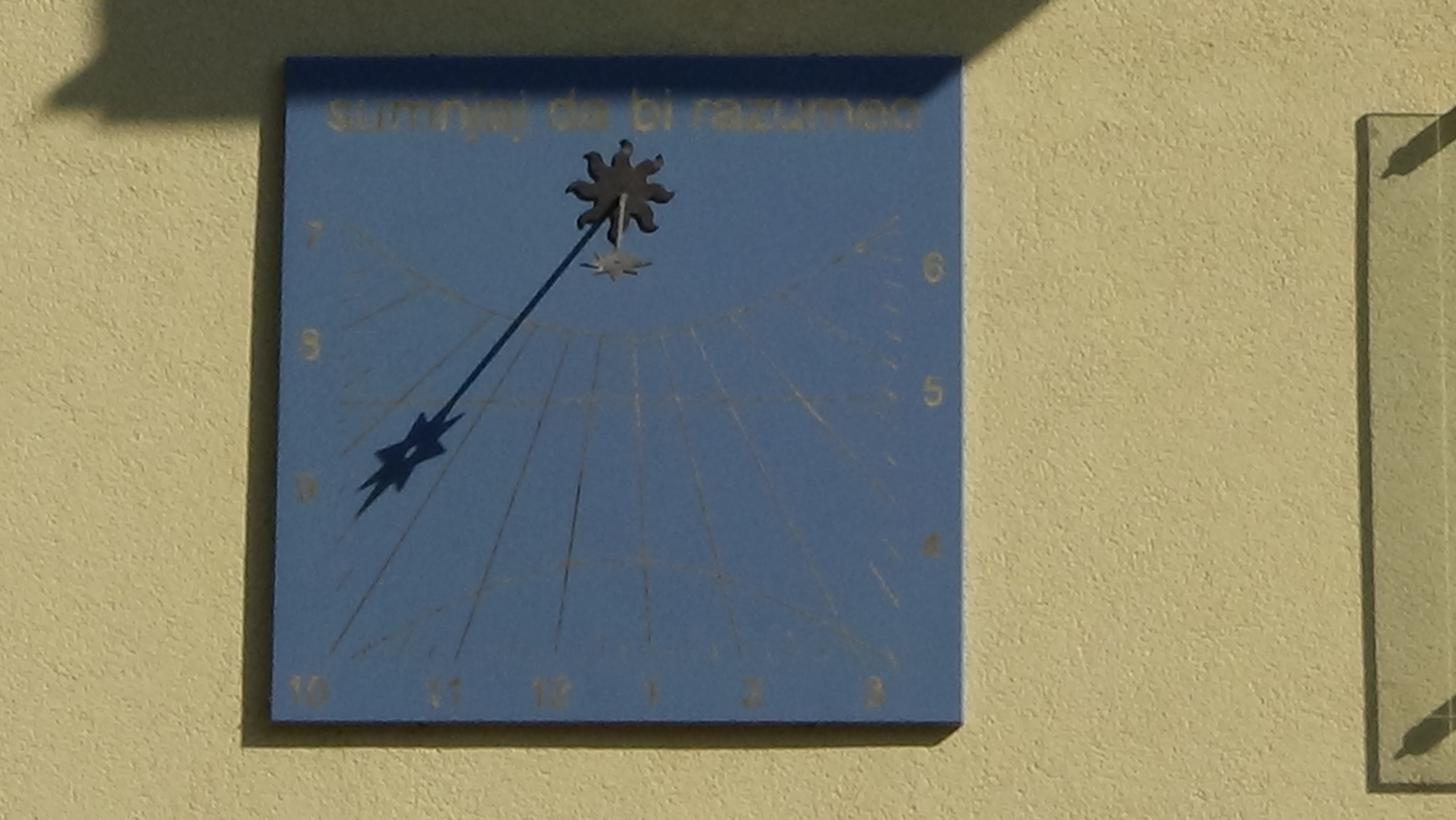
Quote "Question to understand" (Serbian: Sumnjaj da bi razumeo) at Petnica Research Station.

Petnica Science Center was founded in 1982 as a Yugoslavian scientific center for elementary and high school high-achieving students, for extracurricular activities, supervised by university professors, researchers from various Yugoslav and (mostly) Serbian Institutes, and research assistants and graduate and postgraduate students. PSC states, on its website, to be "the biggest and, probably, the oldest (such center) in South Eastern Europe".

In 2010 reconstruction of Petnica's facilities began. The following works were carried out:

- The accommodation facility - construction of new building on the existing foundation and basement.
- Laboratory - new construction on the site of the old laboratory, which had collapsed
- Teaching Center - reconstruction
- Restaurant with gallery - building the new facility; existing object converted into a gallery
- Library - reconstruction
- Landscape planning - planning of the entire complex with many facilities

== Aims ==
The majority of PSC programs are designed for secondary-school students, although there are a lot of programs for primary-school pupils. There are special seminars and activities for university students and science teachers.

PSC nourishes international character and attendants of regular Petnica programs come not only from all countries of former Yugoslavia, but also from other (mostly Balkans and European) countries. Most of the courses are being taught in the Serbian language, with which former Yugoslavians are familiar. International camps and conferences are held in English and, in lesser part, in Russian.

== Petnica International ==
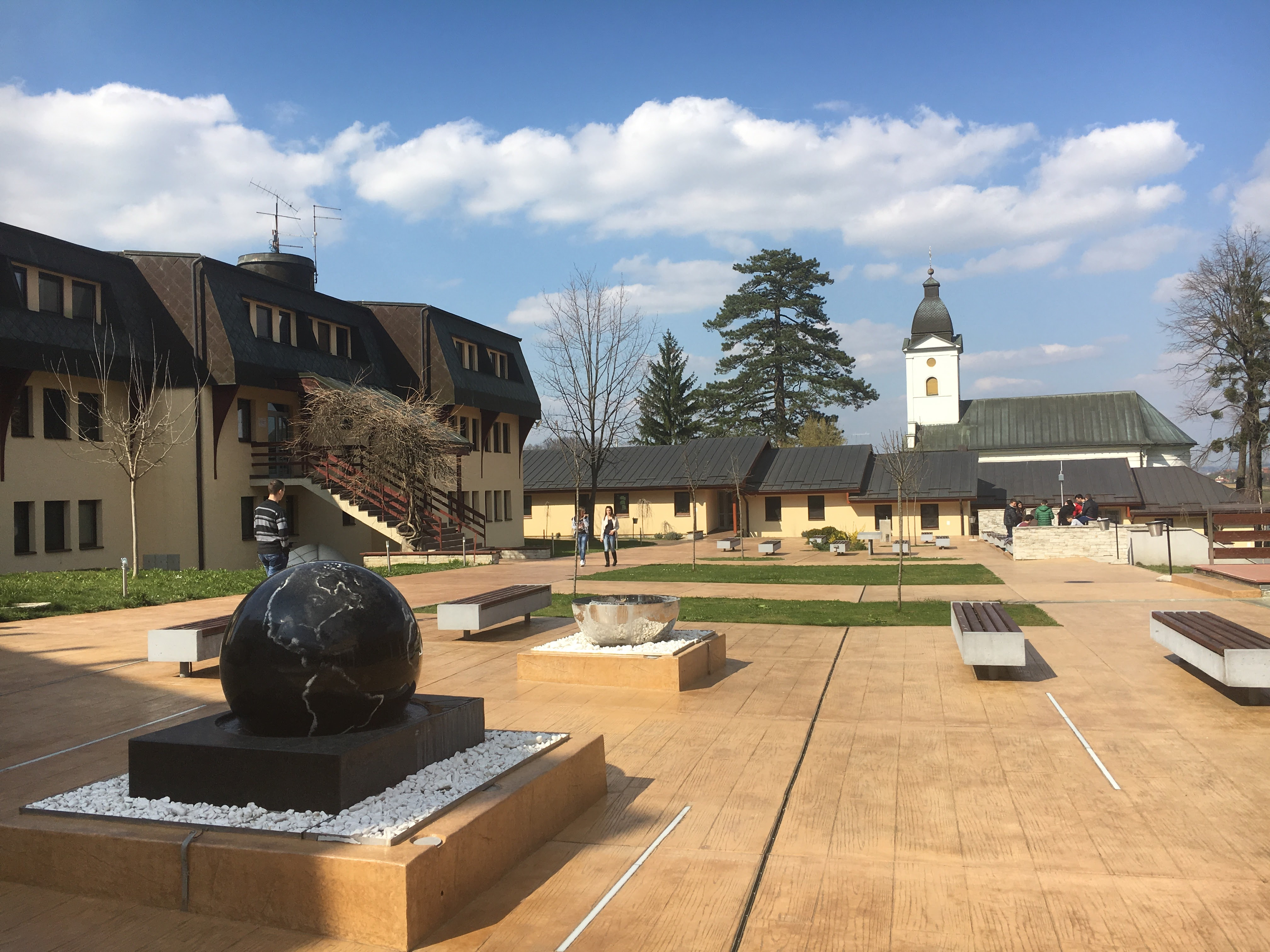
Petnica Science Center Yard. Petnica church tower is visible in the background.

Petnica International (PI) is one of the PSC programs held in English. PI is organized once a year, for international participants. Students 17 to 21 years old plan and realize real-life scientific projects in one of 15 disciplines (Mathematics, Physics, Astronomy, Electronics, Computer Science and Robotics, Biology, Molecular Biomedicine, Chemistry, Geology, Geography, Archeology, History, Linguistics, Sociology, and Psychology). PI takes place in July and August every year and lasts for 15 days.

Professor Ivan Aničin of the Faculty of Physics, University of Belgrade, and Institute of Physics Belgrade is President of Scientific Committee of Youth International Scientific Conference, "A Step into Science", organized by Petnica Science Center, and a great contributor and patron of Petnica Science Center, PSC.

Petnica Science Centre is located in the village Petnica, near Valjevo (Western Serbia). It has fully equipped boarding facilities with 100-bed dormitories and a restaurant, and possesses numerous laboratories, classrooms, big and multi-functional library with a carefully designed Teaching Resource Center.

Students and teachers, participants at some of PSC's programs, have access to rich library with over 40,000 books and journals, and computer database with thousands of electronic journals and books, and Teacher Resource Center with specific training capacities.

PSC has 35 computers dispersed through PSC's facilities, which are accessible 24-hours a day, and laboratories and professional workshops of different types and functions. PSC is member of National research and education network - National Academic Internet Network (AMRES), and is connected, by optical cables, to its 10 Gbit/s grid and internet. PSC owns various types of teaching and research-grade equipment. It is used for students' individual projects and research activities.
