= Establishment =

Establishment may refer to:

- The Establishment, a dominant group or elite that controls a polity or an organization
- The Establishment (club), a 1960s club in London, England
- The Establishment (Pakistan), political terminology for the military deep-state in Pakistan
- The Establishment (football), an organization or individuals alleged to have manipulated results in Turkish football
- Establishment of a state religion or established church
- Establishment, participation in economic life "on a stable and continuous basis" in the European Single Market
- ESTABLISHED, a Transmission Control Protocol connection state

== See also ==
- Anti-establishment, in opposition to the conventional social, political, and economic principles of a society
- Dissolution (law), with respect to an entity that was previously legally established
- Disestablishmentarianism, a movement to end the Church of England's status as an official church
- Establiments, a residential district in the Balearic Islands
- Establishment Clause of the First Amendment to the United States Constitution, forming the right of freedom of religion
- Establishment Division, the human resource arm of the Government of Pakistan
- Category:Establishments
