= Establiments =

Residential district in the Balearic Islands

Coordinates: 39.6264°N 2.6219°E

Establiments is a residential district in the Balearic Islands, northwest of Palma de Mallorca, Spain. The name is derived from the Catalan word for "establishments".

== History ==
Establiments dates to the 16th century, although the area surrounding the district has been occupied for much longer.

Prehistoric remains were found in the Son Bauçà caves and Ca’n Mallol, as well as some talaiòtic remains.

During the period when much of Spain was under Muslim rule, approximately from the 700s-1400s AD, agriculture developed in the area.

After the conquest of Mallorca by the Crown of Aragon, the land was transferred to Nunó Sanç. For centuries, the agrarian structure of the area was rooted in possessions of large estates. Establiments emerged from upland rustic parceling of these possessions." The name Establiments comes from the word for "establishments" or possessions in Mallorquin, a dialect of Catalan.

The first possessió parcelled was Son Gual which is now Establiments Vells, named El Rutló. The refuge d'es Rutló was documented for the first time in 1584, with 14 parcels. In the 12th century began the parceling of d'es Muntant from the "possessió" de Sarrià, which eventually came to be known as Establiments Nous. In 1685 the vells had 69 parcels and the nous had 33.

For several centuries Establiments was part of Esporles, but after a time, an independent municipality was formed. In the Cardenal Despuig map of 1785 the large "possessions" of Es Canyar, Son Cotoneret, Son Gual, Bunyolí (documented around 1402), Sarrià, Son Morlà, Son Mallol i Son Berga appear, most as the property of families of nobility. In 1776 Son Berga Nou was built. Considered one of the most beautiful Majorquin "possessions" it was the property of the Safortesa family.

In 1837, Establiments was separated from Esporles and became an independent municipality. In 1847, it had a population of 1460. 367 houses occupied an area of 22.55 km^{2} (8.707 mi^{2}). Throughout the 19th century the municipality's principal occupation was farming, and the principal crops were wheat, barley, almonds, olive oil, carob beans and legumes. During the 1870s, the principal "possessiones" were Sarrià (426 ha), Bunyolí (376 ha), Son Gual (195 ha), Son Morlà (95 ha), and Es Canyar (84 ha).

In the first half of the 20th century three tissue factories, a shoe factory and a mosaics factory were established.

In 1910, Establiments was annexed by Palma de Mallorca and officially gained the category of neighborhood. Many of its original features were preserved, similar to the neighborhood of Son Espanyol. It is likely that the reason for its annexation was a combination of economic troubles and political squabbling between liberal and conservatives.

In 1926, Establiments obtained an electric tram line whose trolley cars departed from Sant Miquel Street. This tram served until 1959 when it was replaced by a bus line. In 1933 Joan Colom's cement factory started the quarries exploitation, which caused a lot of problems. During the Spanish Civil War prominent figures such as the administrator of Socialist Youngsters Antoni Roca Lladó, and the esporlerist socialist and Establiments resident, Gabriel Calafell Serra, were imprisoned and executed. This caused some residents to seek refuge.

A tourist boom in the 1950s decreased agriculture and many factories closed. An important collective of immigrants from the Peninsula arrived, which the native people called strangers (forasters in Catalan).

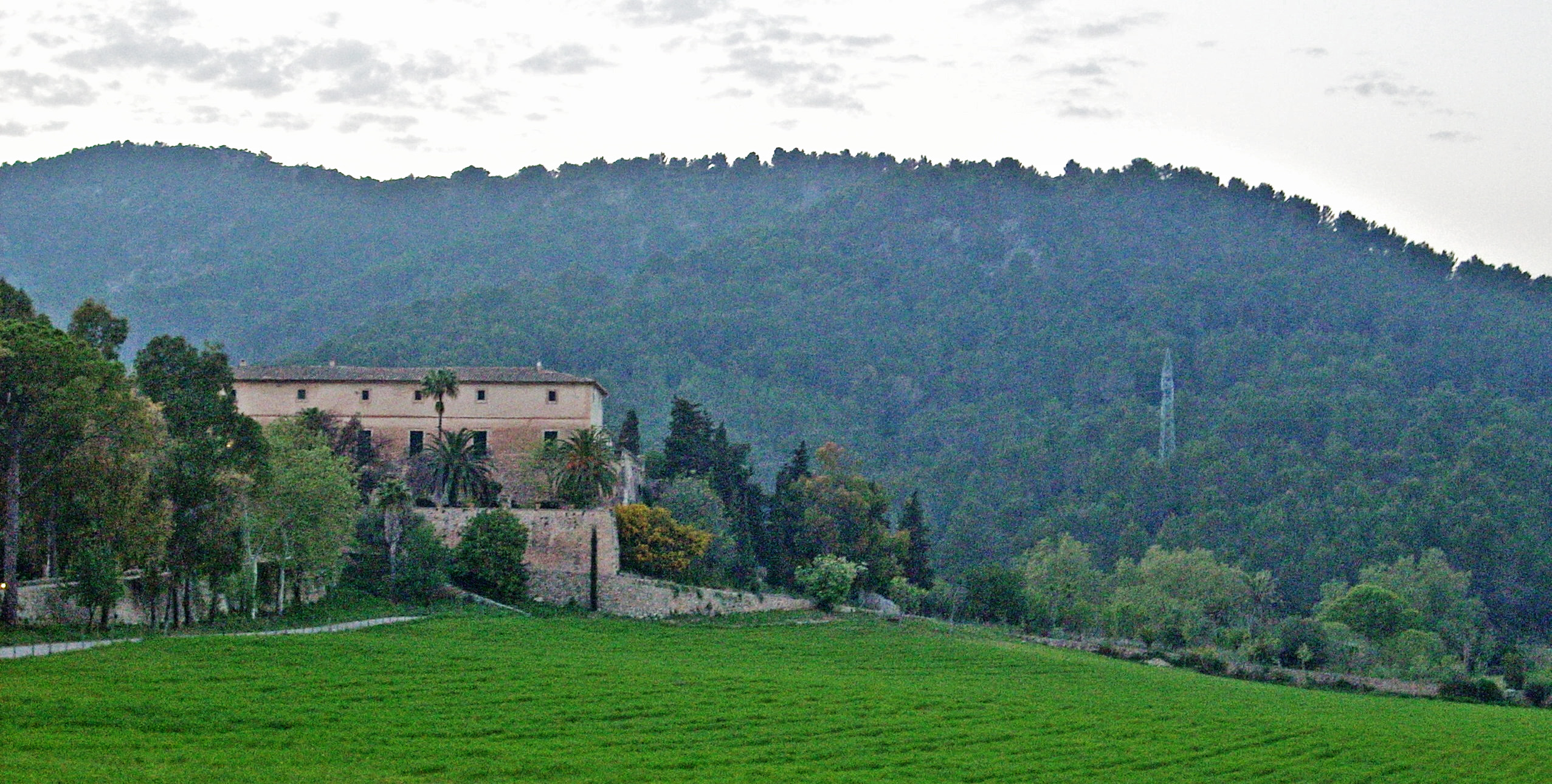
Sarrià "possessió"

== Boundaries ==
The district borders the municipalities of Esporles and Puigpuñent to the north and west, respectively. It borders the districts of Son Anglada and Secar de la Real to the south and the suburb of Son Espanyol to the east.

== Coat of arms ==
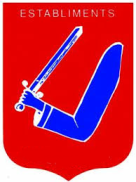
Establiments' Coat of Arms

The Coat of arms is a visual of a blue arm holding a sword painted on a red background.
