= Miquel Ensenyat =

Spanish politician

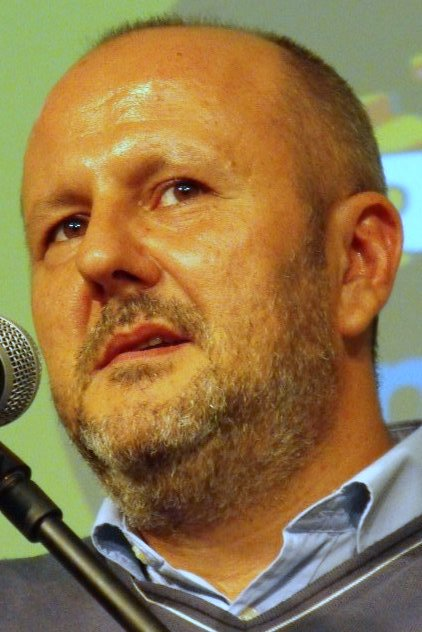

Miquel Ensenyat Riutort (born 30 October 1969) is a Spanish politician of the party Més per Mallorca. He was the mayor of Esporles (2005–2015), the president of the Island Council of Mallorca (2015–2019) and his party's leader in the Parliament of the Balearic Islands (2019–).

== Biography ==
Ensenyat was born in Banbury, Oxfordshire, England to Mallorcan immigrants. He graduated in Social Education, and also studied theology and philosophy before moving to the town of Esporles at the age of 24.

In 2003, Ensenyat was the lead candidate of the Socialist Party of Majorca (PSM) in the municipal elections in Esporles. They lost to the People's Party (PP), but through a motion of no confidence, he became mayor in 2005, serving for a decade. In 2011, he was elected to Mallorca's Island Council as third in Més's list, and was an unsuccessful candidate in elections to the Congress of Deputies.

Ensenyat became president of the Island Council in June 2015, with the support of fellow left-wing parties the Socialist Party of the Balearic Islands (PSIB) and Podemos. In June 2018, he took 68% of the votes to be Més's candidate in the 2019 Balearic regional election, ahead of Fina Santiago. He was elected, while the party fell from six to four seats.

Ensenyat is in favour of ensuring the civil rights of LGBT people, as well as defending the Catalan language and Mallorcan culture and heritage. As a gay man and a Catholic, he wrote to bishops to denounce priests endorsing right-wing candidates. Ensenyat has been harassed and threatened over his sexual orientation.
