= Jaime de los Santos (politician) =

Spanish politician (born 1978)

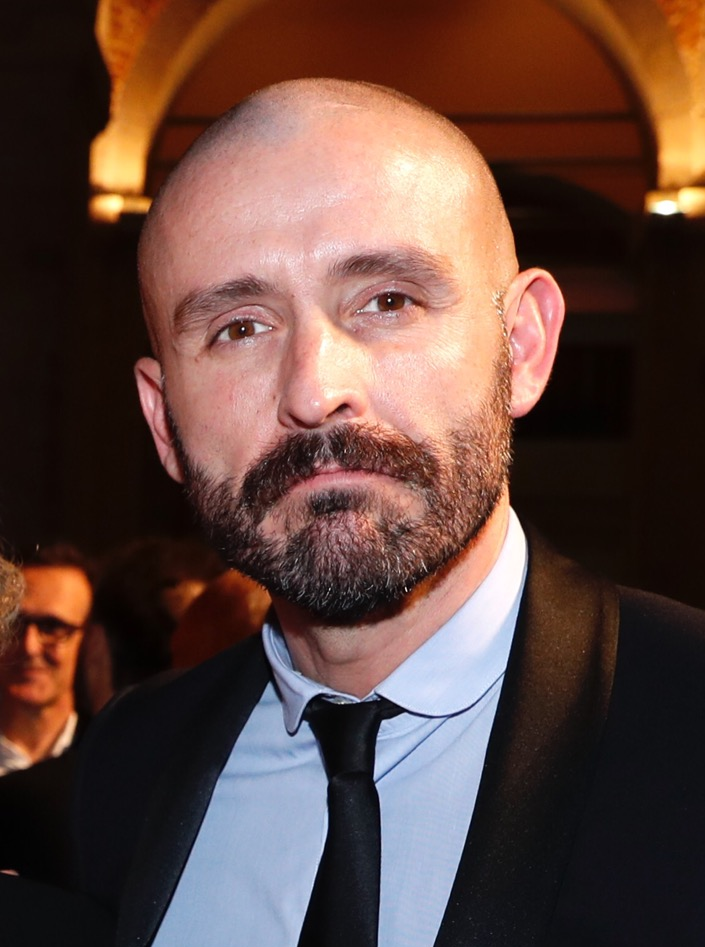

Member of the Congress of Deputies
- Incumbent
- Assumed office 17 August 2023
- Constituency: Madrid

Member of the Senate
- In office 9 July 2021 – 29 May 2023
- Appointed by: Assembly of Madrid

Personal details
- Born: 6 August 1978 (age 48)
- Party: People's Party

Jaime Miguel de los Santos González (born 6 August 1978) is a Spanish politician serving as a member of the Congress of Deputies since 2023. From 2021 to 2023, he was a member of the Senate.
