= Gátova =

- Municipality
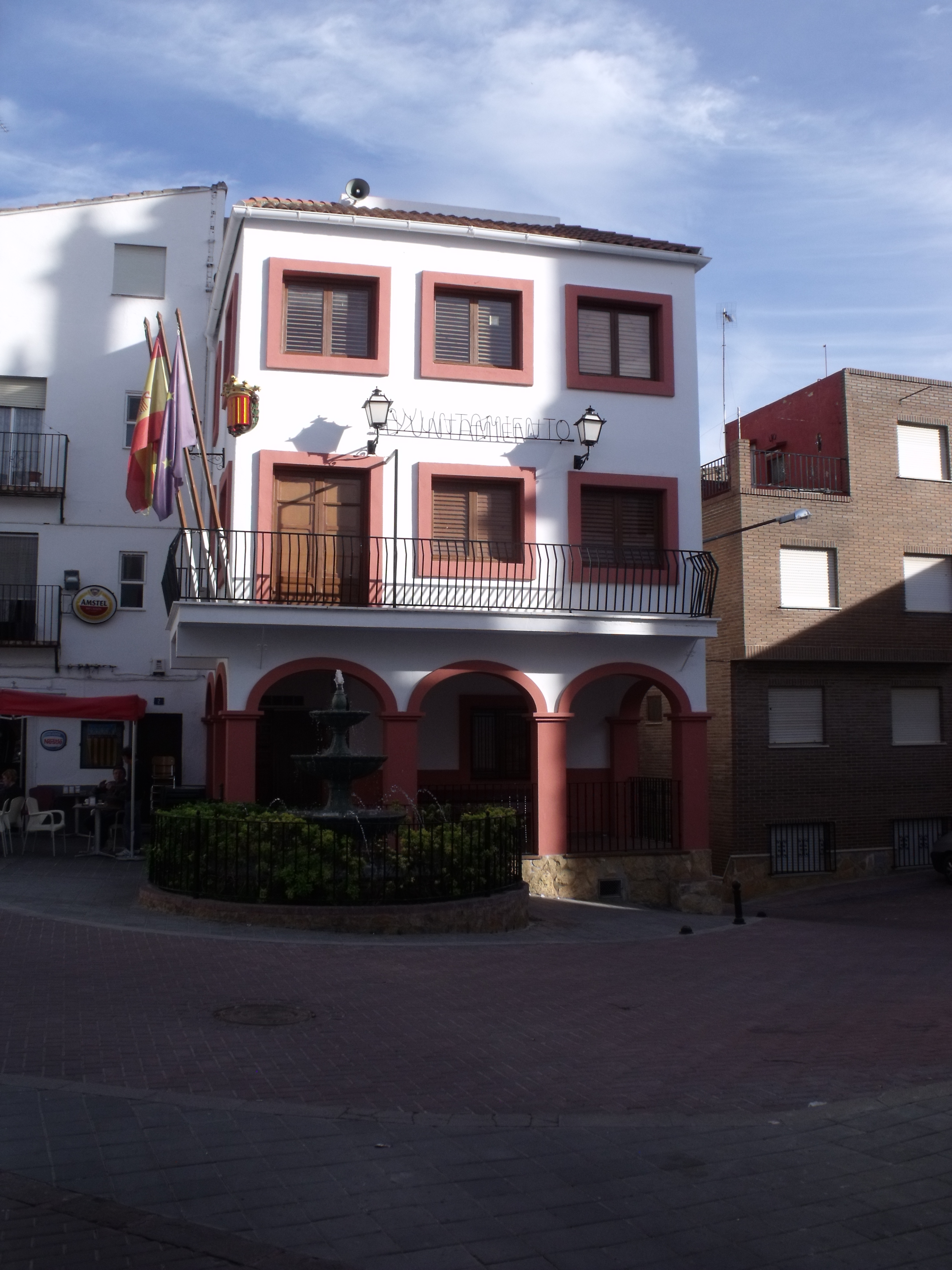
- Town hall

- Coat of arms

- Location in Spain
- Coordinates: 39°46′10″N 0°31′16″W
- Country: Spain
- Autonomous community: Valencian Community
- Province: Valencia
- Comarca: Camp de Túria
- Judicial district: Llíria

Government
  - Mayor: Jesús Salmerón

Area
  - Total: 30.4 km^{2} (11.7 sq mi)
- Elevation: 560 m (1,840 ft)

Population (2025-01-01)
  - Total: 452
  - Density: 14.9/km^{2} (38.5/sq mi)
- Demonym(s): Gatovero, ra
- Time zone: UTC+1 (CET)
  - Summer (DST): UTC+2 (CEST)
- Postal code: 46169
- Official language(s): Spanish
- Website: Official website

Gátova (Valencian: Gàtova) is a municipality in the comarca of Camp de Túria in the Valencian Community, Spain.

The town is situated in the heart of the Serra Calderona, a natural protected park in Valencia.

== See also ==
- List of municipalities in Valencia
