= Iñaki Oyarzabal =

Spanish politician

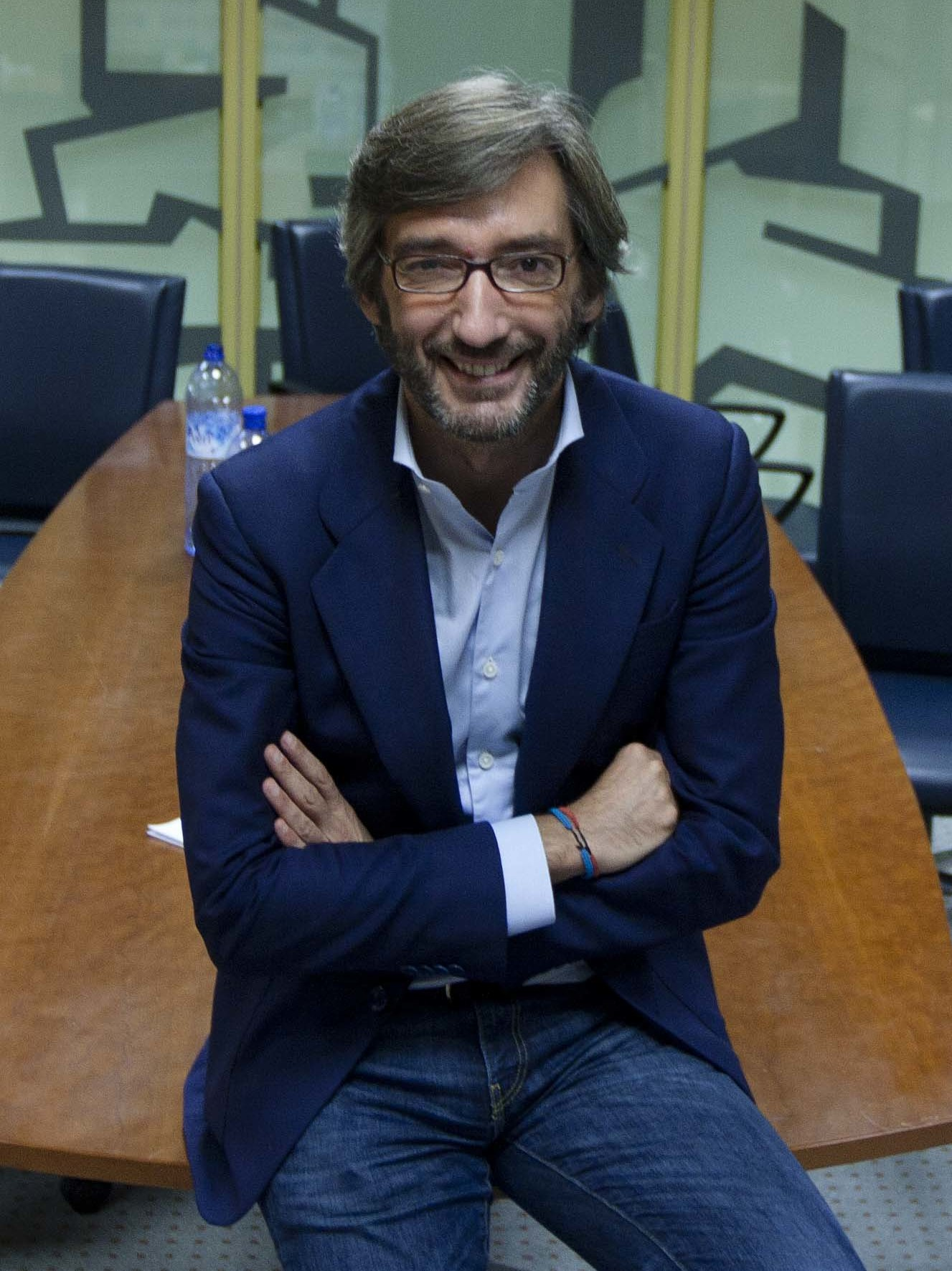
Oyarzabal in 2013

Iñaki Oyarzabal Miguel (born 1966) is a Spanish People's Party (PP) politician. He was a member of the Basque Parliament (1996–2016) and the Senate of Spain (2015–2019), and has been part of his party's national executive since 2012, the first openly gay person to do so. He is considered part of the party's centrist faction.

== Biography ==
Oyarzabal was born in Vitoria-Gasteiz, Álava in the Basque Country. He began his political involvement at age 18 with the People's Democratic Party (PDP) which merged into the People's Party (PP) in 1989.

Oyarzabal was voted onto his hometown's council in 1995 and to the Basque Parliament the following year, remaining in the latter until 2016. In 2008, he moved from being secretary general of the PP in his home province to the equivalent in the People's Party of the Basque Country under Arantza Quiroga, holding the role until March 2014. In February 2012, he was made his party's national Secretary for Justice, Rights and Liberties. Four months later, he came out as gay to be named in a list of the 50 most influential LGBT people in Spain published by El Mundo; he was the first member of the PP executive to come out as gay. In June 2019, Oyarzabal criticised an LGBT pride event in Madrid for barring representatives of any party working with Vox, which then meant the PP and Citizens.

Oyarzabal was elected to the Senate of Spain for the Álava constituency in the 2015 general election as the PP's only representative in the constituency, and kept his seat in the 2016 general election. At the start of the following year, he was appointed president of the PP in the province, after Javier de Andrés became the government delegate in the Basque Country. He lost his seat in the April 2019 election, coming tenth in the four-seat constituency. He was named as his party's lead candidate in the constituency for the 2023 election, falling short again in eighth place.
