= Raúl Díaz Marín =

Spanish politician (born 1988)

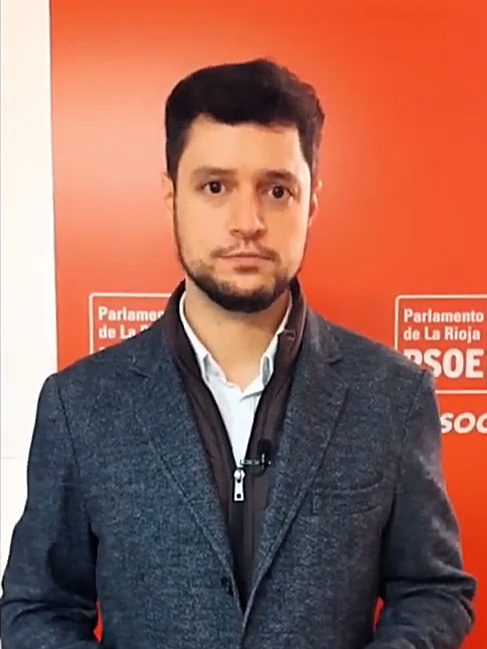

Member of the Congress of Deputies
- Incumbent
- Assumed office 17 August 2023
- Constituency: La Rioja

Member of the Senate
- In office 23 July 2019 – 10 January 2022
- Appointed by: Parliament of La Rioja

Personal details
- Born: 8 February 1988 (age 38)
- Party: Spanish Socialist Workers' Party

Raúl Díaz Marín (born 8 February 1988) is a Spanish politician serving as a member of the Congress of Deputies since 2023. From 2019 to 2022, he was a member of the Senate.
