= Jesús Salmerón =

Spanish politician

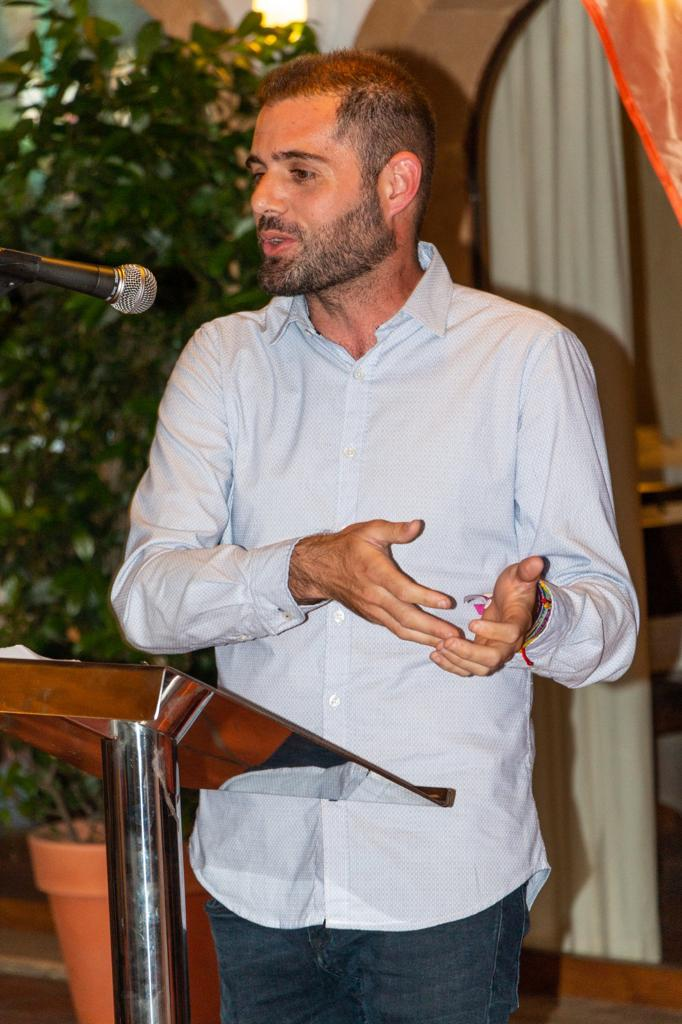
- Salmerón in 2019

Mayor of Gátova
- Incumbent
- Assumed office 17 June 2023
- Preceded by: Manuel Martínez

Member of the Corts Valencianes
- In office 16 May 2019 – 20 May 2023
- Constituency: Valencia

Personal details
- Born: 1 December 1991 (age 34) Tavernes Blanques, Spain
- Party: People's Party (2022–present)
- Other political affiliations: Citizens (until 2021)
- Spouse: Borja Martínez (m. 2026)
- Education: University of Valencia, University of Lleida
- Profession: Lawyer

Jesús Salmerón Berga (born 1 December 1991) is a Spanish politician. He was a member of the Corts Valencianes from 2019 to 2023. He left the Citizens party in 2021 and the following year joined the People's Party (PP), being elected mayor of Gátova in 2023.

== Biography ==
Salmerón was born on 1 December 1991 in Tavernes Blanques in the Province of Valencia, Spain. He graduated with a law degree from the University of Valencia, and a master's degree in the penal system from the University of Lleida. From the age of 23, he has been a lawyer in the Ilustre Colegio de Abogados de Valencia (ICAV).

Salmerón worked as an assistant for Citizens party in the Corts Valencianes. Openly gay, he worked on LGBT-related policy for the party in the Valencian Community. He ran as a candidate for the Senate of Spain in the 2016 general election.

Salmerón became the national coordinator for Citizens' youth division in 2017. He was placed fifth in the party's list in the Valencia constituency; the top seven were elected.

In May 2021, Salmerón was one of four Citizens deputies to leave the party in protest at its fall from 26 deputies to zero in the Assembly of Madrid following an electoral wipeout. In October 2022, he became the People's Party (PP) candidate for mayor of Gátova, where he had lived since 2015. He won three of seven seats on the council and formed government with the support of the one member from the Socialist Party of the Valencian Country (PSPV), ending eight years of governance by the Citizens splinter Contigo Somos Democracia; he was the town's first PP mayor. He was also the first mayor in the municipality to take a salary, €31,800. Though Gátova had only 400 inhabitants and a budget of €500,000, his salary was still 75% of the maximum permitted by the law for a municipality of under 1,000 inhabitants.

On 7 November 2026, he married PSOE politician Borja Martínez, the deputy mayor of Serra.
