= Pablo Ruz Villanueva =

Spanish politician (born 1983)

Mayor of Elche
- Incumbent
- Assumed office 17 June 2023
- Preceded by: Carlos González Serna

Member of the Senate
- In office 21 May 2019 – 29 May 2023
- Constituency: Alicante

Personal details
- Born: 15 September 1983 (age 42) Elche, Spain
- Party: People's Party

Pablo Ruz Villanueva (born 15 September 1983) is a Spanish politician serving as mayor of Elche since 2023. From 2019 to 2023, he was a member of the Senate.

Ruz was installed as mayor with support from Vox. In June 2024, posters appeared with the message "Pablo, does Aurora [Rodil, local Vox leader] know that thing about you?", in reference to his homosexuality. Ruz reported the posters as homophobic, and the case was closed in March 2025 with no crime being found.
