= Ivan Aničin =

Yugoslav-Serbian physicist and cosmologist

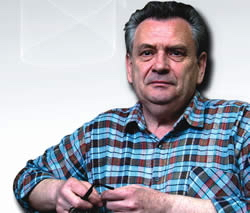
- prof. Aničin, c. 2008
- Born: 25 March 1944; Bor, Serbia, Yugoslavia
- Died: 2 April 2016 (aged 72)
- Education: University of Belgrade (B.S., Mr, Doctor of Sciences in Physics)
- Scientific career
- Fields: Physics
- Workplaces: Max Planck Institute for Physics; Institut National de Physique Nucléaire et de Physique des Particules (IN2P3); Institute of Physics; Vinča Nuclear Institute; Vinča Cyclotron; Faculty of Physics, University of Belgrade

Ivan Aničin (born 25 March 1944 in Bor, Serbia, Yugoslavia, died 2 April 2016) was a Yugoslav and Serbian nuclear physicist, particle physicist, astrophysicist, and cosmologist, university Full Professor and Distinguished (teaching/research) Professor of scientific institutes in Belgrade (Serbia), Bristol (United Kingdom), Grenoble (France), and Munich (Germany).

He has been Head of Department of Nuclear and Particle Physics at University of Belgrade and Chief of Chair of Nuclear and Particle physics at Faculty of Physics, University of Belgrade, since 1997, and Director of Doctoral Studies in Nuclear and Particle Physics at University of Belgrade. Professor Aničin was distinguished professor of both Institute of Physics Belgrade and Vinča Institute for Nuclear Sciences, where he led projects in cosmology and astroparticle physics.

Aničin was member of several international projects, including LHC CERN, ILIAS, LOREX, and projects funded by the Serbian Ministry of Science and Technology.

== Education ==
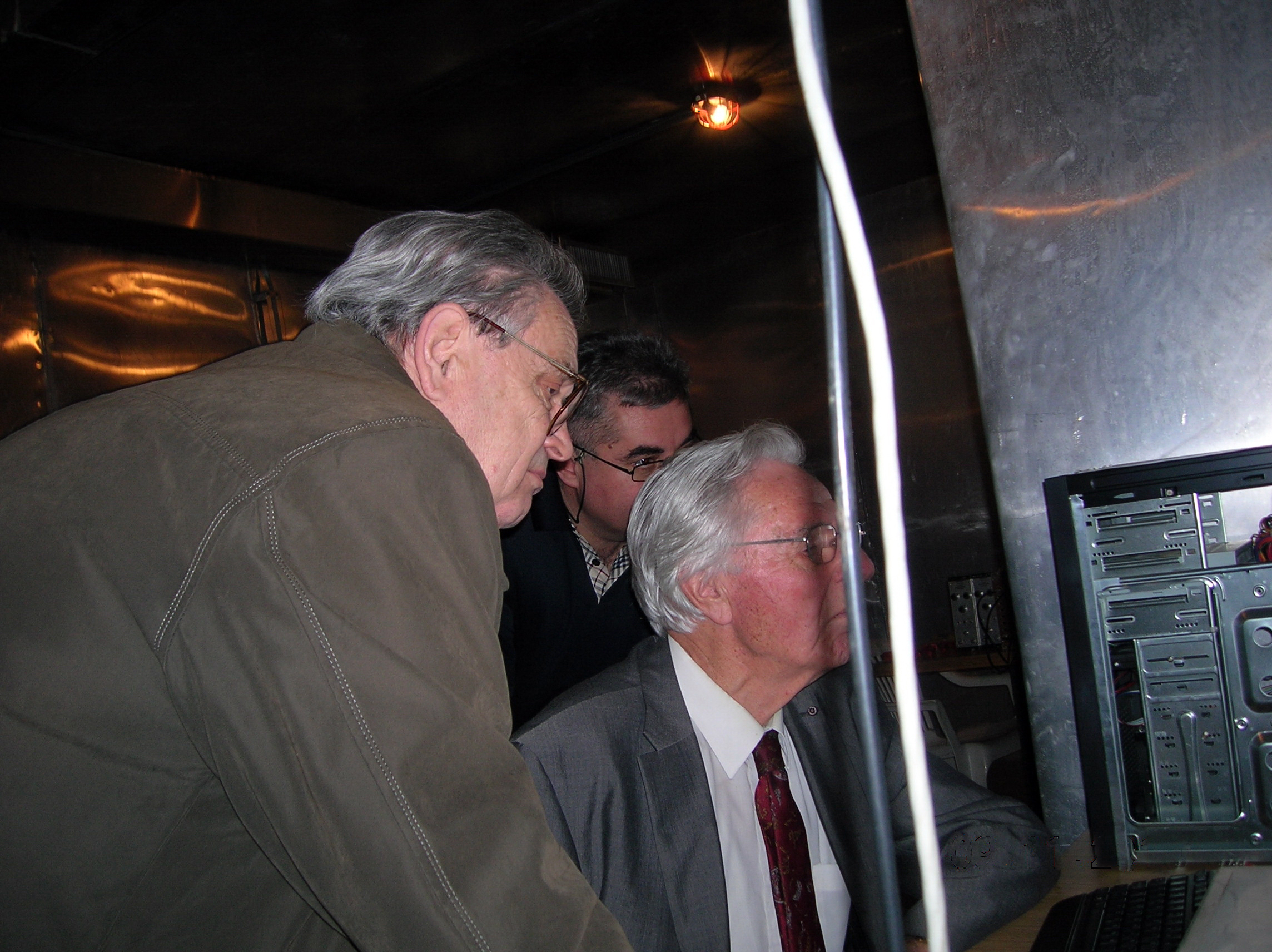
Professor Aničin with Sir Arnold Whittaker Wolfendale FRS, British astronomer who served as Astronomer Royal, and professor Jovan Puzović (CERN and Faculty of Physics, University of Belgrade).

Ivan Aničin was educated in Yugoslavia (Belgrade), United Kingdom (Bristol), France (Grenoble), and Germany (Munich).

He completed elementary school and Gymnasium education in Belgrade. At University of Belgrade he attained a First Class degree in physics in 1967, completed his Magister of Sciences in Physics or PhD degree in Physics in 1970, and Doctor of Sciences in Physics degree in 1973.

Aničin did his postdoctoral studies, research, and, for some time, teaching, in the United Kingdom at University of Bristol, in Grenoble, France, at the Institut National de Physique Nucléaire et de Physique des Particules (IN2P3) of the National Center of Scientific Research (Centre national de la recherche scientifique, or CNRS), the European Synchrotron Radiation Facility (ESRF), and the Institut Laue-Langevin, or ILL, in Munich, Germany, at Max Planck Institute for Physics, and in Yugoslavia, at the Institute for Nuclear Sciences "Boris Kidrič" (later renamed to INS "Vinča").

== Scientific career ==
Ivan Aničin earned Magister of Sciences in Physics or PhD degree in Physics in 1970, and Doctor of Sciences in Physics degree in 1973., in the field of nuclear physics. His interests and research are in the fields of nuclear spectroscopy of gamma radiation and conversion electrons and their angle correlations, studies of rare and low probability nuclear and fundamental processes (especially neutrinoless double beta decay, non-resonant excitations), detection of solar neutrinos, detection of dark matter, measurements of cosmic radiation, and methodology of experimental nuclear physics in general.

== Teaching career ==
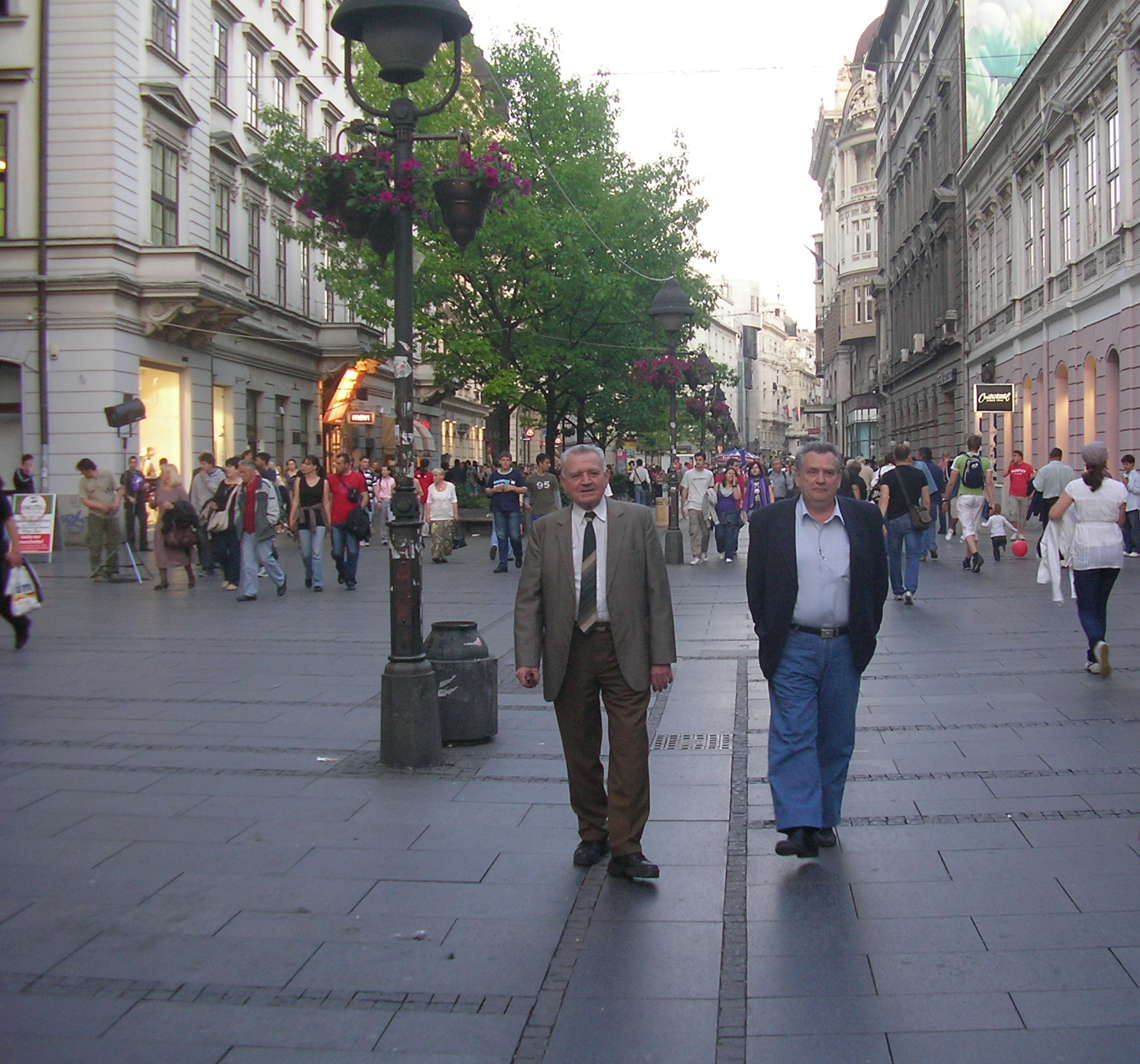
Ivan Aničin with his student-days professor of Nuclear Physics and a colleague from Institute for Nuclear Sciences Vinča and Faculty of Physics University of Belgrade, Đuro Krmpotić, during a filming on formerly top-secret nuclear projects in Socialist Federative Republic of Yugoslavia.

During and after holding post-doctoral research positions in the United Kingdom, France, Germany, and Yugoslavia, Aničin mostly taught at Belgrade University and the University of Novi Sad, at the Institute for Nuclear Sciences "Boris Kidrič" (later renamed to INS "Vinča")), and Institute of Physics Zemun (renamed to "Institute of Physics Belgrade").

Aničin started his teaching career at 1969, as assistant professor for Nuclear Physics and for General Courses in Physics, at University of Novi Sad. He also taught two more subjects at University of Novi Sad: Methods of Measurements, and Data Treatment.

At University of Belgrade, professor Aničin teaches or had taught the following subjects: Data Treatment in Physics, Order of Magnitude Physics, various courses of Nuclear Physics, Nuclear and Elementary Particle Physics, Foundations of Nuclear and Particle Physics, Higher Course in Nuclear Physics, Nuclear Instrumentation, Nuclear Spectroscopy, Selected Chapters of High Energy Physics, Detectors, Nondestructive Analysis, Rare Subatomic Processes, Astroparticle Physics, Radiation Physics.

From 1990 Aničin teaches History of Physics and Philosophy of Physics at postgraduate Center for Multidisciplinary Studies at University of Belgrade. From 1980 Aničin teaches specialized courses in "School of Isotopes" in the Institute for Nuclear Sciences "Vinča"). In Belgrade Aničin also taught general courses in physics at the Faculty for Teachers (Pedagogical Academy).

Professor Aničin is a frequent lecturer at Kolarac Institute, where he gives public lectures for a broader (non-physicists) audience.

Professor Aničin is author and lecturer of courses "How to teach physics – order of magnitude physics", "How to teach physics – nuclear and particle physics", and "How to teach physics – astrophysics and cosmology", at University of Belgrade, aimed at college, high school, and elementary school professors and teachers, who need to advance their knowledge both in named fields on physics and in methodology and didactics, and at scientists and engineers at physics teaching positions. The courses are part of broader Master of Science level at Faculty of Physics, University of Belgrade. These MSc courses are for teachers, professors, engineers, and graduated physicists only. They are part of postgraduate education scheme "Physics and Engineering Education for Graduated Physicists, Graduated Engineers, College Teachers, and Professors" academic discipline "MSc in Physics and Engineering" with professional title "Professor of Physics, Science, Informatics, and Engineering – Master", awarded jointly by Faculty of Physics and University of Belgrade. This diploma allows its holders to teach in any of the following subject areas, at college, high school, or elementary school level: physics, science, informatics and related subjects (e.g. computer programming languages), engineering, and mathematics.

Professor Aničin mentored or was member of degree granting committee of more than 200 MSc, PhD, and Doctor of Sciences in Physics degrees to American, British, Croatian, French, German, Greek, Iraqi, Iranian, Libyan, Montenegrin, Russian, Serbian, Slovenian, Soviet, and Yugoslavian physicists. He also mentored MSc and Doctor of Sciences in Physics degrees of his colleagues and successors at Faculty of Physics of University of Belgrade: professors Jovan Puzović (at CERN from 2000), and professor Goran Škoro (from 2004 on leave at UK Neutrino Factory).

== Petnica Scientific Center engagement ==
Ivan Aničin was President of Scientific Committee of Youth International Scientific Conference, "A Step into Science", organized by famous Petnica Science Center, and a contributor and patron of Petnica Science Center, PSC.

== Bibliography ==
=== Textbooks ===
Aničin is author or co-author of 19 textbooks and collections of worked problems in physics, for all levels of education (primary, secondary, tertiary): The rest of the published textbooks are university textbooks in Nuclear Physics, Elementary Particle Physics, Astro-particle Physics and Cosmology, Order of Magnitude Physics and Data Treatment in Physics.

=== Articles ===
Aničin was a regular contributor to science journals and popular science magazines. He published more than 200 papers and presentations for international and Yugoslav congresses and symposiums.

=== Selected scientific works ===
1. LBikit, J.Slivka, I.Aničin, L.Marinkov, A.Rudić and W.D.Hamilton:"Photoactivation of ^{111}Cd^{m} without a nonresonant contribution", PhysRev. C35(1987)386
2. GP.Škoro, I.V.Aničin, AJLKukoč, Dj.M.Krmpotić, P.RAdžić, R.B.Vukanović and M.T.Župančić: "Environmental Neutrons as seen by a Germanium Gamma-Ray Spectrometer", Nucl.Instr. and Meth., A316(1992)333
3. I.V.Aničin, R.B.Vukanović and A.H.Kukoč:"The New Feature of 1–3 Directional Correlations with Mixed Unobserved Transitions", Nuclear Instr. and Meth. 103(1972)395
4. LBikit, M.Krmar, J.Slivka, I.Aničin, M.Vesković, Lj.Čonkić: "Electron-positron conversion decay of ^{64}Zn", ApplRadialsot. 46(1995)455–456
5. J.Puzović and I.Aničin'User friendly Monte-Carlo program for the generation of gamma-ray spectral responses in complex source-detector arrangements' Nuclear Instr. and Meth., A414 (1998) 29–282
