= San Pelayo, Valladolid =

Municipality in Valladolid, Spain

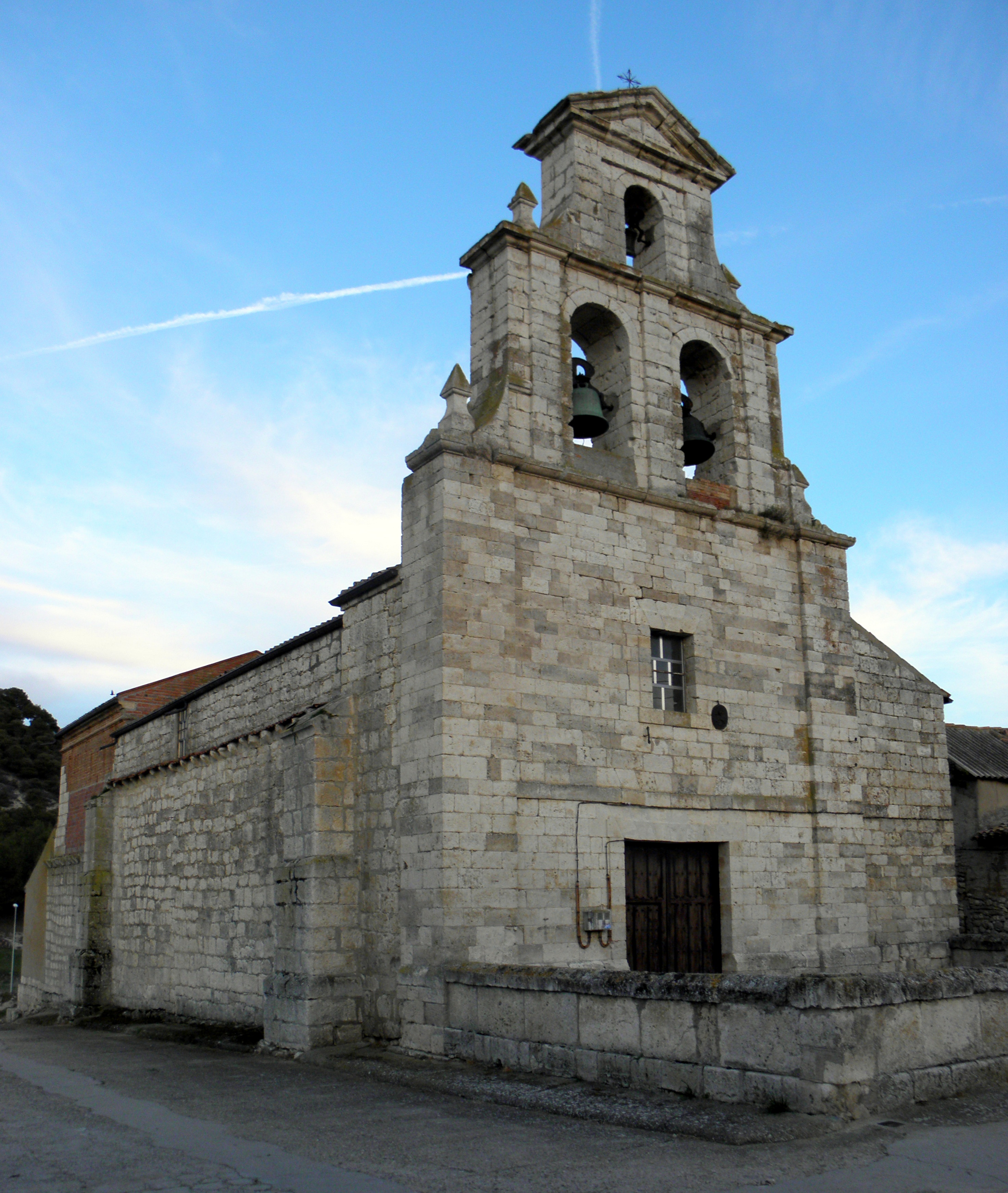
The church of the Ascension

Flag of San Pelayo, Valladolid

Coat of arms of San Pelayo, Valladolid

San Pelayo is a municipality in the Province of Valladolid, Spain. Population: 54 (based on the data from 2017) Post code: 47129

The Cuatro Gatos Festival against Depopulation proposed to use music, culture, and activism to stop depopulation.
