= Esporles =

Esporles Esporlas
- Coat of arms

- Map of Esplores in Mallorca

- Location in Spain Esporles (Balearic Islands) Esporles (Spain)
- Coordinates: 39°39′58″N 2°34′48″E
- Country: Spain
- Autonomous community: Balearic Islands
- Province: Balearic Islands
- Comarca: Sierra de Tramontana
- Judicial district: Manacor

Government
  - Mayor: Miquel Ensenyat Riutort

Area
  - Total: 35.29 km^{2} (13.63 sq mi)
- Elevation: 198 m (650 ft)

Population (2025-01-01)
  - Total: 5,264
  - Density: 149.2/km^{2} (386.3/sq mi)
- Demonym: Esporlerí
- Website: Official website

Esporles (Balearic Catalan: [əsˈpoɾləs]) is a municipality in Mallorca in the Balearic Islands, Spain. Situated around the zone of the Serra de Tramuntana, it is located approximately 15 kilometres (9 mi) from Palma de Mallorca. The town is divided into Vilavella and Vilanova. It also includes small developments, such as Ses Rotgetes de Canet y Es Verger.

Its economy was traditionally based on agriculture and animal husbandry, which is displayed at the rural estate museum La Granja. Tourism, like in most of the Balearic Islands, is now the base of its economy. The textile industry was historically very important economically, but in the present day, only traces of the factories remain. Some to this day remain empty but most have been transformed into housing. One of the biggest factories was turned into the local library Sa Fabrica, which opened in 2010.

== Administration ==
=== Constitutional mayors (2015–1979) ===
Legislature	Mayor's name	Political party
2015–	Maria Ramon Salas	MÉS-APIB
2011–2015	Miquel Ensenyat	PSM
2007–2011	Miquel Ensenyat	PSM
2005–2007	Miquel Ensenyat	PSM
1999–2005	Jaume Pou Reines	PP
1996–1999	Jaume Pou Reines	PP
1995–1996	Pere Trias Auli	PSM
1991–1995	Guillermo Bosch	PSOE
1987–1991	Vicenç Matas	PSOE
1983–1987	Vicenç Matas	PSOE
1979–1983	Bartolome Bosch	Independent

== Monuments ==
- Parochial church of Sant Pere
- Cor de Jesús
- Ermita de Maristella
- Parochial church of Esgleieta
- La Granja
- Son Tugores
- Canet

== Culture ==
- Public school Gabriel Comas i Ribes
- Public institute Josep Font i Tries

== Sports ==
- Football pitch in Son Quint (home of the local team C. E. Esporles).
- Municipal pavilion for Basketball
- Tennis court in Son Quint (Currently abandoned and not maintained)
- Indoor Volleyball in Colegio Gabriel Comas i Ribas
- Rhythmic gymnastics in Colegio Gabriel Comas i Ribas
- Public open roof Swimming pool (only open in summer and spring)

== Festivities ==
- Festes de Sant Pere (23 to 30 June) is one of the most important celebrations. The popular correfoc, which has been a part of local events since the late 20th century and early 21st century, is not typical of any town in the Balearic Islands. Its origins go back to the ancient Ball de Diables ('the Dance of Devils'), whose first dated written records are from 12th-century Tarragona.
- La Fira Dolça ('the Sweet Fair') is held on the first Sunday of October. Confections are the focus of the fair, held in Esporles since 2005. Traditional products like crespells, a biscuit of Jewish origin which today is made in the shape of stars, flowers or circles, and other, more modern products, like cupcakes are presented. The festival also features craft stalls, expositions, contests, baking workshops for children, an area dedicated to embroidery and an area for craft beer.
