= Albalate de Zorita =

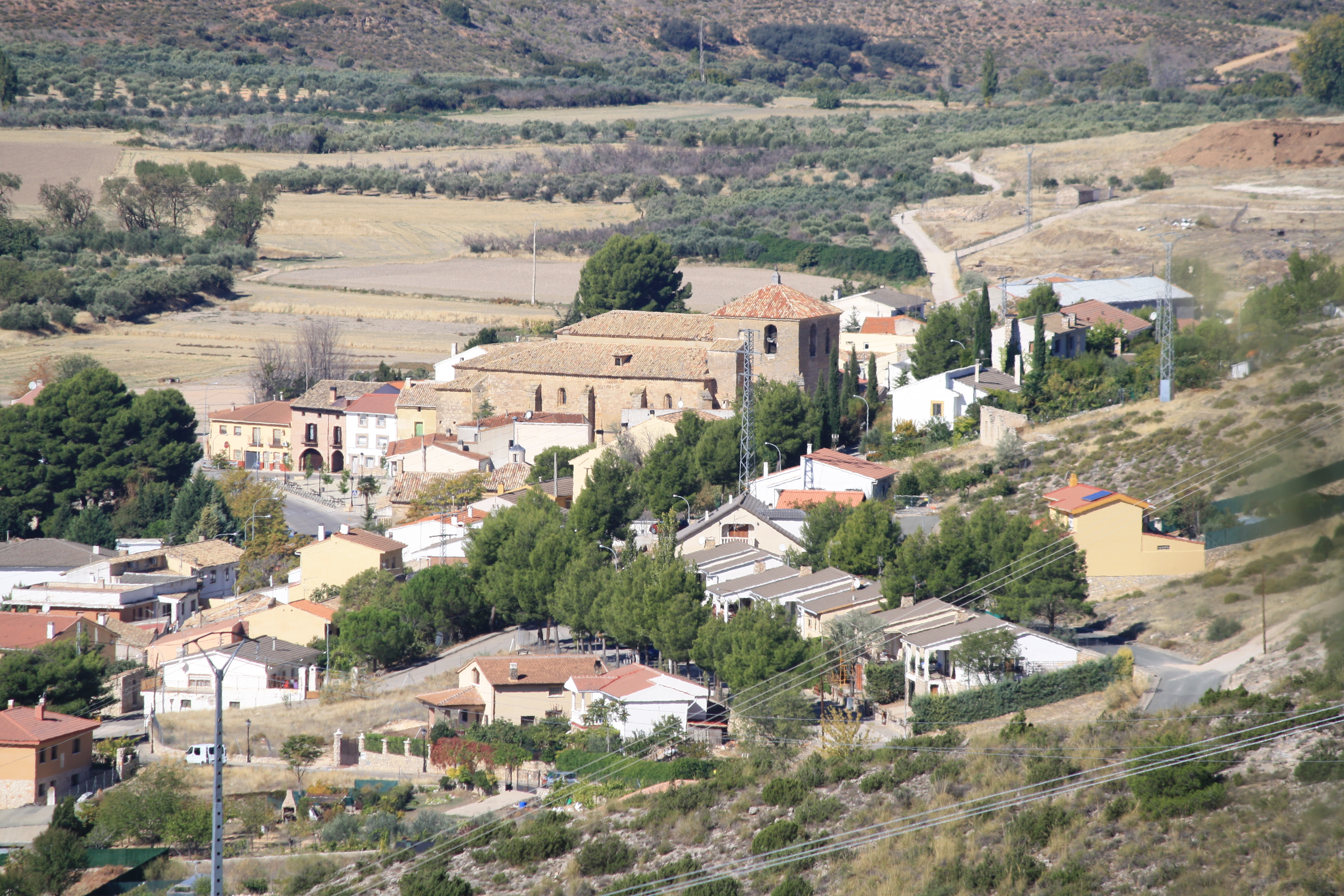

- Coat of arms

- Location within Province of Guadalajara Location within Castilla-La Mancha Location within Spain
- Coordinates: 40°18′32″N 2°50′31″W
- Country: Spain
- Autonomous community: Castile-La Mancha
- Province: Guadalajara
- Municipality: Albalate de Zorita

Government
  - Mayor: Alberto Merchante Ballesteros (Spanish Socialist Workers' Party)

Area
  - Total: 53 km^{2} (20 sq mi)
- Elevation: 759 m (2,490 ft)

Population (2025-01-01)
  - Total: 1,148
  - Density: 22/km^{2} (56/sq mi)
- Time zone: UTC+1 (CET)
  - Summer (DST): UTC+2 (CEST)
- Website: www.albalatedezorita.es

Albalate de Zorita is a municipality located in the province of Guadalajara, Castile-La Mancha, Spain. According to the 2015 census (INE), the municipality has a population of 1022 inhabitants.

== History ==
Albalate is named as a village since the 11th century, while the Muslim occupation of Spain, then, after the Reconquest, it figures in the Diaries of Philip II, in the 17th century. During the Spanish Civil War it was in the Republican side of Spain, and after the war, many inhabitants were killed.

=== Traditions ===
The main festival is in honor of the Holy Cross, or Cruz del Perro, which is a cross that dates back to the 13th century, discovered by two farmers in a near place near the village, on September, 27th, 1514, since then, it is the patron of the village. For the festival, they have bullfighting, fireworks, two parades (one the Sunday before 27 September, which is a pilgrimage to where it was discovered, and another one, one or two days before the day) and also the religious celebrations, a mass, and a procession with the image. Another festival is for Saint Blaise, on February, 3rd, in which many inhabitants dress up in red and yellow clothes and dance around the image of the saint during a 3-4 hour procession.

In 1 May, a song called Mayos de la Virgen is sung by the ones who are 18 years old that year.

=== Monuments ===
The main monuments are the St Andreas' Church, a Gothic Church built in the 16th century, it is Gothic style, in hall type plan, with a Baroque altarpiece made by Juan Alonso Pedroso in 1701–1707. Also the Thirteen Pipe Fountain, from the 17th century, it is near the side street of the village.

== Politics ==
The Village is governed since 2015 by the Socialist Party of Spain (PSOE) with 5 counsellors out of 9, the mayor is Alberto Merchante Ballesteros since 18 November 2016, when the previous mayor, Dolores Ortega, resigned to the office. Albalate has been governed by the PSOE since 2003 elections.
