= Valjevo Gymnasium =

Coordinates: 44.2698°N 19.886°E

- Ваљевска гимназија Valjevska gimnazija
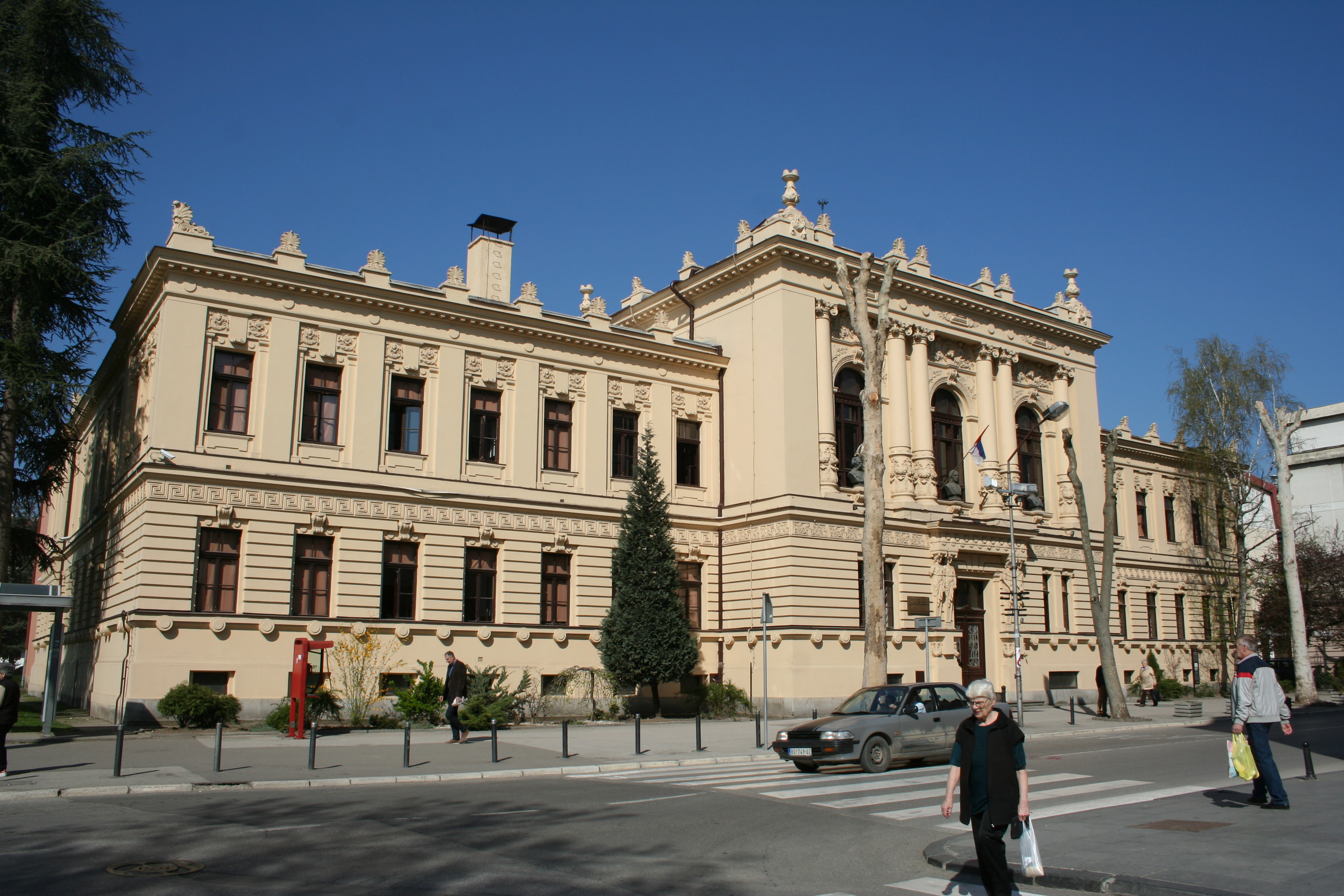
- Vuka Karadzica 3; 14000 Valjevo; Serbia

Information
- Principal: Pavle Delija
- Faculty: 62
- Enrollment: 760
- Website: http://www.valjevskagimnazija.edu.rs

Valjevo Gymnasium (Serbian: Ваљевска гимназија, romanized: Valjevska gimnazija) is a high school located in Valjevo, Serbia. It is also known as Valjevo High School.

== History ==
Valijevo Gymnasium was founded in 1870. For the first two years, it had only two grades. It’s had seven grades since 1907.

Today, about 760 students attend the institution.

== Timeline ==
Timeline of important years in Valjevo Gymnasium’s history:

- 1870 – founded
- 1874 – added 3rd grade
- 1875 – added 4th grade
- 1893 – added 5th grade
- 1894 – added 6th grade
- 1898 – 5th and 6th grades ceased to exist
- 1903 – 5th grade operating again
- 1904 – 6th grade introduced
- 1907 – 7th grade introduced
- 1913 – Valjevo Gymnasium becomes fully eight grades school
- 1914 – Introduces 1st secondary education exam, then The World War I started and Gymnasium worked only in 1918
- 1940 – Split into First and Second Gymnasium
- 1942 – During World War II First Gymnasium became Boys' Gymnasium and Second Gymnasium became Girls' Gymnasium
- 1952 – High Gymnasium was introduced taking middle education grades from both First and Second Gymnasium, and those two had merged into one Gymnasium again
- 1966 – Moving back to the original building
- 1970 – Celebrating one century since founding
- 1989 – Teaching staff agreed to call the school Valjevo Gymnasium since it carried the name of Lenin from 1970

== Notable Students and Faculty ==
- Vladimir Pecikoza (1977-present), archaeologist, former student at Valijevo Gymnasium
