= List of members of the 15th Congress of Deputies =

The following is a list of members of the 15th Congress of Deputies as elected in the 2023 Spanish general election.

== Composition ==
Parliamentary group	List	Seats	Parliamentary group	List	Seats
Popular	PP: 137	137	Junts per Catalunya	JxCat: 7	7
Socialista	PSOE: 88; PSC: 19; PSdeG-PSOE: 7; PSE-EE-PSOE: 5	119	Euskal Herria Bildu	EH Bildu: 6	6
Vox	Vox: 33	33	Vasco (EAJ-PNV)	PNV: 5	5
Plurinacional Sumar	Movimiento Sumar: 11; IU: 5; CatComú: 5; Más País: 2; Compromís: 2; Chunta: 1; Més: 1	27	Mixed	PSOE: 1 Sumar-En Comú Podem: 4 BNG: 1 UPN: 1 CCa: 1	8
Republicano	ERC: 7	7	Mixed	PSOE: 1 Sumar-En Comú Podem: 4 BNG: 1 UPN: 1 CCa: 1	8

They are listed in alphabetical order, specifying their parliamentary group, electoral list, and constituency for which they are members, as well as their date of appointment. In the case of members who have left office, the information is specified as in the table above, adding the date of resignation and the person who replaced them.

== List ==
Name	Parliamentary group	Party list	Constituency	Start	End
Abades Martínez, Cristina	PP	PP	Lugo	August 17, 2023	
Ábalos Meco, José Luis	PSOE	PSOE	Valencia	August 17, 2023	
Abascal Conde, Santiago	Vox	Vox	Madrid	August 17, 2023	
Acedo Reyes, Sofía	PP	PP	Melilla	August 17, 2023	
Aceves Galindo, José Luis	PSOE	PSOE	Segovia	August 17, 2023	
Adrio Taracido, María	PSOE	PSdeG-PSOE	Pontevedra	August 17, 2023	
Agirretxea Urresti, Joseba Andoni	PNV	PNV	Gipuzkoa	August 17, 2023	
Agüera Gago, Cristina	PP	PP	Barcelona	August 17, 2023	
Aizcorbe Torra, Juan José	Vox	Vox	Barcelona	August 17, 2023	
Aizpurua Arzallus, Mertxe	Euskal Herria Bildu	EH Bildu	Gipuzkoa	August 17, 2023	
Albares Bueno, José Manuel	PSOE	PSOE	Madrid	August 17, 2023	
Alcaraz Martos, Francisco José	Vox	Vox	Jaén	August 17, 2023	
Alegría Continente, María Pilar	PSOE	PSOE	Zaragoza	August 17, 2023	
Alfonso Cendón, Javier	PSOE	PSOE	León	August 17, 2023	
Alfonso Silvestre, Alma	PP	PP	Valencia	August 17, 2023	
Alía Aguado, María Pilar	PP	PP	Toledo	August 17, 2023	
Alonso Cantorné, Fèlix	Sumar	IU	Tarragona	August 17, 2023	
Alós López, Ana Isabel	PP	PP	Huesca	August 17, 2023	
Álvarez de Toledo Peralta-Ramos, Cayetana	PP	PP	Madrid	August 17, 2023	
Álvarez Fanjul, Beatriz	PP	PP	Biscay	August 17, 2023	
Álvarez González, Alicia	PSOE	PSOE	Santa Cruz de Tenerife	August 17, 2023	
Álvaro, Francesc-Marc	ERC	ERC	Barcelona	August 17, 2023	
Andala Ubbi, Teslem	Sumar	MP	Madrid	August 17, 2023	
Andrés Añón, Carmen	PSOE	PSOE	Barcelona	August 17, 2023	
Antona Gómez, Asier	PP	PP	Santa Cruz de Tenerife	August 17, 2023	
Aragonés Mendiguchía, Carlos	PP	PP	Madrid	August 17, 2023	
Aranda Vargas, Francisco	PSOE	PSC	Barcelona	August 17, 2023	
Argota Castro, Trinidad Carmen	PSOE	PSOE	Sevilla	August 17, 2023	
Argüelles García, Silverio	PP	PP	Asturias	August 17, 2023	
Armario González, Blanca	Vox	Vox	Cádiz	August 17, 2023	
Armengol Socias, Francina	PSOE	PSOE	Balearic Islands	August 17, 2023	
Arribas Maroto, Manuel	PSOE	PSOE	Ávila	August 17, 2023	
Asarta Cuevas, Alberto	Vox	Vox	Castellón	August 17, 2023	
Azorín Salar, Lázaro	PSOE	PSOE	Alicante	August 17, 2023	
Badia Casas, Eloi	Sumar	CatComú	Barcelona	August 17, 2023	
Bassa Coll, Montserrat	ERC	ERC	Girona	August 17, 2023	
Batet Lamaña, Meritxell	PSOE	PSOE	Barcelona	August 17, 2023	
Beamonte Mesa, Luis María	PP	PP	Zaragoza	August 17, 2023	
Belarra Urteaga, Ione	Podemos	Podemos	Madrid	August 17, 2023	
Belda Pérez-Pedrero, Enrique	PP	PP	Ciudad Real	August 17, 2023	
Belmonte Gómez, Rafael Benigno	PP	PP	Seville	August 17, 2023	
Bendodo Benasayag, Elías	PP	PP	Málaga	August 17, 2023	
Bermúdez de Castro Fernández, José Antonio	PP	PP	Salamanca	August 17, 2023	
Blanquer Alcaraz, Patricia	PSOE	PSOE	Alicante	August 17, 2023	
Boada Danés, Júlia	Sumar	CatComú	Girona	August 17, 2023	
Bolaños García, Félix	PSOE	PSOE	Madrid	August 17, 2023	
Borrego Cortés, Isabel María	PP	PP	Murcia	August 17, 2023	
Bravo Baena, Juan	PP	PP	Seville	August 17, 2023	
Cabezón Casas, Tomás	PP	PP	Soria	August 17, 2023	
Pilar Calvo Gómez	Junts	JuntsxCat	Barcelona	August 17, 2023	
Calvo Poyato, Carmen	PSOE	PSOE	Granada	August 17, 2023	
Campos Asensi, Jorge	Vox	Vox	Balearic Islands	August 17, 2023	
Cantalapiedra Álvarez, María de las Mercedes	PP	PP	Valladolid	August 17, 2023	
Carazo Hermoso, Eduardo	PP	PP	Valladolid	August 17, 2023	
Carballedo Berlanga, María Eugenia	PP	PP	Madrid	August 17, 2023	
Casares Hontañón, Pedro	PSOE	PSOE	Cantabria	August 17, 2023	
Castilla Álvarez, María Carmen	PSOE	PSOE	Seville	August 17, 2023	
Catalán Higueras, Alberto	Mixed	UPN	Navarre	August 17, 2023	
Antonio Cavacasillas Rodríguez, Antonio	PP	PP	Badajoz	August 17, 2023	
Celaya Brey, Javier	PP	PP	Ceuta	August 17, 2023	
Cercas Mena, Blanca	PSOE	PSC	Girona	August 17, 2023	
Cerdán León, Santos	PSOE	PSOE	Navarre	August 17, 2023	
Cervera Pinart, Josep María	Junts	JuntsxCat	Girona	August 17, 2023	
Chamorro Delmo, Ricardo	Vox	Vox	Ciudad Real	August 17, 2023	
Clavell López, Óscar	PP	PP	Castellón	August 17, 2023	
Clemente Muñoz, Raquel	PP	PP	Teruel	August 17, 2023	
Cobo Carmona, Ana	PSOE	PSOE	Jaén	August 17, 2023	
Cobo Pérez, Noelia	PSOE	PSOE	Cantabria	August 17, 2023	
Cobo Vega, Manuel	PP	PP	Madrid	August 17, 2023	
Cofiño Fernández, Rafael	Sumar	Sumar	Asturias	August 17, 2023	
Conde Bajén, Agustín	PP	PP	Toledo	August 17, 2023	
Conde López, Francisco José	PP	PP	Lugo	August 17, 2023	
Cortés Carballo, Mario	PP	PP	Málaga	August 17, 2023	
Corujo Berriel, María Dolores	PSOE	PSOE	Las Palmas	August 17, 2023	
Crespín Rubio, Rafaela	PSOE	PSOE	Córdoba	August 17, 2023	
Cruset Domènech, Josep María	Junts	JuntsxCat	Tarragona	August 17, 2023	
Cruz Santana, Gabriel	PSOE	PSOE	Huelva	August 17, 2023	
Cruz-Guzmán García, María Soledad	PP	PP	Seville	August 17, 2023	
Cuesta Rodríguez, María del Socorro	PP	PP	Segovia	August 17, 2023	
De Andrés Guerra, Javier	PP	PP	Álava	August 17, 2023	
De las Cuevas Cortés, Félix	PP	PP	Cantabria	August 17, 2023	
De los Santos González, Jaime Miguel	PP	PP	Madrid	August 17, 2023	
De Luna Tobarra, Llanos	PP	PP	Barcelona	August 17, 2023	
De Meer Méndez, Rocío	Vox	Vox	Almería	August 17, 2023	
De Rosa Torner, Fernando	PP	PP	Valencia	August 17, 2023	
Del Moral Leal, María Luisa	PP	PP	Jaén	August 17, 2023	
Del Valle Rodríguez, Emilio Jesús	Vox	Vox	Cantabria	August 17, 2023	
Delgado Arce, Celso Luis	PP	PP	Ourense	August 17, 2023	
Delgado-Taramona Hernández, Jimena	PP	PP	Las Palmas	August 17, 2023	
Díaz Marín, Raúl	PSOE	PSOE	La Rioja	August 17, 2023	
Díaz Pérez, Yolanda	Sumar	Sumar	Madrid	August 17, 2023	
Diouf Dioh, Luc Andre	PSOE	PSOE	Las Palmas	August 17, 2023	
Errejón Galván, Íñigo	Sumar	Más País	Madrid	August 17, 2023	
Esteban Bravo, Aitor	PNV	PNV	Biscay	August 17, 2023	
Fabra Part, Alberto	PP	PP	Castellón	August 17, 2023	
Fagúndez Campo, Antidio	PSOE	PSOE	Zamora	August 17, 2023	
Faneca López, María Luisa	PSOE	PSOE	Huelva	August 17, 2023	
Fernández Benéitez, Andrea	PSOE	PSOE	León	August 17, 2023	
Fernández González, María Mercedes	PP	PP	Asturias	August 17, 2023	
Fernández Hernández, Pedro	Vox	Vox	Zaragoza	August 17, 2023	
Fernández Herranz, Sandra	PP	PP	Balearic Islands	August 17, 2023	
Fernández Ríos, Tomás	Vox	Vox	Huelva	August 17, 2023	
Figaredo Álvarez-Sala, José María	Vox	Vox	Asturias	August 17, 2023	
Flores Juberías, Carlos	Vox	Vox	Valencia	August 17, 2023	
Floriano Corrales, Carlos Javier	PP	PP	Cáceres	August 17, 2023	
Folch Blanc, Javier José	PP	PP	Huesca	August 17, 2023	
Franco González, Silvia	PP	PP	León	August 17, 2023	
Fullaondo la Cruz, Marije	Euskal Herria Bildu	EH Bildu	Biscay	August 17, 2023	
Fúnez de Gregorio, Carmen	PP	PP	Ciudad Real	August 17, 2023	
Gallardo Barrena, Pedro Ignacio	PP	PP	Cádiz	August 17, 2023	
Gamarra Ruiz-Clavijo, Concepción	PP	PP	La Rioja	August 17, 2023	
García Adanero, Carlos	PP	PP	Madrid	August 17, 2023	
García Bernal, Begoña	PSOE	PSOE	Cáceres	August 17, 2023	
García Félix, Manuel	PP	PP	Huelva	August 17, 2023	
García Gomis, David	Vox	Vox	Alicante	August 17, 2023	
García Gurrutxaga, María Luisa	PSOE	PSOE	Gipuzkoa	August 17, 2023	
García López, Maribel	PSOE	PSOE	Badajoz	August 17, 2023	
García Morís, Roberto	PSOE	PSOE	Asturias	August 17, 2023	
Garre Murcia, Cristóbal	PP	PP	Málaga	August 17, 2023	
Garrido Jiménez, Elisa	PSOE	PSOE	La Rioja	August 17, 2023	
Garrido Valenzuela, Irene	PP	PP	Pontevedra	August 17, 2023	
Gavin i Valls, Isidre	Junts	JuntsxCat	Lleida	August 17, 2023	
Gil de Reboleño Lastortres, Esther	Sumar	Sumar	Cádiz	August 17, 2023	
Gil Lázaro, Ignacio	Vox	Vox	Valencia	August 17, 2023	
Gil Santiago, Carlos	PP	PP	Valencia	August 17, 2023	
Gómez Besteiro, José Ramón	PSOE	PSdeG-PSOE	Lugo	August 17, 2023	
Gómez Hernández, Héctor	PSOE	PSOE	Santa Cruz de Tenerife	August 17, 2023	
González Bella, María del Mar	PP	PP	Zaragoza	August 17, 2023	
González Fernández, Mercedes	PSOE	PSOE	Madrid	August 17, 2023	
González Gracia, Juan Antonio	PSOE	PSOE	Badajoz	August 17, 2023	
González López, Nahuel	Sumar	IU	Valencia	August 17, 2023	
González Pons, Esteban	PP	PP	Valencia	August 17, 2023	
González Vázquez, Marta	PP	PP	A Coruña	August 17, 2023	
González-Robatto Perote, Jacobo	Vox	Vox	Granada	August 17, 2023	
Grande-Marlaska Gómez, Fernando	PSOE	PSOE	Cádiz	August 17, 2023	
Granollers Cunillera, Inés	ERC	ERC	Lleida	August 17, 2023	
Guerra López, Sonia	PSOE	PSOE	Barcelona	August 17, 2023	
Guijarro Ceballos, María	PSOE	PSE-EE-PSOE	Biscay	August 17, 2023	
Guijarro García, Txema	Sumar	Sumar	Alicante	August 17, 2023	
Guinart Moreno, Lídia	PSOE	PSC	Barcelona	August 17, 2023	
Gutiérrez Prieto, Sergio	PSOE	PSOE	Toledo	August 17, 2023	
Hernández Quero, Carlos	Vox	Vox	Málaga	August 17, 2023	
Hernando Fraile, Rafael Antonio	PP	PP	Almería	August 17, 2023	
Hernando Vera, Antonio	PP	PP	Almería	August 17, 2023	
Herrera García, Milena	PSOE	PSOE	Balearic Islands	August 17, 2023	
Herrero Bono, José Alberto	PP	PP	Teruel	August 17, 2023	
Hispán Iglesias de Ussel, Pablof	PP	PP	Granada	August 17, 2023	
Hoces Íñiguez, Ignacio	Vox	Vox	Badajoz	August 17, 2023	
Hoyo Juliá, Belén	PP	PP	Valencia	August 17, 2023	
Huguet Tous, Pedro Luis	PP	PP	Tarragona	August 17, 2023	
Ibáñez Hernando, Ángel	PP	PP	Burgos	August 17, 2023	
Ibáñez Mezquita, Alberto	Sumar	IPV	Valencia	August 17, 2023	
Iceta i Llorens, Miquel	PSOE	PSOE	Barcelona	August 17, 2023	
Iniesta Belén Egido, Isabel	PSOE	PSOE	Albacete	August 17, 2023	
Iñarritu García, Jon	Euskal Herria Bildu	EH Bildu	Gipuzkoa	August 17, 2023	
Jerez Antequera, Juan Carlos	PSOE	PSC	Barcelona	August 17, 2023	
Jiménez Linuesa, Beatriz	PP	PP	Cuenca	August 17, 2023	
Jordà i Roura, Teresa	ERC	ERC	Barcelona	August 17, 2023	
Lamuà Estañol, Marc	PSOE	PSC	Girona	August 17, 2023	
Lastra Fernández, Adriana	PSOE	PSOE	Asturias	August 17, 2023	
Leal Fernández, Isaura	PSOE	PSOE	Madrid	August 17, 2023	
Legarda Uriarte, Mikel	PNV	PNV	Álava	August 17, 2023	
Lima García, Laura María	PP	PP	Santa Cruz de Tenerife	August 17, 2023	
Llamazares Domingo, Esther	PP	PP	Asturias	August 17, 2023	
Llorens Carbonell, Teresa	PSOE	PSC	Barcelona	August 17, 2023	
Lois González, Marta	Sumar	Sumar	A Coruña	August 17, 2023	
López Águeda, Óscar	PSOE	PSOE	Madrid	August 17, 2023	
López Álvarez, Patxi	PSOE	PSE-EE-PSOE	Biscay	August 17, 2023	
López Cano, Ignacio	PSOE	PSOE	Málaga	August 17, 2023	
López Maraver, Ángel	Vox	Vox	Guadalajara	August 17, 2023	
Lorente Anaya, Macarena	PP	PP	Cádiz	August 17, 2023	
Lucas Ayala, Francisco	PSOE	PSOE	Murcia	August 17, 2023	
Macías Gata, Alfonso Carlos	PP	PP	Badajoz	August 17, 2023	
Madrenas i Mir, Marta	Junts	JuntsxCat	Girona	August 17, 2023	
Madrid Olmo, Bartolomé	PP	PP	Córdoba	August 17, 2023	
Maldonado López, Adriana	PSOE	PSOE	Navarre	August 17, 2023	
Marcos Ortega, Milagros	PP	PP	Palencia	August 17, 2023	
Marí Bosó, José Vicente	PP	PP	Balearic Islands	August 17, 2023	
Marín González, Luis Alberto	PP	PP	Murcia	August 17, 2023	
Mariscal Anaya, Guillermo	PP	PP	Las Palmas	August 17, 2023	
Mariscal Zabala, Manuel	Vox	Vox	Toledo	August 17, 2023	
Marqués Atés, Amador	PSOE	PSC	Lleida	August 17, 2023	
Martín Blanco, Nacho	PP	PP	Barcelona	August 17, 2023	
Martín García, Pedro Samuel	PP	PP	Salamanca	August 17, 2023	
Martín Martínez, Andreu	PSOE	PSC	Tarragona	August 17, 2023	
Martín Rodríguez, Margarita	PSOE	PSdeG-PSOE	Ourense	August 17, 2023	
Martín Urriza, Carlos	Sumar	Sumar	Madrid	August 17, 2023	
Martínez Barbero, Verónica	Sumar	Sumar	Pontevedra	August 17, 2023	
Martínez Gómez, Antonio	PP	PP	Albacete	August 17, 2023	
Martínez Hierro, Lander	Sumar	Sumar	Biscay	August 17, 2023	
Martínez Labella, Ana	PP	PP	Almería	August 17, 2023	
Martínez Ramírez, Carmen	PSOE	PSOE	Valencia	August 17, 2023	
Martínez Salmerón, Joaquín	PSOE	PSOE	Murcia	August 17, 2023	
Martínez Seijo, María Luz	PSOE	PSOE	Palencia	August 17, 2023	
Matos Castro, Sergio Carlos	PSOE	PSOE	Santa Cruz de Tenerife	August 17, 2023	
Matute García de Jalón, Oskar	Euskal Herria Bildu	Sortu	Biscay	August 17, 2023	
Mejías Sánchez, Carina	Vox	Vox	Barcelona	August 17, 2023	
Melgarejo Moreno, Joaquín	PP	PP	Alicante	August 17, 2023	
Mellado Sierra, Valle	PSOE	PSC	Tarragona	August 17, 2023	
Méndez Monasterio, Lourdes	Vox	Vox	Murcia	August 17, 2023	
Mercadal Baquero, Pepe	PSOE	PSOE	Balearic Islands	August 17, 2023	
Merino Martínez, Javier	PP	PP	La Rioja	August 17, 2023	
Mesquida Mayans, Joan	PP	PP	Balearic Islands	August 17, 2023	
Micó Micó, Àgueda	Sumar	Més-Com	Valencia	August 17, 2023	
Mínguez García, Montse	PSOE	PSC	Lleida	August 17, 2023	
Miñones Conde, José	PSOE	PSdeG-PSOE	A Coruña	August 17, 2023	
Moneo Díez, María Sandra	PSOE	PSOE	Burgos	August 17, 2023	
Montero Cuadrado, María Jesús	PSOE	PSOE	Seville	August 17, 2023	
Montesinos de Miguel, Macarena	PP	PP	Alicante	August 17, 2023	
Moraleja Gómez, Tristana María	PP	PP	A Coruña	August 17, 2023	
Morales Álvarez, Álvaro	PSOE	PSOE	Burgos	August 17, 2023	
Morant Ripoll, Diana	PSOE	PSOE	Valencia	August 17, 2023	
Moro Almaraz, María Jesús	PP	PP	Salamanca	August 17, 2023	
Muñoz Abrines, Pedro	PP	PP	Madrid	August 17, 2023	
Muñoz de la Iglesia, Ester	PP	PP	León	August 17, 2023	
Nacarino-Brabo Jiménez, Aurora	PP	PP	Madrid	August 17, 2023	
Narbona Ruiz, Cristina	PSOE	PSOE	Madrid	August 17, 2023	
Nasarre Oliva, Begoña	PSOE	PSOE	Huesca	August 17, 2023	
Navarro Lacoba, Carmen	PP	PP	Albacete	August 17, 2023	
Navarro López, Pedro	PP	PP	Zaragoza	August 17, 2023	
Nogueras i Camero, Míriam	Junts	JuntsxCat	Barcelona	August 17, 2023	
Noriega Gómez, Javier	PP	PP	Cantabria	August 17, 2023	
Núñez Feijóo, Alberto	PP	PP	Madrid	August 17, 2023	
Núñez González, Noelia	PP	PP	Madrid	August 17, 2023	
Olano Vela, Jaime Eduardo de	PP	PP	Lugo	August 17, 2023	
Ortega Smith-Molina, Francisco Javier	Vox	Vox	Madrid	August 17, 2023	
Palencia Rubio, Héctor	PP	PP	Ávila	August 17, 2023	
Paniagua Núñez, Miguel Ángel	PP	PP	Palencia	August 17, 2023	
Parra Aparicio, Julia	PP	PP	Alicante	August 17, 2023	
Parra Gallego, Agustín	PP	PP	Barcelona	August 17, 2023	
Pascual Rocamora, Sandra	PP	PP	Alicante	August 17, 2023	
Pastor Julián, Ana María	PP	PP	Pontevedra	August 17, 2023	
Pedreño Molina, Juan Luis	PP	PP	Murcia	August 17, 2023	
Peña Camarero, Esther	PSOE	PSOE	Burgos	August 17, 2023	
Perea i Conillas, María Mercè	PSOE	PSC	Barcelona	August 17, 2023	
Pérez Coronado, Pablo	PP	PP	Segovia	August 17, 2023	
Pérez López, Álvaro	PP	PP	A Coruña	August 17, 2023	
Pérez Ortiz, Isabel María	PSOE	PSOE	Málaga	August 17, 2023	
Pérez Osma, Daniel	PP	PP	Cuenca	August 17, 2023	
Pérez Recuerda, Isabel Gema	PP	PP	Málaga	August 17, 2023	
Pin Ferrando, Gala	Sumar	CatComú	Barcelona	August 17, 2023	
Pisarello Prados, Gerardo	Sumar	CatComú	Barcelona	August 17, 2023	
Planas Puchades, Luis	PSOE	PSOE	Córdoba	August 17, 2023	
Plaza García, Inés	PSOE	PSOE	Almería	August 17, 2023	
Poblador Pacheco, María Araceli	PSOE	PSOE	Alicante	August 17, 2023	
Pose Mesura, Modesto	PSOE	PSdeG-PSOE	Pontevedra	August 17, 2023	
Pozueta Fernández, Isabel	Euskal Herria Bildu	EH Bildu	Navarre	August 17, 2023	
Prieto Serrano, María Isabel	PP	PP	Córdoba	August 17, 2023	
Puente Santiago, Óscar	PSOE	PSOE	Valladolid	August 17, 2023	
Pueyo Sanz, Jorge	Sumar	Chunta	Zaragoza	August 17, 2023	
Pujol Bonell, Eduard	Junts	JuntsxCat	Barcelona	August 17, 2023	
Puy Fraga, Pedro	PP	PP	Pontevedra	August 17, 2023	
Quintana Carballo, Rosa	PP	PP	Ourense	August 17, 2023	
Quintanilla Navarro, Miguel Ángel	PP	PP	Madrid	August 17, 2023	
Rallo Lombarte, Artemi	PSOE	PSOE	Castellón	August 17, 2023	
Ramajo Prada, Óscar	PP	PP	Zamora	August 17, 2023	
Ramírez Carner, Arnau	PSOE	PSOE	Barcelona	August 17, 2023	
José Ramírez del Río	Vox	Vox	Córdoba	August 17, 2023	
Ramírez Martín, María Lourdes	PP	PP	Granada	August 17, 2023	
Ramírez Moreno, María de las Nieves	PSOE	PSOE	Málaga	August 17, 2023	
Ramos Esteban, César Joaquín	PSOE	PSOE	Cáceres	August 17, 2023	
Redondo Cárdenas, Gonzalo	PSOE	PSOE	Ciudad Real	August 17, 2023	
Regades Fernández, David	PSOE	PSOE	Pontevedra	August 17, 2023	
Rego Candamil, Néstor	Mixed	BNG	A Coruña	August 17, 2023	
Requena Ruiz, Juan Diego	PP	PP	Jaén	August 17, 2023	
Rey de las Heras, Luis Alfonso	PSOE	PSOE	Soria	August 17, 2023	
Reynal Reillo, Esperanza	PP	PP	Valencia	August 17, 2023	
Ribera Rodríguez, Teresa	PSOE	PSOE	Madrid	August 17, 2023	
Rivera Arias, Engracia	Sumar	IU	Seville	August 17, 2023	
Rivera de la Cruz, Marta María	PP	PP	Madrid	August 17, 2023	
Rives Arcayna, Caridad	PSOE	PSOE	Murcia	August 17, 2023	
Robles Fernández, Margarita	PSOE	PSOE	Madrid	August 17, 2023	
Robles López, Joaquín	Vox	Vox	Murcia	August 17, 2023	
Rodríguez Almeida, Andrés Alberto	Vox	Vox	Las Palmas	August 17, 2023	
Rodríguez Calleja, Patricia	PP	PP	Ávila	August 17, 2023	
Rodríguez de Millán Parro, María José	Vox	Vox	Madrid	August 17, 2023	
Rodríguez García, Isabel	PSOE	PSOE	Ciudad Real	August 17, 2023	
Rodríguez Gómez de Celis, Alfonso	PSOE	PSOE	Seville	August 17, 2023	
Rodríguez Salas, José Antonio	PSOE	PSOE	Granada	August 17, 2023	
Rodríguez Serra, Santi	PP	PP	Barcelona	August 17, 2023	
Rojas García, Carlos	PP	PP	Granada	August 17, 2023	
Rojas Manrique, Juan Antonio	PP	PP	Santa Cruz de Tenerife	August 17, 2023	
Rojo Blas, Alberto	PSOE	PSOE	Guadalajara	August 17, 2023	
Román Jasanada, Antonio	PP	PP	Guadalajara	August 17, 2023	
Romaní Cantera, José Ignacio	PP	PP	Cádiz	August 17, 2023	
Romero Pozo, Rafaela	PSOE	PSOE	Gipuzkoa	August 17, 2023	
Romero Vilches, María de los Reyes	Vox	Vox	Seville	August 17, 2023	
Ros Martínez, Susana	PSOE	PSOE	Castellón	August 17, 2023	
Rueda Perelló, Patricia	Vox	Vox	Málaga	August 17, 2023	
Rufián Romero, Gabriel	ERC	ERC	Barcelona	August 17, 2023	
Ruiz Boix, Juan Carlos	PSOE	PSOE	Cádiz	August 17, 2023	
Ruiz de Pinedo Undiano, Iñaki	Euskal Herria Bildu	EH Bildu	Álava	August 17, 2023	
Ruiz Solás, María de la Cabeza	Vox	Vox	Madrid	August 17, 2023	
Sáez Alonso-Muñumer, Pablo	Vox	Vox	Valladolid	August 17, 2023	
Sáez Cruz, Emilio	PSOE	PSOE	Albacete	August 17, 2023	
Sagastizabal Unzetabarrenetxea, Idoia	PNV	PNV	Biscay	August 17, 2023	
Sahuquillo García, Luis Carlos	PSOE	PSOE	Cuenca	August 17, 2023	
Salazar Rodríguez, Francisco José	PSOE	PSOE	Seville	August 17, 2023	
Salvador i Duch, Jordi	ERC	ERC	Tarragona	August 17, 2023	
Sánchez Díaz, María Carmen	PSOE	PSOE	Cádiz	August 17, 2023	
Sánchez García, José María	Vox	Vox	Alicante	August 17, 2023	
Sánchez Jiménez, Raquel	PSOE	PSC	Barcelona	August 17, 2023	
Sánchez Ojeda, Carlos Alberto	PP	PP	Las Palmas	August 17, 2023	
Sánchez Pérez, César	PP	PP	Alicante	August 17, 2023	
Sánchez Pérez-Castejón, Pedro	PSOE	PSOE	Madrid	August 17, 2023	
Sánchez Serna, Javier	Podemos	Podemos	Murcia	August 17, 2023	
Sánchez Sierra, María del Mar	PP	PP	Madrid	August 17, 2023	
Sánchez Torregrosa, María Isabel	PP	PP	Almería	August 17, 2023	
Sancho Íñiguez, Herminio Rufino	PSOE	PSOE	Teruel	August 17, 2023	
Santana Aguilera, Ada	PSOE	PSOE	Las Palmas	August 17, 2023	
Santana Perera, Noemí	Podemos	Podemos	Las Palmas	August 17, 2023	
Santiago Romero, Enrique Fernando	Sumar	IU	Córdoba	August 17, 2023	
Santos Maraver, Agustín	Sumar	Sumar	Madrid	August 17, 2023	
Sanz Martínez, Luisa	PSOE	PSOE	Valladolid	August 17, 2023	
Sarrià Morell, Vicent Manuel	PSOE	PSOE	Valencia	August 17, 2023	
Sastre Uyá, Miguel Ángel	PP	PP	Cádiz	August 17, 2023	
Sayas López, Sergio	PP	PP	Navarre	August 17, 2023	
Sémper Pascual, Borja	PP	PP	Madrid	August 17, 2023	
Senderos Oraá, Daniel	PSOE	PSE-EE-PSOE	Álava	August 17, 2023	
Serrada Pariente, David	PSOE	PSOE	Salamanca	August 17, 2023	
Serrano Martínez, Juan Francisco	PSOE	PSOE	Jaén	August 17, 2023	
Sierra Caballero, Francisco	Sumar	Sumar	Seville	August 17, 2023	
Simancas Simancas, Rafael	PSOE	PSOE	Madrid	August 17, 2023	
Soler Mur, Alejandro	PSOE	PSOE	Alicante	August 17, 2023	
Sumelzo Jordán, Susana	PSOE	PSOE	Zaragoza	August 17, 2023	
Taboadela Álvarez, Obdulia	PSOE	PSdeG-PSOE	A Coruña	August 17, 2023	
Tarno Blanco, Ricardo	PP	PP	Seville	August 17, 2023	
Tellado Filgueira, Miguel	PP	PP	A Coruña	August 17, 2023	
Teniente Sánchez, Cristina	PP	PP	Cáceres	August 17, 2023	
Tolón Jaime, Milagros	PSOE	PSOE	Toledo	August 17, 2023	
Tomás Olivares, Violante	PP	PP	Murcia	August 17, 2023	
Toscano de Balbín, Carla	Vox	Vox	Madrid	August 17, 2023	
Trenzano Rubio, Marta	PSOE	PSOE	Valencia	August 17, 2023	
Valero Morales, Juan Antonio	Sumar	IU	Málaga	August 17, 2023	
Valido García, Cristina	Mixed	CCa	Santa Cruz de Tenerife	August 17, 2023	
Vallugera Balañà, Pilar	ERC	ERC	Barcelona	August 17, 2023	
Vaquero Montero, Maribel	PNV	PNV	Gipuzkoa	August 17, 2023	
Varela Pazos, Marta	PP	PP	Madrid	August 17, 2023	
Vázquez Blanco, Ana Belén	PP	PP	Ourense	August 17, 2023	
Vázquez Jiménez, María del Mar	PP	PP	Málaga	August 17, 2023	
Vázquez Vega, Pablo	PP	PP	Madrid	August 17, 2023	
Velarde Gómez, Martina	Podemos	Podemos	Granada	August 17, 2023	
Velasco Morillo, Elvira	PP	PP	Zamora	August 17, 2023	
Velasco Retamosa, José Manuel	PP	PP	Toledo	August 17, 2023	
Verano Domínguez, Bella	PP	PP	Huelva	August 17, 2023	
Verdejo Vicente, Ferran	PSOE	PSC	Barcelona	August 17, 2023	
Verstrynge Revuelta, Lilith	Podemos	Podemos	Barcelona	August 17, 2023	
Vidal Matas, Vicenç	Sumar	MXM	Balearic Islands	August 17, 2023	
Vidal Sáez, Aina	Sumar	CatComú	Barcelona	August 17, 2023	
Zaragoza Alonso, José	PSOE	PSC	Barcelona	August 17, 2023	
