= Abades (disambiguation) =

Abades may refer to:

== Places ==
- Abades, a municipality of the province of Segovia, in the Spanish autonomous region of Castile and León
- Abades, Tenerife, a small holiday resort, in the Canary Islands, Spain

== Surname ==
- Cristina Abades (born 1971), a Spanish Galician politician
- Juan Martínez Abades (1862-1920), a Spanish painter, and also a songwriter
- Reyes Abades (1949-2018), a Spanish specialist in special effects
