= Punta Abona Lighthouse =

Lighthouse on Tenerife, Spain

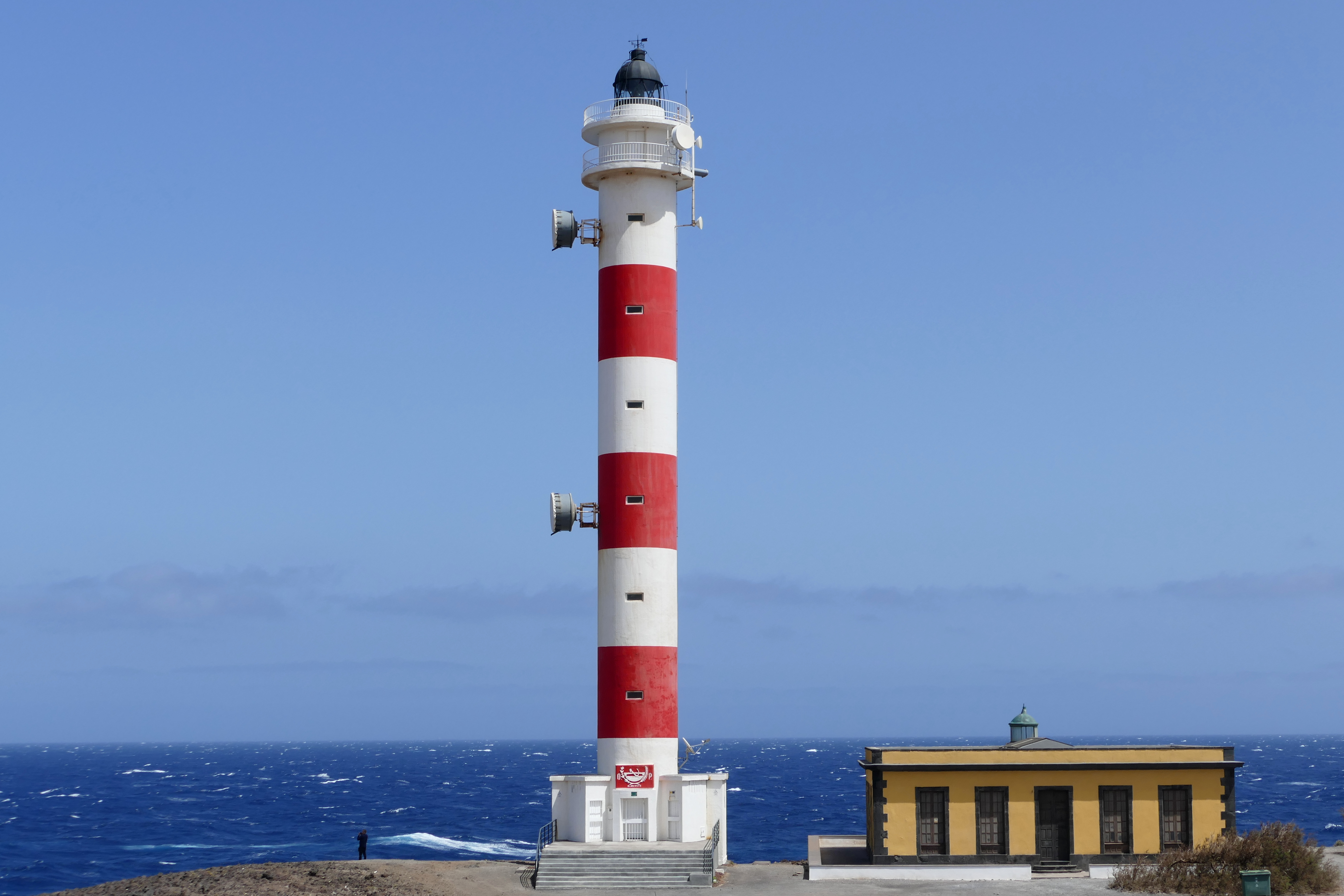
- The lighthouse in 2018
- Location: Arico; Tenerife; Canary Islands; Spain
- Coordinates: 28.148358°N 16.427146°W

Tower
- Constructed: 1902 (first)
- Construction: concrete tower (current) masonry tower (first)
- Height: 39 metres (128 ft)
- Shape: cylindrical tower with double balcony and lantern (current) lantern mounted non — the keeper's house roof (first)
- Markings: tower with red and white bands (current) white keeper's house, green lantern roof (first)
- Operator: Autoridad Portuaria de Santa Cruz de Tenerife

Light
- First lit: 1976 (current)
- Deactivated: 1976 (first)
- Focal height: 54 metres (177 ft)
- Range: 17 nautical miles (31 km; 20 mi)
- Characteristic: Fl (3) W 20s.
- Spain no.: ES-12870

The Punta Abona Lighthouse (Spanish: Faro de Punta Abona) is an active lighthouse on the south-eastern coast of Tenerife in the Canary islands. It is located between Abades and Poris de Abona, in the municipality of Arico. The lighthouse was the second to be constructed on the rocky headland of Punta Abona, which marks the south-east side of the island, and lies between the Punta de Anaga Lighthouse to the north and the Punta Rasca Lighthouse of Arona to the south.

== History ==
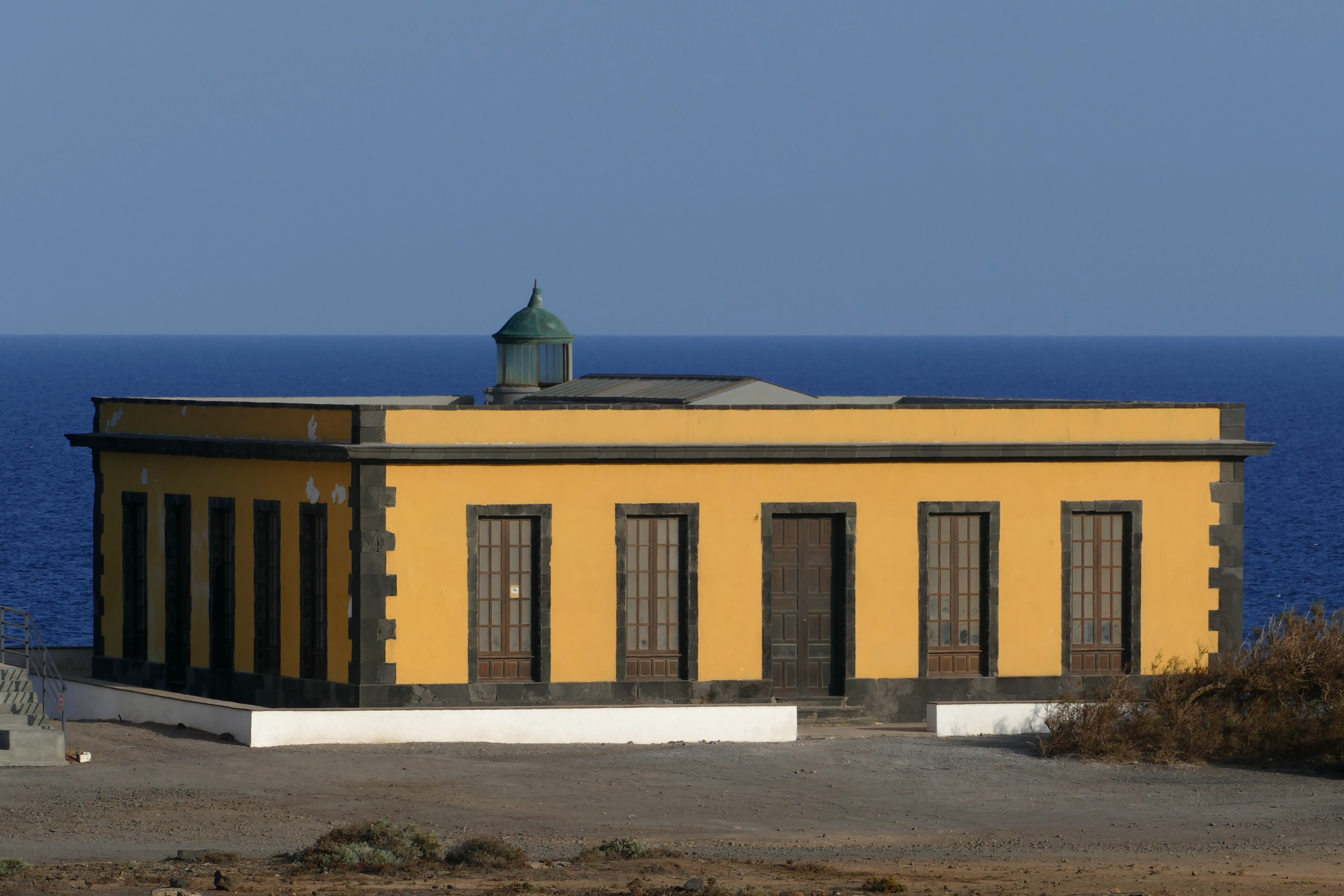
The first lighthouse at Punta Abona

The first lighthouse was completed in 1902, as part of the first maritime lighting plan for the Canaries, to act as a navigation aid for the coastal shipping between Santa Cruz de Tenerife and the ports of the western Canary Islands. Built in a similar style to other Canarian 19th century lights, it consists of a white washed single storey building, with dark volcanic rock used for the masonry detailing. This originally contained two separate living quarters, a warehouse, and an office grouped around a small courtyard. The lantern dome was attached to the flat roof of the building, on the seaward side, overlooking the Atlantic Ocean. It remained in service until it was replaced in the 1970s by the new modern tower.

In 2003, the disused structure was partially restored via a two-year programme of training in brick-laying and carpentry for unemployed youths. The aim was to convert the building into an academy for hotel staff, prior to final conversion into a museum and restaurant. These plans now seem to have been delayed or abandoned due to a lack of available investment.

The new lighthouse, which was built next to the original building first entered service in 1976. It consists of a 39 m high cylinder-shaped tower, which is white with red bands, that supports twin galleries and a lantern with a black cupola. The design is the same, except fifteen metres higher, than the new tower of Fuencaliente Lighthouse on La Palma. With a focal height of 54 m above sea level, the light can be seen for 17 nautical miles. Its light characteristic is made up of three flashes of white light every twenty seconds.

The lighthouse is maintained by the port authority of the Province of Santa Cruz de Tenerife. It is registered under the international Admiralty number D2829 and has the NGA identifier of 113-23828.

Map showing the principal lighthouses of Tenerife

== See also ==
- List of lighthouses in Spain
- List of lighthouses in the Canary Islands
