= Maria Teresa Ferrer i Mallol =

Catalan historian

- Born: 25 August 1940; Barcelona, Spain
- Died: 4 March 2017 (aged 76); Barcelona, Catalonia, Spain
- Occupation: Medieval historian

Academic background
- Education: University of Barcelona
- Thesis: Moros i cristians, almogàvers i collerats a la frontera d'Oriola (1984)
- Doctoral advisor: Emilio Sáez

Academic work
- Discipline: Medieval history
- Sub-discipline: 14th and 15th century Catalan history
- Institutions: Institut Milà i Fontanals; Institut d'Estudis Catalans
- Main interests: frontier history, maritime history, Mudéjar history

Maria Teresa Ferrer i Mallol (25 August 1940 in Barcelona – 4 March 2017) was a Spanish medieval historian, who worked at the Institut Milà i Fontanals and Institut d'Estudis Catalans.

== Early life and education ==
Maria Teresa Ferrer i Mallol was born in Barcelona on 25 August 1940. Ferrer i Mallol received a degree in philosophy in 1963 from the University of Barcelona, and completed a PhD at the same institution in 1984.

== Academic focus ==
Ferrer i Mallol's academic career spanned the years 1963 to 2011. Her work focused upon Catalonia in the 14th and 15th centuries, particularly economic and merchant trading in those periods. She believed that the Mudéjar Muslim, Jewish and Christian communities living in Catalonia and Valencia in the 14th century managed to co-exist due to religious segregation. She believed this segregation and discrimination was forced upon the Mudéjar community.

== Career ==
In 1972, she began working at the Institut Milà i Fontanals (IMF), initially as a Scientific Assistant for Emilio Sáez. From 1981–1984, she also worked on the Gran Enciclopèdia Catalana for the Generalitat de Catalunya. Regina Sáinz de la Maza was her understudy at the IMF between 1985 and 1994. In 1991, fellow Catalan medieval historian Josep Trenchs gave Ferrer i Mallol his last work, so that she could publish it for him posthumously. From 1992 until 2014, she was a member of the historical and archaeological department of the Institut d'Estudis Catalans (IEC). She was the secretary of the IEC from 1995–2001, then the vice-president from 2001–2006, and was president from 2006–2014.

In addition, Ferrer i Mallol wrote for the Anuario de Estudios Medievales, and collaborated with the University of Leeds on sections of the International Medieval Bibliography. She revised the historical commentary by Ferran Soldevila in a re-edition of The Four Great Chronicles. In 1993, she became a member of the Spanish Society of Medieval Studies. In 2002, she became Professor of Research at the IMF.

After her retirement in 2011, the IMF honoured Ferrer i Mallol by producing the work La Corona catalanoaragonesa, l'Islam i el món mediterrani. Estudis d'història medieval en homenatge a la doctora Maria Teresa Ferrer i Mallol (=The Catalan-Aragonese Crown, Islam and the Mediterranean World: Studies in Medieval History in Honour of Dr Maria Teresa Ferrer i Mallol).

== Death and legacy ==
Ferrer i Mallol died in 2017. Speaking after her death, Josep Massot i Muntaner, current president of the historical and archaeological department of the IEC, praised Ferrer i Mallol as "a great historian, highly distinguished and productive, who has left an important intellectual legacy to the institution that we will uphold". In 2017, she was posthumously awarded the Ferran Soldevila Prize for her work in medieval history.

== Works ==
- (with Emilio Sáez, Josep Trenchs i Odena and Lasoli Sáinz de la Maza) Diplomatario del Cardenal Gil de Albornoz (=Diplomatarium of Cardinal Gil de Albornoz), Regina, 1976-1995, ISBN 84-00-07548-X
- (with Arcadi García i Sanz) Assegurances i canvis marítims medievals a Barcelona (=Medieval Maritime Insurance and Exchange in Barcelona), 1983, ISBN 84-7283-043-8
- Els sarraïns de la Corona catalanoaragonesa en el segle XIV. Segregació i discriminació (=The Saracens of the Catalan-Aragonese Crown in the 14th century: Segregation and Discrimination), 1987, ISBN 84-00-06634-0
- La frontera amb l'Islam en el segle XIV. Cristians i sarraïns al País Valencià (=The Frontier with Islam in the 14th century: Christians and Saracens in the Valencian Country), 1988, ISBN 84-00-06814-9
- Organització i defensa d'un territori fronterer. La governació d'Oriola en el segle XIV (=Organisation and Defence of a Frontier Territory: The Governorate of Orihuela in the 14th century), 1990, ISBN 84-00-07074-7
- Corsarios castellanos y vascos en el Mediterráneo medieval (=Castilian and Basque Corsairs in the Medieval Mediterranean), 2000, ISBN 84-00-07903-5
- Entre la paz y la guerra. La Corona Catalano-aragonesa y Castilla en la Baja Edad Media (=Between Peace and War: The Catalan-Aragonese Crown and Castile in the Late Middle Ages), 2005, ISBN 84-00-08388-1
- Fuentes documentales para el estudio de los mudéjares (=Documentary Sources for the Study of the Mudéjars), 2005, ISBN 84-96053-15-6
