= Gago =

Gago can refer to surnames as well as first names. Notable people with the name include:

== Surname ==
- Cristina Agüera Gago (born 1990), Spanish politician
- Fernando Gago, Argentine footballer
- Francis Gago, Venezuelan pageant titleholder
- Gail Gago, Australian politician
- Jenny Gago, American Latina actress
- Kelly Gago (born 1999), French footballer
- Mariano Gago, Portuguese politician
- Peter Gago, Australian winemaker and author
- Roberto Jiménez Gago, Spanish footballer
- Carlos Viegas Gago Coutinho, Portuguese aviation pioneer

== Given name ==
- Gago Drago, professional Dutch-Armenian welterweight kickboxer and martial artist
