= Sancho Macerátiz =

Nobleman from the Kingdom of Pamplona

Sancho Macerátiz (died before 1075) was a nobleman from the Kingdom of Pamplona, of royal lineage, who exercised the tenence of Oca. The surname by which he is known, Macerátiz, could have been, according to the historian Gregorio Balparda de las Herrerías, a nickname that would come from the Basque "matzer" (deformed) or "matzertu" (deform), perhaps due to some physical deformity.

== Biographical sketch ==
Several historians, starting with Padre Moret and followed by others, including Balparda, Antonio Ubieto Arteta and José María Lacarra, have identified Sancho Macerátiz, who was a lieutenant in Oca with the infant Sancho Garcés who died on January 6, 1083, in the betrayal of Rueda and who was married to Constanza. They think that after being widowed in Constance, he contracted a second marriage with Andregoto, the documented wife of Sancho Macerátiz. However, Sancho Macerátiz's wife appears, already a widow, in the Monasteries of San Millán de la Cogolla in 1075 with her five children. The infant Sancho Garcés and his wife Constanza, on the other hand, are documented in 1074 in the monastery of Santa María de Otero de las Dueñas when his half-brother, the king Sancho Garcés IV donated some houses and land to them in Calahorra. It is impossible, then, that by 1075 the infant Sancho Garcés, who in 1074 appears with Constanza, had contracted a second marriage and was the father of five other children. In addition, Sancho Garcés did not die until seven years later (CE 1083), which indicates that he is a different character from Sancho Macerátiz who had already died by 1075.

The filiation of Sáncho Macerátiz is not known but, given his positions and his marriage to a descendant of Queen Andregoto Galíndez, he was probably a member of the royal house of Pamplona.

== Sources ==
- Balparda de las Herrerías, Gregorio de (1933–1934). Historia crítica de Vizcaya y de sus Fueros: Tomo II, Libro III. El primer fuero de Vizcaya, el de los Señores (in Spanish). Bilbao: Imprenta Mayli. OCLC 634212337.
- Canal Sánchez-Pagín, José M. (1986). "El conde leonés Don Fruela Díaz y su esposa, la navarra doña Estefanía Sánchez (siglos XI-XII)". Príncipe de Viana (in Spanish). 47 (177). ISSN 0032-8472.
- Canal Sánchez-Pagín, José María (2003). "El conde Gómez de Candespina: su historia y su familia". Anuario de Estudios Medievales (in Spanish) (33): 37–68. doi:10.3989/aem.2003.v33.i1.197. ISSN 0066-5061.
- Fernández Flórez, José Antonio; Herrero de la Fuente, Marta (1999). Colección Documental del Monasterio de Santa María de Otero de las Dueñas, I (854-1108) (in Spanish). León: Centro de estudios e investigación «San Isidoro» (CSIC), Caja España de Inversiones y Archivo histórico diocesiano. ISBN 84-87667-39-2.
- Martín Duque, Ángel J. (1983). Documentación medieval de Leire (Siglos IX a XII) (in Spanish). Pamplona: Diputación Foral de Navarra, Institución Príncipe de Viana. ISBN 84-235-0625-8.
- Salazar y Acha, Jaime de (1994). "Reflexiones sobre la posible historicidad de un episodio de la Crónica Najerense" (PDF). Príncipe de Viana (in Spanish) (201): 149–156. ISSN 0032-8472.
- Ubieto Arteta, Antonio (1976). Cartulario de San Millán de la Cogolla (759-1076) (in Spanish). Zaragoza: Anubar Ediciones. ISBN 84-7013-082-X.
