= Cristina Abades =

Galician politician

María Cristina Abades Martínez (born 1971) is a Galician politician from the People's Party who was elected to the 15th Congress of Deputies from Lugo in the 2023 Spanish general election.

She graduated from the University of Santiago de Compostela with a degree in law. She was in charge of Social Action at the Council of Lugo.

== See also ==
- List of members of the 15th Congress of Deputies
