= Jaime de Olano =

Spanish politician (born 1970)

Member of the Congress of Deputies
- Incumbent
- Assumed office 13 December 2011
- Constituency: Lugo

Personal details
- Born: 6 July 1970 (age 55)
- Party: People's Party

Jaime Eduardo de Olano Vela (born 6 July 1970) is a Spanish politician serving as a member of the Congress of Deputies since 2011. From 2011 to 2019, he was a municipal councillor of Viveiro.
