= Arico =

- Municipality and town
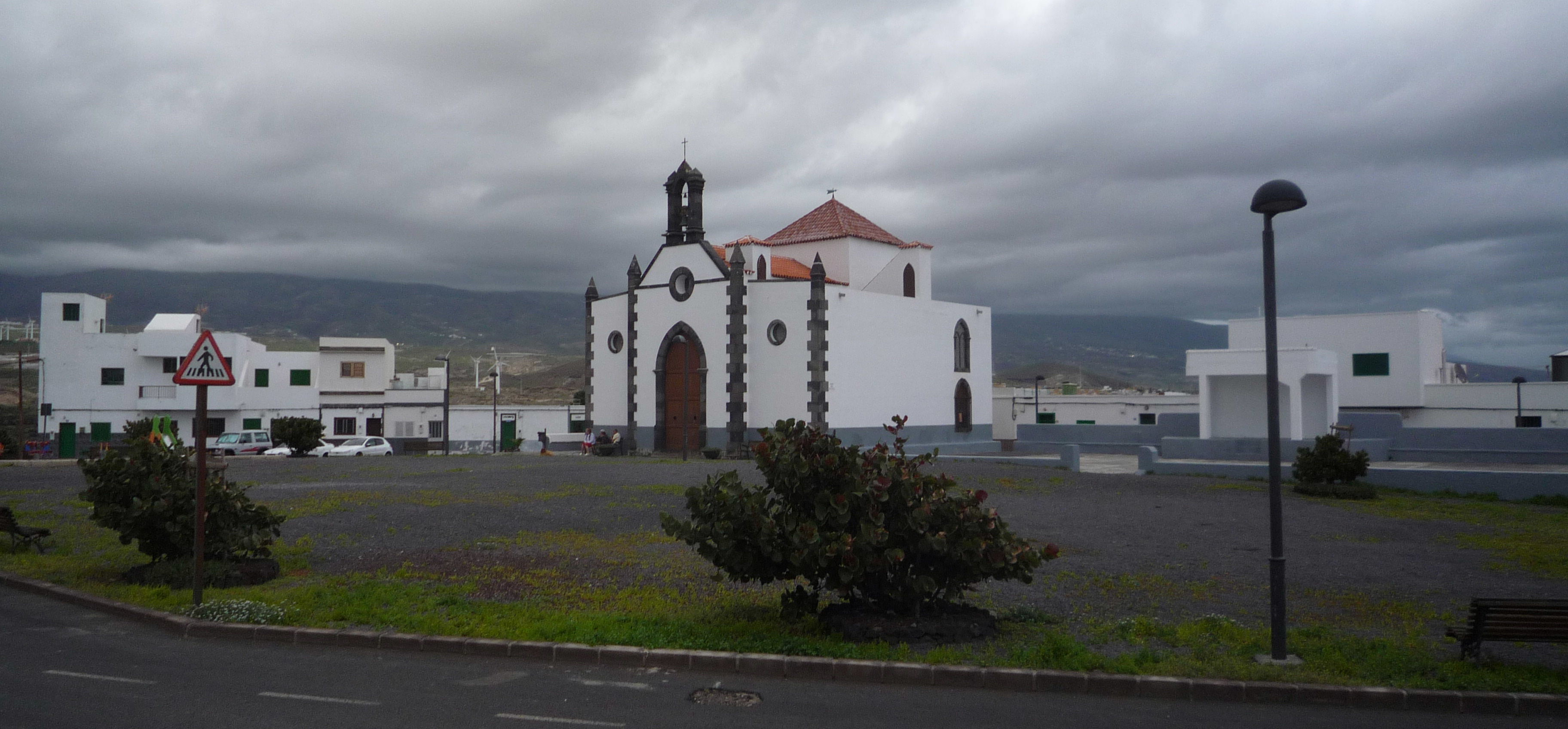
- Punta de Abona

- Flag Coat of arms

- Municipal location in Tenerife

- Location in Tenerife Arico (Canary Islands) Arico (Spain, Canary Islands)
- Coordinates: 28°10′N 16°28′W
- Country: Spain
- Autonomous community: Canary Islands
- Province: Santa Cruz de Tenerife
- Island: Tenerife

Government
  - Mayor: Sebastián Martín Pérez (Primero Arico)

Area
  - Total: 178.76 km^{2} (69.02 sq mi)

Population (2025-01-01)
  - Total: 9,505
  - Density: 53.17/km^{2} (137.7/sq mi)
- Time zone: UTC+0 (GMT)
- Post Code: 38580
- Climate: Csb

Arico is the name of a municipality and a village in the southeastern part of the island of Tenerife, one of the Canary Islands, Spain. It is part of the Province of Santa Cruz de Tenerife. The municipality is located in the southeastern part of the island, and extends for 178,76 square kilometers from the mountainous interior to the beaches on the Atlantic. Its estimated population is around 7,500. The TF-1 motorway passes through the eastern part of the municipality.

The city administration is located in Villa de Arico. The other villages located on this municipality are: Arico Nuevo, Arico Viejo, Abades, La Jaca, Tajao and Poris de Abona.

== Geography and climate ==
Arico has a hot semi-arid climate (Köppen: BSh; Trewartha: BSal) with an annual precipitation of only 184.7 millimetres (7.27 in) and no more than 38 days of precipitation.

Climate data for Arico Climate ID: C428T; coordinates 28°10′52″N 16°29′01″W; elevation: 418 m (1,371 ft); 1991–2020 normals, extremes 2009–present
| Month | Jan | Feb | Mar | Apr | May | Jun | Jul | Aug | Sep | Oct | Nov | Dec | Year |
|---|---|---|---|---|---|---|---|---|---|---|---|---|---|
| Record high °C (°F) | 29.5 (85.1) | 30.1 (86.2) | 33.4 (92.1) | 35.5 (95.9) | 37.8 (100.0) | 38.1 (100.6) | 41.3 (106.3) | 41.3 (106.3) | 37.0 (98.6) | 36.8 (98.2) | 34.5 (94.1) | 27.6 (81.7) | 41.3 (106.3) |
| Mean daily maximum °C (°F) | 19.6 (67.3) | 19.5 (67.1) | 20.3 (68.5) | 20.9 (69.6) | 22.5 (72.5) | 24.2 (75.6) | 26.6 (79.9) | 27.5 (81.5) | 25.8 (78.4) | 25.0 (77.0) | 22.3 (72.1) | 20.8 (69.4) | 22.9 (73.2) |
| Daily mean °C (°F) | 16.0 (60.8) | 15.8 (60.4) | 16.3 (61.3) | 17.0 (62.6) | 18.4 (65.1) | 20.1 (68.2) | 22.1 (71.8) | 23.1 (73.6) | 21.9 (71.4) | 21.2 (70.2) | 18.9 (66.0) | 17.4 (63.3) | 19.0 (66.2) |
| Mean daily minimum °C (°F) | 12.2 (54.0) | 12.1 (53.8) | 12.2 (54.0) | 13.0 (55.4) | 14.3 (57.7) | 15.9 (60.6) | 17.6 (63.7) | 18.6 (65.5) | 18.0 (64.4) | 17.3 (63.1) | 15.4 (59.7) | 13.9 (57.0) | 15.0 (59.0) |
| Record low °C (°F) | 9.5 (49.1) | 7.9 (46.2) | 7.7 (45.9) | 10.1 (50.2) | 10.7 (51.3) | 12.6 (54.7) | 14.6 (58.3) | 15.3 (59.5) | 15.8 (60.4) | 14.0 (57.2) | 11.6 (52.9) | 10.0 (50.0) | 7.7 (45.9) |
| Average precipitation mm (inches) | 17.2 (0.68) | 20.6 (0.81) | 17.9 (0.70) | 15.0 (0.59) | 9.6 (0.38) | 6.3 (0.25) | trace | 0.3 (0.01) | 8.0 (0.31) | 34.9 (1.37) | 17.5 (0.69) | 37.4 (1.47) | 184.7 (7.27) |
| Average precipitation days (≥ 0.1 mm) | 2.70 | 3.80 | 3.55 | 4.09 | 3.09 | 2.25 | 0.09 | 0.67 | 3.09 | 6.00 | 4.25 | 3.82 | 37.39 |
| Average relative humidity (%) | 66 | 67 | 69 | 72 | 69 | 70 | 66 | 67 | 75 | 72 | 71 | 66 | 69 |
Source: State Meteorological Agency/AEMET OpenData

== Sites of interest ==
Typical villages in the mountains, lighthouses in Poris de Abona and Tajao, important free-climbing spot and scuba diving location on Tenerife.

== Historical population ==
| Year | Population |
|---|---|
| 1991 | 4,567 |
| 1996 | 5,064 |
| 2001 | 5,824 |
| 2002 | 6,653 |
| 2003 | 6,928 |
| 2004 | 7,005 |
| 2005 | 7,159 |
| 2006 | 7,104 |
| 2007 | 7,565 |
| 2013 | 7,392 |

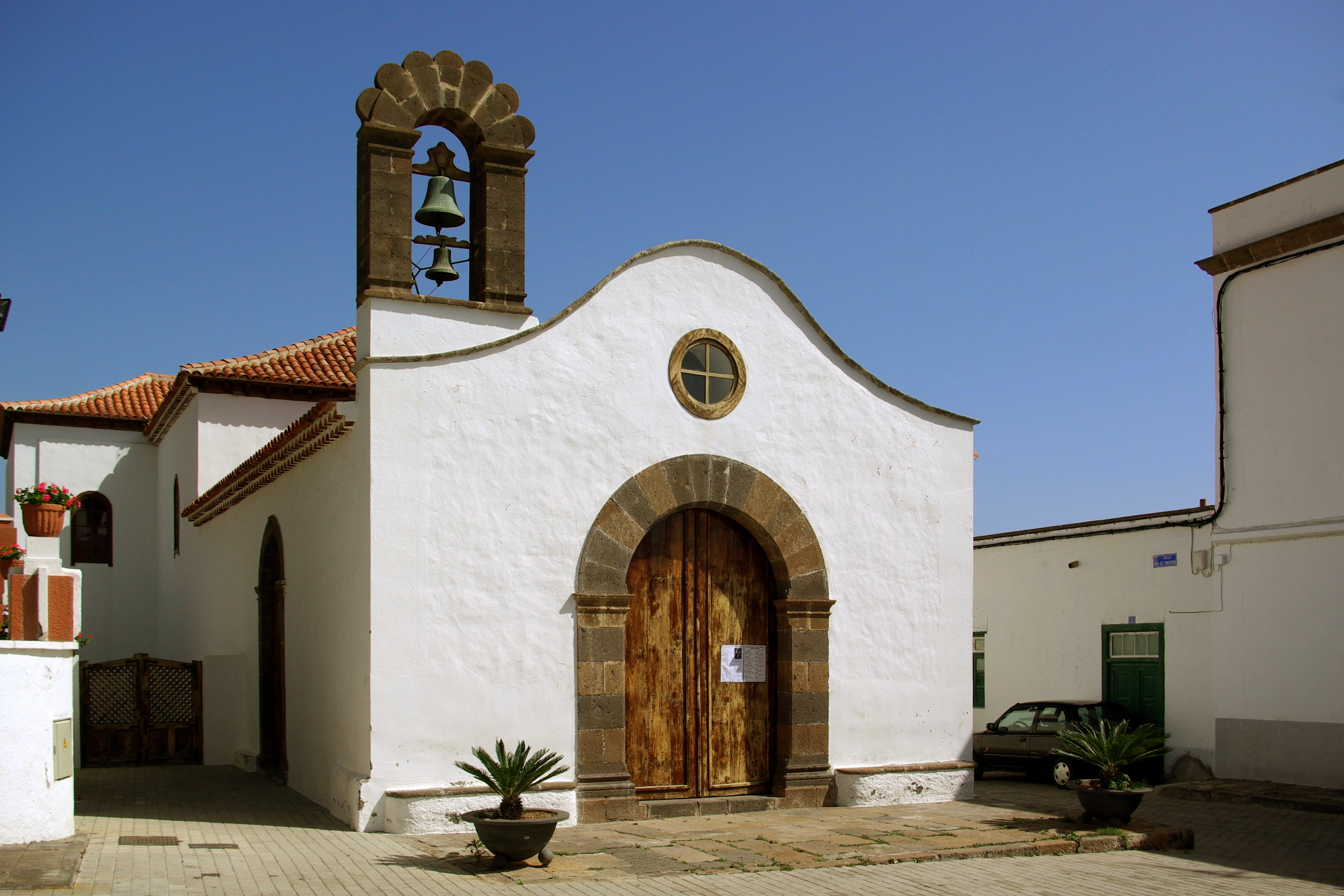
Arico el Nuevo

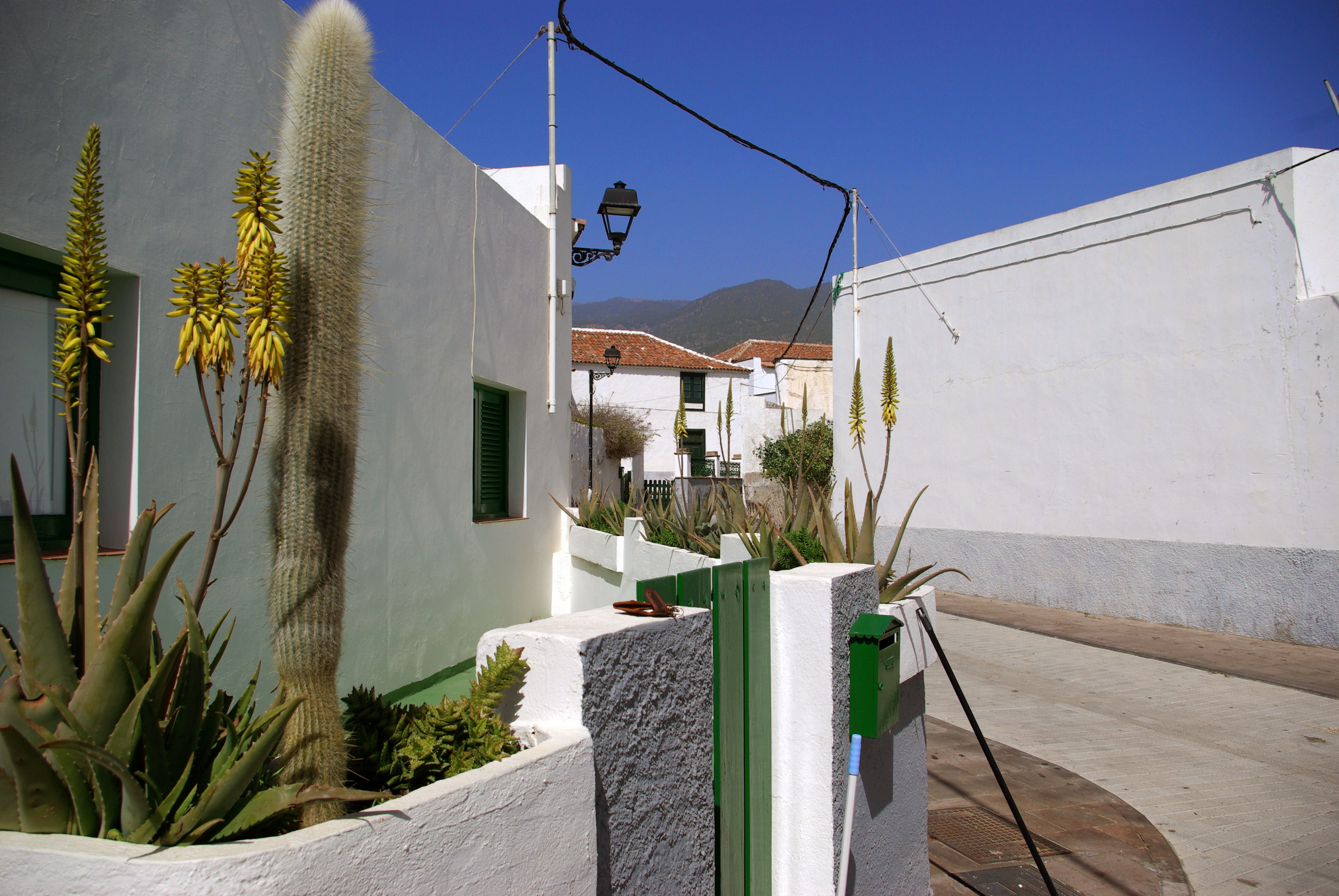
Arico el Nuevo
