= Pilar Vallugera =

Spanish politician

Member of the Congress of Deputies of Spain
- Incumbent
- Assumed office 3 December 2019
- Constituency: Barcelona

Member of Barcelona City Council
- In office 2003–2007

Personal details
- Born: Pilar Vallugera i Balañà; 13 October 1967 (age 58) Barcelona, Catalonia, Spain
- Citizenship: Spanish
- Party: Republican Left of Catalonia
- Other political affiliations: Republican Left of Catalonia–Sovereigntists
- Education: University of Barcelona

Pilar Vallugera i Balañà (born 13 October 1967) is a Spanish politician from Catalonia and a member of the Congress of Deputies of Spain.

== Early life ==
Vallugera was born on 13 October 1967 in Barcelona, Catalonia. She has a degree in law from the University of Barcelona.

Vallugera was a member of the National Front of Catalonia (FNC) and Crida a la Solidaritat. She joined the Republican Left of Catalonia (ERC) in 1988 and was the second vice-president of political action for its Barcelona branch. She was a member of ERC's national executive from 2006 to 2007.

== Career ==
Vallugera has worked for the Government of Catalonia since 1986. She was head of the head of the subscription unit from 1989 to 2003 and head of the editorial co-ordination unit of the Entitat Autónoma del Diari Oficial i de Publicacions (EADOP) from 2007.

Vallugera was president of the Casal de Ciutat Vella (1997-1999) and district councilor of Ciutat Vella (1999-2003). At the 1999 local elections she was placed 11th on the Republican Left of Catalonia–The Greens-Acord Municipal (ERC–EV–AM) electoral alliance's list of candidates in Barcelona but the alliance only managed to win three seats in the city and as a result she failed to get elected. She contested the 2003 local elections as a Republican Left of Catalonia-Acord Municipal (ERC–AM) candidate in Barcelona and was elected. At the 2007 local elections she was placed fifth on ERC–AM's list of candidates in Barcelona but the alliance only managed to win four seats in the city and as a result she failed to get re-elected.

At the April 2019 general election Vallugera was placed ninth on the Republican Left of Catalonia–Sovereigntists electoral alliance's list of candidates in the Province of Barcelona but the alliance only managed to win eight seats in the province and as a result she failed to get elected. She contested the November 2019 general election as a Republican Left of Catalonia–Sovereigntists electoral alliance candidate in the Province of Barcelona and was elected to the Congress of Deputies.

== Personal life ==
Vallugera has two children.

== Electoral history ==
Electoral history of Pilar Vallugera
Election	Constituency	Party	Alliance	No.	Result
1999 local	Barcelona	Republican Left of Catalonia	Republican Left of Catalonia–The Greens-Acord Municipal	11	Not elected
2003 local	Barcelona	Republican Left of Catalonia	Republican Left of Catalonia-Acord Municipal	3	Elected
2007 local	Barcelona	Republican Left of Catalonia	Republican Left of Catalonia-Acord Municipal	5	Not elected
2019 April general	Province of Barcelona	Republican Left of Catalonia	Republican Left of Catalonia–Sovereigntists	9	Not elected
2019 November general	Province of Barcelona	Republican Left of Catalonia	Republican Left of Catalonia–Sovereigntists	5	Elected
