= Silverio Argüelles =

Spanish politician (born 1976)

Member of the Congress of Deputies
- Incumbent
- Assumed office 17 August 2023
- Constituency: Asturias

Personal details
- Born: 3 July 1976 (age 49)
- Party: People's Party

Silverio Argüelles (born 3 July 1976) is a Spanish politician serving as a member of the Congress of Deputies since 2023. He is the chairman of the People's Party in Llanera.
