= Anuario de Estudios Medievales =

Spanish medieval history magazine

Anuario de Estudios Medievales (AEM) is a medieval history magazine published in Barcelona since 1964.

== History ==
It was founded in 1964 by the historian Emilio Sáez Sánchez, who also served as director of the publication. The magazine is published in Barcelona by the Milà and Fontanals Institution of the CSIC. Since 2000, an annual volume with two fascicles has been published regularly. In 2007 it was the Spanish history magazine with the greatest presence in library catalogs and the medieval history publication with the greatest visibility abroad. In 2014, it obtained, for the first time, the FECYT Quality Seal in recognition of editorial and scientific quality.

== Content ==
Anuario de Estudios Medievales publishes original research articles on various aspects of the Middle Ages: political, social, economic, cultural, religious history, science, art, literature, thought, philosophy, etc. The first fascicle, of a miscellaneous nature, is published in June and the second, dedicated annually to a different monographic theme, appears in December. In each fascicle, reviews and obituaries of eminent medievalists are also published.

== Direction ==
The direction of the magazine was in the hands of its founder Emilio Sáez Sanchez until 1988, although between 1983 and 1988 it was co-directed by Maria Teresa Ferrer i Mallol. From 1988, with the death of Emilio Sáez, the direction fell exclusively to Maria Teresa Ferrer, until 2010. Since then, the magazine has been directed by Roser Salicrú y Lluch, until 2019 Pere Verdes and Pijoan are in charge.
