= Cristina Agüera Gago =

Spanish politician (born 1990)

Cristina Agüera Gago MP
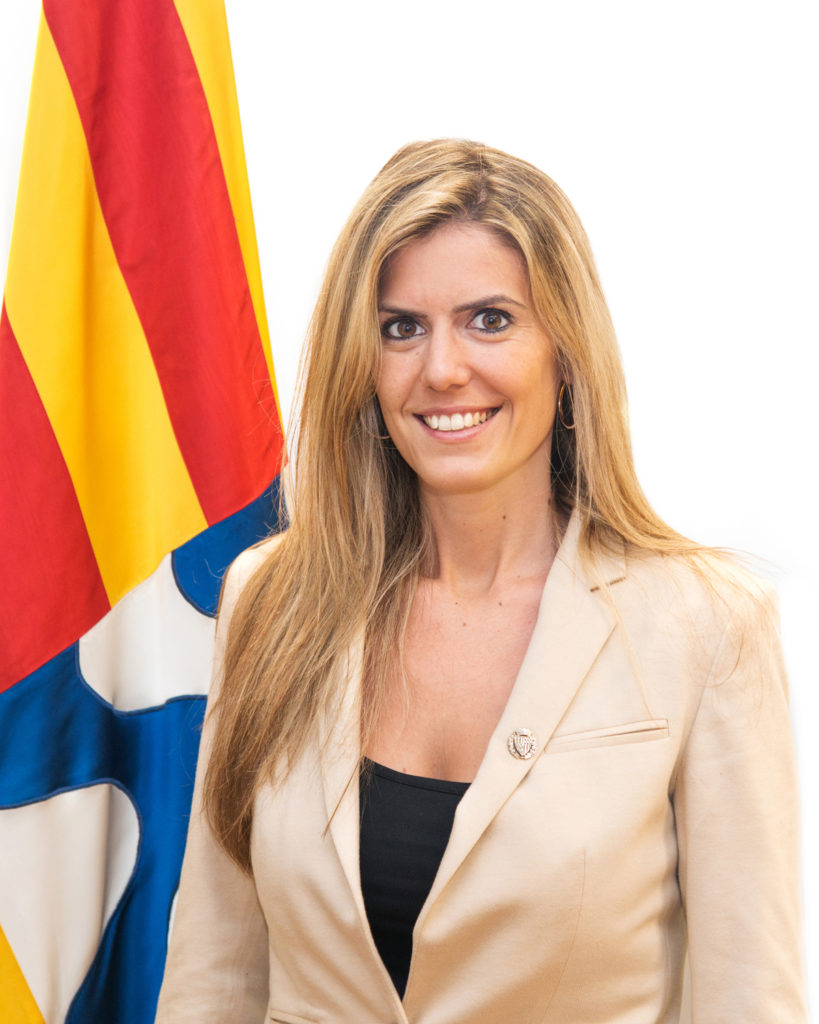

Member of the Congress of Deputies
- Incumbent
- Assumed office 2023
- Constituency: Barcelona

Personal details
- Born: Spain
- Party: People's Party

Cristina Agüera Gago (born 1990) is a Spanish politician from the People's Party. In the 2023 Spanish general election she was elected to the Congress of Deputies from Barcelona. She was born in Badalona.

== See also ==
- List of members of the 15th Congress of Deputies
