= Daniel Senderos =

Spanish politician (born 1977)

Member of the Congress of Deputies
- Incumbent
- Assumed office 25 February 2020
- Preceded by: Isabel Celaá
- Constituency: Álava

Personal details
- Born: 27 September 1977 (age 48)
- Party: Spanish Socialist Workers' Party

Daniel Senderos Oraá (born 27 September 1977) is a Spanish politician serving as a member of the Congress of Deputies since 2020. From 2019 to 2020, he was a member of the General Assembly of Álava.
