= Abades, Tenerife =

Coastal resort

Coordinates: 28°8′38″N 16°26′32″W

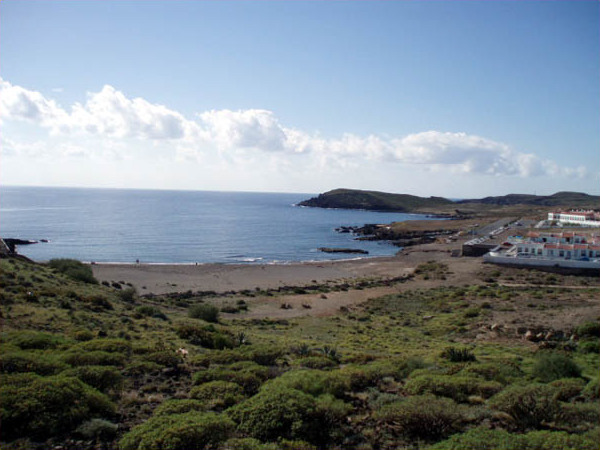
Abades beach

Abades “on Tenerife” is a small holiday resort located on the southeast coast of Tenerife, the largest of Spain’s Canary Islands, in the municipality of Arico, between Poris de Abona and La Jaca.

== History ==
=== The leprosy station ===
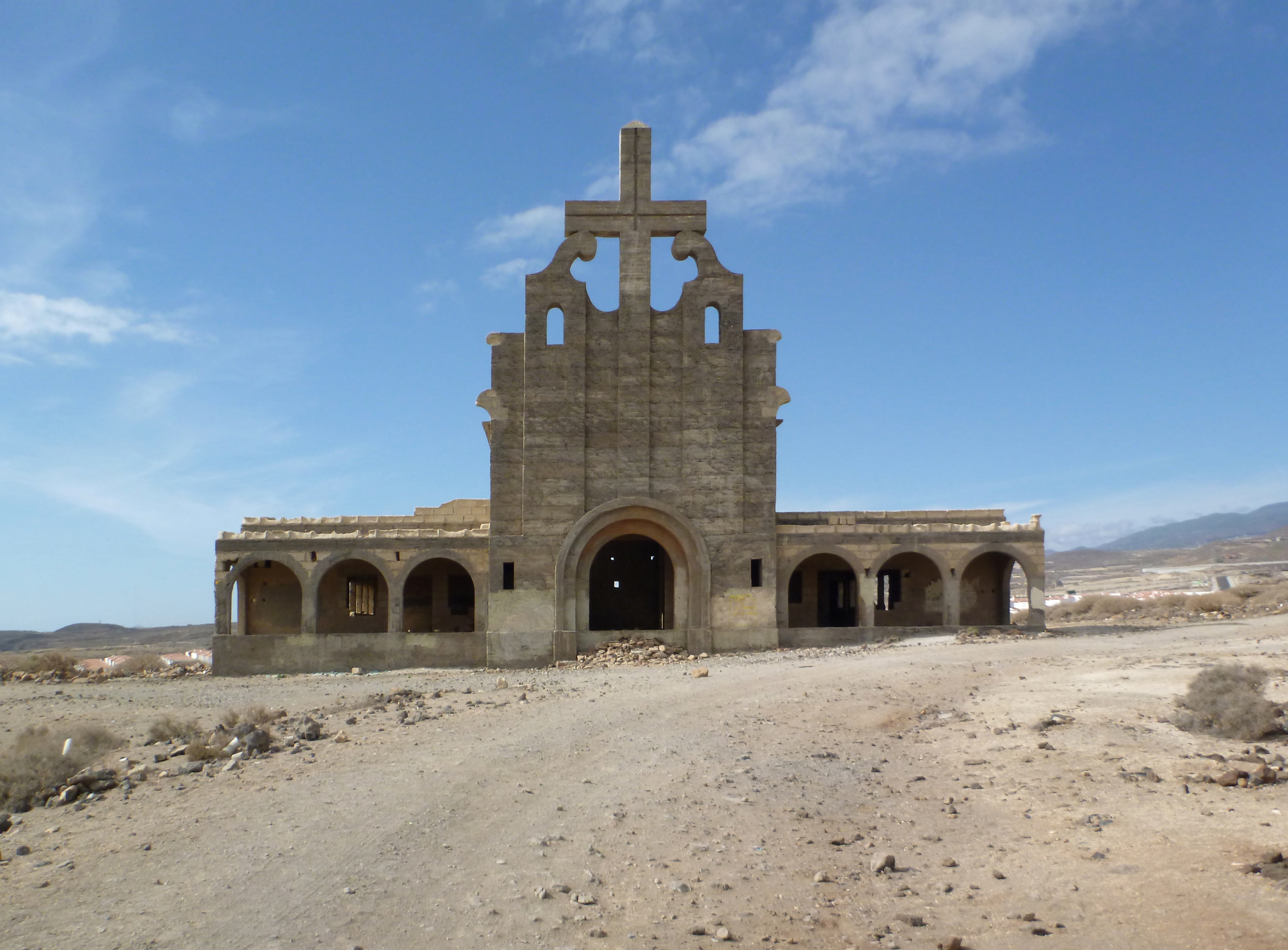
Church of the leprosy station Sanatorio de Abona

Leprosy was once a major disease in Tenerife, which led to the construction of a leprosy station in the north where the majority of the local population resided. Before the construction of a crematorium, bodies were disposed of in the sea outside Santa Cruz. In 1943, a leprosy village was built on the hill above Abades, complete with a hospital, crematorium, numerous bungalows, an administration building overlooking the sea, and a large concrete church in Francoist style, featuring a prominent cross that is visible from the nearby motorway. However, as medical advancements led to the near-eradication of leprosy in the Canary Islands, the village was never fully completed. The leprosy station later became a military training facility before being sold to an Italian in 2002. Although the church now lies in ruins, it remains in good condition.

=== From Los Abriguitos to Abades ===
Abades is the result of a relatively recent development. The former villages were higher in the mountains at the edge of the natural forest, usually where water could be obtained by digging gullies deep into the mountains to catch the water. Behind the “red mountain” of Abades is a small harbour, the “ensenada de Abades” (literally: Abades Cove), which was primarily used to ship the red stones from the local quarry to other islands as far as Cuba as well as for local fishermen. Goat keepers used to live in natural caves after the few winter rainfalls, then headed back to Arico during the long dry season. The lighthouse, halfway between Abades and Poris de Abona, was built in 1902 and replaced with a new tower in 1978. 1978 was a key year for the development of this area with the opening of the Tenerife South Airport Reina Sofia and the connection through the Autopista TF-1. Between 1978 and 1986, this place was named “Los Abriguitos”, and many wooden hutments were built to host the new tourists. In 1986, all wooden hutments were burned and the Abades project started with a wall facing the sea. In 1987, the square and the small church were built; in 1988, exit 18 on the motorway took its present shape; in 1993, the roads were covered with asphalt, and the tennis court and small park were finished.

=== Name changes ===
- 1943: Sanatorio de Abona
- 1978 – 1986: Los Abriguitos
- Since 1986: Abades

== Population ==
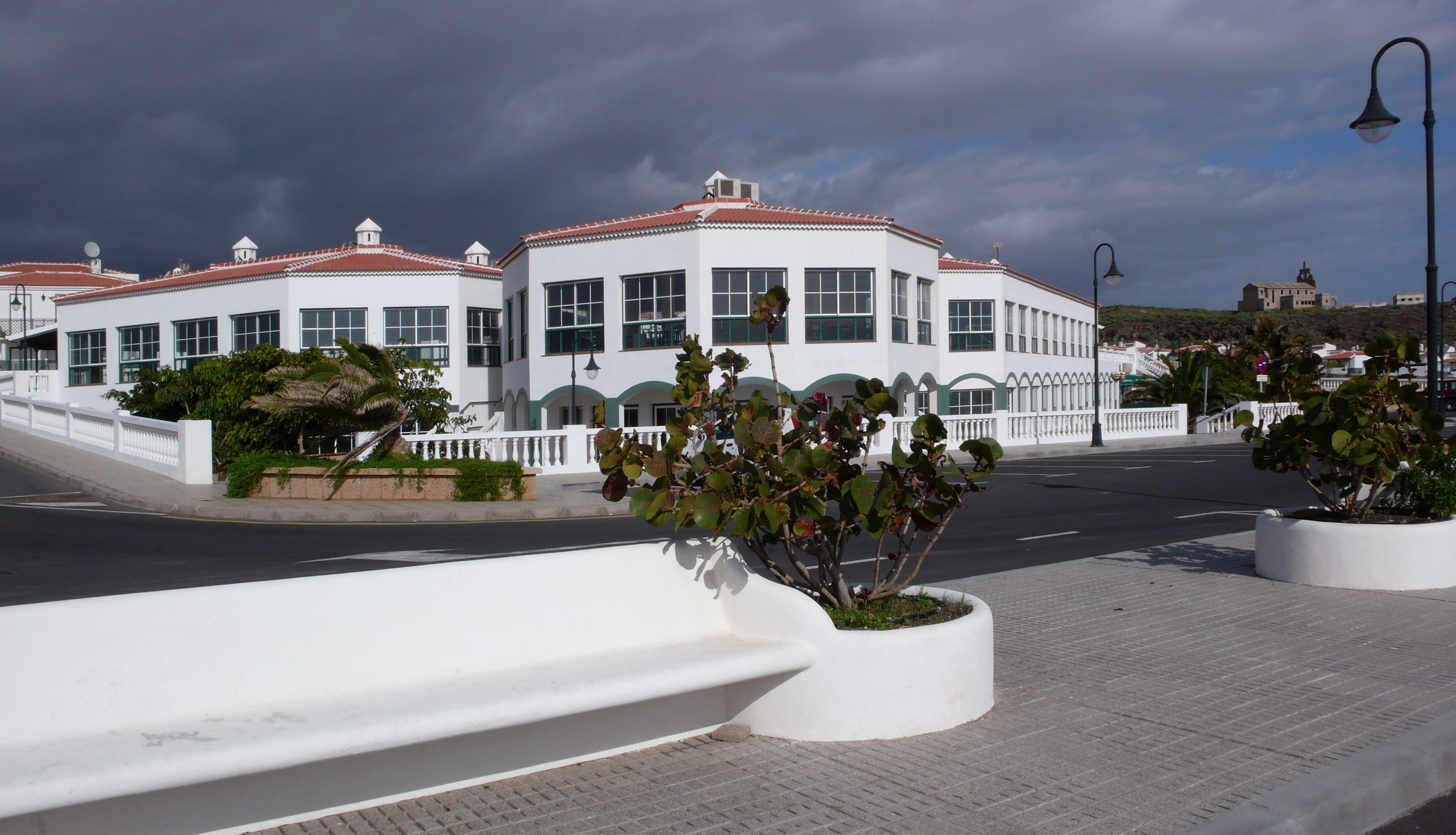
View over Abades

A majority of the 760+ small white bungalows are owned by Canarian people who live in the much wetter northern part of the island, some others are properties of senior German citizens who use them to spend the winter months on the island. Many of these bungalows are available to rent for long-term contracts as well as for short holidays. Most bungalows are built similarly, with white walls and dark green windows and doors.

== Tourism ==
Abades is a very quiet place to stay during the winter, but warm weekends and school holidays bring a sudden rush of activity. This resort has nine restaurants/pubs available around the square and in the new buildings close to the sea; two small supermarkets, two real estate offices, a Boxing- and a Fitness studio, and a scuba diving centre which are open every day. Access to the beach is disabled-people friendly and a shower has been installed end of 2007.

== Access ==
The access to Abades is very easy thanks to the motorway, only 12 minute drive from the Reina Sofia TFS airport, on the Autopista TF-1 direction Santa Cruz, former exit 18; now km 42. The TITSA bus line has the following connections:

- 111 connects Abades to the Los Cristianos / Playa de las Américas area as well as Santa Cruz de Tenerife
- 115 connects to Las Galletas
- 116 to El Medano
- 341 to the airport South Reina Sofia.

Neither 115 or 116 are currently in service

== Sources ==
- Domingo Martínez de la Peña y Gonzales (1991): Historia de Arico, ISBN 84-606-0134-X
- DVD "De Los Abriguitos a Abades" from the Ayuntamiento de Villa de Arico
