= Abades =

- Municipality
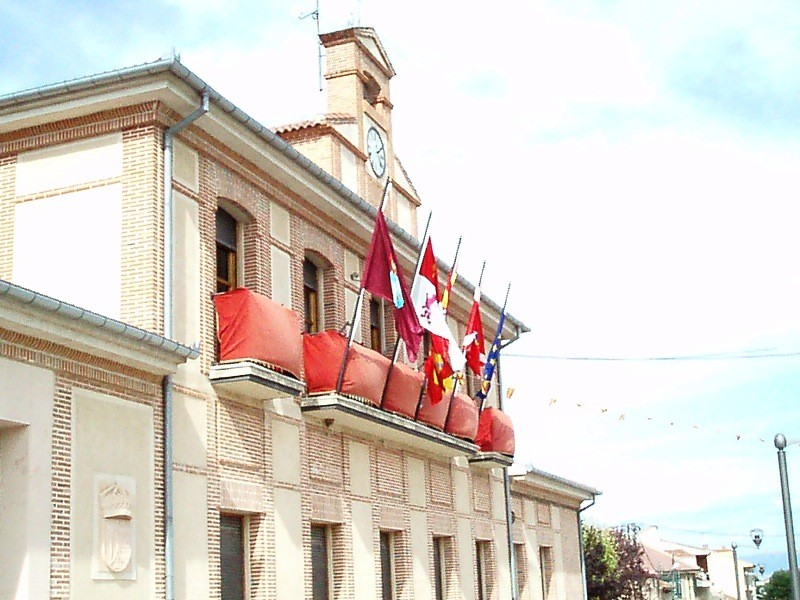
- Town hall

- Flag Coat of arms

- Location in Spain. Abades (Spain)
- Coordinates: 40°54′54″N 4°16′06″W
- Country: Spain
- Autonomous community: Castile and León
- Province: Segovia
- Municipality: Abades

Government
  - Mayor: Magdalena Rodríguez Gómez (People's Party)

Area
  - Total: 31.98 km^{2} (12.35 sq mi)
- Elevation: 971 m (3,186 ft)

Population (2019)
  - Total: 848
  - Density: 26.5/km^{2} (68.7/sq mi)
- Demonyms: abadero, -a bubillo, -a
- Time zone: UTC+1 (CET)
  - Summer (DST): UTC+2 (CEST)
- Website: Official website

Abades is a municipality of the province of Segovia, located in the Spanish autonomous region of Castile and León. It also forms part of the territory known as the Segovian countryside. According to the 2019 census (INE), the municipality has a population of 848 inhabitants.

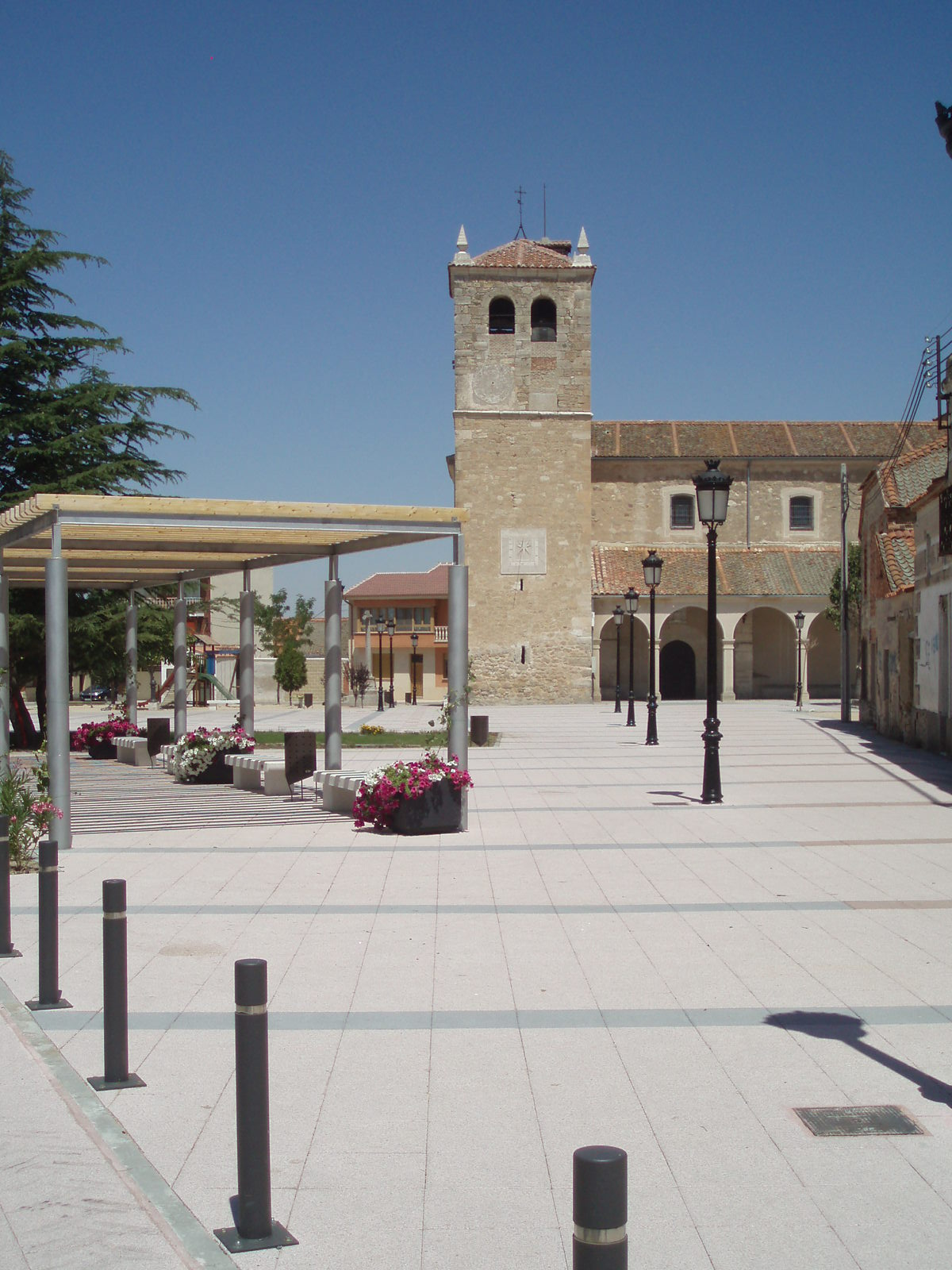
Church of Abades

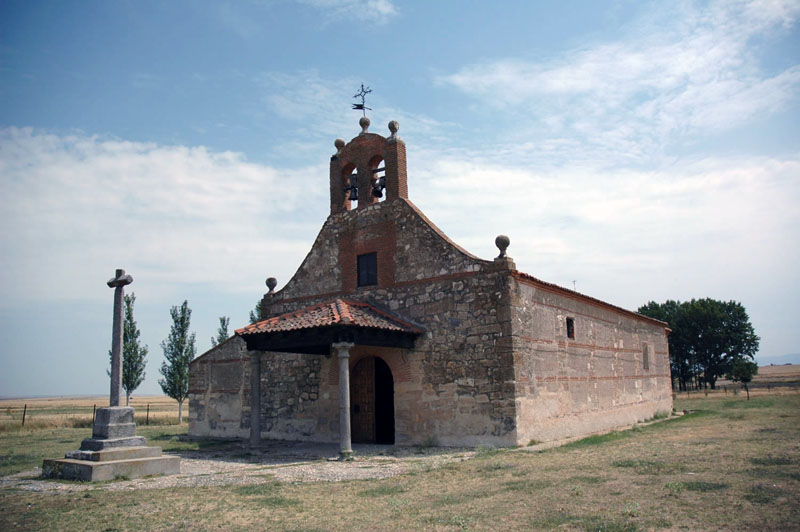
Hermitage de los Remedios

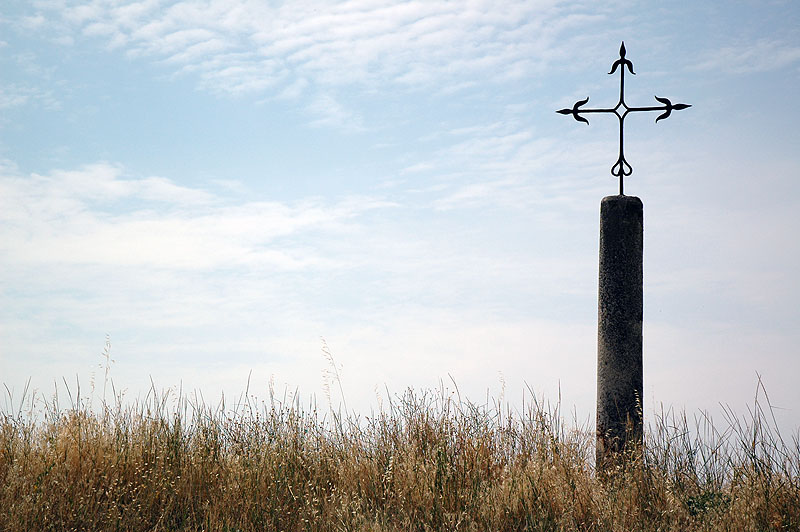
Cruz de la virgen

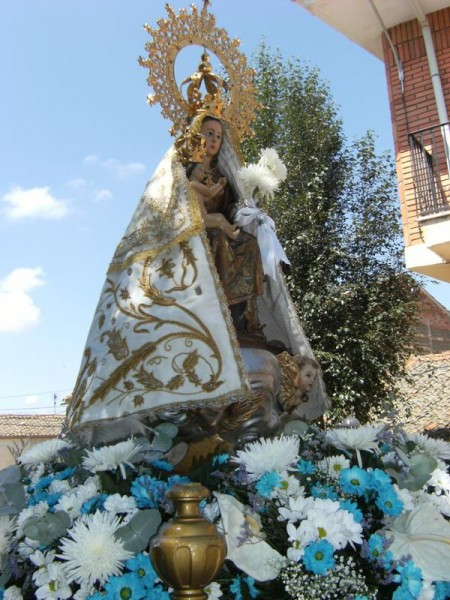
Virgen de los Remedios
