= Emilio Sáez =

Spanish politician (born 1969)

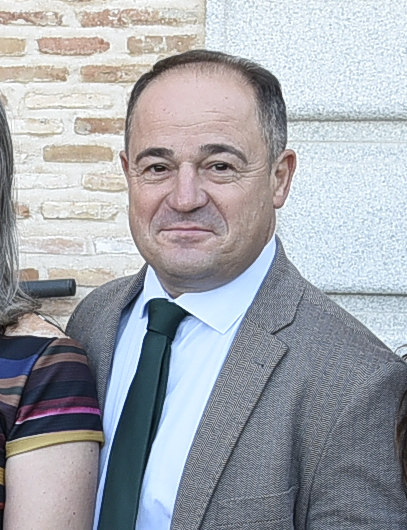

Emilio Sáez Cruz (born 1969) is a Spanish politician and former para-athlete.

Having been disabled by polio at age 3, he took part in the 1992 Summer Paralympics. As a member of the Spanish Socialist Workers' Party (PSOE), he was a member of the council in Albacete from 2011 to 2015 and 2019 to 2023, as well as mayor from 2021. Between his two terms in the council, he was a member of the Cortes of Castilla–La Mancha. In 2023, he was elected to the Congress of Deputies.

== Biography ==
Sáez was born in Macael in the Province of Almería. At age 3, he contracted polio. Aged 9, he moved to Seville, then to Albacete at 16 due to a girlfriend. He competed at the 1992 Summer Paralympics in Barcelona.

Sáez was elected to Albacete's city council in 2011. In the 2015 Castilian-Manchegan regional election, he was elected to the Cortes of Castilla–La Mancha by the Albacete constituency after a recount awarded the Spanish Socialist Workers' Party (PSOE) another seat at the expense of Podemos.

In the 2019 Spanish local elections, Sáez was his party's candidate for mayor, receiving the most votes but drawing with nine seats alongside the People's Party (PP). He formed a pact with the five councillors from Citizens (Cs) in which their leader Vicente Casañ would be mayor for two years and then him for the remaining two years; a mirror agreement was made for Ciudad Real, also in Castilla–La Mancha. The municipal vote for mayor on 9 June 2021 fell one short of a majority for Sáez due to a blank vote, but he was installed as mayor due to having led the most-voted list in the previous election.

Sáez was the leader of the PSOE list in the Albacete constituency for the Congress of Deputies in the 2023 election. The PP received 12,000 more votes than the PSOE, but the two shared the constituency's four seats.
