= Lugo (Congress of Deputies constituency) =

Electoral constituency in Spain

Coordinates: 43°00′N 7°30′W

- Congress of Deputies; Electoral constituency
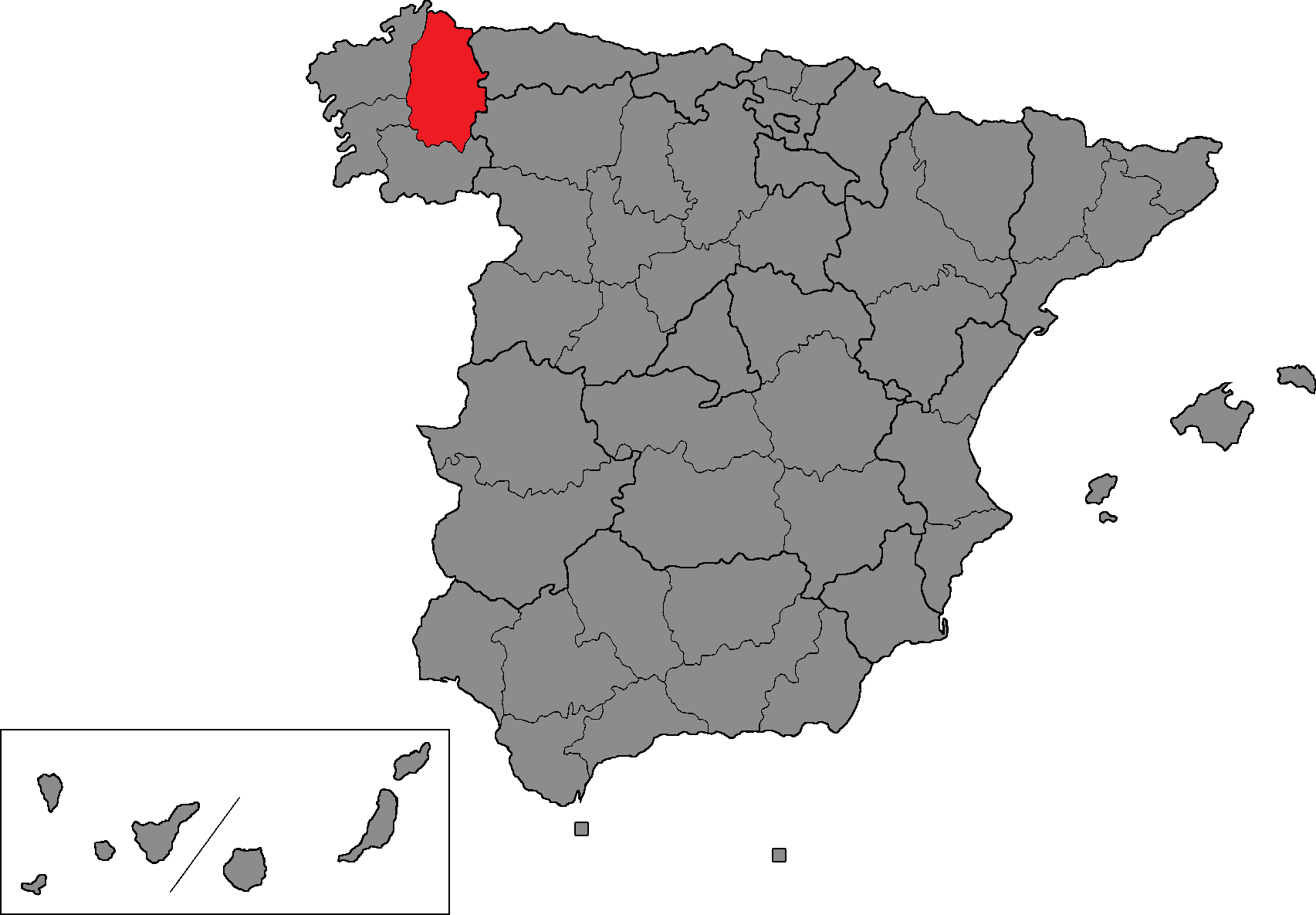
- Location of Lugo within Spain
- Province: Lugo
- Autonomous community: Galicia
- Population: ▲324,842 (2024)
- Electorate: ▼337,755 (2023)
- Major settlements: Lugo

Current constituency
- Created: 1977
- Seats: 5 (1977–1996); 4 (1996–present)
- Members: PP (3); PSOE (1)

Lugo is one of the 52 constituencies represented in the Congress of Deputies, the lower chamber of the Spanish parliament, the Cortes Generales. The constituency (whose boundaries correspond to those of the homonymous province) currently elects four deputies. The electoral system uses the D'Hondt method and closed-list proportional voting, with a minimum threshold of three percent.

== Electoral system ==
The constituency was created as per the Political Reform Law and was first contested in the 1977 general election. The Law provided for the provinces of Spain to be established as multi-member districts in the Congress of Deputies, with this regulation being maintained under the Spanish Constitution of 1978. Additionally, the Constitution requires for any modification of the provincial limits to be approved under an organic law, needing an absolute majority in the Cortes Generales.

Voting is based on universal suffrage, comprising all Spanish nationals over 18 years of age with full political rights, provided that they have not been deprived of the right to vote by a final sentence. The only exception was in 1977, when this was limited to nationals over 21 years of age and in full enjoyment of their political and civil rights. Amendments in 2011 required non-resident citizens to apply for voting, a system known as "begged" voting (Spanish: Voto rogado). which was abolished in 2022. Further, amendments in 2018 granted the right to vote to those legally incapacitated. The Congress of Deputies has a minimum of 300 and a maximum of 400 seats, with electoral provisions fixing its size at 350. Of these, 348 are elected in 50 multi-member constituencies corresponding to the provinces of Spain—each of which is assigned an initial minimum of two seats and the remaining 248 distributed in proportion to population—using the D'Hondt method and closed-list proportional voting, with a three percent-threshold of valid votes (including blank ballots) in each constituency. The remaining two seats are allocated to Ceuta and Melilla as single-member districts elected by plurality voting. The use of this electoral method may result in a higher effective threshold depending on district magnitude and vote distribution. The law does not provide for by-elections to fill vacant seats; instead, any vacancies arising after the proclamation of candidates and during the legislative term are filled by the next candidates on the party lists or, when required, by designated substitutes.

The electoral law allows for parties and federations registered in the interior ministry, alliances and groupings of electors to present lists of candidates. Parties and federations intending to form an alliance are required to inform the relevant electoral commission within 10 days of the election call—15 before 1985—whereas groupings of electors need to secure the signature of at least one percent of the electorate in the constituencies for which they seek election—one permille of the electorate, with a compulsory minimum of 500 signatures, until 1985—disallowing electors from signing for more than one list. Also since 2011, parties, federations or alliances that have not obtained a mandate in either chamber of the Cortes at the preceding election are required to secure the signature of at least 0.1 percent of electors in the aforementioned constituencies. Amendments in 2007 required a balanced composition of men and women in the electoral lists, so that candidates of either sex made up at least 40 percent of the total composition; further amendments in 2024 required the use of a zipper system.

== Deputies ==
Deputies 1977–present
Key to parties En Marea PSOE UCD PP CP CD AP
Legislature	Election	Distribution
Constituent	1977	4 / 1
1st	1979	1 / 3 / 1
2nd	1982	1 / 1 / 3
3rd	1986	2 / 3
4th	1989	2 / 3
5th	1993	2 / 3
6th	1996	1 / 3
7th	2000	1 / 3
8th	2004	2 / 2
9th	2008	2 / 2
10th	2011	1 / 3
11th	2015	1 / 1 / 2
12th	2016	1 / 1 / 2
13th	2019 (Apr)	2 / 2
14th	2019 (Nov)	2 / 2
15th	2023	1 / 3

== General elections ==
=== 2026 ===
Summary of the 29 November 2026 Congress of Deputies election results in Lugo
Parties and alliances	Popular vote			Seats	
Parties and alliances	Votes	%	±pp	Total	+/−
People's Party (PP)					
Socialists' Party of Galicia (PSdeG–PSOE)					
Galician Nationalist Bloc (BNG)					
Broad Front (Frente Amplio/Fronte Ampla)^{1}			n/a		
We Can (Podemos)^{1}			n/a		
Vox (Vox)					
Workers' Front (FO)					
The Party is Over (SALF)			New		
Blank ballots					
Total				4	±0
Valid votes					
Invalid votes					
Votes cast / turnout					
Abstentions					
Registered voters	341,031				
Sources
Footnotes: ^{1} Within the Unite Galicia alliance in the 2023 election.

=== 2023 ===
Summary of the 23 July 2023 Congress of Deputies election results in Lugo
Parties and alliances	Popular vote			Seats	
Parties and alliances	Votes	%	±pp	Total	+/−
People's Party (PP)	99,769	50.24	+12.20	3	+1
Socialists' Party of Galicia (PSdeG–PSOE)	60,163	30.30	–1.64	1	–1
Galician Nationalist Bloc (BNG)	17,197	8.66	+1.48	0	±0
Unite Galicia (Sumar)^{1}	10,287	5.18	–4.01	0	±0
Vox (Vox)	8,643	4.35	–3.78	0	±0
Animalist Party with the Environment (PACMA)^{2}	645	0.32	–0.34	0	±0
Workers' Front (FO)	233	0.12	New	0	±0
For a Fairer World (PUM+J)	149	0.08	–0.04	0	±0
Communist Party of the Workers of Galicia (PCTG)	116	0.06	–0.01	0	±0
Zero Cuts (Recortes Cero)	113	0.06	–0.07	0	±0
Blank ballots	1,251	0.63	–0.53		
Total	198,566			4	±0
Valid votes	198,566	98.93	+0.57		
Invalid votes	2,143	1.07	–0.57		
Votes cast / turnout	200,709	59.42	+6.25		
Abstentions	137,046	40.58	–6.25		
Registered voters	337,755				
Sources
Footnotes: ^{1} Unite Galicia results are compared to In Common–United We Can totals in the November 2019 election.; ^{2} Animalist Party with the Environment results are compared to Animalist Party Against Mistreatment of Animals totals in the November 2019 election.

=== November 2019 ===
Summary of the 10 November 2019 Congress of Deputies election results in Lugo
Parties and alliances	Popular vote			Seats	
Parties and alliances	Votes	%	±pp	Total	+/−
People's Party (PP)	68,530	38.04	+4.44	2	±0
Socialists' Party of Galicia (PSdeG–PSOE)	57,537	31.94	–1.28	2	±0
In Common–United We Can (Podemos–EU)	16,548	9.19	–0.95	0	±0
Vox (Vox)	14,652	8.13	+2.40	0	±0
Galician Nationalist Bloc (BNG)	12,940	7.18	+2.35	0	±0
Citizens–Party of the Citizenry (Cs)	5,811	3.23	–5.68	0	±0
Animalist Party Against Mistreatment of Animals (PACMA)	1,190	0.66	–0.14	0	±0
Zero Cuts–Green Group (Recortes Cero–GV)	237	0.13	–0.02	0	±0
For a Fairer World (PUM+J)	221	0.12	New	0	±0
Spanish Communist Workers' Party (PCOE)	178	0.10	New	0	±0
Communist Party of the Workers of Galicia (PCTG)	135	0.07	–0.08	0	±0
XXI Convergence (C21)	72	0.04	±0.00	0	±0
Blank ballots	2,094	1.16	±0.00		
Total	180,145			4	±0
Valid votes	180,145	98.36	+0.20		
Invalid votes	2,996	1.64	–0.20		
Votes cast / turnout	183,141	53.17	–5.88		
Abstentions	161,305	46.83	+5.88		
Registered voters	344,446				

=== April 2019 ===
Summary of the 28 April 2019 Congress of Deputies election results in Lugo
Parties and alliances	Popular vote			Seats	
Parties and alliances	Votes	%	±pp	Total	+/−
People's Party (PP)	67,191	33.60	–13.83	2	±0
Socialists' Party of Galicia (PSdeG–PSOE)	66,441	33.22	+9.49	2	+1
In Common–United We Can (Podemos–EU–Mareas en Común–Equo)^{1}	20,282	10.14	–6.83	0	–1
Citizens–Party of the Citizenry (Cs)	17,812	8.91	+1.99	0	±0
Vox (Vox)	11,450	5.73	New	0	±0
Galician Nationalist Bloc (BNG)	9,658	4.83	+2.23	0	±0
In Tide (En Marea)	2,168	1.08	New	0	±0
Animalist Party Against Mistreatment of Animals (PACMA)	1,602	0.80	–0.20	0	±0
Commitment to Galicia (CxG)	391	0.20	New	0	±0
Zero Cuts–Green Group (Recortes Cero–GV)	306	0.15	–0.12	0	±0
Communist Party of the Workers of Galicia (PCTG)	304	0.15	New	0	±0
XXI Convergence (C21)	73	0.04	New	0	±0
Blank ballots	2,320	1.16	+0.08		
Total	199,998			4	±0
Valid votes	199,998	98.16	–0.15		
Invalid votes	3,753	1.84	+0.15		
Votes cast / turnout	203,751	59.05	+2.74		
Abstentions	141,287	40.95	–2.74		
Registered voters	345,038				
Sources
Footnotes: ^{1} In Common–United We Can results are compared to Podemos–Anova–EU totals in the 2016 election.

=== 2016 ===
Summary of the 26 June 2016 Congress of Deputies election results in Lugo
Parties and alliances	Popular vote			Seats	
Parties and alliances	Votes	%	±pp	Total	+/−
People's Party (PP)	91,516	47.43	+4.92	2	±0
Socialists' Party of Galicia (PSdeG–PSOE)	45,796	23.73	–0.25	1	±0
In Tide (Podemos–Anova–EU)	32,752	16.97	–2.27	1	±0
Citizens–Party of the Citizenry (C's)	13,343	6.92	–0.67	0	±0
Galician Nationalist Bloc–We–Galician Candidacy (BNG–Nós)^{1}	5,009	2.60	–0.97	0	±0
Animalist Party Against Mistreatment of Animals (PACMA)	1,939	1.00	+0.20	0	±0
Zero Cuts–Green Group (Recortes Cero–GV)	514	0.27	+0.05	0	±0
Blank ballots	2,088	1.08	–0.12		
Total	192,957			4	±0
Valid votes	192,957	98.31	+0.11		
Invalid votes	3,315	1.69	–0.11		
Votes cast / turnout	196,272	56.31	–2.93		
Abstentions	152,289	43.69	+2.93		
Registered voters	348,561				
Sources
Footnotes: ^{1} Galician Nationalist Bloc–We–Galician Candidacy results are compared to We–Galician Candidacy totals in the 2015 election.

=== 2015 ===
Summary of the 20 December 2015 Congress of Deputies election results in Lugo
Parties and alliances	Popular vote			Seats	
Parties and alliances	Votes	%	±pp	Total	+/−
People's Party (PP)	86,446	42.51	–13.59	2	–1
Socialists' Party of Galicia (PSdeG–PSOE)	48,772	23.98	–4.37	1	±0
In Tide (Podemos–Anova–EU)^{1}	39,122	19.24	+16.19	1	+1
Citizens–Party of the Citizenry (C's)	15,441	7.59	New	0	±0
We–Galician Candidacy (Nós)^{2}	7,253	3.57	–5.58	0	±0
Animalist Party Against Mistreatment of Animals (PACMA)	1,633	0.80	+0.31	0	±0
Union, Progress and Democracy (UPyD)	971	0.48	–0.45	0	±0
Zero Cuts–Green Group (Recortes Cero–GV)	443	0.22	New	0	±0
Communists of Galicia (PCPE–CdG)	421	0.21	New	0	±0
Land Party (PT)	405	0.20	New	0	±0
Blank ballots	2,445	1.20	–0.48		
Total	203,352			4	±0
Valid votes	203,352	98.20	–0.01		
Invalid votes	3,732	1.80	+0.01		
Votes cast / turnout	207,084	59.24	–3.57		
Abstentions	142,463	40.76	+3.57		
Registered voters	349,547				
Sources
Footnotes: ^{1} In Tide results are compared to United Left–The Greens: Plural Left totals in the 2011 election.; ^{2} We–Galician Candidacy results are compared to Galician Nationalist Bloc totals in the 2011 election.

=== 2011 ===
Summary of the 20 November 2011 Congress of Deputies election results in Lugo
Parties and alliances	Popular vote			Seats	
Parties and alliances	Votes	%	±pp	Total	+/−
People's Party (PP)	121,422	56.10	+11.58	3	+1
Socialists' Party of Galicia (PSdeG–PSOE)	61,357	28.35	–13.10	1	–1
Galician Nationalist Bloc (BNG)	19,811	9.15	–1.64	0	±0
United Left–The Greens: Plural Left (EU–V)	6,603	3.05	+2.10	0	±0
Union, Progress and Democracy (UPyD)	2,020	0.93	+0.46	0	±0
Animalist Party Against Mistreatment of Animals (PACMA)	1,054	0.49	New	0	±0
Communist Unification of Spain (UCE)	293	0.14	New	0	±0
XXI Convergence (C.XXI)	247	0.11	New	0	±0
Blank ballots	3,628	1.68	+0.77		
Total	216,435			4	±0
Valid votes	216,435	98.21	–1.08		
Invalid votes	3,944	1.79	+1.08		
Votes cast / turnout	220,379	62.81	–9.20		
Abstentions	130,472	37.19	+9.20		
Registered voters	350,851				

=== 2008 ===
Summary of the 9 March 2008 Congress of Deputies election results in Lugo
Parties and alliances	Popular vote			Seats	
Parties and alliances	Votes	%	±pp	Total	+/−
People's Party (PP)	110,312	44.52	–5.19	2	±0
Socialists' Party of Galicia (PSdeG–PSOE)	102,693	41.45	+4.28	2	±0
Galician Nationalist Bloc (BNG)	26,743	10.79	+0.64	0	±0
United Left–Alternative (EU–IU)	2,358	0.95	–0.08	0	±0
Union, Progress and Democracy (UPyD)	1,168	0.47	New	0	±0
The Greens of Europe (LVdE)	551	0.22	New	0	±0
Social Democratic Party (PSD)	383	0.15	New	0	±0
For a Fairer World (PUM+J)	266	0.11	New	0	±0
Communist Party of the Galician People (PCPG)	188	0.08	New	0	±0
Alternative in Blank (ABLA)	182	0.07	New	0	±0
Family and Life Party (PFyV)	178	0.07	New	0	±0
Spanish Phalanx of the CNSO (FE de las JONS)	154	0.06	+0.03	0	±0
Citizens–Party of the Citizenry (C's)	124	0.05	New	0	±0
Humanist Party (PH)	123	0.05	–0.06	0	±0
National Alliance (AN)	58	0.02	New	0	±0
Spanish Alternative (AES)	37	0.01	New	0	±0
Blank ballots	2,252	0.91	–0.27		
Total	247,770			4	±0
Valid votes	247,770	99.29	+0.01		
Invalid votes	1,764	0.71	–0.01		
Votes cast / turnout	249,534	72.01	–0.30		
Abstentions	97,000	27.99	+0.30		
Registered voters	346,534				

=== 2004 ===
Summary of the 14 March 2004 Congress of Deputies election results in Lugo
Parties and alliances	Popular vote			Seats	
Parties and alliances	Votes	%	±pp	Total	+/−
People's Party (PP)	123,986	49.71	–8.26	2	–1
Socialists' Party of Galicia (PSdeG–PSOE)	92,708	37.17	+14.26	2	+1
Galician Nationalist Bloc (BNG)	25,313	10.15	–6.02	0	±0
United Left (EU–IU)	2,570	1.03	+0.04	0	±0
Party of Self-employed and Professionals (AUTONOMO)	323	0.13	±0.00	0	±0
Humanist Party (PH)	274	0.11	+0.04	0	±0
Democratic and Social Centre (CDS)	271	0.11	–0.02	0	±0
Galician People's Front (FPG)	220	0.09	+0.02	0	±0
Galician Coalition (CG)	211	0.08	–0.07	0	±0
National Democracy (DN)	150	0.06	New	0	±0
Spanish Democratic Party (PADE)	132	0.05	+0.02	0	±0
Republican Left–Galician Republican Left (IR–ERG)	122	0.05	New	0	±0
Spanish Phalanx of the CNSO (FE de las JONS)	81	0.03	New	0	±0
The Phalanx (FE)	70	0.03	–0.02	0	±0
Republican Social Movement (MSR)	68	0.03	New	0	±0
Blank ballots	2,935	1.18	+0.10		
Total	249,434			4	±0
Valid votes	249,434	99.28	±0.00		
Invalid votes	1,809	0.72	±0.00		
Votes cast / turnout	251,243	72.31	+4.58		
Abstentions	96,190	27.69	–4.58		
Registered voters	347,433				

=== 2000 ===
Summary of the 12 March 2000 Congress of Deputies election results in Lugo
Parties and alliances	Popular vote			Seats	
Parties and alliances	Votes	%	±pp	Total	+/−
People's Party (PP)	134,168	57.97	+4.50	3	±0
Socialists' Party of Galicia–Progressives (PSdeG–PSOE–p)	53,028	22.91	–9.57	1	±0
Galician Nationalist Bloc (BNG)	37,422	16.17	+6.21	0	±0
United Left (EU–IU)	2,297	0.99	–1.61	0	±0
Galician Coalition (CG)	351	0.15	New	0	±0
Party of Self-employed and Professionals (AUTONOMO)	298	0.13	New	0	±0
Centrist Union–Democratic and Social Centre (UC–CDS)	291	0.13	–0.09	0	±0
Galician Democracy (DG)	238	0.10	New	0	±0
Natural Law Party (PLN)	185	0.08	New	0	±0
Spain 2000 Platform (ES2000)	181	0.08	New	0	±0
Galician People's Front (FPG)	161	0.07	–0.03	0	±0
Humanist Party (PH)	157	0.07	+0.03	0	±0
The Phalanx (FE)	118	0.05	New	0	±0
Spanish Democratic Party (PADE)	61	0.03	New	0	±0
Blank ballots	2,506	1.08	+0.32		
Total	231,462			4	±0
Valid votes	231,462	99.28	–0.15		
Invalid votes	1,683	0.72	+0.15		
Votes cast / turnout	233,145	67.73	–4.34		
Abstentions	111,096	32.27	+4.34		
Registered voters	344,241				

=== 1996 ===
Summary of the 3 March 1996 Congress of Deputies election results in Lugo
Parties and alliances	Popular vote			Seats	
Parties and alliances	Votes	%	±pp	Total	+/−
People's Party (PP)	129,523	53.47	+0.29	3	±0
Socialists' Party of Galicia (PSdeG–PSOE)	78,692	32.48	+0.28	1	–1
Galician Nationalist Bloc (BNG)	24,136	9.96	+2.78	0	±0
United Left–Galician Left (EU–EG)	6,292	2.60	–0.12	0	±0
The Greens of Galicia (Os Verdes)	857	0.35	–0.06	0	±0
Centrist Union (UC)	439	0.18	–1.08	0	±0
Galician People's Front (FPG)	250	0.10	New	0	±0
Authentic Spanish Phalanx (FEA)	121	0.05	New	0	±0
Humanist Party (PH)	108	0.04	–0.01	0	±0
Blank ballots	1,838	0.76	–0.02		
Total	242,256			4	–1
Valid votes	242,256	99.43	+0.15		
Invalid votes	1,396	0.57	–0.15		
Votes cast / turnout	243,652	72.07	+2.21		
Abstentions	94,447	27.93	–2.21		
Registered voters	338,099				

=== 1993 ===
Summary of the 6 June 1993 Congress of Deputies election results in Lugo
Parties and alliances	Popular vote			Seats	
Parties and alliances	Votes	%	±pp	Total	+/−
People's Party (PP)	120,130	53.18	+7.42	3	±0
Socialists' Party of Galicia (PSdeG–PSOE)	72,745	32.20	+0.79	2	±0
Galician Nationalist Bloc (BNG)	16,226	7.18	+4.38	0	±0
Galician Unity–United Left (UG–EU)	6,155	2.72	+0.74	0	±0
Galician Nationalist Convergence (CNG)	3,306	1.46	New	0	±0
Democratic and Social Centre (CDS)	2,842	1.26	–4.87	0	±0
The Greens (Os Verdes)^{1}	937	0.41	–0.48	0	±0
The Ecologists (LE)	508	0.22	New	0	±0
Ruiz-Mateos Group (ARM)	310	0.14	–0.36	0	±0
Communist Party of the Galician People (PCPG)	250	0.11	+0.03	0	±0
Galician Alternative (AG)	248	0.11	New	0	±0
Coalition for a New Socialist Party (CNPS)^{2}	159	0.07	–0.01	0	±0
Party of El Bierzo (PB)	108	0.05	New	0	±0
Humanist Party (PH)	107	0.05	–0.05	0	±0
Natural Law Party (PLN)	98	0.04	New	0	±0
Communist Unification of Spain (UCE)	0	0.00	New	0	±0
Blank ballots	1,766	0.78	+0.10		
Total	225,895			5	±0
Valid votes	225,895	99.28	–0.03		
Invalid votes	1,628	0.72	+0.03		
Votes cast / turnout	227,523	69.86	+9.08		
Abstentions	98,151	30.14	–9.08		
Registered voters	325,674				
Sources
Footnotes: ^{1} The Greens results are compared to The Greens–Green List totals in the 1989 election.; ^{2} Coalition for a New Socialist Party results are compared to Alliance for the Republic totals in the 1989 election.

=== 1989 ===
Summary of the 29 October 1989 Congress of Deputies election results in Lugo
Parties and alliances	Popular vote			Seats	
Parties and alliances	Votes	%	±pp	Total	+/−
People's Party (PP)^{1}	92,374	45.76	–1.01	3	±0
Socialists' Party of Galicia (PSdeG–PSOE)	63,404	31.41	+1.77	2	±0
Galician Coalition (CG)	14,040	6.96	–3.62	0	±0
Democratic and Social Centre (CDS)	12,371	6.13	–0.35	0	±0
Galician Nationalist Bloc (BNG)	5,650	2.80	+1.53	0	±0
United Left (EU)	3,999	1.98	+1.24	0	±0
Galician Socialist Party–Galician Left (PSG–EG)	2,582	1.28	–0.36	0	±0
The Greens–Green List (LV–LV)	1,790	0.89	New	0	±0
Galician Nationalist Party–Galicianist Party (PNG–PG)	1,223	0.61	New	0	±0
Ruiz-Mateos Group (Ruiz-Mateos)	1,017	0.50	New	0	±0
Workers' Socialist Party (PST)	509	0.25	–0.16	0	±0
Workers' Party of Spain–Communist Unity (PTE–UC)^{2}	372	0.18	–0.38	0	±0
Humanist Party (PH)	210	0.10	New	0	±0
Revolutionary Workers' Party of Spain (PORE)	198	0.10	New	0	±0
Galician People's Front (FPG)	195	0.10	New	0	±0
Alliance for the Republic (AxR)	160	0.08	New	0	±0
Communist Party of the Galician People (PCPG)	157	0.08	New	0	±0
Spanish Phalanx of the CNSO (FE–JONS)	138	0.07	–0.06	0	±0
Asturianist Party (PAS)	86	0.04	New	0	±0
Blank ballots	1,382	0.68	+0.10		
Total	201,857			5	±0
Valid votes	201,857	99.31	+0.86		
Invalid votes	1,396	0.69	–0.86		
Votes cast / turnout	203,253	60.78	+4.36		
Abstentions	131,181	39.22	–4.36		
Registered voters	334,434				
Sources
Footnotes: ^{1} People's Party results are compared to People's Coalition totals in the 1986 election.; ^{2} Workers' Party of Spain–Communist Unity results are compared to Communists' Unity Board totals in the 1986 election.

=== 1986 ===
Summary of the 22 June 1986 Congress of Deputies election results in Lugo
Parties and alliances	Popular vote			Seats	
Parties and alliances	Votes	%	±pp	Total	+/−
People's Coalition (AP–PDP–PL)^{1}	88,162	46.77	+0.60	3	±0
Socialists' Party of Galicia (PSdG–PSOE)	55,860	29.64	+1.84	2	+1
Galician Coalition (CG)	19,944	10.58	New	0	±0
Democratic and Social Centre (CDS)	12,210	6.48	+4.46	0	±0
Galician Nationalist Bloc (BNG)	3,310	1.76	–1.31	0	±0
Galician Socialist Party–Galician Left (PSG–EG)^{2}	3,088	1.64	+1.15	0	±0
Galicianist and United Left Platform (PG–EU)^{3}	1,398	0.74	+0.01	0	±0
Communists' Unity Board (MUC)	1,059	0.56	New	0	±0
Workers' Socialist Party (PST)	774	0.41	–0.13	0	±0
Communist Unification of Spain (UCE)	496	0.26	+0.13	0	±0
Party of the Communists of Catalonia (PCC)	323	0.17	New	0	±0
Republican Popular Unity (UPR)^{4}	277	0.15	+0.04	0	±0
Spanish Phalanx of the CNSO (FE–JONS)	252	0.13	New	0	±0
National Unity Coalition (CUN)	245	0.13	New	0	±0
Union of the Democratic Centre (UCD)	n/a	n/a	–18.04	0	–1
Blank ballots	1,084	0.58	–0.04		
Total	188,482			5	±0
Valid votes	188,482	98.45	+0.02		
Invalid votes	2,976	1.55	–0.02		
Votes cast / turnout	191,458	56.42	–4.41		
Abstentions	147,893	43.58	+4.41		
Registered voters	339,351				
Sources
Footnotes: ^{1} People's Coalition results are compared to People's Alliance–People's Democratic Party totals in the 1982 election.; ^{2} Galician Socialist Party–Galician Left results are compared to Galician Left totals in the 1982 election.; ^{3} Galicianist and United Left Platform results are compared to Communist Party of Galicia totals in the 1982 election.; ^{4} Republican Popular Unity results are compared to Communist Party of Spain (Marxist–Leninist) totals in the 1982 election.

=== 1982 ===
Summary of the 28 October 1982 Congress of Deputies election results in Lugo
Parties and alliances	Popular vote			Seats	
Parties and alliances	Votes	%	±pp	Total	+/−
People's Alliance–People's Democratic Party (AP–PDP)^{1}	88,462	46.17	+26.92	3	+2
Socialists' Party of Galicia (PSdG–PSOE)	53,263	27.80	+10.31	1	±0
Union of the Democratic Centre (UCD)	34,567	18.04	–32.06	1	–2
Galician Nationalist Bloc–Galician Socialist Party (B–PSG)^{2}	5,885	3.07	–6.16	0	±0
Democratic and Social Centre (CDS)	3,876	2.02	New	0	±0
Communist Party of Galicia (PCE–PCG)	1,391	0.73	–0.80	0	±0
Workers' Socialist Party (PST)	1,026	0.54	New	0	±0
Galician Left (EG)	948	0.49	New	0	±0
Spanish Solidarity (SE)	500	0.26	New	0	±0
Communist Unification of Spain (UCE)	256	0.13	New	0	±0
Communist Party of Spain (Marxist–Leninist) (PCE (m–l))	213	0.11	New	0	±0
Blank ballots	1,196	0.62	+0.31		
Total	191,583			5	±0
Valid votes	191,583	98.43	–0.17		
Invalid votes	3,057	1.57	+0.17		
Votes cast / turnout	194,640	60.83	+11.57		
Abstentions	125,320	39.17	–11.57		
Registered voters	319,960				
Sources
Footnotes: ^{1} People's Alliance–People's Democratic Party results are compared to Democratic Coalition totals in the 1979 election.; ^{2} Galician Nationalist Bloc–Galician Socialist Party results are compared to the combined totals of the Galician National-Popular Bloc and Galician Unity in the 1979 election.

=== 1979 ===
Summary of the 1 March 1979 Congress of Deputies election results in Lugo
Parties and alliances	Popular vote			Seats	
Parties and alliances	Votes	%	±pp	Total	+/−
Union of the Democratic Centre (UCD)	79,964	50.10	–1.74	3	–1
Democratic Coalition (CD)^{1}	30,731	19.25	–2.41	1	±0
Spanish Socialist Workers' Party (PSOE)^{2}	27,920	17.49	–0.54	1	+1
Galician National-Popular Bloc (BNPG)	11,834	7.41	+5.08	0	±0
Galician Unity (PG–POG–PSG)^{3}	2,911	1.82	+0.58	0	±0
Communist Party of Spain (PCE)	2,441	1.53	–0.23	0	±0
National Union (UN)	816	0.51	New	0	±0
Republican Left (IR)	658	0.41	New	0	±0
Party of Labour of Spain (PTE)^{4}	407	0.25	–0.07	0	±0
Workers' Revolutionary Organization (ORT)	286	0.18	New	0	±0
Communist Movement of Galicia–Organization of Communist Left (MCG–OIC)	264	0.17	New	0	±0
Communist League (LC)	249	0.16	New	0	±0
Carlist Party (PC)	228	0.14	New	0	±0
Spanish Phalanx–Falangist Unity (FE–UF)	216	0.14	New	0	±0
Proverist Party (PPr)	195	0.12	New	0	±0
Blank ballots	500	0.31	–0.17		
Total	159,620			5	±0
Valid votes	159,620	98.60	+0.78		
Invalid votes	2,260	1.40	–0.78		
Votes cast / turnout	161,880	49.26	–7.53		
Abstentions	166,758	50.74	+7.53		
Registered voters	328,638				
Sources
Footnotes: ^{1} Democratic Coalition results are compared to People's Alliance totals in the 1977 election.; ^{2} Spanish Socialist Workers' Party results are compared to the combined totals of Spanish Socialist Workers' Party and People's Socialist Party–Socialist Unity in the 1977 election.; ^{3} Galician Unity results are compared to Galician Socialist Party totals in the 1977 election.; ^{4} Party of Labour of Spain results are compared to Democratic Left Front totals in the 1977 election.

=== 1977 ===
Summary of the 15 June 1977 Congress of Deputies election results in Lugo
Parties and alliances	Popular vote			Seats	
Parties and alliances	Votes	%	±pp	Total	+/−
Union of the Democratic Centre (UCD)	87,059	51.84	n/a	4	n/a
People's Alliance (AP)	36,377	21.66	n/a	1	n/a
Spanish Socialist Workers' Party (PSOE)	20,808	12.39	n/a	0	n/a
People's Socialist Party–Socialist Unity (PSP–US)	9,466	5.64	n/a	0	n/a
Galician National-Popular Bloc (BNPG)	3,909	2.33	n/a	0	n/a
Communist Party of Spain (PCE)	2,949	1.76	n/a	0	n/a
Spanish Social Reform (RSE)	2,852	1.70	n/a	0	n/a
Galician Socialist Party (PSG)	2,080	1.24	n/a	0	n/a
Front for Workers' Unity (FUT)	602	0.36	n/a	0	n/a
Democratic Left Front (FDI)	544	0.32	n/a	0	n/a
Spanish Phalanx of the CNSO (Authentic) (FE–JONS(A))	496	0.30	n/a	0	n/a
Blank ballots	802	0.48	n/a		
Total	167,944			5	n/a
Valid votes	167,944	97.82	n/a		
Invalid votes	3,737	2.18	n/a		
Votes cast / turnout	171,681	56.79	n/a		
Abstentions	130,612	43.21	n/a		
Registered voters	302,293				

== Bibliography ==
- Ley 1/1977, de 4 de enero, para la Reforma Política (Fundamental Law 1/1977). Official State Gazette (in Spanish). 4 January 1977. BOE-A-1977-165.
- Real Decreto-ley 20/1977, de 18 de marzo, sobre Normas Electorales (Royal Decree-Law 20/1977). Official State Gazette (in Spanish). 18 March 1977. BOE-A-1977-7445.
- Constitución Española (Constitution). Official State Gazette (in Spanish). 27 December 1978. BOE-A-1978-31229.
- Ley Orgánica 5/1985, de 19 de junio, del Régimen Electoral General (Organic Law 5/1985). Official State Gazette (in Spanish). 19 June 1985. BOE-A-1985-11672.
- Carreras de Odriozola, Albert; Tafunell Sambola, Xavier (2005) [1989]. Estadísticas históricas de España, siglos XIX-XX (PDF) (in Spanish). Vol. 1 (II ed.). Bilbao: Fundación BBVA. pp. 1072–1097. ISBN 84-96515-00-1. Archived from the original (PDF) on 24 September 2015.
