= Secretary of State for Relations with the Cortes =

Secretary of State for Relations with the Cortes and Constitutional Affairs
- Secretario de Estado de Relaciones con las Cortes y Asuntos Constitucionales
- Coat of Arms used by the Government

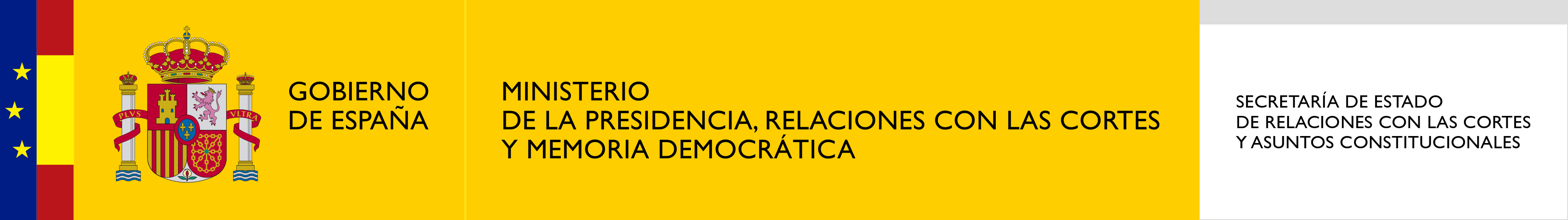

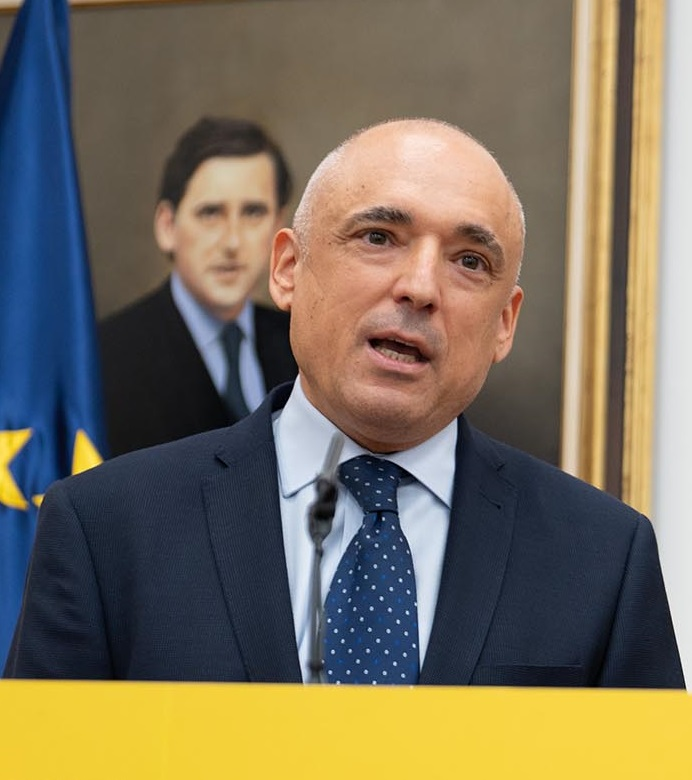
- Incumbent; Rafael Simancas since 21 July 2021
- Ministry of the Presidency
- Style: The Most Excellent (formal); Mr. Secretary of State (informal)
- Abbreviation: SERCAC
- Nominator: The Minister of the Presidency
- Appointer: The Monarch
- Precursor: Deputy Minister for Relations with the Cortes
- Formation: July 11, 1977; 49 years ago
- First holder: Rafael Arias-Salgado
- Website: mpr.gob.es

The secretary of state for relations with the Cortes and constitutional affairs (SERCAC) is a senior minister of the Spanish Ministry of the Presidency, Justice and Relations with the Cortes responsible for the relations between the executive and the legislative branches. The SERC is a political appointment made by the Monarch on the advice of the minister in charge of the ministerial department.

This position is normally integrated in the Ministry of the Presidency, although in some periods it had its own department. The secretary of state represents the Government in all the bodies of the Cortes Generales—the Spanish Parliament—which the Government consider important to go; is in charge for all the relations between the executive branch and both Congress and Senate with the exception of draft bills, Royal decree-laws or Royal legislative decrees whose negotiation and follow-up directly falls to the minister responsible.

It is also in charge of following the activity of the Parliament, advising the government members how to act before Parliament and make legal reports about constitutional amendments or other issues of high relevance. The Secretary of State for Relations with the Cortes is assisted by two departments, the Directorate-General for Relations with the Cortes and the Directorate-General for Constitutional Affairs and Legal Coordination.

== History ==
The raison d'être of this position was establishing proper relations between the Government and the Cortes Generales. After the approval of the Political Reform Law, Spain re-established a parliamentary system in which the Government is accountable to Parliament, unlike the dictatorship period when the legislative power was a mere facade and was subordinated to the executive branch.

This office was established in 1977 as Secretary-General for Relations with the Cortes, under the authority of the Deputy Minister for Relations with the Cortes—Ignacio Camuñas (1977—1979) and Rafael Arias-Salgado (1979—1980). The Deputy Minister was also responsible for other officials such as the Parliamentary Secretary for Relations with Congress and Senate, which would eventually evolve into the current directorate-general of the Secretariat of State.

In January 1980, the Minister of the Presidency assumed all the responsibilities of the Deputy Minister for Relations with the Cortes, and the Secretary-General remained the second-in-command in this area. The position of Parliamentary Secretary for Relations with Congress and Senate was renamed as Secretary for Relations with Congress and a new Secretary for Relations with the Senate was created, both of them with the rank of director-general.

In March 1981, the position was promoted to the rank of secretary of state, and the two directorates-general were functionally reorganized, rather than each focusing on a specific legislative chamber. Thus, one of the secretariats became responsible for legislative activity, while the other handled parliamentary oversight to the government.

A new reform in December 1982 renamed the position as Secretary of State for Relations with the Cortes and Legislative Coordination and its directorates-general were renamed as Directorate-General for Relations with the Congress of Deputies and Directorate-General for Relations with the Senate, respectively.

From 1986 to 1993, the position was abolished and its powers were directly exercised by the Minister for Relations with the Cortes and the Government Secretariat—the new name for the Minister of the Presidency—. Also, during this period, the aforementioned directorates-general were merged into a single Directorate-General for Relations with the Cortes and a new Directorate-General for the Monitoring of Parliamentary Initiatives was established, responsible for the review and processing of interpellations, questions, non-legislative motions, and other parliamentary oversight actions.

In September 1993 the position of Secretary-General for Relations with the Cortes was re-established with the two original directorates for relations with both chambers. In May 1996, it was once more elevated to the rank of secretary of state and its two directorates merged into one.

From April 2008 to December 2011, it was renamed as Secretary of State for Constitutional and Parliamentary Affairs and, in addition to the Directorate-General for Relations with the Cortes, it also included a Directorate-General for Legal Coordination. In late 2011, the 1996 name and organization was re-established.

Another relevant change happened in 2020 when it was renamed Secretary of State for Relations with the Cortes and Constitutional Affairs. This change of name did not mean an extension of powers, but only that its responsibilities were divided between the already existing Directorate-General for Relations with the Cortes and the re-established Directorate-General for Constitutional Affairs and Legal Coordination.

In 2024, it assumed responsibility for the promotion of human rights, a role previously held by the Secretary of State for Justice.

== Organization ==
The Secretariat of State, which the secretary of state leads, is structured as follows:

- The Directorate-General for Relations with the Cortes.
  - The Deputy Directorate-General for Legislative Coordination.
  - The Deputy Directorate-General for Parliamentary Initiatives.
  - The Deputy Directorate-General for Written Control.
  - The Deputy Directorate-General for Parliamentary Documentation.
- The Directorate-General for Constitutional Affairs and Legal Coordination.
  - The Deputy Directorate-General for Constitutional Regime.
- The Cabinet.
  - The Chief of Staff.
  - Three Advisors.

== List of secretaries of state ==
For the purpose of this list, the date used is the date on which the decree of appointment or dismissal received royal assent, which may differ from the date of publication or of the effective taking of office.

| Name | Term | | | Government | | Ref. |
| Name | Start | End | Duration | Prime Minister | Monarch | Ref. |
|---|---|---|---|---|---|---|
| Rafael Arias-Salgado (born 1942) | 11 July 1977 | 5 January 1979 | 1 year, 178 days | The Duke of Suárez (1976–1981) | Juan Carlos I (1975–2014) | |
| Javier Moscoso (1934–2025) | 21 April 1979 | 25 January 1980 | 279 days | The Duke of Suárez (1976–1981) | Juan Carlos I (1975–2014) | |
| Gabriel Cisneros (1940–2007) | 25 January 1980 | 3 September 1982 | 2 years, 221 days | The Duke of Suárez (1976–1981) | Juan Carlos I (1975–2014) | |
| Gabriel Cisneros (1940–2007) | 25 January 1980 | 3 September 1982 | 2 years, 221 days | The Marquess of Ría de Ribadeo (1981–1982) | Juan Carlos I (1975–2014) | |
| Virgilio Zapatero (born 1946) | 7 December 1982 | 25 July 1986 | 3 years, 230 days | Felipe González (1982–1996) | Juan Carlos I (1975–2014) | |
| Position abolished during this interval. | | | | Felipe González (1982–1996) | Juan Carlos I (1975–2014) | |
| Enrique Guerrero Salom (born 1948) | 3 September 1993 | 7 May 1996 | 2 years, 247 days | Felipe González (1982–1996) | Juan Carlos I (1975–2014) | |
| José María Michavila (born 1960) | 7 May 1996 | 5 May 2000 | 3 years, 364 days | José María Aznar (1996–2004) | Juan Carlos I (1975–2014) | |
| Jorge Fernández Díaz (born 1950) | 5 May 2000 | 19 April 2004 | 3 years, 350 days | José María Aznar (1996–2004) | Juan Carlos I (1975–2014) | |
| Francisco Caamaño Domínguez (born 1963) | 19 April 2004 | 27 February 2009 | 4 years, 314 days | José Luis Rodríguez Zapatero (2004–2011) | Juan Carlos I (1975–2014) | |
| José Luis de Francisco Herrero (1963–2022) | 6 March 2009 | 23 December 2011 | 2 years, 292 days | José Luis Rodríguez Zapatero (2004–2011) | Juan Carlos I (1975–2014) | |
| José Luis Ayllón (born 1970) | 23 December 2011 | 26 January 2018 | 6 years, 34 days | Mariano Rajoy (2011–2018) | Juan Carlos I (1975–2014) | |
| José Luis Ayllón (born 1970) | 23 December 2011 | 26 January 2018 | 6 years, 34 days | Mariano Rajoy (2011–2018) | Felipe VI (2014–present) | |
| Rubén Moreno Palanques (born 1958) | 2 February 2018 | 8 June 2018 | 126 days | Mariano Rajoy (2011–2018) | Felipe VI (2014–present) | |
| José Antonio Montilla Martos (born 1966) | 8 June 2018 | 20 July 2021 | 3 years, 42 days | Pedro Sánchez (2018–) | Felipe VI (2014–present) | |
| Rafael Simancas (born 1966) | 20 July 2021 | Incumbent | 5 years, 62 days | Pedro Sánchez (2018–) | Felipe VI (2014–present) | |
