= List of female ministers of Spain =

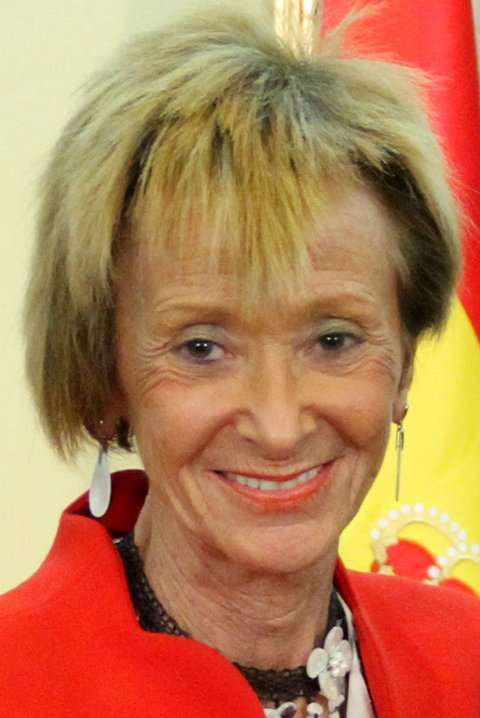
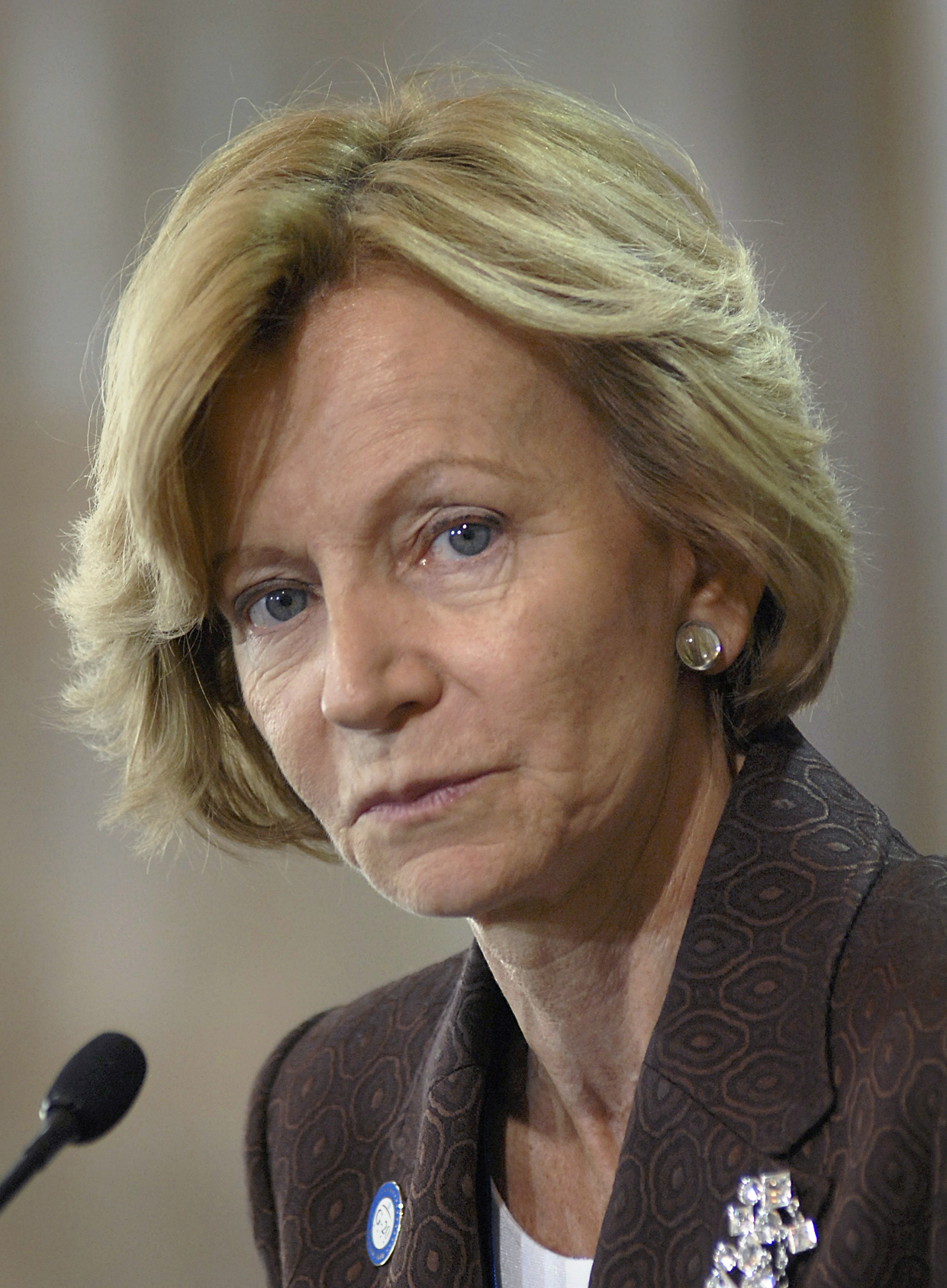
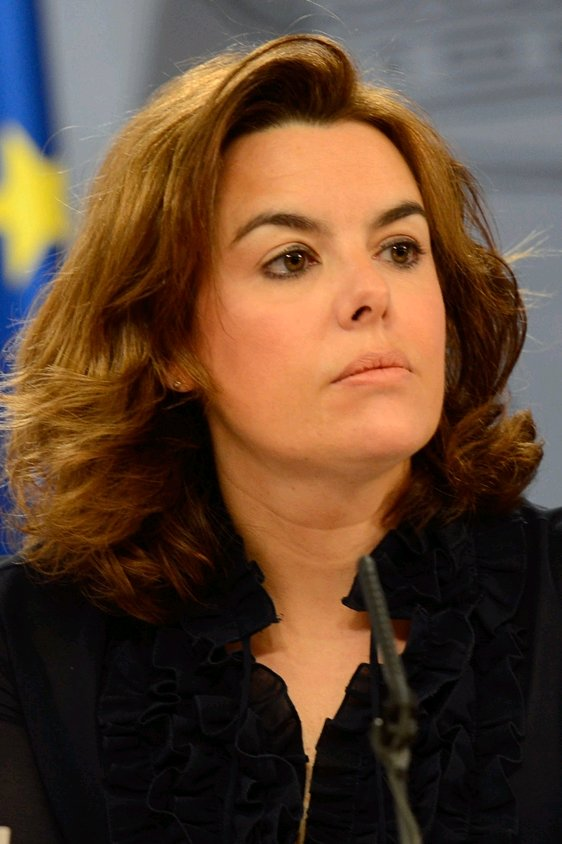
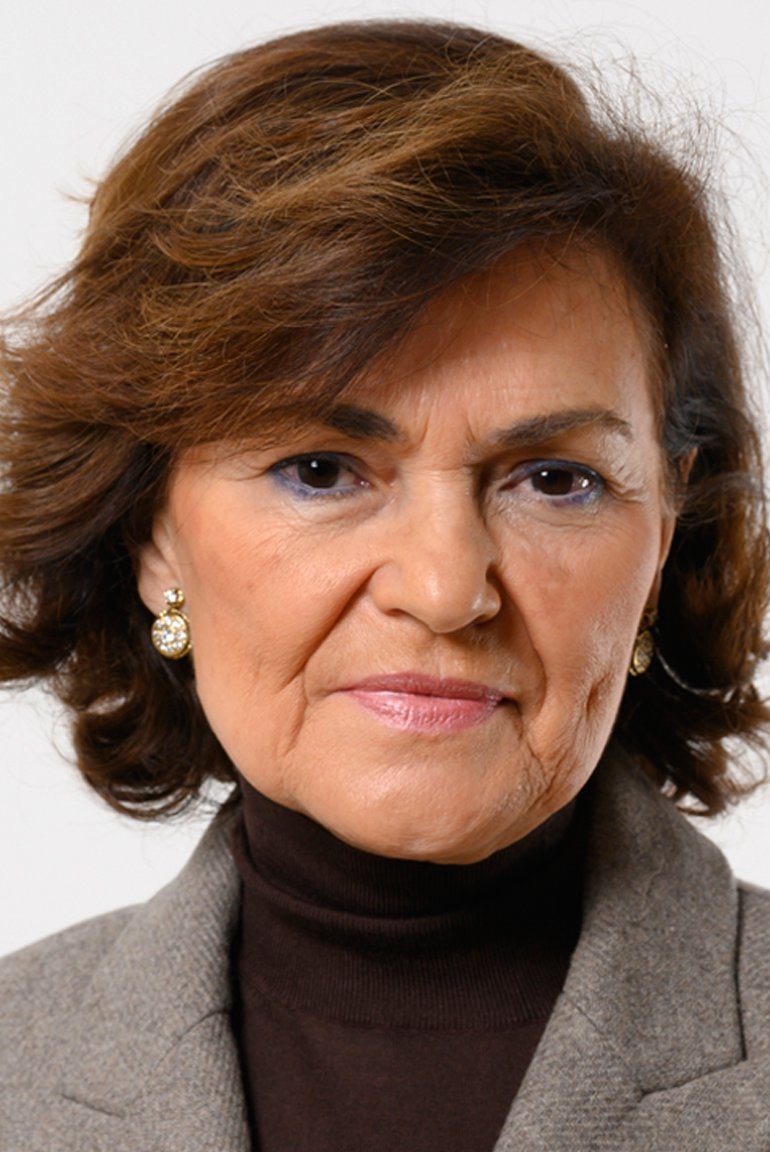
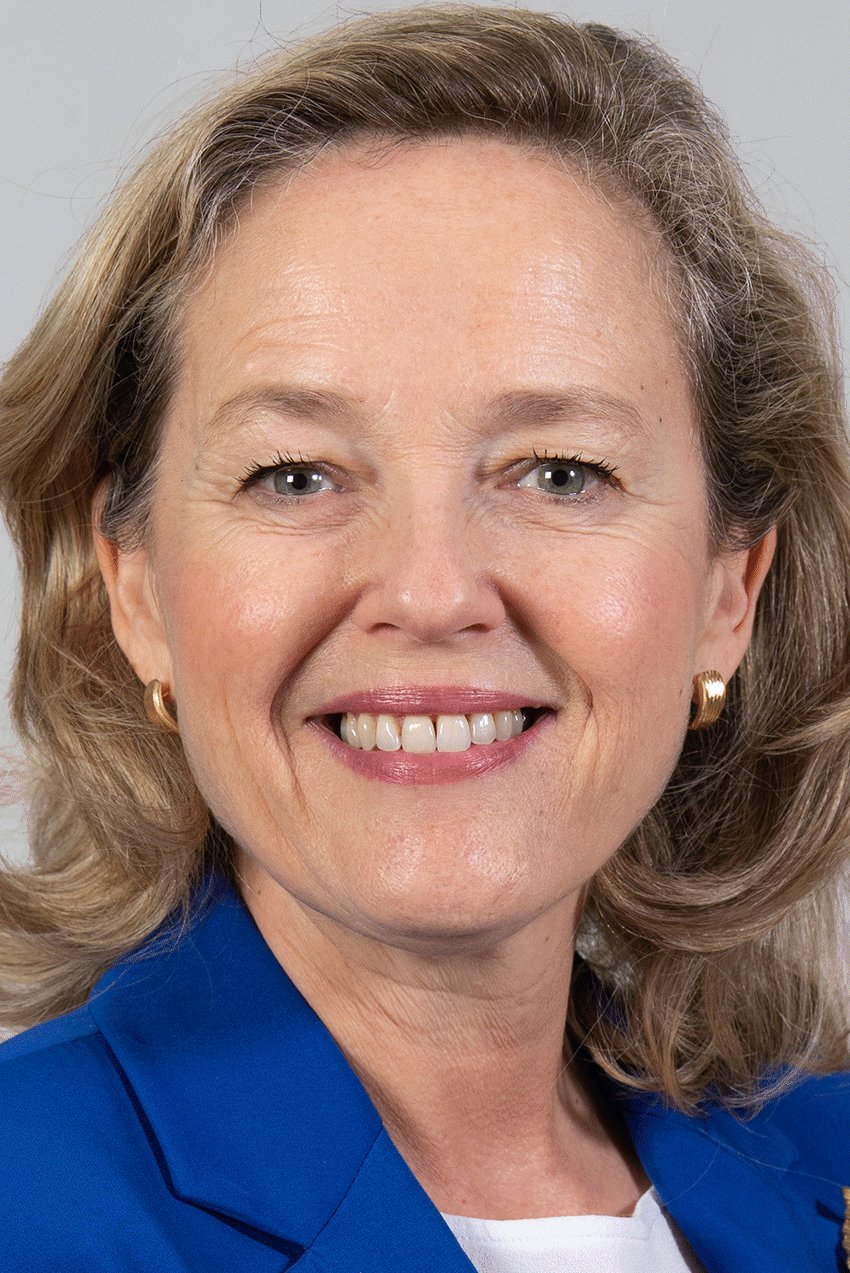
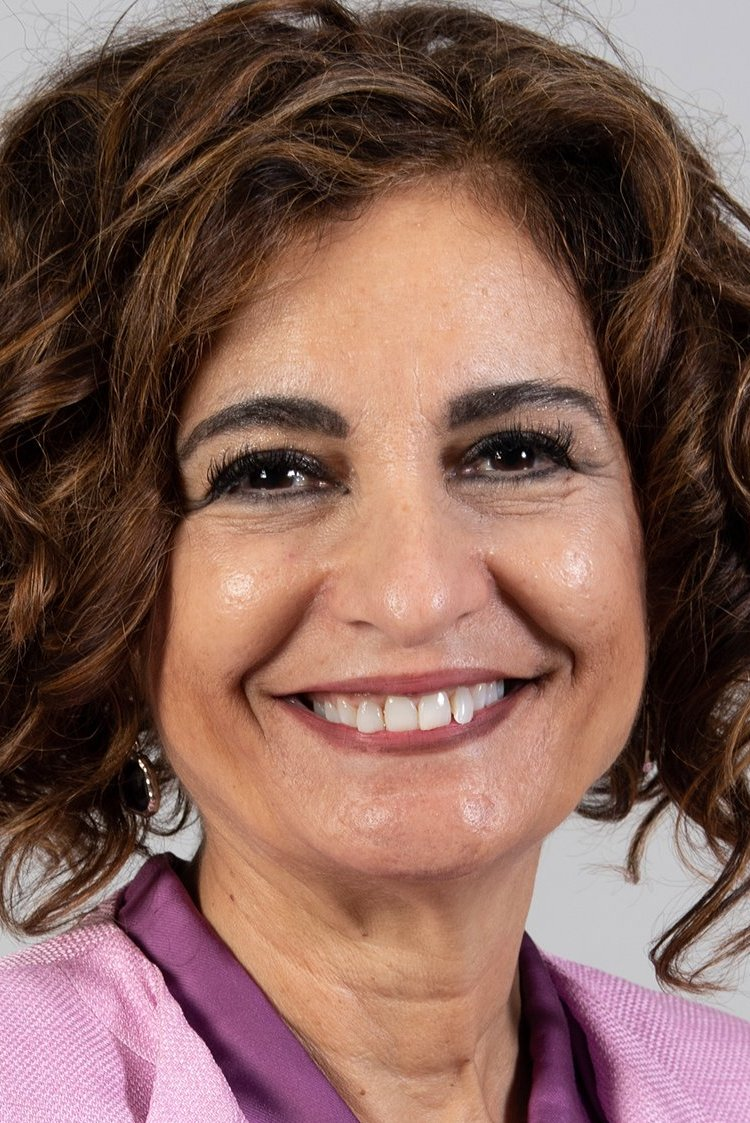
María Teresa Fernández de la Vega, Elena Salgado, Soraya Sáenz de Santamaría, Carmen Calvo, Nadia Calviño and María Jesús Montero are the women that have been deputy prime minister of Spain, highest-ranking position held by a woman in Spain to date. From 2011 to March 2026, all deputy prime ministers of Spain were female.

The Spanish government has had 61 women as ministers throughout history. Only one woman, Federica Montseny, has held the post of minister before the current democratic period, becoming one of the first female ministers in the whole Europe. The second government of José Luis Rodríguez Zapatero (PSOE) was the first to achieve full equality, with the same number of male and female ministers. The second government of Pedro Sánchez holds the record for the biggest amount of female ministers, with 14, whilst his first government became the first one to have more women than men.

Equality Minister Bibiana Aído was the youngest female minister to be elected for a ministry at the age of 31, whilst Education minister Isabel Celaá was the oldest female minister to be elected for a ministry, at the age of 69. Health minister Carmen Montón is the shortest-serving female minister at 97 days, whilst current Defence minister Margarita Robles is the longest-serving female minister.

== Political party table ==
Party	Numbers of ministers (total)
National Confederation of Labour	1
Union of the Democratic Centre	1
Spanish Socialist Workers' Party	36
People's Party	16
Communist Party of Spain	2
Unidas Podemos	2
Más Madrid	1
Independent	8

== Female ministers ==
=== Second Spanish Republic ===
Minister		Ministry	Tenure		Party	Prime Minister
Federica Montseny (1936-1939)	Federica Montseny	Ministry of Health and Social Policy	4 November 1936	17 May 1937	CNT	Francisco Largo Caballero

=== Current democratic period (since 1978) ===
refers to the first woman in that specific ministry.
refers to current ministers of the Government.

Minister		Ministry	Tenure			Party	Prime Minister
Minister		Ministry	Start	End	Length	Party	Prime Minister
Soledad Becerril 1998 (cropped)	Soledad Becerril	Ministry of Culture	2 December 1981	3 December 1982	2 years and 1 day	UCD	Leopoldo Calvo-Sotelo
Rosa Conde, compadece en la rueda de prensa posterior al Consejo de Ministros (cropped)	Rosa Conde	Spokesperson of the Government	7 July 1988	14 July 1993	5 years and 7 days	PSOE	Felipe González
Matilde Fernández 2007 (cropped)	Matilde Fernández	Ministry of Social Affairs	7 July 1988	14 July 1993	5 years and 7 days	PSOE	Felipe González
	Ángeles Amador	Ministry of Health and Consumer Affairs	14 July 1993	6 May 1996	2 years and 297 days	Independent	Felipe González
Carmen Alborch (cropped 2)	Carmen Alborch	Ministry of Culture	14 July 1993	4 May 1996	2 years and 295 days	PSOE	Felipe González
Cristina Alberdi 2016 (cropped)	Cristina Alberdi	Ministry of Social Affairs	13 July 1993	5 May 1996	2 years and 297 days	PSOE	Felipe González
Margarita Mariscal de Gante 1996 (cropped)	Margarita Mariscal de Gante	Ministry of Justice	6 May 1996	28 April 2000	3 years and 358 days	PP	José María Aznar
Loyola de Palacio 1996 (cropped)	Loyola de Palacio	Ministry of Agriculture and Fisheries	6 May 1996	30 April 1999	2 years and 359 days	PP	José María Aznar
Esperanza Aguirre 2007 (cropped)	Esperanza Aguirre	Ministry of Education, Culture and Sports	5 May 1996	19 January 1999	2 years and 259 days	PP	José María Aznar
Isabel Tocino 1996 (cropped)	Isabel Tocino	Ministry of the Environment	6 May 1996	27 April 2000	3 years and 357 days	PP	José María Aznar
Pilar del Castillo 2001b (cropped)	Pilar del Castillo	Ministry of Education, Culture and Sport	27 April 2000	18 April 2004	3 years and 357 days	PP	José María Aznar
Anna Birulés 2002 (cropped)	Anna Birulés	Ministry of Science and Technology	28 April 2000	10 July 2002	2 years and 73 days	Independent	José María Aznar
Celia Villalobos 2001b (cropped)	Celia Villalobos	Ministry of Health, Social Services and Equality	27 April 2000	10 July 2002	2 years and 74 days	PP	José María Aznar
Ana Pastor Julián 2016 (cropped)	Ana Pastor	Ministry of Health, Social Services and Equality	10 July 2002	18 April 2004	1 year and 283 days	PP	José María Aznar
Ana Pastor Julián 2016 (cropped)	Ana Pastor	Ministry of Development	22 December 2011	19 July 2016	4 years and 210 days	PP	Mariano Rajoy
Ana Palacio 2004 (cropped)	Ana Palacio	Ministry of Foreign Affairs	20 July 2002	18 April 2004	1 year and 273 days	PP	José María Aznar
Julia García-Valdecasas 2005 (cropped)	Julia García-Valdecasas	Ministry of Public Administration	3 September 2003	18 April 2004	228 days	PP	José María Aznar
Elvira Rodríguez 2003 (cropped)	Elvira Rodríguez	Ministry of the Environment	28 February 2003	18 April 2004	1 year and 50 days	PP	José María Aznar
De la Vega2 cropped	María Teresa Fernández de la Vega	First Deputy Prime Minister	18 April 2004	21 October 2010	6 years and 186 days	PSOE	José Luis Rodríguez Zapatero
De la Vega2 cropped	María Teresa Fernández de la Vega	Ministry of the Presidency	18 April 2004	21 October 2010	6 years and 186 days	PSOE	José Luis Rodríguez Zapatero
María Jesús San Segundo	Mª Jesús San Segundo	Ministry of Education and Science	18 April 2004	11 April 2006	1 year and 358 days	PSOE	José Luis Rodríguez Zapatero
Magdalena Álvarez 2011 (cropped)	Magdalena Álvarez	Ministry of Development	28 April 2004	7 April 2009	4 years and 344 days	PSOE	José Luis Rodríguez Zapatero
Elena Espinosa 2009 (cropped)	Elena Espinosa	Ministry of Agriculture, Fisheries and Food	18 April 2004	13 April 2008	3 years and 361 days	PSOE	José Luis Rodríguez Zapatero
Elena Espinosa 2009 (cropped)	Elena Espinosa	Minister of Rural and Marine Environment	14 April 2008	20 October 2010	2 years and 189 days	PSOE	José Luis Rodríguez Zapatero
Cristina Narbona 2007 (cropped)	Cristina Narbona	Ministry of the Environment	18 April 2004	14 April 2008	3 years and 362 days	PSOE	José Luis Rodríguez Zapatero
Carmen Calvo 2020 (portrait)	Carmen Calvo	Ministry of Culture	18 April 2004	9 July 2007	3 years and 82 days	PSOE	José Luis Rodríguez Zapatero
Carmen Calvo 2020 (portrait)	Carmen Calvo	First Deputy Prime Minister	7 June 2018	12 July 2021	3 years and 35 days	PSOE	Pedro Sánchez
Carmen Calvo 2020 (portrait)	Carmen Calvo	Ministry of the Presidency, Relations with the Cortes and Equality	7 June 2018	13 January 2020	1 year and 220 days	PSOE	Pedro Sánchez
Carmen Calvo 2020 (portrait)	Carmen Calvo	Ministry of the Presidency, Relations with the Cortes and Democratic Memory	13 January 2020	12 July 2021	1 year and 180 days	PSOE	Pedro Sánchez
Elena Salgado 2010 (cropped)	Elena Salgado	Ministry of Health	18 April 2004	9 July 2007	3 years and 82 days	PSOE	José Luis Rodríguez Zapatero
Elena Salgado 2010 (cropped)	Elena Salgado	Ministry of Public Administrations	9 July 2007	7 April 2009	1 year and 272 days	PSOE	José Luis Rodríguez Zapatero
Elena Salgado 2010 (cropped)	Elena Salgado	Second Deputy Prime Minister	7 April 2009	11 July 2011	2 years and 95 days	PSOE	José Luis Rodríguez Zapatero
Elena Salgado 2010 (cropped)	Elena Salgado	Ministry of Economy and Finance	7 April 2009	21 December 2011	2 years and 258 days	PSOE	José Luis Rodríguez Zapatero
Elena Salgado 2010 (cropped)	Elena Salgado	First Deputy Prime Minister	11 July 2011	21 December 2011	163 days	PSOE	José Luis Rodríguez Zapatero
María Antonia Trujillo 2004 (cropped)	María Antonia Trujillo	Ministry of Housing	18 April 2004	9 July 2007	3 years and 82 days	PSOE	José Luis Rodríguez Zapatero
Carme Chacón 2010 (cropped)	Carme Chacón	Ministry of Housing	9 July 2007	11 April 2008	277 days	PSC	José Luis Rodríguez Zapatero
Carme Chacón 2010 (cropped)	Carme Chacón	Ministry of Defence	14 April 2008	22 December 2011	3 years and 252 days	PSC	José Luis Rodríguez Zapatero
Mercedes Cabrera 2007 (cropped)	Mercedes Cabrera	Ministry of Education and Science	11 April 2006	14 April 2008	2 years and 3 days	PSOE	José Luis Rodríguez Zapatero
Mercedes Cabrera 2007 (cropped)	Mercedes Cabrera	Ministry of Education, Social Policy and Sports	14 April 2008	7 April 2009	358 days	PSOE	José Luis Rodríguez Zapatero
Cristina Garmendia 2010 (cropped)	Cristina Garmendia	Ministry of Science and Innovation	14 April 2008	22 December 2011	3 years and 252 days	Independent	José Luis Rodríguez Zapatero
Beatriz Corredor 2010 (cropped)	Beatriz Corredor	Ministry of Housing	14 April 2008	20 October 2010	2 years and 250 days	PSOE	José Luis Rodríguez Zapatero
Bibiana Aído 2010 (cropped)	Bibiana Aído	Ministry of Equality	14 April 2008	20 October 2010	2 years and 250 days	PSOE	José Luis Rodríguez Zapatero
Ángeles González-Sinde 2011 (cropped)	Ángeles González-Sinde	Ministry of Culture	7 April 2009	22 December 2011	2 years and 259 days	PSOE	José Luis Rodríguez Zapatero
Trinidad Jiménez 2	Trinidad Jiménez	Ministry of Health and Social Policy	7 April 2009	21 October 2010	1 year and 197 days	PSOE	José Luis Rodríguez Zapatero
Trinidad Jiménez 2	Trinidad Jiménez	Ministry of Foreign Affairs and Cooperation	21 October 2010	22 December 2011	1 year and 62 days	PSOE	José Luis Rodríguez Zapatero
Rosa Aguilar 2015 (cropped)	Rosa Aguilar	Minister of Rural and Marine Environment	21 October 2010	22 December 2011	1 year and 62 days	PSOE	José Luis Rodríguez Zapatero
Soraya Sáenz de Santamaría 2017 (cropped)	Soraya Sáenz de Santamaría	Spokesperson of the Government	21 December 2011	3 November 2016	4 years and 318 days	PP	Mariano Rajoy
Soraya Sáenz de Santamaría 2017 (cropped)	Soraya Sáenz de Santamaría	First Deputy Prime Minister	21 December 2011	7 June 2018	6 years and 168 days	PP	Mariano Rajoy
Soraya Sáenz de Santamaría 2017 (cropped)	Soraya Sáenz de Santamaría	Ministry of the Presidency	21 December 2011	7 June 2018	6 years and 168 days	PP	Mariano Rajoy
Soraya Sáenz de Santamaría 2017 (cropped)	Soraya Sáenz de Santamaría	Ministry of Territorial Administrations	3 November 2016	7 June 2018	1 year and 216 days	PP	Mariano Rajoy
Fátima Báñez 2017b (cropped)	Fátima Báñez	Ministry of Employment and Social Security	22 December 2011	1 June 2018	6 years and 162 days	PP	Mariano Rajoy
Ana Mato 2012 (cropped)	Ana Mato	Ministry of Health, Social Services and Equality	22 December 2011	26 November 2014	2 years and 340 days	PP	Mariano Rajoy
Isabel García Tejerina 2017b (cropped)	Isabel García Tejerina	Ministry of Agriculture, Fishers, Food and Environment	28 April 2014	1 June 2018	4 years and 34 days	PP	Mariano Rajoy
María Dolores de Cospedal 2017 (cropped)	María Dolores de Cospedal	Ministry of Defence	4 November 2016	1 June 2018	1 year and 209 days	PP	Mariano Rajoy
Dolors Montserrat 2018 (cropped)	Dolors Montserrat	Minister of Health, Social Services and Equality	4 November 2016	1 June 2018	1 year and 209 days	PP	Mariano Rajoy
Margarita Robles 2020 (cropped)	Margarita Robles	Ministry of Defence	7 June 2018	Incumbent	8 years and 135 days	Independent	Pedro Sánchez
Dolores Delgado FIBGAR (cropped)	Dolores Delgado	Ministry of Justice	7 June 2018	13 January 2020	1 year and 220 days	Independent	Pedro Sánchez
María Jesús Montero 2020 (cropped)	María Jesús Montero	Ministry of Finance	7 June 2018	12 June 2021	3 years and 5 days	PSOE	Pedro Sánchez
María Jesús Montero 2020 (cropped)	María Jesús Montero	Ministry of Finance	29 December 2023	27 March 2026	2 years and 88 days	PSOE	Pedro Sánchez
María Jesús Montero 2020 (cropped)	María Jesús Montero	Spokesperson of the Government	13 January 2020	12 June 2021	1 year and 150 days	PSOE	Pedro Sánchez
María Jesús Montero 2020 (cropped)	María Jesús Montero	Ministry of Finance and Civil Service	12 June 2021	29 December 2023	2 years and 200 days	PSOE	Pedro Sánchez
María Jesús Montero 2020 (cropped)	María Jesús Montero	Fourth Deputy Prime Minister	21 November 2023	29 December 2023	38 days	PSOE	Pedro Sánchez
María Jesús Montero 2020 (cropped)	María Jesús Montero	First Deputy Prime Minister	29 December 2023	27 March 2026	2 years and 88 days	PSOE	Pedro Sánchez
Magdalena Valerio (cropped)	Magdalena Valerio	Minister of Labour, Migration and Social Security	7 June 2018	13 January 2020	1 year and 220 days	PSOE	Pedro Sánchez
Isabel Celaá 2020b (cropped)	Isabel Celaá	Spokesperson of the Government	7 June 2018	13 January 2020	1 year and 220 days	PSOE	Pedro Sánchez
Isabel Celaá 2020b (cropped)	Isabel Celaá	Ministry of Education and Vocational Training	7 June 2018	12 July 2021	3 years and 35 days	PSOE	Pedro Sánchez
Meritxell Batet 2018 (cropped)	Meritxell Batet	Ministry of Territorial Policy and Civil Service	7 June 2018	20 May 2019	347 days	PSC	Pedro Sánchez
Reyes Maroto 2020 (cropped)	Reyes Maroto	Ministry of Industry, Trade and Tourism	7 June 2018	28 March 2023	4 years and 294 days	PSOE	Pedro Sánchez
Carmen Montón 2018 (cropped)	Carmen Montón	Ministry of Health, Consumer Affairs and Social Welfare	7 June 2018	12 September 2018	97 days	PSOE	Pedro Sánchez
María Luisa Carcedo 2019 (cropped)	María Luisa Carcedo	Ministry of Health, Consumer Affairs and Social Welfare	12 September 2018	13 January 2020	1 year and 123 days	PSOE	Pedro Sánchez
Nadia Calviño 2020 (cropped)	Nadia Calviño	Ministry of Economy and Business	7 June 2018	13 January 2020	1 year and 220 days	Independent	Pedro Sánchez
Nadia Calviño 2020 (cropped)	Nadia Calviño	Third Deputy Prime Minister	13 January 2020	31 March 2021	1 year and 77 days	Independent	Pedro Sánchez
Nadia Calviño 2020 (cropped)	Nadia Calviño	Ministry of Economic Affairs and Digital Transformation	13 January 2020	21 November 2023	3 years and 312 days	Independent	Pedro Sánchez
Nadia Calviño 2020 (cropped)	Nadia Calviño	Second Deputy Prime Minister	31 March 2021	12 July 2021	103 days	Independent	Pedro Sánchez
Nadia Calviño 2020 (cropped)	Nadia Calviño	First Deputy Prime Minister	12 July 2021	29 December 2023	2 years and 170 days	Independent	Pedro Sánchez
Nadia Calviño 2020 (cropped)	Nadia Calviño	Ministry of Economy, Trade and Business	21 November 2023	29 December 2023	38 days	Independent	Pedro Sánchez
Teresa Ribera 2020b (cropped)	Teresa Ribera	Ministry for the Ecological Transition	7 June 2018	13 January 2020	1 year and 220 days	PSOE	Pedro Sánchez
Teresa Ribera 2020b (cropped)	Teresa Ribera	Fourth Deputy Prime Minister	13 January 2020	12 July 2021	1 year and 180 days	PSOE	Pedro Sánchez
Teresa Ribera 2020b (cropped)	Teresa Ribera	Ministry for the Ecological Transition and the Demographic Challenge	13 January 2020	25 November 2024	4 years and 317 days	PSOE	Pedro Sánchez
Teresa Ribera 2020b (cropped)	Teresa Ribera	Third Deputy Prime Minister	12 July 2021	25 November 2024	3 years and 136 days	PSOE	Pedro Sánchez
Arancha González Laya 2020 (cropped)	Arancha González Laya	Ministry of Foreign Affairs, European Union and Cooperation	13 January 2020	12 July 2021	1 year and 180 days	Independent	Pedro Sánchez
Carolina Darias 2020 (portrait)	Carolina Darias	Ministry of Territorial Policy and Civil Service of Spain	13 January 2020	27 January 2021	1 year and 14 days	PSOE	Pedro Sánchez
Carolina Darias 2020 (portrait)	Carolina Darias	Ministry of Health	27 January 2021	28 March 2023	2 years and 60 days	PSOE	Pedro Sánchez
Yolanda Díaz 2020 (cropped)	Yolanda Díaz	Ministry of Labour and Social Economy	13 January 2020	Incumbent	6 years and 280 days	PCE	Pedro Sánchez
Yolanda Díaz 2020 (cropped)	Yolanda Díaz	Third Deputy Prime Minister	31 March 2021	12 July 2021	103 days	PCE	Pedro Sánchez
Yolanda Díaz 2020 (cropped)	Yolanda Díaz	Second Deputy Prime Minister	12 July 2021	Incumbent	5 years and 100 days	PCE	Pedro Sánchez
Irene Montero 2020 (portrait)	Irene Montero	Ministry of Equality	13 January 2020	21 November 2023	3 years and 312 days	Unidas Podemos	Pedro Sánchez
Ione Belarra 2016 (cropped)	Ione Belarra	Ministry of Social Rights and 2030 Agenda	31 March 2021	21 November 2023	2 years and 235 days	Unidas Podemos	Pedro Sánchez
(Isabel Rodríguez) Firma de convenios para el desarrollo de Lanzaderas de Empleo en Puertollano y Talavera de la Reina (49482574962) (cropped)	Isabel Rodríguez García	Ministry of Territorial Policy	12 July 2021	21 November 2023	2 years and 132 days	PSOE	Pedro Sánchez
(Isabel Rodríguez) Firma de convenios para el desarrollo de Lanzaderas de Empleo en Puertollano y Talavera de la Reina (49482574962) (cropped)	Isabel Rodríguez García	Spokesperson of the Government	12 July 2021	21 November 2023	2 years and 132 days	PSOE	Pedro Sánchez
(Isabel Rodríguez) Firma de convenios para el desarrollo de Lanzaderas de Empleo en Puertollano y Talavera de la Reina (49482574962) (cropped)	Isabel Rodríguez García	Ministry of Housing and Urban Agenda	21 November 2023	Incumbent	2 years and 333 days	PSOE	Pedro Sánchez
Foto oficial de Pilar Llop	Pilar Llop	Ministry of Justice	12 July 2021	21 November 2023	2 years and 132 days	PSOE	Pedro Sánchez
RaquelSanchezJimenezWiki2	Raquel Sánchez Jiménez	Ministry of Transport, Mobility and Urban Agenda	12 July 2021	21 November 2023	2 years and 132 days	PSOE	Pedro Sánchez
PSOE Pilar Alegría (cropped)	Pilar Alegría	Ministry of Education and Vocational Training	12 July 2021	21 November 2023	2 years and 132 days	PSOE	Pedro Sánchez
PSOE Pilar Alegría (cropped)	Pilar Alegría	Ministry of Education, Vocational Training and Sports	21 November 2023	22 December 2025	2 years and 31 days	PSOE	Pedro Sánchez
PSOE Pilar Alegría (cropped)	Pilar Alegría	Spokesperson of the Government	21 November 2023	22 December 2025	2 years and 31 days	PSOE	Pedro Sánchez
Diana Morant foto de campaña v1	Diana Morant	Ministry of Science and Innovation	12 July 2021	21 November 2023	2 years and 132 days	PSOE	Pedro Sánchez
Diana Morant foto de campaña v1	Diana Morant	Ministry of Science, Innovation and Universities	21 November 2023	Incumbent	2 years and 333 days	PSOE	Pedro Sánchez
Diana Morant foto de campaña v1	Mónica García	Ministry of Health	21 November 2023	Incumbent	2 years and 333 days	Más Madrid	Pedro Sánchez
Diana Morant foto de campaña v1	Ana Redondo	Ministry of Equality	21 November 2023	Incumbent	2 years and 333 days	PSOE	Pedro Sánchez
Diana Morant foto de campaña v1	Elma Saiz	Ministry of Inclusion, Social Security and Migration	21 November 2023	Incumbent	2 years and 333 days	PSOE	Pedro Sánchez
Diana Morant foto de campaña v1	Elma Saiz	Spokesperson of the Government	22 December 2025	Incumbent	302 days	PSOE	Pedro Sánchez
Diana Morant foto de campaña v1	Sira Rego	Ministry of Youth and Children	21 November 2023	Incumbent	2 years and 333 days	United Left	Pedro Sánchez
Diana Morant foto de campaña v1	Sara Aagesen	Third Deputy Prime Minister	25 November 2024	Incumbent	1 year and 329 days	Independent	Pedro Sánchez
Diana Morant foto de campaña v1	Sara Aagesen	Ministry for the Ecological Transition and the Demographic Challenge	25 November 2024	Incumbent	1 year and 329 days	Independent	Pedro Sánchez
Diana Morant foto de campaña v1	Milagros Tolón	Ministry of Education, Vocational Training and Sports	22 December 2025	Incumbent	302 days	PSOE	Pedro Sánchez

== See also ==
- Politics of Spain
- Council of Ministers (Spain)
