= José María Gamazo =

Spanish politician

Minister-Under Secretary of the Presidency
- In office 12 June 1973 – 4 January 1974
- Prime Minister: Luis Carrero Blanco
- Preceded by: Luis Carrero Blanco
- Succeeded by: Antonio Carro Martínez

Personal details
- Born: José María Gamazo Manglano; 27 December 1929 Madrid, Spain
- Died: 10 September 2015 (aged 85) Madrid, Spain
- Party: Nonpartisan (National Movement)

José María Gamazo y Manglano (27 December 1929 – 10 September 2015) was a Spanish politician who was one of the ministers during the reign of Francisco Franco.

He previously belonged to the Senior Civil State Administrators, and a former member of the Technical Corps of the State Civil Administration. In 1964 he was appointed Director General of Services of the prime minister, dispatched daily with Luis Carrero Blanco. When the then admiral Luis was appointed President, he chose José to replace him as Minister-Under Secretary of the Presidency. As by the utmost confidence and proximity of Carrero, he ceased his actions on 3 January 1974. Later on, he was the alcalde of Almadén and Arrayanes Mines for several years before his death on 10 September 2015 in Madrid.
