= Ministry of the Presidency (Spain) =

Government ministry of Spain

- Ministerio de la Presidencia

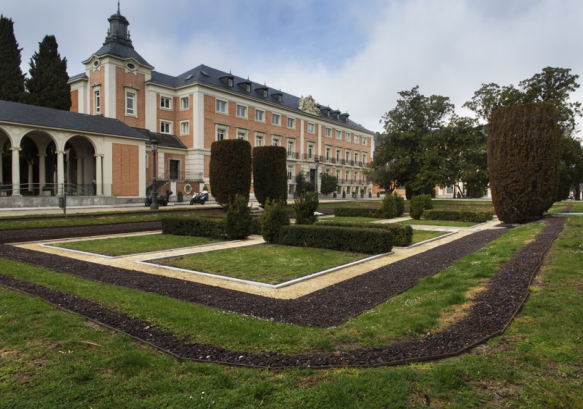
- Headquarters of the Ministry in the Palace of Moncloa

Agency overview
- Formed: 2 January 1974; 52 years ago (as a Cabinet Department)
- Preceding agency: Minister-Under Secretary of the Presidency
- Dissolved: 20 November 2023
- Superseding agency: Ministry of the Presidency, Justice and Relations with the Cortes
- Type: Ministry
- Jurisdiction: Government of Spain
- Headquarters: INIA Building, Moncloa Palace, Madrid
- Annual budget: € 482 million, 2023
- Child agencies: Official State Gazette; Patrimonio Nacional; Centre for Political and Constitutional Studies; Centro de Investigaciones Sociológicas
- Website: Ministry of the Presidency, Relations with the Cortes and Equality(in Spanish)

The Ministry of the Presidency (MPR) was the department of the Government of Spain that, from 1974 to 2023, assured the link between the different Ministries and the Prime Minister and it was responsible for the relations between the Government and the Parliament. This department also supported The Crown in the exercise of its functions.

In this sense, it was responsible for coordinating the matters of institutional relevance; preparing, carrying out and tracking the legislative program; supporting the Prime Minister; supporting the Cabinet, the Government Delegated Committees and the General Commission of Secretaries of State and Undersecretaries; supporting the Government with its relationships with the Cortes Generales and managing the government policies regarding historical and democratic memory, as well as the exercise of the right to religious freedom and worship.

As a supportive department of the Prime Minister, it assumed the functions of giving material, economic, budgetary and personnel support and, in general, as many others of this nature require the Premier and the bodies dependent on the Office of the Prime Minister. Likewise, the MPR was responsible for authorizasing the use of the flag, the coat of arms and other national symbols.

At the same time, the Presidency Minister exercised the role of secretary of the Council of Ministers, signing the minutes of each meeting of the Council as Minister-Secretary of the Council of Ministers.

In November 2023, the department was merged with the Ministry of Justice, creating the current Ministry of the Presidency, Justice and Relations with the Cortes.

== History ==
=== Origin ===
The background of the coordination work of the different areas of governmental action exercised by the current Ministry of the Presidency can be track down in the resolution of 30 November 1714, which, under the reign of Philip V, the Cabinet Council was created.

For the establishment of the Council of Ministers would have to wait more than 100 years, until the Royal Decree of 19 November 1823, under the reign of Ferdinand VII. It is at this time that the embryo of a ministerial coordination function and the Secretariat of the Government can be glimpsed, with the establishment of a book where the agreements of the Council would be written, which fell to the Ministers themselves.

=== Assistance to the prime minister ===
Despite this, some gestures already announced the future birth of a support structure for the Prime Minister, which would lead to an independent Ministry. Thus, by Royal Decree of 30 September 1851, a Directorate-General was created that assisted the President of the Council of Ministers (Prime Minister) in the management of overseas affairs, and that would be the embryo of the future Ministry of the Presidency.

It was also created, the position of the Under-Secretary of the Presidency of the Council of Ministers, however in its origins had no relationship with the functions of Secretariat of the Government until 1871. At the beginning of the 1890s, the structure of the Office of the Under-Secretary of the Presidency was remodeled, assigning functions of relationship with the constitutional bodies and with regard to appointments and dismissals.

In the 20th century, the position became known as the Administrative Office of the Presidency of the Council of Ministers (1926), recovering that of Under-Secretary of the Presidency of the Council of Ministers by virtue of the Royal Decree of 4 February 1930. This designation kept under the Second Republic. It is that time, the figure without especially specific functions, performs tasks as different as those derived from being the Technical Secretariat for Morocco and Colonies and for the National Tourist Board.

Under the Franco regime was confirmed by Decree of 11 August 1939 the existence of the Under-Secretary of the Presidency, and Luis Carrero Blanco was appointed it. According to the Law of 22 December 1948, the Office of the Assistant Secretary was a special Department that would be in charge of the General Policy and Coordination services.

=== Ministry ===
It would be in 1951, through the Decree-Law of 19 July, when the Under-Secretary of the Presidency was given the rank of Minister and with the Legal Regime of the State Administration Act (1957) it was granted to it the function of Secretariat of the Government, as well as preside over the Commissions of Undersecretaries. During the 1950s and 1960s, the Ministry of the Presidency was the driving force behind the administrative reforms underway.

In 1957 he was assigned the Official State Gazette, the Office of Economic Coordination and Programming was created within the scope of the Technical General Secretariat of the Ministry and it was centralized the competencies in the area of civil servants, with the creation of the Center for the Training and Improvement of Civil Servants (1958, future National Institute for Public Administration), the Superior Commission for Personnel and the Directorate-General for the Civil Service.

In 1967 it coincided for the first time the positions of Minister of the Presidency (at the time Minister-Under Secretary) and Deputy Prime Minister, in this case in the person of Luis Carrero Blanco. This circumstance would be repeated in the future in the cases of Alfonso Osorio (1976–1977, 2nd Deputy PM), Francisco Álvarez-Cascos (1996–2000), Mariano Rajoy (2000–2001 and 2002–2003), Javier Arenas (2003–2004, 2nd Deputy PM), María Teresa Fernández de la Vega (2004–2010), Soraya Sáenz de Santamaría (2011–2018) and Carmen Calvo (2018–2021).

In spite of the existence of an entire Office since 1951 at the service of the Minister-Undersecretary of the Presidency, the Ministry was officially created by a Law of 2 January 1974. In 1976 it assumed the National Statistics Institute, the Directorate-General for Territorial Action and Environment and the National Geographic Institute.

=== Democracy ===
The most relevant responsibilities assumed during this period were those derived from the relations between the executive branch and the legislative branch because of the parliamentary system created by the Constitution of 1978. For this purpose, in 1979 it was created the Office of the Secretary of State for Constitutional Development, which two years later would become the current Secretariat of State for Relations with the Cortes. The importance of these responsibilities were seen in the period of 1986 to 1993 when the Ministry was renamed Ministry of Relations with the Cortes and the Government Secretariat

In 1977 the Directorate-General for Territorial Action and Environment was transferred to the Ministry of Development and the National Statistics Institute to the Ministry of Economy. In 1987 the Development Ministry also assumed the National Geographic Institute.

With the creation of the Ministry of Public Administrations in 1979, it lost the responsibilities on the Civil Service. In 1993, the Office of the Spokesperson of the Government was integrated in the Ministry and in 1996 these structure was extended creating the Secretariat of State for Press. Since then, the positions of Minister of the Presidency and Spokesperson have coincided in the persons of Alfredo Pérez Rubalcaba (1993–1996), Mariano Rajoy Brey (2002–2003), María Teresa Fernández de la Vega (2004–2010) and Soraya Sáenz de Santamaría (2011–2016).

As a consequence of the social alarm provoked by the Prestige Disaster, in the 2003–2004 period a Commissioner was created for actions resulting from the catastrophe of the MV Prestige, with the rank of Secretary of State, supported by the Office of the Commissioner and functionally dependent on the Minister of the Presidency. The position was occupied by Rodolfo Martín Villa. The successor of this body the Center for the Prevention and Fight against Maritime and Coastal Pollution was included in the structure of the Ministry, with the rank of Directorate-General and whose competences passed in 2008 to the Ministry of Environment.

In 2012, the National Intelligence Centre was integrated in the Ministry and in 2013 it was created the Office for the Implementation of the Administration Reform (OPERA).

Since November 2016, it assumes the responsibilities of relations with the Autonomous Communities and the Entities that make up the Local Administration and those relating to the territorial organization of the State but it loses the Secretariat of State for Press, which is transferred to the Office of the Prime Minister. In 2017 it was created the Government Commissioner facing the Demographic Challenge. In June 2018 it loses the responsibilities on territorial policy but assumes those on equality.

In 2020, the ministry's powers over equality policies are transferred to the Ministry of Equality but, in exchange, the department assumes the powers regarding democratic memory and religious freedom, both coming from the Ministry of Justice. In 2021, Félix Bolaños was appointed minister of the Presidency.

== Structure ==
The Ministry of the Presidency was organised in the following superior bodies:

- The Secretariat of State for Relations with the Cortes and Constitutional Affairs.
  - The Directorate-General for Relations with the Cortes.
    - The Deputy Directorate-General for Legislative Coordination.
    - The Deputy Directorate-General for Parliamentary Initiatives.
    - The Deputy Directorate-General for Written Control.
    - The Deputy Directorate-General for Parliamentary Documentation.
  - The Directorate-General for Constitutional Affairs and Legal Coordination.
    - The Deputy Directorate-General for Constitutional Regime.
- The Secretariat of State for Democratic Memory.
  - The Directorate-General for Democratic Memory.
    - The Deputy Directorate-General for Assistance to Victims of the Civil War and the Dictatorship.
    - The Division for Administrative Coordination and Institutional Relations.
- The Undersecretariat of the Presidency, Relations with the Cortes and Democratic Memory.
  - The Technical General Secretariat-Government Secretariat.
  - The Directorate-General for Services
  - The Technical Cabinet.
  - The Deputy Directorate-General for Religious Freedom.
- The Special Commissioner for the Reconstruction of the island of La Palma, with rank of Under-Secretary.
  - The Office of the Special Commissioner for the Reconstruction of the island of La Palma.

From the ministry also depended other public agencies and bodies:

- Boletín Oficial del Estado
- Centro de Estudios Políticos y Constitucionales
- Centro de Investigaciones Sociológicas
- Patrimonio Nacional
