= Juan Moscoso del Prado =

Spanish economist and politician

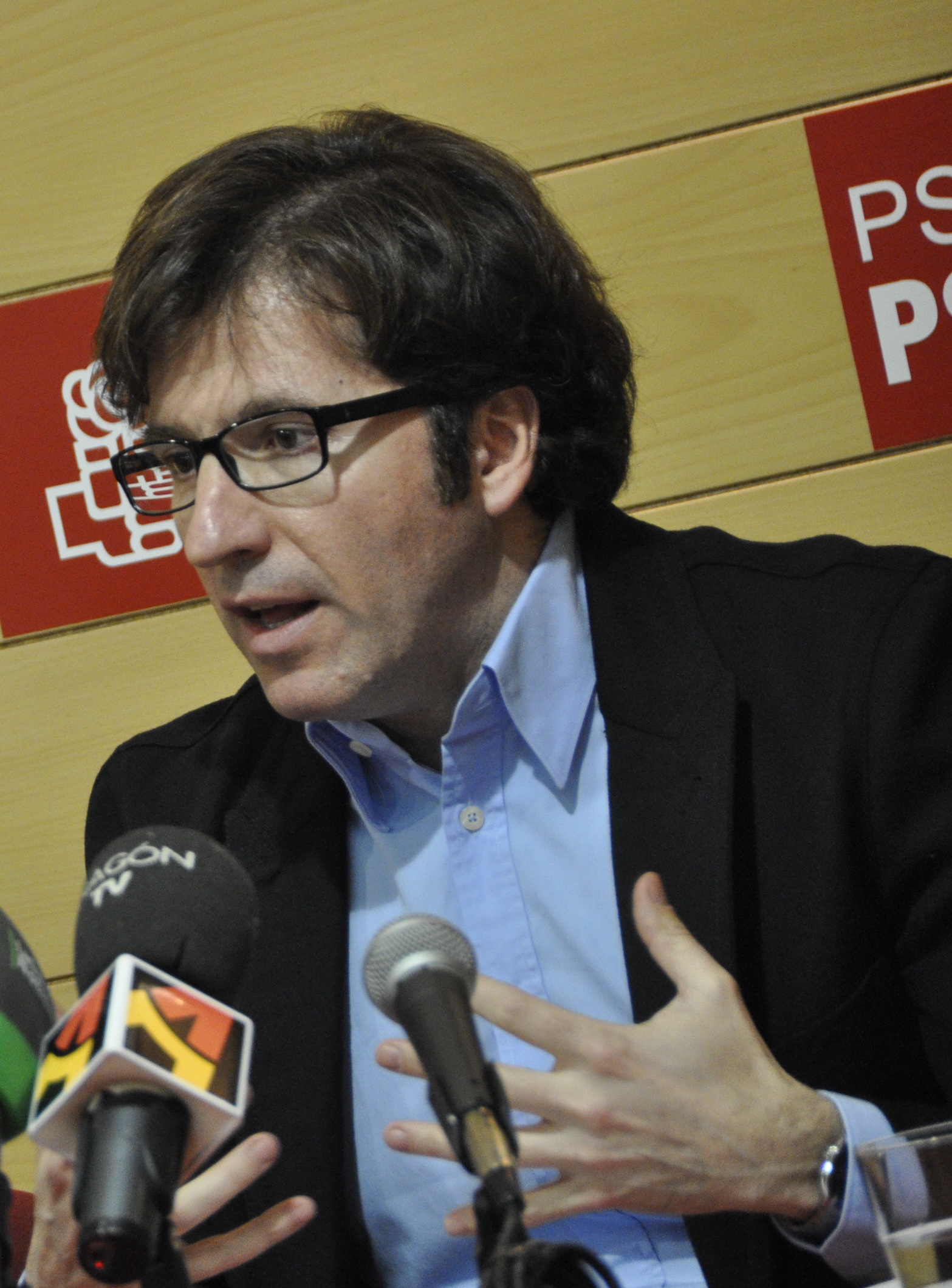
Juan Moscoso

Juan Moscoso del Prado Hernández (born 5 July 1966 in Pamplona) is a Spanish economist and former politician of the Spanish Socialist Workers' Party (PSOE) who served a member of the Spanish Congress of Deputies from 2004 to 2016, representing Navarre.

== Early life and education ==
Moscoso is the son of former Spanish government minister Javier Moscoso. He has a doctorate in economics and business administration from the Autonomous University of Madrid and a master's degree in European economic studies from the College of Europe.

== Career ==
Moscoso was the PSN-PSOE candidate for mayor of Pamplona for the 2011 Spanish local elections.

In addition to his committee assignments, Moscoso was a member of the Spanish delegation to the Parliamentary Assembly of the Council of Europe (PACE) from 2009 to 2012. In the Assembly, he served on the Committee on General Affairs and the Committee on Economic Affairs and Development.

== Other activities ==
- Indra Sistemas, Member of the Board of Directors (since 2022)
- European Council on Foreign Relations (ECFR), Member
