= Virgilio Zapatero =

Spanish politician

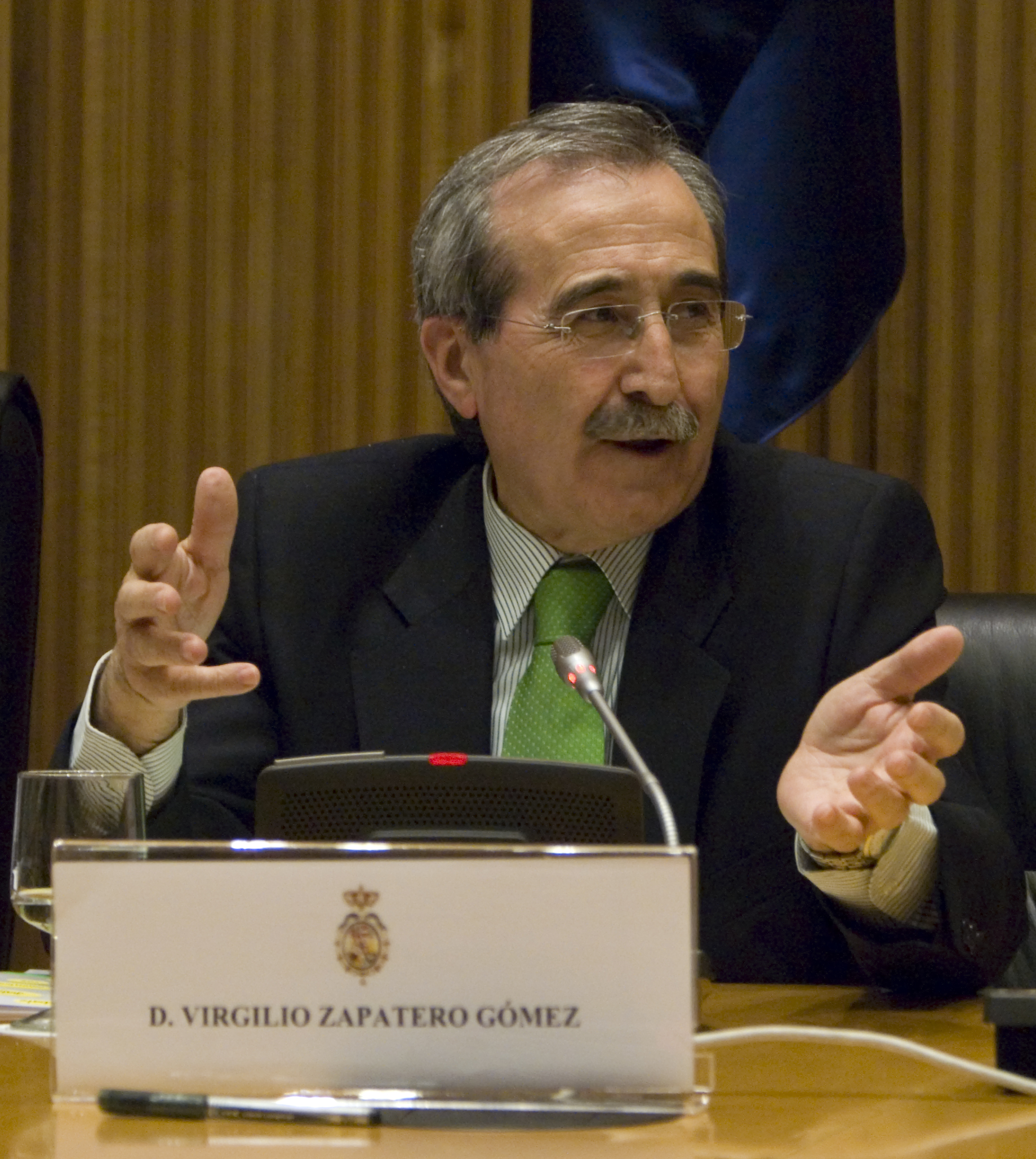

Minister of Relations with the Cortes and Government Secretariat Secretary of the Council of Ministers
- In office 26 July 1986 – 14 July 1993
- Prime Minister: Felipe González
- Preceded by: Javier Moscoso (Presidency)
- Succeeded by: Alfredo Pérez Rubalcaba (Presidency)

Personal details
- Born: Virgilio Zapatero Gómez; 26 June 1946 (age 80) Cisneros, Palencia, Spain
- Party: Spanish Socialist Workers' Party
- Education: Autonomous University of Madrid

Virgilio Zapatero Gómez (born 26 June 1946) is a Spanish politician who served as Minister of Relations with the Cortes and Government Secretariat from July 1986 to July 1993.
