= Ramón Jáuregui =

Spanish politician (born 1948)

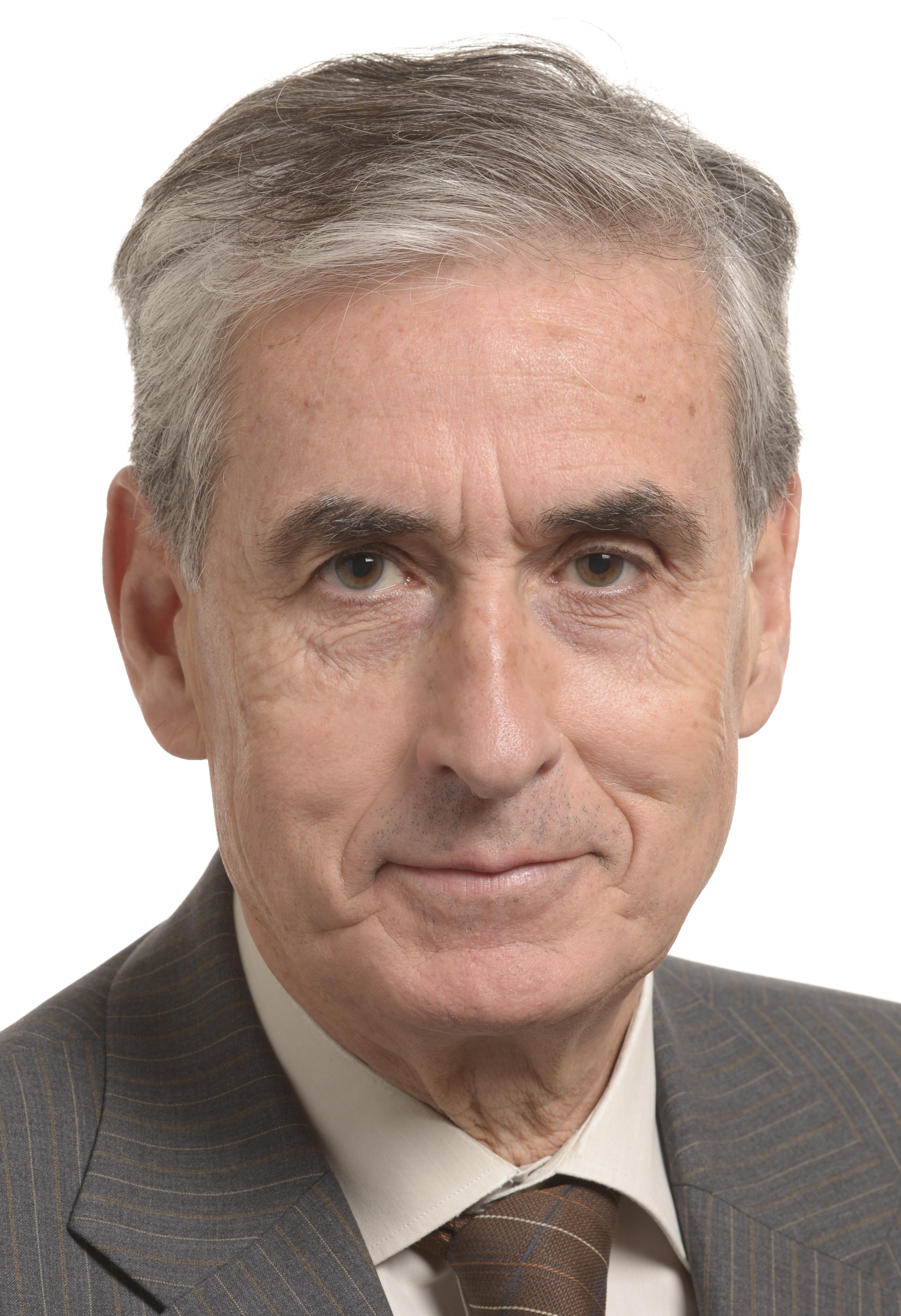

Minister of the Presidency Secretary of the Council of Ministers
- In office 21 October 2010 – 22 December 2011
- Prime Minister: José Luis Rodríguez Zapatero
- Preceded by: María Teresa Fernández de la Vega
- Succeeded by: Soraya Sáenz de Santamaría

Member of the European Parliament
- In office 2014–2019
- Constituency: Spain

Member of the Congress of Deputies
- In office 13 December 2011 – 1 July 2014
- Constituency: Álava
- In office 12 March 2000 – 13 July 2009
- Constituency: Álava

Personal details
- Born: 1 September 1948 (age 77) San Sebastián, Spain
- Party: Spanish Socialist Workers' Party
- Occupation: Politician

Ramón Jáuregui Atondo (born 1948) is a Spanish politician. A member of the Spanish Socialist Workers' Party (PSOE), he served as Minister of the Presidency (2010–2011) during the Second Zapatero Government. He also was member of the European Parliament in two separate spells (2009–2010 and 2014–2019).

== Biography ==
He served as Vice-Lehendakari of the Basque Government from 1987 to 1991.

Jáuregui first served as Member of the European Parliament from 2009 until 2010. During that brief period, he was the Parliament's rapporteur on the European Union's accession to the European Convention on Human Rights.

From 2014 until 2019, Jáuregui served as chair of the Delegation to the Euro-Latin American Parliamentary Assembly and as member of the Committee on Constitutional Affairs. In 2016, he also joined the Parliament's Committee of Inquiry into Money Laundering, Tax Avoidance and Tax Evasion (PANA) that is to investigate the Panama Papers revelations and tax avoidance schemes more broadly.

In addition to his committee assignments, Jáuregui served as a member of the European Parliament Intergroup on Western Sahara.

In March 2018, he announced his will to leave politics. He did not state at the time if that meant to immediately renounce to the MEP seat.

Political offices
Preceded by Javier García Egotxeaga	Vice-Lehendakari of the Basque Government; 12 March 1987–7 February 1991	Succeeded by Jon Imanol Azúa
Preceded by María Teresa Fernández de la Vega	Minister of the Presidency; 2010–2011	Succeeded by Soraya Sáenz de Santamaría
Preceded by José Ignacio Salafranca Sánchez-Neyra	Chair of the European Parliament's Delegation to the Euro-Latin American Parliamentary Assembly (DLAT); 2014–2019	Succeeded by
