= Matías Rodríguez Inciarte =

Spanish politician (born 1948)

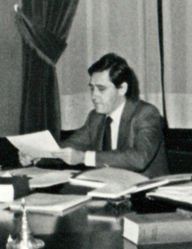

Minister of the Presidency Secretary of the Council of Ministers
- In office 1 September 1981 – 3 December 1982
- Prime Minister: Leopoldo Calvo-Sotelo
- Preceded by: Pío Cabanillas Gallas
- Succeeded by: Javier Moscoso

Personal details
- Born: Matías Rodríguez Inciarte; 23 March 1948 (age 78) Madrid, Spain
- Party: UCD
- Education: Complutense University of Madrid

Matías Rodríguez Inciarte (born 23 March 1948) is a Spanish politician from the Union of the Democratic Centre (UCD) who served as Minister of the Presidency from September 1981 to December 1982.
