= Soraya Sáenz de Santamaría =

Spanish politician (born 1971)

The Most Excellent Soraya Sáenz de Santamaría
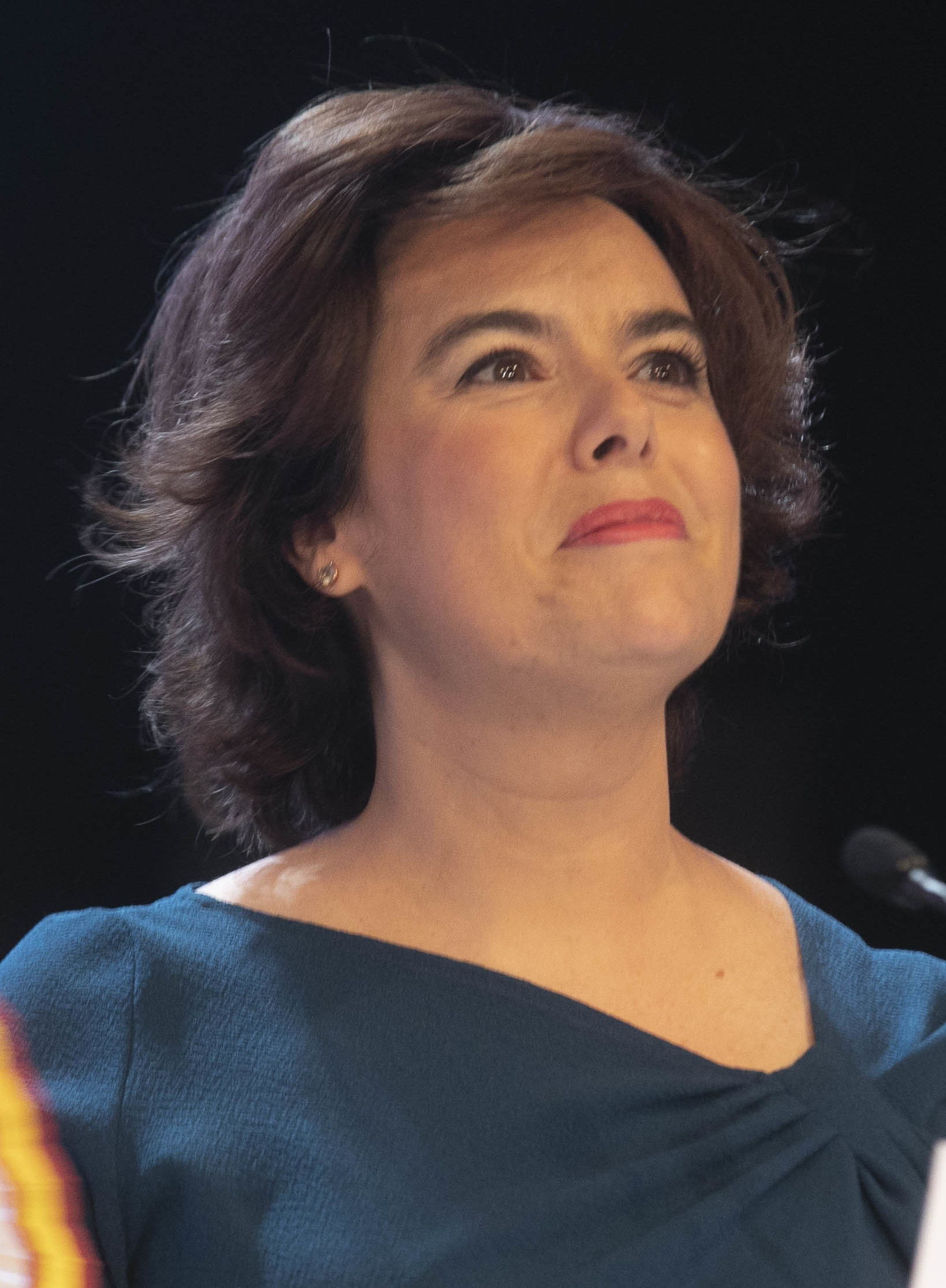
- Sáenz de Santamaría in 2018

Deputy Prime Minister of Spain
- In office 21 December 2011 – 7 June 2018
- Prime Minister: Mariano Rajoy
- Preceded by: Elena Salgado
- Succeeded by: Carmen Calvo

Minister of the Presidency of Spain (Note: Minister of the Presidency from 2011 to 2016 and Minister of the Presidency and for Territorial Administrations from 2016 to 2018.) Secretary of the Council of Ministers
- In office 21 December 2011 – 7 June 2018
- Prime Minister: Mariano Rajoy
- Preceded by: Ramón Jáuregui
- Succeeded by: Carmen Calvo

Spokesperson of the Government of Spain
- In office 21 December 2011 – 3 November 2016
- Prime Minister: Mariano Rajoy
- Preceded by: José Blanco López
- Succeeded by: Íñigo Méndez de Vigo

Member of the Congress of Deputies
- In office 13 May 2004 – 10 September 2018
- Constituency: Madrid

Personal details
- Born: María Soraya Sáenz de Santamaría Antón; 10 June 1971 (age 54) Valladolid, Spain
- Party: People's Party
- Spouse: Iván Rosa (2006–present)
- Children: 1
- Education: University of Valladolid
- Occupation: Politician, state lawyer

María Soraya Sáenz de Santamaría Antón (born 10 June 1971) is a Spanish former politician of the People's Party who served as Deputy Prime Minister of Spain and Minister of the Presidency from 2011 to 2018. She was member of the Congress of Deputies representing Madrid from 2004 until 2018.

== Biography ==
=== Education and early life ===
Born in Valladolid in 1971, Sáenz de Santamaría grew up as the only child of Pedro Sáenz de Santamaría and Petra Antón.

She studied the Licentiate Degree in Law in the University of Valladolid (1989–1994) and got a first class honours degree, summa cum laude, achieving rank one in her promotion, first of her class, awarded top honors, with an academic record full of honours-qualifications, awarded the Bachelor's Degree Extraordinary Award conferred by the University of Valladolid, for her outstanding academic record.

After passing a "competitive public examination" (oposiciones), she joined the State Lawyers Corps (an elite body of civil servant lawyers of the State).

In 2005 Sáenz de Santamaría married José Iván Rosa Vallejo, with whom she has a son, born on 11 November 2011.

=== Start of political career ===
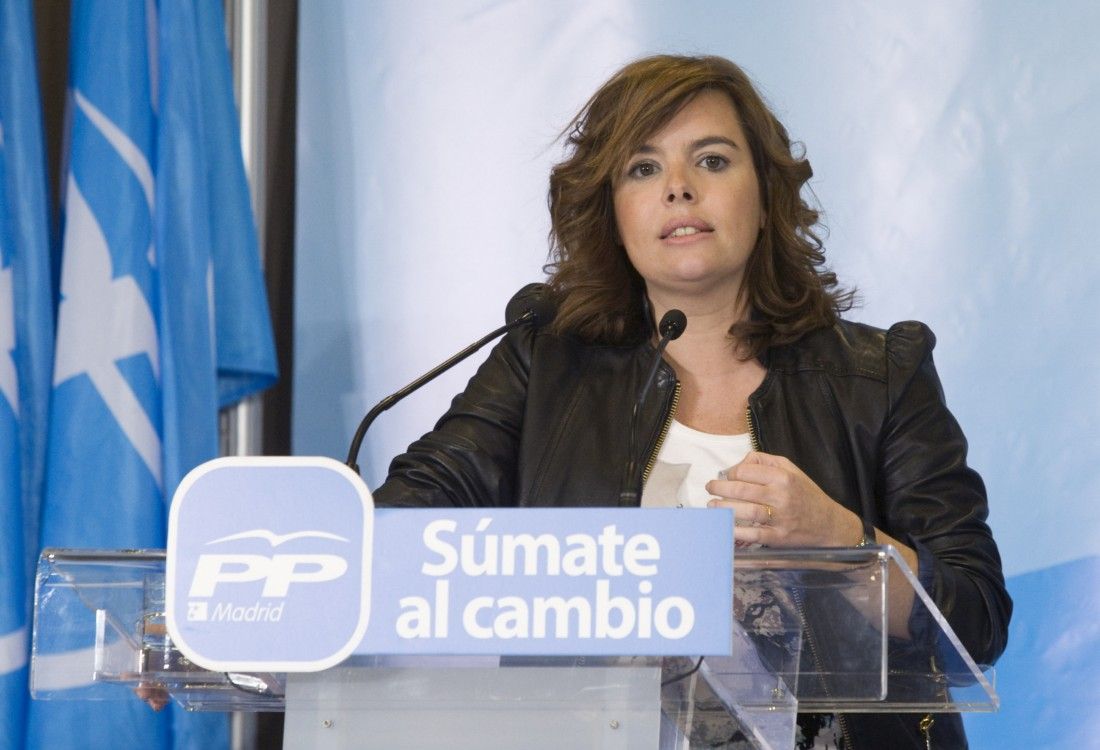
Sáenz de Santamaría in November 2011 during a campaign event at Alcalá de Henares

In 2000, Mariano Rajoy's former chief of staff hired her to work as advisor to the cabinet of the First Vice-president of the Government in the Ministry of the Presidency and the Ministry of Home Affairs.

From 2004 to 2008 Sáenz de Santamaría, served as secretary in the People's Party (PP) executive board, charged with the party's Regional and Local Policy.

She ran as candidate to the Congress of Deputies, 19th in the PP list for Madrid vis-à-vis the April 2004 general election. As the PP obtained 17 seats in the constituency, she was not elected, but she assumed the office of deputy in the Lower House on 13 May 2004, covering the vacant seat caused by the resignation of Rodrigo Rato, who had been appointed as managing director of the International Monetary Fund. She served as legislator for the rest of the 8th term of the Cortes Generales.

In the 9th term, she was chosen by Mariano Rajoy to become the Spokesperson for the People's Group in the Congress of Deputies, replacing Eduardo Zaplana.

=== Right hand of Rajoy at the Government ===
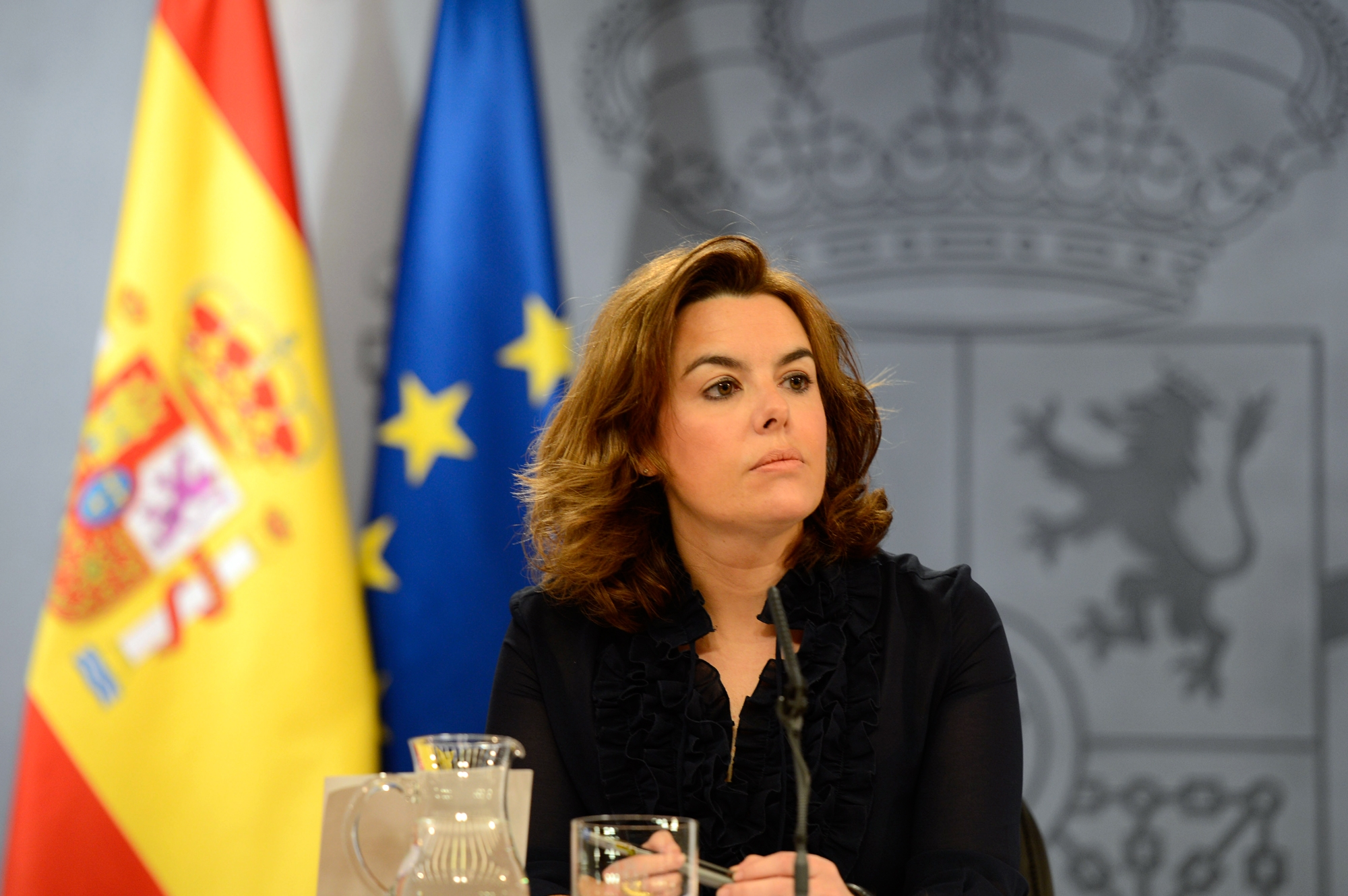
Sáenz de Santamaría delivering a press conference at La Moncloa in May 2012, following a meeting of the Council of Ministers.

Following the results of the 2011 general election, which delivered an absolute majority to the PP in the Congress of Deputies, Mariano Rajoy was invested Prime Minister and formed a new cabinet. Sáenz de Santamaría became the Deputy Prime Minister and Spokesperson for the government on 22 December 2011.

Sáenz de Santamaría served in the Rajoy Government as Deputy Prime Minister and Minister of the Presidency from December 2011 to June 2018, as Spokesperson of the Government from 2011 to 2016, and as Minister for Territorial Administrations from November 2016 to June 2018. In 2014, for a brief time, she also assumed in acting capacity the portfolios of Health and Justice.

On 27 October 2017, after Mariano Rajoy enforced the Article 155 of the Spanish Constitution on the Catalan government, dismissing regional premier Carles Puigdemont, Sáenz de Santamaría was entrusted with the responsibility for overseeing the functions of the Generalitat of Catalonia.

=== Failed bid for party leadership ===
Wordmark used for her bid to party leadership

On 5 June 2018, after the successful motion of no confidence in Mariano Rajoy, and Rajoy's removal from the post of Prime Minister and his decision to also resign as leader of the People's Party, Sáenz de Santamaría postulated herself as candidate in the upcoming primaries to elect a new party leader. Soraya Saénz de Santamaría edged the 1st position in the voting held among party members with a narrow margin of 1,500 votes over Pablo Casado, with otherwise staunch rival María Dolores de Cospedal coming third. On 21 July 2018, a run-off (now voted among party delegates) between the first and second candidates in the first round was held between her and Casado. Sáenz de Santamaría lost to Casado, who became the new party leader, in what was considered a party swing towards the right. Some months following her defeat, in September 2018, Sáenz de Santamaría announced that she was leaving politics after 18 years.

=== Later activity ===
On 18 October 2018 she was appointed member of the Council of State, the supreme consultative body for the Spanish Government, assuming office on 8 November 2018. In March 2019, the incorporation of Sáenz de Santamaría to the Cuatrecasas law firm (both as associate and as member of the board of directors) was announced.

== Positions and ideology ==
Saenz de Santamaría, called by many media as "the most powerful woman in Spain since (the return of) democracy", has been often considered to espouse a technocratic form of governance, without a clearly defined ideology. Distanced from the party executive board except for her spell at the helm of the area of Regional and Local Policy, it has been pointed out she built her political leadership outside from the party rather than from the inside. She was regarded as the theoretical representative of the most moderate wing within the PP.

== Notes ==
Party political offices
Preceded by Eduardo Zaplana	Spokesperson of the People's Party Parliamentary Group in the Congress of Deputies; 31 March 2008 – 13 December 2011	Succeeded by Alfonso Alonso
