= María Teresa Fernández de la Vega =

Spanish politician (born 1949)

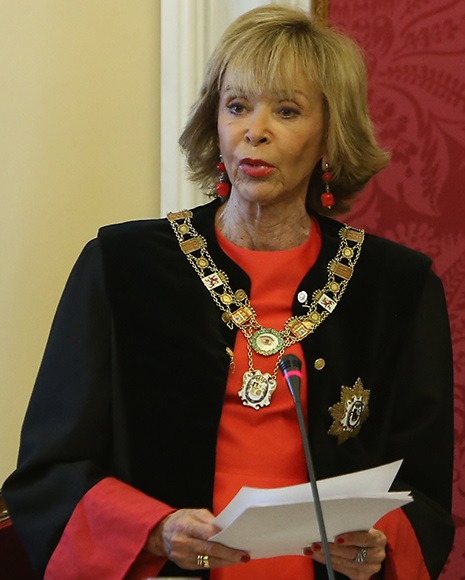

72nd President of the Council of State
- In office 3 July 2018 – 19 October 2022
- Preceded by: José Manuel Romay Beccaría
- Succeeded by: Magdalena Valerio

First Deputy Prime Minister of Spain
- In office 18 April 2004 – 21 October 2010
- Monarch: Juan Carlos I
- Prime Minister: José Luis Rodríguez Zapatero
- Preceded by: Rodrigo Rato
- Succeeded by: Alfredo Pérez Rubalcaba

Minister of the Presidency Secretary of the Council of Ministers
- In office 18 April 2004 – 21 October 2010
- Prime Minister: José Luis Rodríguez Zapatero
- Preceded by: Javier Arenas
- Succeeded by: Ramón Jáuregui

Member of the Congress of Deputies
- In office 9 March 2008 – 21 October 2010
- Constituency: Valencia
- In office 14 March 2004 – 9 March 2008
- Constituency: Madrid
- In office 12 March 2000 – 14 March 2004
- Constituency: Segovia
- In office March 1996 – March 2000
- Constituency: Jaen

Personal details
- Born: María Teresa Fernández de la Vega Sanz; 15 June 1949 (age 77) Valencia, Spain
- Party: PSOE
- Other political affiliations: PSUC
- Education: Complutense University of Madrid
- Profession: Jurist

María Teresa Fernández de la Vega Sanz (born 15 June 1949) is a Spanish politician and magistrate of the Socialist Party. During her political career, she served as first deputy prime minister, minister of the Presidency and government spokesperson under prime minister José Luis Rodríguez Zapatero from 2004 to 2010 and as president of the Council of State from 2018 to 2022, being the first first female deputy prime minister and the first female president of the advisory council.

== Early life and career ==
Fernández de la Vega is the daughter of Wenceslao Fernández de la Vega Lombán who was a public servant during Franco's dictatorship, a delegate of the ministry of employment headed at that time by Fermín Sanz Orrio (1957–1962). She was born in Valencia in 1949. She earned a degree in law from the Complutense University of Madrid in the early 1970s. In 1974 she entered Spain's Cuerpo de Secretarios Jurídicos Laborales, a specialised body of the civil service. She is also the niece of Jimena Fernández de la Vega, known as one of the first women to graduate in Medicine in Spain.

== Political career ==
Fernández de la Vega started her political career in the Unified Socialist Party of Catalonia, remaining a member of it until 1979. From 1982 until 1985, she was the director of the advisory cabinet of the minister of justice, and in 1985 she was appointed general director of services at the ministry of justice. In 1986 she became a member of the legal cooperation committee of the Council of Europe. In 1990, she was chosen as a spokesperson of the general council of judicial power by the Senate (1994–1996). On 13 May 1994, the then Justice Minister Juan Alberto Belloch appointed her as the 1st Secretary of State for Justice.

Fernández de la Vega was elected a member of the Spanish Congress for Jaén for the Spanish Socialist Workers' Party candidacy for the 1996–2000 term, being re-elected in the elections of 2000 for Segovia. During this term she became general secretary of the Socialist parliamentary group.

In the Spanish general election of 2004 she became a member of the parliament for Madrid, and on 18 April of that year she was appointed first vice president and minister of Presidency, remaining the incumbent of each.

Fernández de la Vega was the first woman to take on the functions of the prime minister in the history of Spanish democracy, when, on 24 April 2004, during the first official visit abroad of Spain's Prime Minister, Zapatero, she presided over the Council of Ministers.

In March 2006, the first vice president went on an African tour with the state secretary for cooperation, Leire Pajín, visiting Kenya and Mozambique, in whose capital, Maputo, they celebrated International Women's Day and closed the forum "Spain-Africa: Women for a better world".

For the 2008 elections, Fernández de la Vega headed the list for the PSOE in Valencia. She left all the political offices in October 2010.

== President of the Council of State ==
After leaving the first political line, on 3 July 2018, prime minister Pedro Sánchez chose her to chair over the Council of State, the supreme consultative council of the Spanish government. She assumed the office on 5 July 2018, becoming the first woman to chair the council.

== Other activities ==
- Judges for Democracy (Jueces para la Democracia), Member
- Graduate School for Global and International Studies, University of Salamanca, Member of the Advisory Board

In addition, Fernández de la Vega has written many papers, including La reforma de la jurisdicción laboral and Derechos humanos y Consejo de Europa.

== Recognition ==
- On 7 October 2006 Fernández de la Vega received the Tomás y Valiente Award in Fuenlabrada, Madrid.
- On 6 November 2010 Fernández de la Vega was granted with the Grand Cross of the Order of Charles III.

== See also ==
- Council of Ministers of Spain (8th Legislature)

Political offices
Preceded by Rodrigo Rato	First Deputy Prime Minister of Spain; 2004–2010	Succeeded by Alfredo Pérez Rubalcaba
Preceded by Javier Arenas	Minister of the Presidency; 2004–2010	Succeeded by Ramón Jáuregui Atondo
Preceded by Eduardo Zaplana	Spokesperson of the Government of Spain; 2004–2010	Succeeded by Alfredo Pérez Rubalcaba
