= Luis Carrero Blanco =

Spanish Navy officer and Prime Minister in 1973

The Most Excellent Admiral-General Luis Carrero Blanco

Prime Minister of Spain
- In office 9 June 1973 – 20 December 1973
- Leader: Francisco Franco
- Deputy: Torcuato Fernández-Miranda
- Preceded by: Francisco Franco
- Succeeded by: Torcuato Fernández-Miranda (acting)

Deputy Prime Minister of Spain
- In office 22 September 1967 – 9 June 1973
- Leader: Francisco Franco
- Preceded by: Agustín Muñoz Grandes
- Succeeded by: Torcuato Fernández-Miranda

Minister-Under Secretary of the Presidency (Note: The post was elevated to the rank of ministry on 19 July 1951.) Secretary of the Council of Ministers
- In office 5 May 1941 – 9 June 1973
- Nominated by: Francisco Franco
- Preceded by: Valentín Galarza Morante
- Succeeded by: José María Gamazo

Member of the Cortes Españolas
- In office 16 March 1943 – 24 March 1946
- Nominated by: Francisco Franco

Personal details
- Born: Luis Carrero Blanco; 4 March 1904 Santoña, Spain
- Died: 20 December 1973 (aged 69) Madrid, Francoist Spain
- Cause of death: Assassination by explosive device
- Resting place: Mingorrubio Cemetery, El Pardo, Madrid
- Spouse: María del Carmen Lozana Abeo (m. 1946)
- Children: 5

Military service
- Allegiance: Spain (1918–1973); Nationalist faction (1936–1939)
- Branch/service: Spanish Navy
- Years of service: 1918–1973
- Rank: Admiral (Note: He was posthumously "exalted" to honorary recognition as captain general of the Navy)
- Battles/wars: Rif War; Spanish Civil War

Admiral-General Luis Carrero Blanco (Spanish pronunciation: [ˈlwis kaˈreɾo ˈβlaŋko]; 4 March 1904 – 20 December 1973) was a Spanish Navy officer and politician. A long-time confidant and right-hand man of dictator Francisco Franco, Carrero served as Prime Minister of Spain.

Upon graduating from the naval academy Carrero Blanco participated in the Rif War, and later the Spanish Civil War, in which he supported the Nationalist faction. He became one of the most prominent figures in Francoist Spain's power structure and held throughout his career a number of high-ranking offices such as those of Minister-Under Secretary of the Presidency from 1941 to 1967 and Franco's deputy prime minister from 1967 to 1973. He also was the main drafter behind the 1947 Law of Succession to the Headship of the State. Franco handpicked him as his successor in the role of head of government, with Carrero thereby taking office in June 1973.

Shortly after he became prime minister, Carrero Blanco was assassinated in December 1973 by a cache of explosives placed in a tunnel by the Basque nationalist group Euskadi Ta Askatasuna (ETA).

== Life ==
=== Early life ===
Luis Carrero Blanco was born on 4 March 1904 in the coastal town of Santoña, province of Santander, to Camilo Carrero Gutiérrez, an army officer, and Ángeles Blanco Abascal, a native of Santoña. He studied at the Colegio Manzanedo in Santoña and entered the Spanish Naval Academy in San Fernando, Cádiz, in January 1918.

After completing his studies, he was commissioned as an alférez de navío on 19 September 1922 and returned to the battleship Alfonso XIII. After taking the Submarine School course in 1924, he served on the guardacostas Arcila, participated in the Rif War, including the landings at Alcazarseguer and Alhucemas in 1925, and was promoted to teniente de navío in September 1926.

In May 1927 he became second-in-command of the submarine B-2. He married María del Carmen Pichot y Villa in 1929, and later that year he was given command of the submarine B-5.

=== Civil war ===
At the outbreak of the Spanish Civil War, Carrero Blanco was a naval instructor teaching submarine tactics at the Naval Warfare College in Madrid. He first took refuge in the Mexican embassy and then in the French embassy, crossed into France, and in July 1937 entered the Nationalist zone through San Sebastián.

He then served as naval liaison to the Army of the North, later commanded the destroyer Huesca and, from April 1938, the submarine General Sanjurjo. In October 1938 he embarked on the cruiser Canarias as chief of staff of the Cruiser Division, and in August 1939 he was appointed Chief of Operations of the Navy General Staff.

=== Political career ===
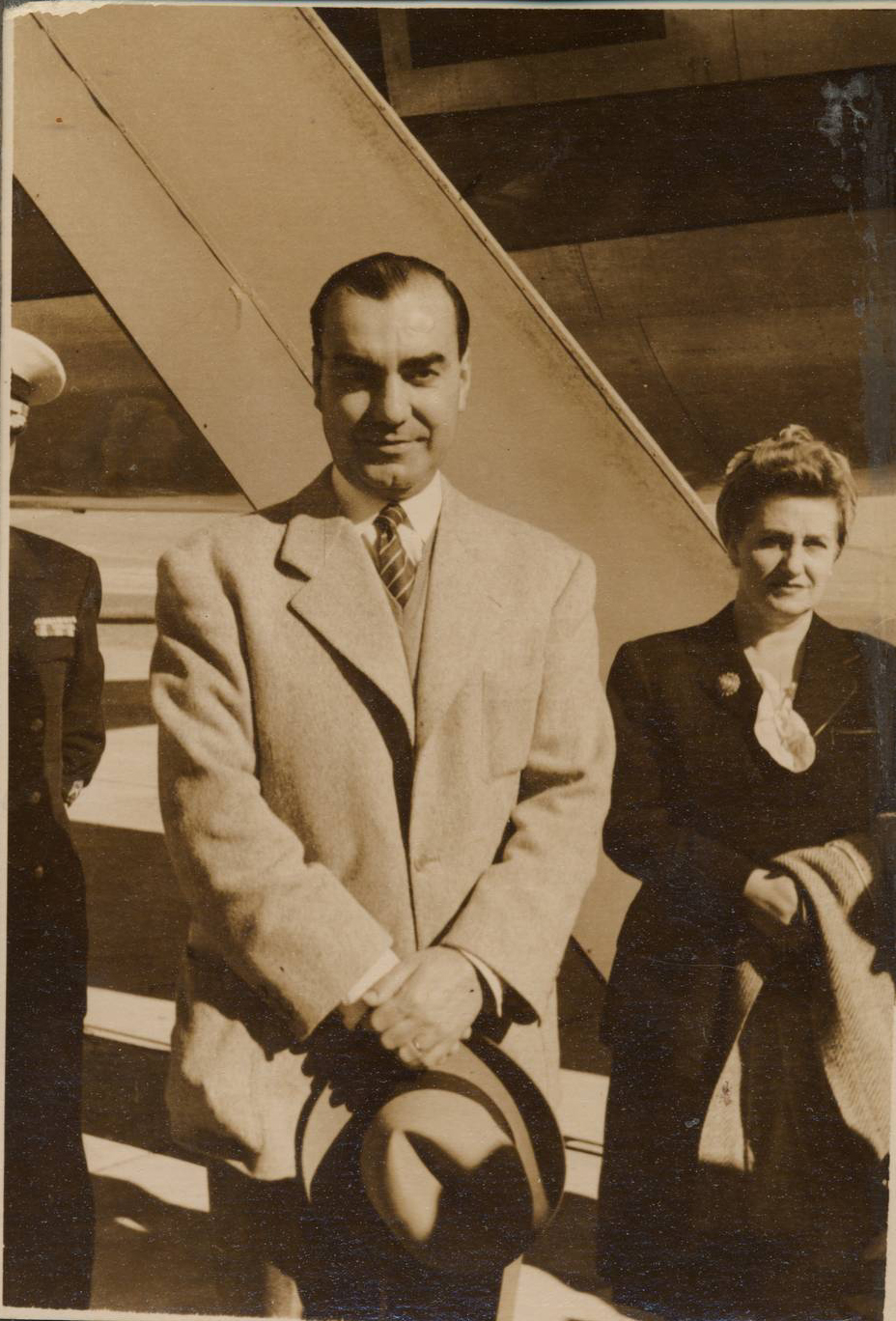
Carrero at the Gando Airport, Gran Canaria (1947).

In May 1941, Franco appointed Carrero (age 37) as Under-Secretary of the Presidency of the Government, replacing Valentín Galarza Morante. Following the 1942 Begoña incident, Carrero advised Franco to remove Ramón Serrano Suñer from ministerial rank and from the post of president of the Political Junta of FET y de las JONS, and so Franco did. Carrero was—as Joan Maria Thomàs puts it—"extremely faithful and submissive to El Caudillo", a polar opposite of Suñer, of whom the dictator had become weary despite their family connection.

Carrero Blanco was made vice admiral in 1963 and admiral in 1966. He was appointed Deputy Prime Minister on 21 September 1967.

Upon the nomination of Juan Carlos of Bourbon as heir to Franco in the headship of state in 1969, it was believed that an authoritarian monarchy guided by Carrero would guarantee the continuation of Francoism without Franco, an idea underpinned by Franco's own words during the Bourbon's nominating speech: está atado y bien atado ('all is tied down and well tied down').

Carrero reached the peak of his political career on 8 June 1973, when Franco appointed him Prime Minister.

The supporters of the aforementioned authoritarian conservative continuation to the Francoist regime (the continuista solution) suffered two successive blows in the wake of the assassination of Carrero in 1973, and the overthrow of the neighbouring Portuguese regime in 1974.

== Assassination ==
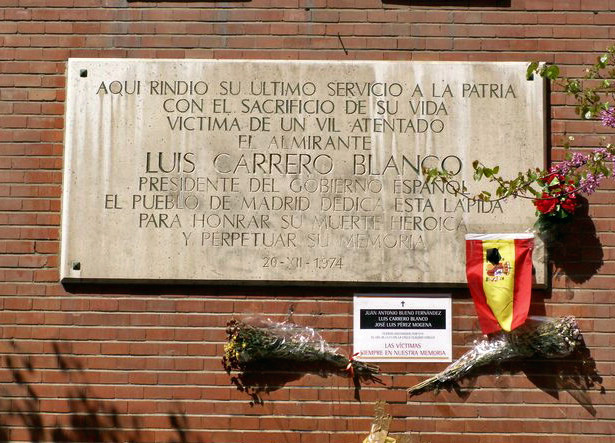
Memorial plaque at the place of the assassination of Admiral Luis Carrero Blanco.

Six months after being named prime minister, Carrero Blanco was assassinated on 20 December 1973 in Madrid by four members of an ETA cell, who carried out a bombing near San Francisco de Borja Church on Calle de Serrano while he returned from daily mass in a Spanish Dodge 3700.

In a collective interview justifying the attack, the ETA bombers said:

The execution in itself had an order and some clear objectives. From the beginning of 1951 Carrero Blanco practically occupied the government headquarters. Carrero Blanco symbolized better than anyone else the figure of "pure Francoism" and without totally linking himself to any of the Francoist tendencies, he covertly attempted to push Opus Dei into power. A man without scruples conscientiously mounted his own state within the State: he created a network of informers within the ministries, in the Army, in the Falange, and also in Opus Dei. His police managed to put themselves into all the Francoist apparatus. Thus he made himself the key element of the system and a fundamental piece of the oligarchy's political game. On the other hand, he came to be irreplaceable for his experience and capacity to manoeuvre and because nobody managed as he did to maintain the internal equilibrium of Francoism.

— Julen Agirre, Operation Ogro: The Execution of Admiral Luis Carrero Blanco

The assassination enjoyed the tacit approval of many Spaniards, who joked about Carrero being Spain's first astronaut.

In his first speech to the Cortes on 12 February 1974, Carrero Blanco's successor as prime minister, Carlos Arias Navarro, promised liberalizing reforms including the right to form political associations. Though he was denounced by Falangists, the transition had begun.

=== Reprisal ===
One of the members of the cell who had assassinated Carrero Blanco was himself assassinated by a car bomb in southern France on 21 December 1978 by a special team organized within the Navy. This group included a member of the Higher Centre of Defense Information secret service, another from the Naval Intelligence Service and the other belonged to the Defense High Command. In addition, it received assistance from a number of right-wing paramilitary groups through Jean-Pierre Cherid (OAS), José María Boccardo (Argentine Anticommunist Alliance) and Mario Ricci (Avanguardia Nazionale).

Argala, the codename by which the ETA member was known, was the only one who could identify the source who had handed Carrero Blanco's schedule and itinerary over to ETA. According to Leonidas, a former member of the Spanish Army who participated in the bombing against Argala, "The explosives came from a US base. I don't remember exactly if it was from Torrejón or Rota, but I do know that the Americans did not know what they would be used for. It was a personal favour for Pedro el Marino" (Pedro Martínez) who provided the explosives. Argala's assassination was claimed by the Spanish Basque Battalion. However, according to Leonidas, "BVE, ATE" (Anti-Terrorismo ETA) or "Triple A" are only labels of convenience that are used by the same group.

=== Funeral and burial ===
Carrero Blanco's funeral, which would be one of Franco's last public appearances, was held the following day at the Basilica of Saint Francis the Great, Madrid and he was buried at Mingorrubio Cemetery in the neighbouring municipality of El Pardo, where Franco himself would be relocated in 2019. Carrero was posthumously elevated to "Captain general of the Navy" and declared "Duke of Carrero Blanco".

== Ideology and positions ==
Carrero did not clearly belong to any family within the regime. His ultimate identification was with the work of the Dictator; as such, he can be considered a pure Francoist. Antonio Elorza described the most distinct features of his ideology as being counter-revolution, anticommunism and satanization of Masonry, all according to a conspiracy theory of history, in line with a "degraded Augustinianism".

Also known for his antisemitic diatribes, by 1941 he saw the state of affairs of a world at war as follows: "Spain, paladin of the Faith in Christ, is again (acting) against the true enemy: Judaism... Because the world, even if it does not look like it, lives in a permanent war of a religious type; it is the struggle of Christianity against Judaism. War to the death, as the fight of good against evil should be."

Carrero, who held paternalist views when assessing the Spanish presence in Africa, was hostile to the acceptance of the decolonisation process. As he declared that the Western Sahara "had not ever been controlled by the Moroccan Empire", he defended that the territory was "as Spanish as the province of Cuenca is".

Openly Germanophile in his articles written for the Mundo magazine during the first part of World War II, after the turn in the conflict against the Axis powers in 1943, he modulated his hostile discourse towards the Allied Powers in those pieces; finally, after the defeat of the Axis, he had wholly replaced the message attacking the liberal democracies by a merely anti-Soviet one. A defender of the idea that the victory of the Francoist side in the Civil War had happened "despite" an alleged international conspiracy against the former, years later, in the 1950s, he insisted again: "this is precisely the Spanish problem, Spain wants to implement the Good, and the forces of Evil, unleashed upon the world, try to prevent her from doing it".

He was among the endorsers of "Proyecto Islero", Spain's attempted program to develop nuclear weapons.

Regarding the future of a post-Franco Spain, Carrero, along with López Rodó, envisaged and promoted the idea of an authoritarian monarchy guaranteeing the continuity of Francoism.

== Service summary ==
=== Orders, decorations and medals ===
Coat of arms of the Dukedom of Carrero Blanco

==== Military ====
- Grand Cross of Naval Merit with white distinction (1943)
- Grand Official of the Order of Africa (1961)
- Grand Cross of Military Merit with white distinction (1963)
- Grand Cross of Aeronautical Merit with white distinction (1967)

==== Civil ====
- Grand Collar of the Imperial Order of the Yoke and Arrows (1939)
- Grand Cross of the Order of Isabella the Catholic (1942)
- Grand Cross of the Order of Charles III (1970)
- Grand Collar of the Order of Cisneros (1970)

==== Nobiliary ====
- 1st Duke of Carrero Blanco, Grandee of Spain (1973)

== Works ==
Carrero Blanco wrote a number of books on the Spanish navy and Spanish naval military history, as well as political treatises on Communism and Freemasonry (under the pseudonym Juan de la Cosa).

- Las Baleares durante la Guerra de América en el siglo XVIII (Paris, 1933) (in French)
- España y el mar (Editora Nacional, Madrid, 1941) (in Spanish)
- Cinematica aeronaval (Editorial Naval, Madrid, 1941) (in Spanish)
- Arte naval miltar: El buque de guerra (de la galera al portaaviones) Vol. II (Editora Naval, Madrid, 1943) (in Spanish)
- La guerra aeronaval en el Atlántico y en el Ártico (Ediciones Idea, Madrid, 1947) (in Spanish)
- La guerra aeronaval en el Mediterráneo y en el Pacífico (Ediciones Idea, Madrid, 1947) (in Spanish)
- La victoria del Cristo de Lepanto (Editora Nacional, Barcelona, 1948) (in Spanish)
- Lepanto (1571–1971) (Salvat Editorial / Alianza Editorial, 1971) (in Spanish)
- Juan de la Cosa, La gran baza soviética (Semana Gráfica, Valencia, 1949) (in Spanish)
- Juan de la Cosa, Las doctrinas del Komsomol (Semana Gráfica, Valencia, 1950) (in Spanish)
- Juan de la Cosa, España ante el mundo: proceso de un aislamiento (Ediciones Idea, Madrid, 1950) (in Spanish)
- Juan de la Cosa, Gibraltar (Semana Gráfica, Valencia, 1952) (in Spanish)
- Juan de la Cosa, Las modernas torres de Babel (Ediciones Idea, 1956) (in Spanish)
- Juan de la Cosa, Comentarios de un español; Las tribulaciones de don Prudencio; Diplomacia subterránea (Fuerza Nueva, Madrid, 1973) (in Spanish)

== See also ==
- Cassandra case, student prosecuted for posting a series of tweets poking fun at the assassination of Luis Carrero Blanco

Political offices
Preceded by Francisco Franco Bahamonde	President of the Government of Spain; 1973	Succeeded by Torcuato Fernández-Miranda (acting)
