= Antonio Carro Martínez =

Spanish politician (1923–2020)

Member of the Cortes Franquistas
- In office 31 May 1961 – 23 December 1975
- Succeeded by: Alfonso Osorio

Member of the Congress of Deputies for Lugo
- In office 11 July 1977 – 21 November 1989

Representative of the Parliamentary Assembly of the Council of Europe for Spain
- In office 24 January 1983 – 6 October 1983

Substitute of the Parliamentary Assembly of the Council of Europe for Spain
- In office 26 September 1984 – 4 October 1984

Representative of the Parliamentary Assembly of the Council of Europe for Spain
- In office 28 January 1985 – 25 September 1986

Personal details
- Born: 3 May 1923 Lugo, Spain
- Died: 10 April 2020 (aged 96) Madrid, Spain
- Party: FET y de las JONS; AP
- Occupation: Politician

Antonio Carro Martínez (3 May 1923 – 10 April 2020) was a Spanish politician. He was in the Minister of the Presidency for Francisco Franco's 5th and final government.
