= Minister of the Presidency =

Head of the Spanish Ministry of the Presidency

- Coat of arms of Spain

- Standard used by government officials

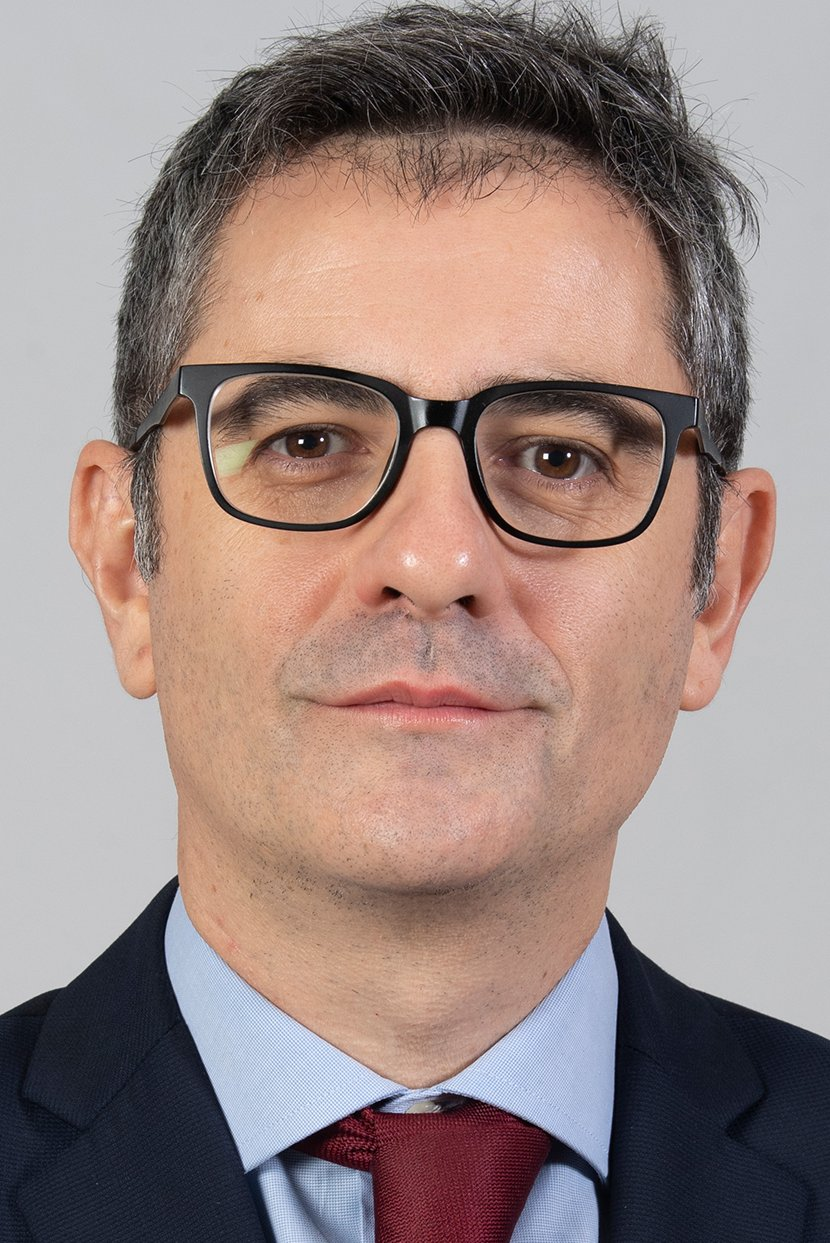
- Incumbent; Félix Bolaños since 12 July 2021
- Ministry of the Presidency
- Style: The Most Excellent (formal); Mr. Minister (informal)
- Member of: Council of Ministers; National Security Council; General Commission of Secretaries of State and Undersecretaries
- Nominator: The Prime Minister
- Appointer: The Monarch; countersigned by the prime minister
- Term length: No fixed term
- Precursor: Under-Secretary of the Presidency
- Formation: July 19, 1951; 75 years ago
- First holder: Luis Carrero Blanco; Minister-Under Secretary
- Website: www.mpr.gob.es

The minister of the presidency, previously the minister-under secretary of the presidency, is a member of the Spanish Council of Ministers and the head of the Ministry of the Presidency, Justice and Relations with the Cortes. As the closest minister to the prime minister, they are responsible for supporting the head of government, preparing the government's legislative programme and ensuring its implementation, authorizing the use of national symbols, and attending the government's collegial bodies. Furthermore, the minister also has assigned powers in matters of justice, as well as the exercise of the right to freedom of religion.

The presidency minister is appointed by the monarch, on the advice of the prime minister. Since July 2021, Félix Bolaños, from the Spanish Socialist Workers' Party, has served as minister of the presidency, justice and relations with the Cortes.

== Secretary of the Council of Ministers ==
Currently, in addition to the general functions of supporting and assisting the Government and its head, specifically, according to Article 18.1 of the 1997 Government Law, the Minister of the Presidency is responsible for serving as Secretary of the Council of Ministers. This function has been performed by the presidency minister since the approval of the Decree-Law of 19 July 1951, which reorganized the Central State Administration, until the present day, with the exception of the period between 1967 and 1973, when the Minister of Information and Tourism acted as Secretary of the Council, as it was considered at that time that the position of Deputy Prime Minister—which was then held by presidency minister Luis Carrero Blanco—was incompatible with that of Secretary of the Council.

As secretary of the Council of Ministers, the minister is responsible for taking minutes of the Council meetings and for keeping and safeguarding them. The Minister-Secretary si assisted by the Government Secretariat.

Likewise, Royal Decree 181/2008, of February 8, on the organization of the official journal "Boletín Oficial del Estado" establishes that the Secretary of the Council is the official authorized to order the publication in the gazette of the royal decree-laws, and only these, since the order of publication of laws corresponds to the Monarch (Note: Article 91 of the 1978 Spanish Constitution) and, the rest of the provisions and acts, to the senior officials or authorities who hold the representation of the body or department that issues them.

Finally, the Minister of the Presidency chairs the meetings of the General Commission of Secretaries of State and Undersecretaries, the body responsible for preparing for the Council of Ministers meetings, unless this responsibility is assigned to a Deputy Prime Minister. As of 2026, this responsibility belonges to the minister.

== History ==
The position was established on 19 July 1951 by Francisco Franco, who granted the then Under-Secretary of the Presidency, Luis Carrero Blanco, the rank of minister, making him Minister-Under Secretary of the Presidency. Carrero Blanco held the position until June 1973 when, after separating the positions of prime minister and head of state, the dictator appointed him prime minister.

During the premiership of The Marquess of Arias Navarro, the Law 1/1974, of January 2, came into force, which divided the position of Minister-Undersecretary into two: the Minister of the Presidency and the Under-Secretary of the Presidency, a subordinate.

Since then, the trend has continued for the Minister of the Presidency to be a close associate or confidant of the Prime Minister, as this person serves as the prime minister's principal assistant and the one through whom the prime minister coordinates the various ministerial departments. This is why, since Carrero Blanco held the position between 1967 and 1973, many other Ministers of the Presidency have also served as Deputy Prime Minister, such as Alfonso Osorio (1976–1977, Second Deputy Prime Minister), Francisco Álvarez-Cascos (1996–2000), Mariano Rajoy (2000–2001 and 2002–2003), Javier Arenas (2003–2004, as Second Deputy Prime Minister), María Teresa Fernández de la Vega (2004–2010), Soraya Sáenz de Santamaría (2011–2018), and Carmen Calvo (2018–2021).

== List of ministers ==
Name	Start	End	Duration	Party	Government		Ref.
Luis Carrero Blanco (1904–1973)	19 July 1951	8 June 1973	21 years, 324 days	National Movement	Franco IV	Francisco Franco (1939–1975)	
Luis Carrero Blanco (1904–1973)	19 July 1951	8 June 1973	21 years, 324 days	National Movement	Franco V	Francisco Franco (1939–1975)	
Luis Carrero Blanco (1904–1973)	19 July 1951	8 June 1973	21 years, 324 days	National Movement	Franco VI	Francisco Franco (1939–1975)	
Luis Carrero Blanco (1904–1973)	19 July 1951	8 June 1973	21 years, 324 days	National Movement	Franco VII	Francisco Franco (1939–1975)	
Luis Carrero Blanco (1904–1973)	19 July 1951	8 June 1973	21 years, 324 days	National Movement	Franco VIII	Francisco Franco (1939–1975)	
José María Gamazo (1929–2015)	11 June 1973	3 January 1974	206 days	National Movement	Luis Carrero Blanco†	Francisco Franco (1939–1975)	
José María Gamazo (1929–2015)	11 June 1973	3 January 1974	206 days	National Movement	The Duke of Fernández-Miranda (acting)	Francisco Franco (1939–1975)	
José María Gamazo (1929–2015)	11 June 1973	3 January 1974	206 days	National Movement	The Marquess of Arias Navarro	Francisco Franco (1939–1975)	
Antonio Carro Martínez (1923–2020)	3 January 1974	11 December 1975	1 year, 342 days	National Movement	The Marquess of Arias Navarro	Francisco Franco (1939–1975)	
Antonio Carro Martínez (1923–2020)	3 January 1974	11 December 1975	1 year, 342 days	National Movement	The Marquess of Arias Navarro	Juan Carlos I (1975–2014)	
Alfonso Osorio (1923–2018)	11 December 1975	4 July 1977	1 year, 205 days	National Movement	The Marquess of Arias Navarro	Juan Carlos I (1975–2014)	
Alfonso Osorio (1923–2018)	11 December 1975	4 July 1977	1 year, 205 days	Centrist	The Duke of Suárez	Juan Carlos I (1975–2014)	
José Manuel Otero (born 1940)	4 July 1977	5 April 1979	1 year, 275 days	Centrist	The Duke of Suárez	Juan Carlos I (1975–2014)	
José Pedro Pérez-Llorca (1940–2019)	5 April 1979	2 May 1980	1 year, 27 days	Centrist	The Duke of Suárez	Juan Carlos I (1975–2014)	
Rafael Arias-Salgado (born 1942)	2 May 1980	26 February 1981	300 days	Centrist	The Duke of Suárez	Juan Carlos I (1975–2014)	
Pío Cabanillas Gallas (1923–1991)	26 February 1981	31 August 1981	186 days	Centrist	The Marquess of Ría de Ribadeo	Juan Carlos I (1975–2014)	
Matías Rodríguez Inciarte (born 1948)	31 August 1981	2 December 1982	1 year, 93 days	Centrist	The Marquess of Ría de Ribadeo	Juan Carlos I (1975–2014)	
Javier Moscoso (1934–2025)	2 December 1982	25 July 1986	3 years, 235 days	Socialist	Felipe González	Juan Carlos I (1975–2014)	
Virgilio Zapatero (born 1946)	25 July 1986	13 July 1993	6 years, 353 days	Socialist	Felipe González	Juan Carlos I (1975–2014)	
Alfredo Pérez Rubalcaba (1951–2019)	13 July 1993	5 May 1996	2 years, 297 days	Socialist	Felipe González	Juan Carlos I (1975–2014)	
Francisco Álvarez-Cascos (born 1947)	5 May 1996	28 April 2000	3 years, 359 days	Popular	José María Aznar	Juan Carlos I (1975–2014)	
Mariano Rajoy (born 1955)	28 April 2000	28 February 2001	306 days	Popular	José María Aznar	Juan Carlos I (1975–2014)	
Juan José Lucas (born 1944)	28 February 2001	10 July 2002	1 year, 132 days	Popular	José María Aznar	Juan Carlos I (1975–2014)	
Mariano Rajoy (1955–)	10 July 2002	4 September 2003	1 year, 56 days	Popular	José María Aznar	Juan Carlos I (1975–2014)	
Javier Arenas (born 1957)	4 September 2003	18 April 2004	227 days	Popular	José María Aznar	Juan Carlos I (1975–2014)	
María Teresa Fernández de la Vega (born 1949)	18 April 2004	21 October 2010	6 years, 186 days	Socialist	José Luis Rodríguez Zapatero	Juan Carlos I (1975–2014)	
Ramón Jáuregui (born 1948)	21 October 2010	22 December 2011	1 year, 62 days	Socialist	José Luis Rodríguez Zapatero	Juan Carlos I (1975–2014)	
Soraya Sáenz de Santamaría (born 1971)	22 December 2011	7 June 2018	6 years, 167 days	Popular	Mariano Rajoy	Juan Carlos I (1975–2014)	
Soraya Sáenz de Santamaría (born 1971)	22 December 2011	7 June 2018	6 years, 167 days	Popular	Mariano Rajoy	Felipe VI (2014-present)	
Carmen Calvo (born 1957)	7 June 2018	12 July 2021	3 years, 35 days	Socialist	Pedro Sánchez	Felipe VI (2014-present)	
Félix Bolaños (born 1975)	12 July 2021	Incumbent	5 years, 101 days	Socialist	Pedro Sánchez	Felipe VI (2014-present)	
