= Carmen Calvo =

Spanish politician (born 1957)

The Most Excellent Carmen Calvo
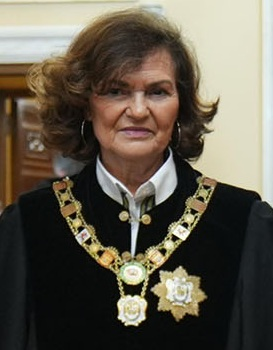
- Carmen Calvo in 2025

74th President of the Council of State
- Incumbent
- Assumed office 28 February 2024
- Monarch: Felipe VI
- Preceded by: Magdalena Valerio

First Deputy Prime Minister of Spain
- In office 7 June 2018 – 12 July 2021 Serving with Nadia Calviño, Yolanda Díaz and Teresa Ribera
- Monarch: Felipe VI
- Prime Minister: Pedro Sánchez
- Preceded by: Soraya Sáenz de Santamaría
- Succeeded by: Nadia Calviño

Minister of the Presidency of Spain (Note: Minister of the Presidency, Relations with the Cortes and Equality from 2018 to 2020 and Minister of the Presidency, Relations with the Cortes and Democratic Memory from 2020 to 2021.) Secretary of the Council of Ministers
- In office 7 June 2018 – 12 July 2021
- Prime Minister: Pedro Sánchez
- Preceded by: Soraya Sáenz de Santamaría
- Succeeded by: Félix Bolaños

Minister of Culture of Spain
- In office 18 April 2004 – 9 July 2007
- Prime Minister: José Luis Rodríguez Zapatero
- Preceded by: Pilar del Castillo
- Succeeded by: César Antonio Molina

Member of the Congress of Deputies
- In office 21 May 2019 – 13 February 2024
- Constituency: Granada (2023–2024); Madrid (2019–2023)
- In office 1 April 2004 – 27 September 2011
- Constituency: Córdoba

Member of the Parliament of Andalusia
- In office 12 March 2000 – 14 March 2004
- Constituency: Córdoba

Personal details
- Born: María del Carmen Calvo Poyato; 9 June 1957 (age 69) Cabra, Córdoba, Spain
- Party: Spanish Socialist Workers Party
- Spouse: Manuel Pérez Yruela (divorced)
- Children: 2
- Occupation: politician; author

María del Carmen Calvo Poyato (born 9 June 1957) is a Spanish politician and author who served as Deputy Prime Minister of Spain and Minister of the Presidency from 2018 to 2021.

Born and raised in Cabra, Spain, she attended the University of Seville and the University of Córdoba; she holds a doctorate in constitutional law from the latter institution. She was Regional Minister of Culture of Andalusia between 1996 and 2004. She also served between 2004 and 2007 as Minister of Culture in the government of José Luis Rodríguez Zapatero. From June 2017 to October 2021, she served as Secretary of Equality of the Socialist Party. She has published several books about feminism and gender equality.

== Early life and education ==
Calvo's primary studies were carried out at a Catholic school and her high school studies at the Aguilar and Eslava High School in the province of Córdoba. She studied law at the University of Seville and got her doctorate in constitutional law in the University of Córdoba.

Calvo took a leave of absence from being professor of constitutional law at the University of Córdoba. At the university, she was Secretary General and vice-dean of the Faculty of Law between 1990 and 1994. From 1992 to 1996 she was secretary of the Andalusian Interuniversity Institute of Criminology.

== Political career ==
Calvo entered politics in the 1990s, when she was appointed Counselor of the Economic and Social Council of Córdoba between 1994 and 1996. She joined the Socialist Workers' Party in 1999.

=== Regional Minister of Culture of Andalusia ===
In April 1996, Calvo was appointed Minister of Culture of the Regional Government of Andalusia under the presidency of Manuel Chaves. Having joined the Socialist Workers' Party in 1999, she was elected MP for Córdoba in the Parliament of Andalusia in 2000. She was in office between her appointment in 1996 until her appointment as Culture Minister of the Government of Spain.

During her eight-years-term as Regional Minister of Culture, Calvo inaugurated the Museo Picasso Málaga of contemporary art in 2003, she negotiated the Andalusian Pact for the Book —a pact for supporting and promoting of reading— and she carried out important investments to reform churches, libraries and theatres —like Maestranza Theatre of Seville— as well as developing the Quality Plan for the Museums of Andalusia —which included the enlargement of the Archelogic Museum of Córdoba.

In 2004 Calvo debuted in the big screen with director José Luis García Sánchez with a short role in the movie María querida.

=== Minister of Culture ===
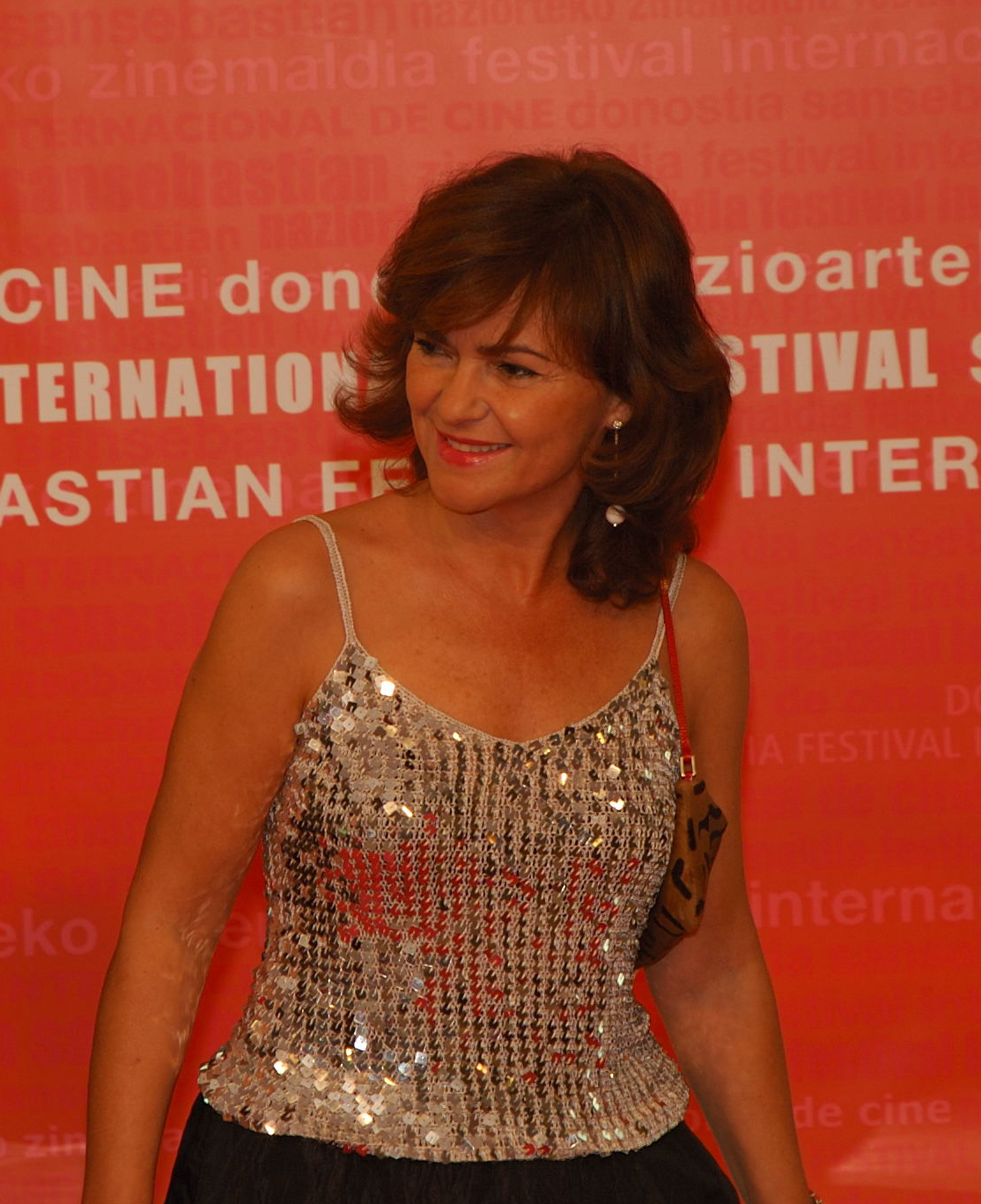
Minister Calvo in the 2006 San Sebastián International Film Festival

In January 2004, she made the leap to national politics when the Secretary-General of the Socialist Workers' Party, Zapatero, created a "committee of notables" to advise him on his run to the premiership and appointed her a member of that committee. In the Spanish general election in March 2004, she was elected to the Congress of Deputies, representing Córdoba. She was subsequently appointed Minister of Culture in April by the new Prime Minister of Spain, José Luis Rodríguez Zapatero.

As Minister of Culture, Calvo was an outspoken opponent of copyright piracy, and in 2005 her department spent around one million euros on a campaign to educate the public about the importance of intellectual property. However, she was criticised by music industry officials for her statement that intellectual property is "not an absolute right". Her decision to transfer documents from the General Archive of the Spanish Civil War to the Autonomous community of Catalonia was controversial.

Because of the bad results of the previous year in the Spanish cinema, in 2007 Calvo presented a draft law that would force movie theaters to show European films (at least a 25%). This was rejected by most of the film industry and they went to strike on 18 June 2007, a strike followed by a 93% of the industry. Minister Calvo was replaced in July 2007 and her successor approved this law with big modifications in late 2007.

She was one of the ministers with worst approval ratings and was replaced in July 2007 by César Antonio Molina.

=== First Vice President of the Congress ===
After leaving the Ministry, Calvo was elected First Vice President of the Congress of Deputies, a position she held until the end of the congressional session.

In the 2008 general election, Calvo was re-elected MP for Córdoba and was appointed Chair of the Congress Committee on Equality, as well as becoming a member of the Congress Committee on Defence and Committee on Comprehensive Disability Policies. She also presided over two subcommittees, one on abortion and other about gender violence.

Calvo did not run for re-election in the 2011 general election due to her disagreement with the choice to put Rosa Aguilar at the top of the electoral list in Córdoba. She returned to her post as professor of constitutional law in the University of Córdoba. She later gained the confidence of Secretary-General of the Socialist Party Pedro Sánchez and in 2017 he appointed her Secretary for Equality of the Socialist Workers' Party.

=== Deputy Prime Minister ===
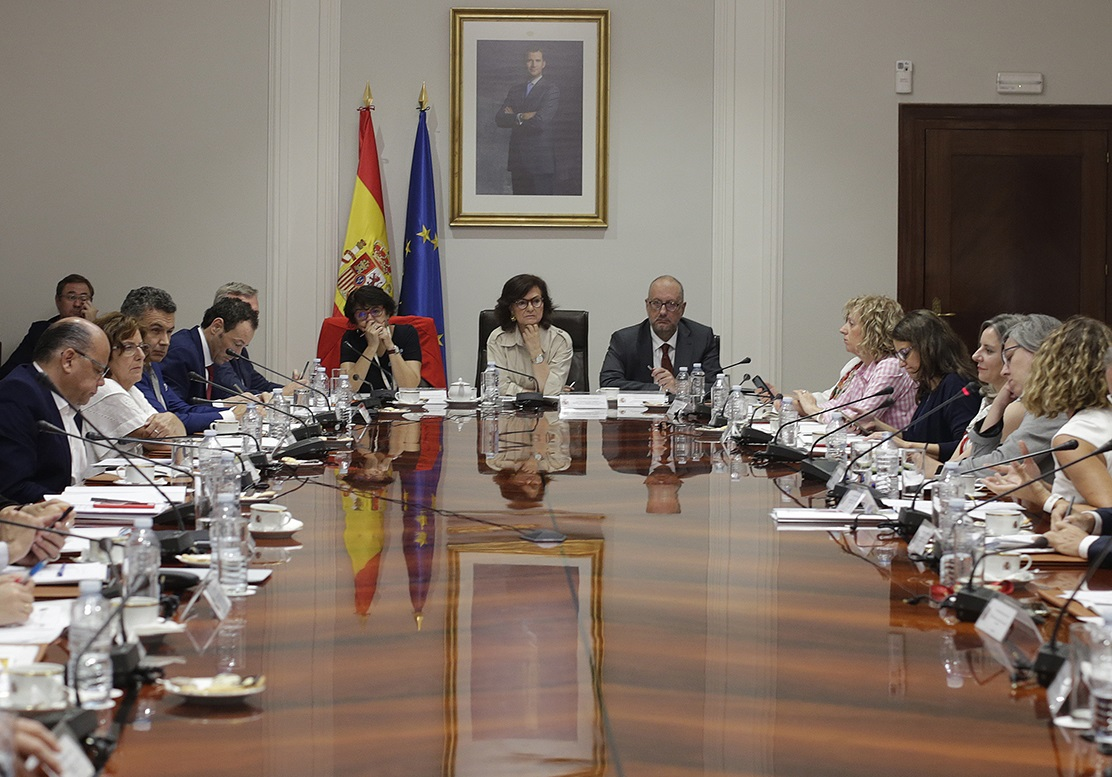
Deputy PM Calvo presiding a meeting about equality

On 5 June 2018 it was announced that Prime Minister Pedro Sánchez would appoint Calvo as Deputy Prime Minister and Minister of the Presidency, Relations with the Cortes and Equality. This was the first time that the Ministry of the Presidency also took the equality portfolio. She was sworn in before the King at Palace of Zarzuela on 7 June 2018.

During her term, Calvo focused on gender-based violence, especially in the wake of the La Manada rape case. In this so-called "wolf pack" case in which a group of men attacked an 18-year-old woman, the Provincial Court of Navarre convicted the men of sexual abuse —nine years in prison— and not for sexual assault or rape —that would mean at least 20 years. The Court's decision provoked widespread social unrest. Calvo proposed a reform of the Criminal Code to include explicit sexual consent. After appealing the sentence, the High Court of Justice of Navarre confirmed the sentence of the provincial court.

In November 2018, Calvo also proposed to amend to the Constitution to exclude some words that can be considered offensive for disabled people and to create a constitutional mandate that specifically protects disabled women. In October 2019, she was an outspoken proponent of exhuming the remains of Francisco Franco from Valle de los Caídos.

On 13 January 2020 she was sworn in again as Deputy Prime Minister and Minister of the Presidency in the Sánchez Second Cabinet, losing the Ministry of Equality in favor of Irene Montero.

In June 2021, Calvo reaffirmed during an interview with La Vanguardia that the pardons of Catalonian independence politicians were near and asked the People's Party not to "confront Catalonia (because) the only alternative was normalizing relations and stop the tremendous confrontation provoked by independentism, the Spanish right and stabilize the situation".

In 2022, a report was issued that claimed that Sánchez offered Calvo the position of President of the Council of State after dismissing her as Vice President of the Government.

== Later career ==
When the Spanish parliament approved the creation of a sick leave for women suffering from incapacitating periods, becoming the first country in Europe to do so, Calvo notably was one of three PSOE lawmakers's who abstained from the vote in February 2023.

== Personal life ==
Calvo is the sister of the politician and writer José Calvo Poyato, former MP of the Parliament of Andalusia and former Mayor of Cabra.

At the age of 19, she married her childhood sweetheart, with whom she had a daughter at the age of 22. She and her daughter share a love for rock music. Subsequently, she married sociologist Manuel Pérez Yruela, former spokesperson of the Regional Government of Andalusia and researcher professor of the Institute of Social Studies of Andalusia. They divorced. She has two granddaughters.

On 25 March 2020, Calvo tested positive for COVID-19 and was hospitalized with a respiratory infection during the first wave of the pandemic. Público announced that Calvo had recovered from the illness in May 2020.

She is a fan of bullfighting.

== Awards and honours ==
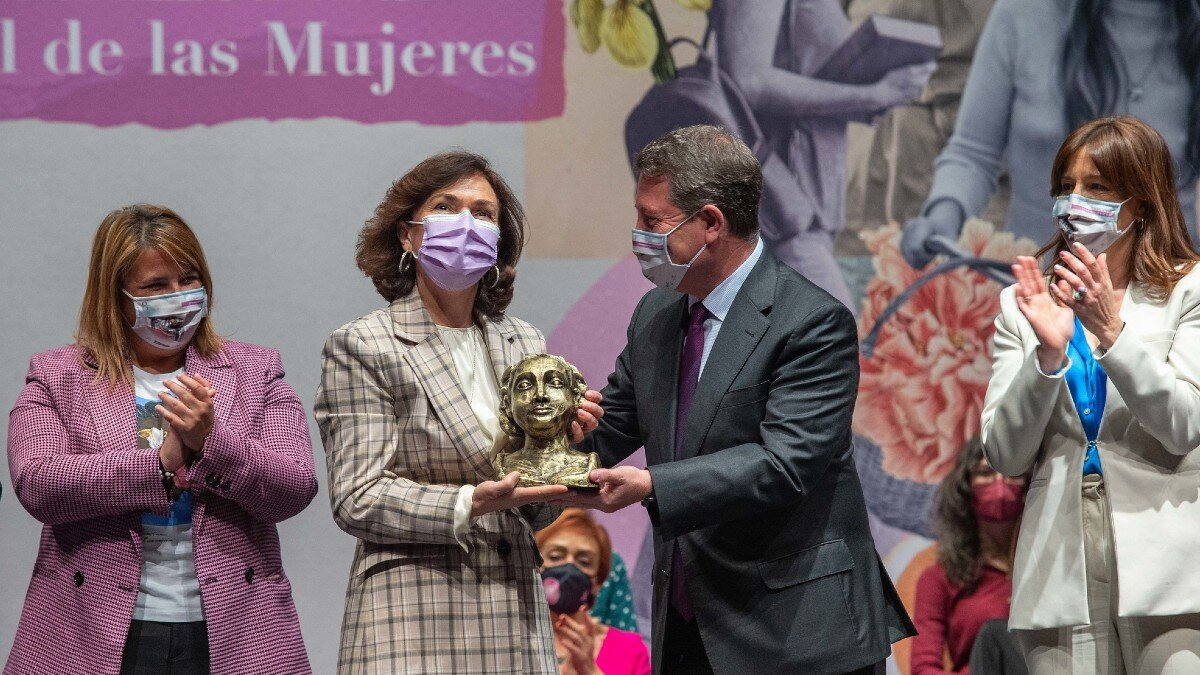
Carmen Calvo, the former Vice President of the Government, receiving the Luisa de Medrano Award (c. 7 March 2022)

- 1998: Fiambrera de Plata, a prize awarded annually by the Athenaeum of Córdoba.
- 2007: Grand Cross of the Order of Charles III. It was granted for being a minister.
- 2008: Favorite Daughter of Cabra, an honorary title given by the City Council of Cabra. She's the first woman to have it.
- 2017: 2017 Progressive Women Award for her outstanding career as a feminist, as well as for her political and personal involvement in the fight for equality. Award given by the Spanish Federation of Progressive Women.
- 2018: Ramón Rubial Award for the defense of socialist values.
- 2022: 'Luisa de Medrano' International Gender Equality Award

== Notes ==
Political offices
Preceded by José María Martín Delgado	Regional Minister of Culture of Andalusia; 1996–2004	Succeeded by Enrique Moratalla Molina
Preceded by Pilar del Castillo (Minister of Education, Culture and Sports)	Minister of Culture; 2004–2007	Succeeded by César Antonio Molina
Preceded by Carme Chacón	First Vice President of the Congress of Deputies; 2007–2008	Succeeded by Teresa Cunillera
Preceded by Soraya Sáenz de Santamaría	Deputy Prime Minister of Spain; 2018–2021	Succeeded by Nadia Calviño
Preceded by Soraya Sáenz de Santamaría (Presidency, and for Territorial Administrations); Dolors Montserrat (Health, Social Services and Equality)	Minister of the Presidency, Relations with the Cortes and Equality; 2018–2021	Succeeded by Félix Bolaños
