= Javier Moscoso =

Spanish politician (1934–2025)

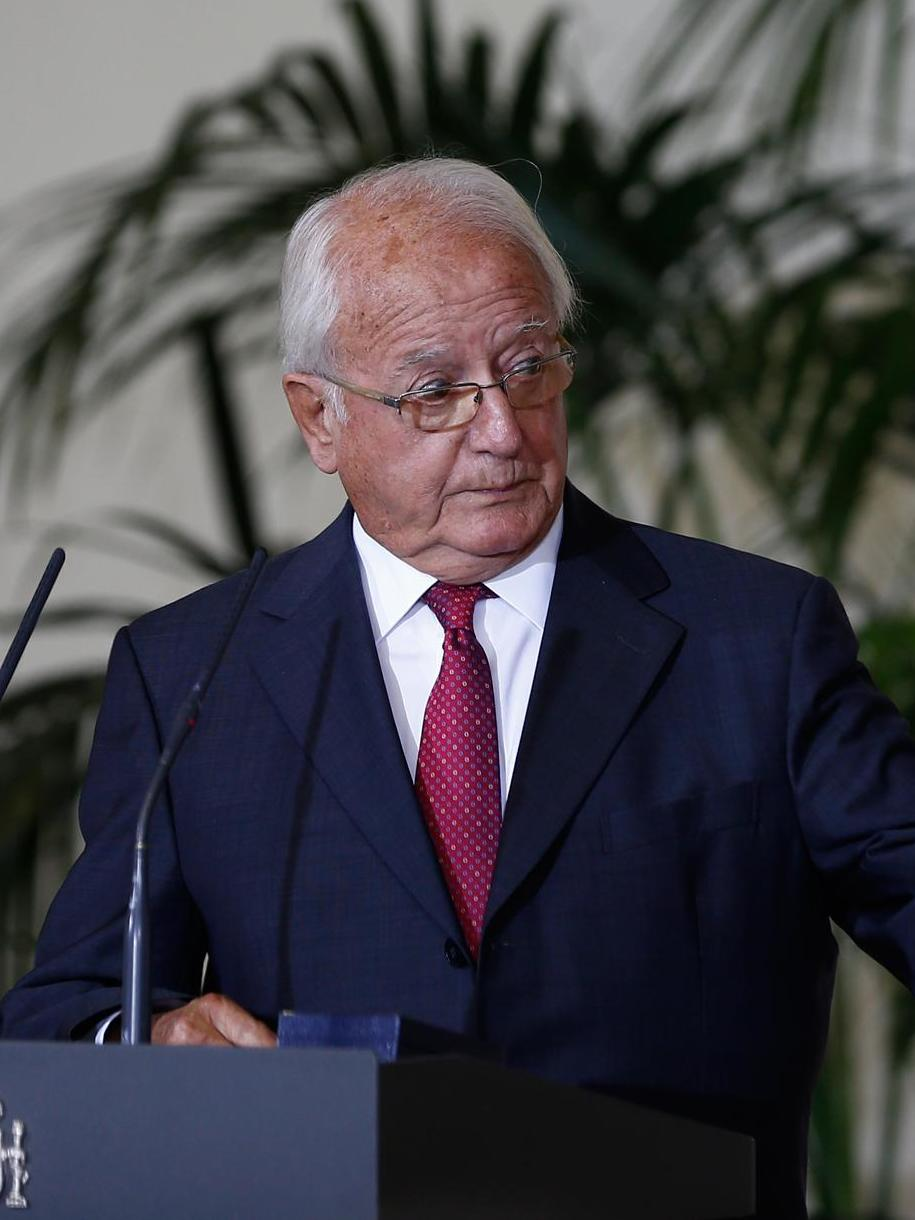

Prosecutor General of the State
- In office 30 September 1986 – 26 January 1990
- Monarch: Juan Carlos I
- Prime Minister: Felipe González
- Preceded by: Luis Antonio Burón Barba
- Succeeded by: Leopoldo Torres Boursault

Minister of the Presidency Secretary of the Council of Ministers
- In office 3 December 1982 – 26 July 1986
- Prime Minister: Felipe González
- Preceded by: Matías Rodríguez Inciarte
- Succeeded by: Virgilio Zapatero (Relations with the Cortes and the Government Secretariat)

Personal details
- Born: Javier Moscoso del Prado y Muñoz; 7 October 1934 Logroño, Spain
- Died: 16 July 2025 (aged 90) Xàtiva, Spain
- Party: Independent politician
- Education: University of Zaragoza

Javier Moscoso del Prado y Muñoz (Spanish: [xaˈβjeɾ mosˈkoso ðel ˈpɾaðoj muˈɲoθ]; 7 October 1934 – 16 July 2025) was a Spanish politician who served as Minister of the Presidency from December 1982 to July 1986 and as Prosecutor General of the State from September 1986 to January 1990. Moscoso died on 16 July 2025, at the age of 90.
