= 13th Congress of Deputies =

Congress of Deputies

←	12th	14th	→
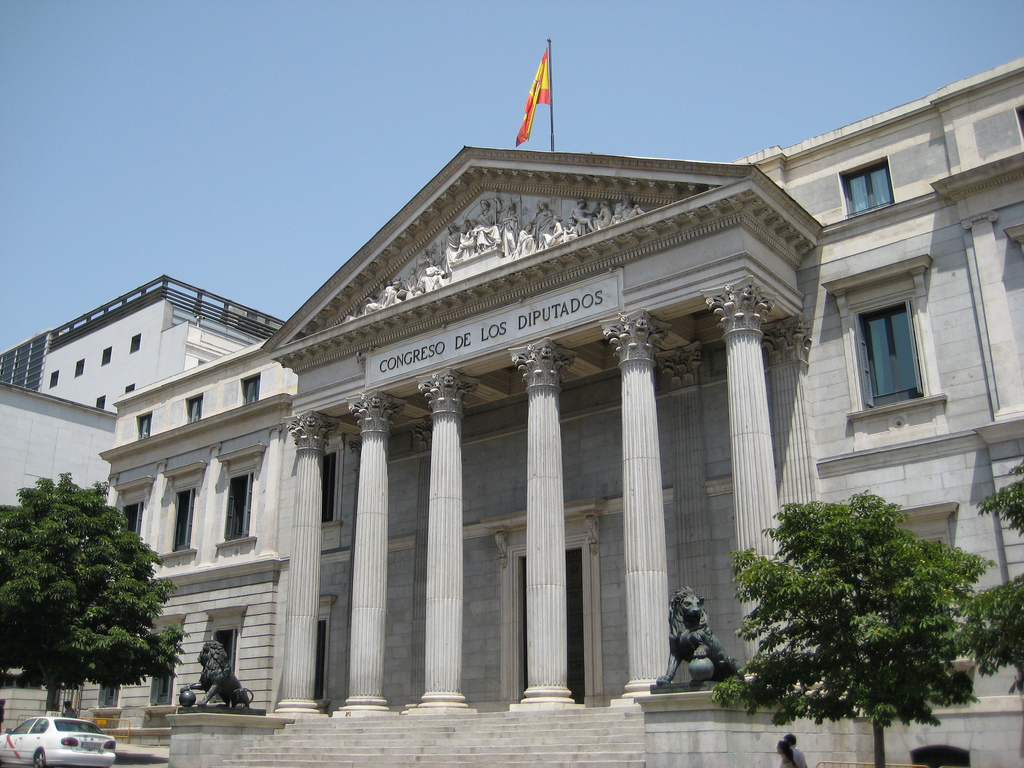

Overview
- Legislative body: Congress of Deputies
- Meeting place: Palacio de las Cortes
- Term: 21 May 2019 – 24 September 2019
- Election: 28 April 2019
- Government: Sánchez
- Website: congreso.es

Deputies
- Members: 350
- President: Meritxell Batet (PSOE)
- First Vice-President: Gloria Elizo (UP)
- Second Vice-President: Alfonso Rodríguez (PSOE)
- Third Vice-President: Ana Pastor (PP)
- Fourth Vice-President: Ignacio Prendes (Cs)
- First Secretary: Gerardo Pisarello (ECP)
- Second Secretary: Sofía Hernanz (PSOE)
- Third Secretary: Adolfo Suárez (PP)
- Fourth Secretary: Patricia Reyes (Cs)

The 13th Congress of Deputies was a meeting of the Congress of Deputies, the lower house of the Spanish Cortes Generales, with the membership determined by the results of the general election held on 28 April 2019. The congress met for the first time on 21 May 2019 and was dissolved prematurely on 24 September 2019.

== Election ==
The 13th Spanish general election under the 1978 Constitution was held on 28 April 2019. It saw the Spanish Socialist Workers' Party (PSOE) became the largest party in the Congress of Deputies for the first time since 2008, but falling short of a majority.

Alliance	Votes	%	Seats	+/−
PSOE	7,513,142	28.67	123	+38
PP	4,373,653	16.69	66	–69
Cs	4,155,665	15.86	57	+25
UP–ECP–EC	3,751,145	14.32	42	–29
Vox	2,688,092	10.26	24	+24
ERC–Sob–ERPV	1,024,628	3.91	15	+6
JxCat–Junts	500,787	1.91	7	–1
EAJ/PNV	395,884	1.51	6	+1
Others/blanks	1,798,375	6.86	10	+5
Total	26,201,371	100.00	350	±0

== History ==
The new congress met for the first time on 21 May 2019 and after two rounds of voting Meritxell Batet (PSOE) was elected as President of the Congress of Deputies with the support of the Unidos Podemos–En Comú Podem (UP–ECP) and various nationalist and regionalist parties.

Other members of the Bureau of the Congress of Deputies were also elected on 21 May 2019: Gloria Elizo (UP), First Vice-President; Alfonso Rodríguez (PSOE), Second Vice-President; Ana Pastor (PP), Third Vice-President; Ignacio Prendes (Cs), Fourth Vice-President; Gerardo Pisarello (ECP), First Secretary; Sofía Hernanz (PSOE), Second Secretary; Adolfo Suárez (PP), Third Secretary; and Patricia Reyes (Cs), Fourth Secretary.

President
Candidate		Votes	
Candidate		Round 1	Round 2
Meritxell Batet	PSOE	175	175
Ana Pastor	PP	67	125
Sara Giménez	Cs	58	—N/a
Ignacio Gil	Vox	24	—N/a
Blank ballots		7	35
Invalid ballots		19	15
Absentees		0	0
Total		350	350

Vice-President
Candidate		Votes
Gloria Elizo	UP	112
Alfonso Rodríguez	PSOE	82
Ana Pastor	PP	70
Ignacio Prendes	Cs	58
Macarena Olona	Vox	24
Blank ballots		0
Invalid ballots		4
Absentees		0
Total		350

Secretary
Candidate		Votes
Gerardo Pisarello	ECP	97
Sofía Hernanz	PSOE	84
Adolfo Suárez	PP	67
Patricia Reyes	Cs	59
Manuel Mariscal	Vox	24
Blank ballots		0
Invalid ballots		19
Absentees		0
Total		350

== Government ==
In July 2019, caretaker Prime Minister Pedro Sánchez (PSOE) failed to secure the necessary votes in congress to form a government after the failure of coalition talks with UP–ECP.

Investiture; Pedro Sánchez (PSOE)
Ballot →	23 July 2019	25 July 2019
Required majority →	176 out of 350	Simple
Yes: • PSOE (123); • PRC (1)	124 / 350	124 / 350
No: • PP (66); • Cs (57); • Vox (24); • ERC (14) (on 23 Jul); • JxCat (4); • CCa (2); • UPN (2); • UP–ECP–GeC (1) (on 23 Jul)	170 / 350	155 / 350
Abstentions: • UP–ECP–GeC (42) (41 on 23 Jul); • ERC (14) (on 25 Jul); • PNV (6); • EH Bildu (4); • Compromís (1)	52 / 350	67 / 350
Absentees: • JxCat (3); • ERC (1)	4 / 350	4 / 350

Unable to obtain enough support in congress to form a government, Sánchez announced on 17 September 2019 that an election would be held on 10 November 2019, the fourth in as many years. The 13th Cortes Generales was formally dissolved on 24 September 2019.

== Deaths, disqualifications, resignations and suspensions ==
The 13th congress has seen the following deaths, disqualifications, resignations and suspensions:

- 24 May 2019 – Jailed Catalan deputies Oriol Junqueras (ERC–Sob), Josep Rull (JxCat), Jordi Sànchez (JxCat) and Jordi Turull (JxCat), currently being tried on charges of rebellion, sedition, criminal organization and misuse of public funds in relation to the Catalan independence referendum and subsequent declaration of independence, are suspended from congress.
- 31 May 2019 – Rafael Catalá (PP) resigned to return to the private sector. He was replaced by María Jesús Bonilla (PP) on 12 June 2019.
- 26 June 2019 – Toni Roldán (Cs) resigned following political disagreement with the Citizens leadership. He was replaced by Carina Mejías (Cs) on 15 July 2019.
- 8 July 2019 – Blanca Fernández (PSOE) resigned after being appointed Minister of Equality of Castilla–La Mancha. She was replaced by Cristina López (PSOE) on 15 July 2019.
- 17 July 2019 – Isabel Blanco (PP) resigned after being appointed Minister of Family and Equal Opportunities of Castile and León. She was replaced by Elvira Velasco (PP) on 19 July 2019.
- 19 August 2019 – Marta Rivera (Cs) resigned after being appointed Minister of Culture and Tourism of the Community of Madrid. She was replaced by María Vilas (Cs) on 29 August 2019.
- 5 September 2019 – Francisco de la Torre (Cs) resigned following political disagreement with the Citizens leadership.

== Members ==
Name	Constituency	No.	Party	Alliance	Group	Took office	Left office	Notes
José Luis Ábalos	Valencia	1	PSPV	PSOE	Socialists	8 May 2019	24 September 2019	
Santiago Abascal	Madrid	1	Vox		Vox	14 May 2019	3 December 2019 (Note: Member of the permanent deputation.)	
José Aceves	Segovia	1	PSCyL	PSOE	Socialists	9 May 2019	24 September 2019	
María Adán	Jaén	1	Cs	Cs	Citizens	13 May 2019	24 September 2019	
Joseba Andoni Agirretxea	Gipuzkoa	1	EAJ/PNV		Basque	14 May 2019	24 September 2019	
Mertxe Aizpurua	Gipuzkoa	1		EH Bildu	Mixed	14 May 2019	3 December 2019	
Javier Alfonso	León	1	PSCyL	PSOE	Socialists	7 May 2019	24 September 2019	
Agustín Almodóbar	Alicante	3	PPCV	PP	People's	8 May 2019	24 September 2019	
María Luisa Alonso	La Rioja	1	Cs	Cs	Citizens	13 May 2019	24 September 2019	
María Olga Alonso	Pontevedra	1	PSdeG	PSOE	Socialists	9 May 2019	24 September 2019	
Jaume Alonso-Cuevillas	Girona	1	Indep.	JxCat	Mixed	16 May 2019	24 September 2019	Aligned to CNxR.
Cayetana Álvarez de Toledo	Barcelona	1	PPC	PP	People's	17 May 2019	3 December 2019	
Carmen Andrés	Barcelona	7	PSC	PSOE	Socialists	9 May 2019	24 September 2019	
Josefa Andrés	Valencia	4	PSPV	PSOE	Socialists	10 May 2019	3 December 2019	
Javier Antón	Soria	1	PSCyL	PSOE	Socialists	8 May 2019	24 September 2019	
Francisco Aranda	Barcelona	6	PSC	PSOE	Socialists	9 May 2019	24 September 2019	
Pablo Arangüena	A Coruña	2	PSdeG	PSOE	Socialists	13 May 2019	3 December 2019	
Inés Arrimadas	Barcelona	1	Cs	Cs	Citizens	16 May 2019	3 December 2019	
María Arteaga	Albacete	1	Indep.	Cs	Citizens	13 May 2019	24 September 2019	
Jaume Asens	Barcelona	1	BEC	ECP	UP–ECP–GEC (Note: Unidos Podemos–En Comú Podem–Galicia en Común.)	14 May 2019	3 December 2019	
Edmundo Bal	Madrid	4	Indep.	Cs	Citizens	8 May 2019	3 December 2019	
Joan Baldoví	Valencia	1	BLOC	Compromís	Mixed	20 May 2019	3 December 2019	
Iñigo Barandiaran	Gipuzkoa	2	EAJ/PNV		Basque	14 May 2019	24 September 2019	
José Bartolomé	Zamora	1	Cs	Cs	Citizens	13 May 2019	24 September 2019	
Montserrat Bassa	Girona	1	Indep.	ERC–Sob	Republican	16 May 2019	3 December 2019	
Meritxell Batet	Barcelona	1	PSC	PSOE	Socialists	9 May 2019	3 December 2019	President.
Ione Belarra	Navarre	1	Podemos	UP	UP–ECP–GEC	13 May 2019	3 December 2019	
Ana Beltrán	Madrid	5	PPCM	PP	People's	14 May 2019	3 December 2019	
Laura Berja	Jaén	2	PSOE–A	PSOE	Socialists	7 May 2019	3 December 2019	
José Antonio Bermúdez	Salamanca	1	PPCyL	PP	People's	16 May 2019	3 December 2019	
Vicente Betoret	Valencia	2	PPCV	PP	People's	7 May 2019	24 September 2019	
María del Mar Blanco	Madrid	9	PPCM	PP	People's	17 May 2019	24 September 2019	
Isabel Blanco	Zamora	1	PPCyL	PP	People's	17 May 2019	17 July 2019	Replaced by Elvira Velasco.
Patricia Blanquer	Alicante	2	PSPV	PSOE	Socialists	8 May 2019	3 December 2019	
María Jesús Bonilla	Cuenca	2	PPCM	PP	People's	12 June 2019	24 September 2019	Replaces Rafael Catalá.
Laura Borràs	Barcelona	2	CNxR	JxCat	Mixed	17 May 2019	3 December 2019	
Isabel María Borrego	Murcia	2	PPRM	PP	People's	9 May 2019	3 December 2019	
Ana Botella	Valencia	2	PSPV	PSOE	Socialists	10 May 2019	24 September 2019	
Eva Bravo	Cádiz	2	PSOE–A	PSOE	Socialists	16 May 2019	24 September 2019	
Eva Bueno	Seville	5	PSOE–A	PSOE	Socialists	20 May 2019	24 September 2019	
Helena Caballero	Valladolid	2	PSCyL	PSOE	Socialists	8 May 2019	24 September 2019	
Tomás Cabezón	Soria	1	PPCyL	PP	People's	7 May 2019	24 September 2019	
María Calderón	Badajoz	1	Cs	Cs	Citizens	13 May 2019	24 September 2019	
María Calva	Cantabria	2	PSC	PSOE	Socialists	10 May 2019	24 September 2019	
Carmen Calvo	Madrid	2	PSOE–M	PSOE	Socialists	13 May 2019	24 September 2019	
Eduardo Calvo	Segovia	1	Indep.	Cs	Citizens	14 May 2019	24 September 2019	
Pablo Cambronero	Seville	1	Cs	Cs	Citizens	17 May 2019	24 September 2019	
Juan Carlos Campo	Cádiz	3	PSOE–A	PSOE	Socialists	14 May 2019	3 December 2019	
Mariana Canales	Cuenca	2	PSCM	PSOE	Socialists	6 May 2019	24 September 2019	
Pilar Cancela	A Coruña	1	PSdeG	PSOE	Socialists	9 May 2019	3 December 2019	
Laia Cañigueral	Girona	3	ERC	ERC–Sob	Republican	16 May 2019	24 September 2019	
Francisco Javier Cano	Cádiz	2	Cs	Cs	Citizens	13 May 2019	24 September 2019	
Zaida Cantera	Madrid	9	PSOE–M	PSOE	Socialists	8 May 2019	24 September 2019	
Joan Capdevila	Barcelona	8	ERC	ERC–Sob	Republican	16 May 2019	24 September 2019	
María Luisa Carcedo	Asturias	2	FSA	PSOE	Socialists	14 May 2019	24 September 2019	
Beatriz Carrillo	Seville	3	PSOE–A	PSOE	Socialists	6 May 2019	24 September 2019	
Pablo Casado	Madrid	1	PPCM	PP	People's	20 May 2019	3 December 2019	
Alberto Casero	Cáceres	1	PPE	PP	People's	10 May 2019	3 December 2019	
Sofía Castañón	Asturias	1	Podemos	UP	UP–ECP–GEC	17 May 2019	24 September 2019	
Rafael Catalá	Cuenca	1	PPCM	PP	People's	20 May 2019	31 May 2019	Replaced by María Jesús Bonilla.
Isabel Celaá	Álava	1	PSE–EE	PSOE	Socialists	16 May 2019	24 September 2019	
Santos Cerdán	Navarre	1	PSN	PSOE	Socialists	14 May 2019	3 December 2019	
Ricardo Chamorro	Ciudad Real	1	Vox		Vox	17 May 2019	24 September 2019	
Óscar Clavell	Castellón	1	PPCV	PP	People's	13 May 2019	24 September 2019	
Luis Clemente	Cantabria	1	PSC	PSOE	Socialists	10 May 2019	3 December 2019	
Magdalena Contestí	Balearic Islands	1	Vox		Vox	17 May 2019	24 September 2019	
Beatriz Corredor	Madrid	8	PSOE–M	PSOE	Socialists	16 May 2019	24 September 2019	
Ismael Cortés	Tarragona	1		ECP	UP–ECP–GEC	13 May 2019	24 September 2019	
Juan José Cortés	Huelva	1	PPA	PP	People's	9 May 2019	24 September 2019	
Rafaela Crespín	Córdoba	2	PSOE–A	PSOE	Socialists	16 May 2019	3 December 2019	
María Cruz-Guzmán	Seville	2	PPA	PP	People's	14 May 2019	24 September 2019	
Juan Cuatrecasas	La Rioja	2	PSR	PSOE	Socialists	17 May 2019	24 September 2019	
Maria Dantas	Barcelona	5	ERC	ERC–Sob	Republican	16 May 2019	24 September 2019	
Francisco de la Torre	Madrid	6	Cs	Cs	Citizens	10 May 2019	5 September 2019	
Sergio del Campo	Tarragona	1	Cs	Cs	Citizens	8 May 2019	3 December 2019	
Celso Luis Delgado	Ourense	2	PPdeG	PP	People's	8 May 2019	24 September 2019	
Dolores Delgado	Madrid	5	PSOE–M	PSOE	Socialists	8 May 2019	24 September 2019	
Juan Antonio Delgado	Cádiz	2	Podemos	UP	UP–ECP–GEC	10 May 2019	3 December 2019	
María del Moral	Jaén	1	PPA	PP	People's	9 May 2019	24 September 2019	
Rocío de Meer	Almería	1	Vox		Vox	16 May 2019	24 September 2019	
Jaime Eduardo de Olano	Lugo	1	PPdeG	PP	People's	13 May 2019	3 December 2019	
Fernando de Páramo	Barcelona	4	Cs	Cs	Citizens	16 May 2019	3 December 2019	
Marcos de Quinto	Madrid	2	Indep.	Cs	Citizens	10 May 2019	3 December 2019	
Guillermo Díaz	Málaga	1	Cs	Cs	Citizens	13 May 2019	3 December 2019	
Yolanda Díaz	Pontevedra	1	EU	UP	UP–ECP–GEC	16 May 2019	3 December 2019	
Luc Diouf	Las Palmas	2	PSC	PSOE	Socialists	14 May 2019	3 December 2019	
María Domínguez	Cáceres	1	Cs	Cs	Citizens	13 May 2019	24 September 2019	
Pedro Duque	Alicante	1	Indep.	PSOE	Socialists	14 May 2019	24 September 2019	
José Carlos Durán	Málaga	3	PSOE–A	PSOE	Socialists	7 May 2019	24 September 2019	
José Echániz	Madrid	8	PPCM	PP	People's	17 May 2019	3 December 2019	
Pablo Echenique	Zaragoza	1	Podemos	UP	UP–ECP–GEC	9 May 2019	3 December 2019	
Gloria Elizo	Madrid	4	Podemos	UP	UP–ECP–GEC	9 May 2019	3 December 2019	First Vice-President.
Odón Elorza	Gipuzkoa	1	PSE–EE	PSOE	Socialists	14 May 2019	3 December 2019	
Xavier Eritja	Lleida	1	ERC	ERC–Sob	Republican	16 May 2019	3 December 2019	
Beatriz Escudero	Segovia	1	PPCyL	PP	People's	8 May 2019	24 September 2019	
Carolina España	Málaga	2	PPA	PP	People's	14 May 2019	24 September 2019	
José Espejo-Saavedra	Barcelona	3	Cs	Cs	Citizens	13 May 2019	3 December 2019	
Iván Espinosa de los Monteros	Madrid	3	Vox		Vox	16 May 2019	3 December 2019	
Aitor Esteban	Biscay	1	EAJ/PNV		Basque	14 May 2019	3 December 2019	
Cristina Esteban	Valencia	2	Vox		Vox	16 May 2019	24 September 2019	
María Faneca	Huelva	1	PSOE–A	PSOE	Socialists	8 May 2019	3 December 2019	
Andrea Fernández	León	2	PSCyL	PSOE	Socialists	7 May 2019	24 September 2019	
Belén Fernández	Cáceres	1	PSOE–E	PSOE	Socialists	8 May 2019	3 December 2019	
Blanca Fernández	Ciudad Real	1	PSCM	PSOE	Socialists	9 May 2019	8 July 2019	Replaced by Cristina López.
Justo Fernández	León	1	Cs	Cs	Citizens	10 May 2019	24 September 2019	
Pedro Fernández	Zaragoza	1	Vox		Vox	17 May 2019	24 September 2019	
Francisco Fernández-Bravo	Ciudad Real	1	Cs	Cs	Citizens	10 May 2019	24 September 2019	
Sonia Ferrer	Almería	2	PSOE–A	PSOE	Socialists	16 May 2019	24 September 2019	
José Figaredo	Asturias	1	Vox		Vox	16 May 2019	3 December 2019	
Isabel Franco Sánchez	Seville	2	Podemos	UP	UP–ECP–GEC	16 May 2019	24 September 2019	
José Manuel Franco	Madrid	3	PSOE–M	PSOE	Socialists	9 May 2019	3 December 2019	
Maria Freixanet	Barcelona	6	ICV	ECP	UP–ECP–GEC	14 May 2019	24 September 2019	
Diego Gago	Pontevedra	2	PPdeG	PP	People's	16 May 2019	24 September 2019	
Cuca Gamarra	La Rioja	1	PPR	PP	People's	16 May 2019	3 December 2019	
Miguel Ángel Garaulet	Murcia	1	Cs	Cs	Citizens	13 May 2019	24 September 2019	
Mario Garcés	Huesca	1	PPA	PP	People's	10 May 2019	3 December 2019	
Alejandro García	Huelva	1	Podemos	UP	UP–ECP–GEC	13 May 2019	24 September 2019	
Alicia García	Ávila	1	PPCyL	PP	People's	13 May 2019	24 September 2019	
Carlos García	Navarre	2	UPN	NA+	Mixed	13 May 2019	3 December 2019	
Eva García	Málaga	2	IU	UP	UP–ECP–GEC	20 May 2019	3 December 2019	
Isabel García	Valladolid	1	PPCyL	PP	People's	20 May 2019	3 December 2019	
Javier García	Almería	1	PPA	PP	People's	8 May 2019	24 September 2019	
Joaquín María García	Lugo	2	PPdeG	PP	People's	13 May 2019	24 September 2019	
Maribel García	Badajoz	2	PSOE–E	PSOE	Socialists	9 May 2019	24 September 2019	
María Montserrat García	A Coruña	3	PSdeG	PSOE	Socialists	9 May 2019	24 September 2019	
Maria del Mar Garcia	Barcelona	3	Podemos	ECP	UP–ECP–GEC	20 May 2019	24 September 2019	
Roberto García	Asturias	3	FSA	PSOE	Socialists	17 May 2019	24 September 2019	
Teodoro García	Murcia	1	PPRM	PP	People's	20 May 2019	3 December 2019	
Valentín García	Badajoz	1	PSOE–E	PSOE	Socialists	13 May 2019	3 December 2019	
María José García-Pelayo	Cádiz	1	PPA	PP	People's	9 May 2019	24 September 2019	
Pilar Garrido	Gipuzkoa	1	Podemos	UP	UP–ECP–GEC	10 May 2019	24 September 2019	
Ignacio Garriga	Barcelona	1	Vox		Vox	17 May 2019	3 December 2019	
Alberto Garzón	Málaga	1	CPA	UP	UP–ECP–GEC	20 May 2019	3 December 2019	
Paloma Gázquez	Asturias	1	PPA	PP	People's	7 May 2019	24 September 2019	
Ignacio Gil	Valencia	1	Vox		Vox	17 May 2019	3 December 2019	
Laura Giménez	Madrid	3	Indep.	Cs	Citizens	9 May 2019	3 December 2019	
Juan Carlos Girauta	Toledo	1	Cs	Cs	Citizens	14 May 2019	3 December 2019	
Héctor Gómez	Santa Cruz de Tenerife	1	PSC	PSOE	Socialists	14 May 2019	3 December 2019	
Marcial Gómez	Córdoba	1	Cs	Cs	Citizens	13 May 2019	3 December 2019	
Rodrigo Gómez	Zaragoza	1	Cs	Cs	Citizens	14 May 2019	3 December 2019	
Rubén Gómez	Cantabria	1	Cs	Cs	Citizens	13 May 2019	24 September 2019	
Gerard Gómez del Moral	Barcelona	6	ERC	ERC–Sob	Republican	20 May 2019	24 September 2019	
Antonio Gómez-Reino	A Coruña	1	Podemos	UP	UP–ECP–GEC	17 May 2019	3 December 2019	
Antonio Pablo González	Madrid	7	PPCM	PP	People's	13 May 2019	3 December 2019	
Ariagona González	Las Palmas	3	PSC	PSOE	Socialists	14 May 2019	24 September 2019	
Manuel González	Albacete	1	PSCM	PSOE	Socialists	8 May 2019	3 December 2019	
María del Carmen González	León	1	PPCyL	PP	People's	9 May 2019	24 September 2019	
María Guadalupe González	Santa Cruz de Tenerife	2	CCa	CCa–PNC	Mixed	8 May 2019	24 September 2019	
Marta González	A Coruña	1	PPdeG	PP	People's	8 May 2019	3 December 2019	
Miguel González	Ciudad Real	2	PSCM	PSOE	Socialists	9 May 2019	24 September 2019	
Josune Gorospe	Biscay	3	EAJ/PNV		Basque	14 May 2019	24 September 2019	
Miren Gorrotxategi	Biscay	2	Podemos	UP	UP–ECP–GEC	10 May 2019	24 September 2019	
Fernando Grande-Marlaska	Cádiz	1	PSOE–A	PSOE	Socialists	16 May 2019	24 September 2019	
Inés Granollers	Lleida	2	ERC	ERC–Sob	Republican	16 May 2019	24 September 2019	
Sònia Guerra	Barcelona	9	PSC	PSOE	Socialists	9 May 2019	24 September 2019	
María Guijarro	Biscay	2	PSE–EE	PSOE	Socialists	13 May 2019	3 December 2019	
Txema Guijarro	Alicante	1	Podemos	UP	UP–ECP–GEC	14 May 2019	3 December 2019	
Lourdes Guillén	Huesca	1	Cs	Cs	Citizens	13 May 2019	24 September 2019	
Lídia Guinart	Barcelona	5	PSC	PSOE	Socialists	9 May 2019	24 September 2019	
José Guirao	Almería	1	PSOE–A	PSOE	Socialists	14 May 2019	24 September 2019	
Fernando Gutiérrez	Melilla	1	PP	PP	People's	8 May 2019	24 September 2019	
Miguel Ángel Gutiérrez	Madrid	7	Cs	Cs	Citizens	8 May 2019	3 December 2019	
Sergio Gutiérrez	Toledo	1	PSCM	PSOE	Socialists	13 May 2019	3 December 2019	
Carlos Hermoso	Huelva	1	Cs	Cs	Citizens	13 May 2019	24 September 2019	
Manuel Hernández	Ávila	1	Cs	Cs	Citizens	13 May 2019	24 September 2019	
María del Carmen Hernández	Las Palmas	2	PPC	PP	People's	16 May 2019	24 September 2019	
Roberto Hernández	Madrid	8	Cs	Cs	Citizens	13 May 2019	24 September 2019	
Sofía Hernanz	Balearic Islands	2	PSIB	PSOE	Socialists	14 May 2019	3 December 2019	Second Secretary.
José Alberto Herrero	Teruel	1	PPA	PP	People's	9 May 2019	24 September 2019	
Francisco Hervías	Granada	1	Cs	Cs	Citizens	14 May 2019	3 December 2019	
Pedro Honrubia	Granada	1	Podemos	UP	UP–ECP–GEC	14 May 2019	24 September 2019	
Belén Hoyo	Valencia	1	PPCV	PP	People's	16 May 2019	3 December 2019	
Pablo Iglesias	Madrid	1	Podemos	UP	UP–ECP–GEC	17 May 2019	3 December 2019	
Héctor Illueca	Valencia	1	Podemos	UP	UP–ECP–GEC	14 May 2019	24 September 2019	
Jon Iñarritu	Gipuzkoa	2		EH Bildu	Mixed	14 May 2019	24 September 2019	
José Izquierdo	Valladolid	1	PSCyL	PSOE	Socialists	7 May 2019	3 December 2019	
Teresa Jiménez-Becerril	Seville	1	PPA	PP	People's	16 May 2019	24 September 2019	
Antonia Jover	Balearic Islands	1	Podemos	UP	UP–ECP–GEC	17 May 2019	24 September 2019	
María Sandra Juliá	Castellón	1	Cs	Cs	Citizens	13 May 2019	24 September 2019	
Oriol Junqueras	Barcelona	1	ERC	ERC–Sob	Mixed	20 May 2019	24 September 2019	Suspended from 24 May 2019.
Marc Lamuà	Girona	1	PSC	PSOE	Socialists	9 May 2019	3 December 2019	
Adriana Lastra	Asturias	1	FSA	PSOE	Socialists	8 May 2019	3 December 2019	
Isaura Leal	Madrid	11	PSOE–M	PSOE	Socialists	9 May 2019	3 December 2019	
Mikel Legarda	Álava	1	EAJ/PNV		Basque	14 May 2019	3 December 2019	
Fuensanta Lima	Málaga	2	PSOE–A	PSOE	Socialists	7 May 2019	24 September 2019	
Cristina López	Ciudad Real	3	PSCM	PSOE	Socialists	15 July 2019	24 September 2019	Replaces Blanca Fernández.
Ignacio López	Málaga	1	PSOE–A	PSOE	Socialists	8 May 2019	3 December 2019	
Patxi López	Biscay	1	PSE–EE	PSOE	Socialists	13 May 2019	3 December 2019	
Sonsoles López	Lugo	2	PSdeG	PSOE	Socialists	9 May 2019	24 September 2019	
Ignacio López-Bas	Alicante	2	Cs	Cs	Citizens	13 May 2019	24 September 2019	
Juan López de Uralde	Álava	1	Equo	UP	UP–ECP–GEC	10 May 2019	24 September 2019	
Andrés Lorite	Córdoba	1	PPA	PP	People's	10 May 2019	24 September 2019	
Roser Maestro	Valencia	2	EUPV	UP	UP–ECP–GEC	8 May 2019	24 September 2019	
Elena Máñez	Las Palmas	1	PSC	PSOE	Socialists	16 May 2019	24 September 2019	
Milagros Marcos	Palencia	1	PPCyL	PP	People's	9 May 2019	24 September 2019	
Joan Margall	Girona	2	ERC	ERC–Sob	Republican	16 May 2019	24 September 2019	
Pau Marí-Klose	Zaragoza	2	PSA	PSOE	Socialists	16 May 2019	24 September 2019	
Guillermo Mariscal	Las Palmas	1	PPC	PP	People's	9 May 2019	3 December 2019	
Manuel Mariscal	Toledo	1	Vox		Vox	16 May 2019	24 September 2019	
Reyes Maroto	Madrid	6	PSOE–M	PSOE	Socialists	13 May 2019	24 September 2019	
María Márquez	Seville	1	Podemos	UP	UP–ECP–GEC	14 May 2019	24 September 2019	
María Marra	Pontevedra	3	PSdeG	PSOE	Socialists	9 May 2019	24 September 2019	
María Marrodán	La Rioja	1	PSR	PSOE	Socialists	17 May 2019	3 December 2019	
Marta Martín	Alicante	1	Cs	Cs	Citizens	13 May 2019	3 December 2019	
José Martínez	Murcia	2	Cs	Cs	Citizens	13 May 2019	24 September 2019	
María del Carmen Martínez	Cádiz	1	Indep.	Cs	Citizens	17 May 2019	24 September 2019	
María Luz Martínez Seijo	Palencia	1	PSCyL	PSOE	Socialists	9 May 2019	3 December 2019	
María Valentina Martínez	A Coruña	3	PPdeG	PP	People's	9 May 2019	3 December 2019	
Juan José Matarí	Almería	2	PPA	PP	People's	8 May 2019	24 September 2019	
Oskar Matute	Biscay	1	Alternatiba	EH Bildu	Mixed	14 May 2019	24 September 2019	
Soraya Mayo	Valladolid	1	Indep.	Cs	Citizens	9 May 2019	24 September 2019	
Rafael Mayoral	Madrid	5	Podemos	UP	UP–ECP–GEC	13 May 2019	3 December 2019	
José Mazón	Cantabria	1	PRC		Mixed	9 May 2019	3 December 2019	
Guillermo Antonio Meijón	Pontevedra	2	PSdeG	PSOE	Socialists	9 May 2019	3 December 2019	
Carina Mejías	Barcelona	5	Cs	Cs	Citizens	15 July 2019	24 September 2019	Replaces Toni Roldán.
Joan Miquel Mena	Barcelona	5	EUiA	ECP	UP–ECP–GEC	13 May 2019	24 September 2019	
Lourdes Méndez	Murcia	1	Vox		Vox	9 May 2019	24 September 2019	
Joan Mesquida	Balearic Islands	1	Indep.	Cs	Citizens	7 May 2019	3 December 2019	
Manuel Mestre	Alicante	1	Vox		Vox	17 May 2019	24 September 2019	
María Virginia Millán	Seville	2	Cs	Cs	Citizens	14 May 2019	24 September 2019	
Montserrat Mínguez	Lleida	1	PSC	PSOE	Socialists	9 May 2019	3 December 2019	
Sergi Miquel	Girona	2	PDeCAT	JxCat	Mixed	8 May 2019	24 September 2019	
José Mirón	Salamanca	1	Cs	Cs	Citizens	13 May 2019	24 September 2019	
María Sandra Moneo	Burgos	1	PPCyL	PP	People's	16 May 2019	3 December 2019	
Irene Montero	Madrid	2	Podemos	UP	UP–ECP–GEC	14 May 2019	3 December 2019	
María Jesús Montero	Seville	1	PSOE–A	PSOE	Socialists	17 May 2019	24 September 2019	
Macarena Montesinos	Alicante	2	PPCV	PP	People's	16 May 2019	3 December 2019	
Pablo Montesinos	Málaga	1	Indep.	PP	People's	14 May 2019	3 December 2019	
José Montilla	Granada	1	PSOE–A	PSOE	Socialists	13 May 2019	3 December 2019	
Tristana Moraleja	A Coruña	2	PPdeG	PP	People's	8 May 2019	24 September 2019	
Joaquín Moreno	Teruel	1	Cs	Cs	Citizens	13 May 2019	24 September 2019	
Pau Morlà	Balearic Islands	3	PSIB	PSOE	Socialists	6 May 2019	24 September 2019	
María Jesús Moro	Salamanca	2	PPCyL	PP	People's	8 May 2019	24 September 2019	
Diego Movellán	Cantabria	1	PPC	PP	People's	6 May 2019	24 September 2019	
María Moya	Valencia	3	Cs	Cs	Citizens	10 May 2019	24 September 2019	
Lucía Muñoz	Balearic Islands	2	Podemos	UP	UP–ECP–GEC	17 May 2019	24 September 2019	
María Muñoz	Valencia	1	Cs	Cs	Citizens	13 May 2019	3 December 2019	
Aurora Nacarino-Brabo	Burgos	1	Cs	Cs	Citizens	13 May 2019	24 September 2019	
María Narváez	Málaga	4	PSOE–A	PSOE	Socialists	8 May 2019	24 September 2019	
Begoña Nasarre	Huesca	1	PSA	PSOE	Socialists	13 May 2019	3 December 2019	
Carmen Navarro Lacoba	Albacete	1	PPCM	PP	People's	10 May 2019	24 September 2019	
Míriam Nogueras	Barcelona	3	PDeCAT	JxCat	Mixed	17 May 2019	24 September 2019	Aligned to CNxR.
Joan Josep Nuet	Barcelona	4	CC	ERC–Sob	Republican	16 May 2019	3 December 2019	
Macarena Olona	Granada	1	Vox		Vox	8 May 2019	3 December 2019	
Ana Oramas	Santa Cruz de Tenerife	1	CCa	CCa–PNC	Mixed	8 May 2019	3 December 2019	
Marina Ortega	Ourense	1	PSdeG	PSOE	Socialists	8 May 2019	24 September 2019	
Javier Ortega Smith	Madrid	2	Vox		Vox	16 May 2019	3 December 2019	
Esther Padilla	Toledo	2	PSCM	PSOE	Socialists	8 May 2019	24 September 2019	
Ana Pastor	Pontevedra	1	PPdeG	PP	People's	6 May 2019	3 December 2019	Third Vice-President.
Esther Peña	Burgos	1	PSCyL	PSOE	Socialists	13 May 2019	3 December 2019	
Mercè Perea	Barcelona	3	PSC	PSOE	Socialists	9 May 2019	3 December 2019	
Adolfo Pérez	Ourense	2	PSdeG	PSOE	Socialists	7 May 2019	24 September 2019	
María Mercedes Pérez	Madrid	6	Podemos	UP	UP–ECP–GEC	9 May 2019	24 September 2019	
María Teresa Pérez	Alicante	2	Podemos	UP	UP–ECP–GEC	14 May 2019	24 September 2019	
Beatríz Pino	Pontevedra	1	Cs	Cs	Citizens	10 May 2019	24 September 2019	
Víctor Valentín Píriz	Badajoz	1	PPE	PP	People's	6 May 2019	24 September 2019	
Gerardo Pisarello	Barcelona	4	BEC	ECP	UP–ECP–GEC	14 May 2019	3 December 2019	First Secretary.
Meri Pita	Las Palmas	2	Podemos	UP	UP–ECP–GEC	6 May 2019	24 September 2019	
Luis Planas	Córdoba	1	PSOE–A	PSOE	Socialists	13 May 2019	24 September 2019	
Francisco Polo	Barcelona	2	PSC	PSOE	Socialists	9 May 2019	24 September 2019	
Pere Joan Pons	Balearic Islands	1	PSIB	PSOE	Socialists	6 May 2019	3 December 2019	
Ignacio Prendes	Asturias	1	Cs	Cs	Citizens	20 May 2019	3 December 2019	Fourth Vice-President.
Ana Prieto	Lugo	1	PSdeG	PSOE	Socialists	9 May 2019	24 September 2019	
Margarita Prohens	Balearic Islands	1	PPIB	PP	People's	7 May 2019	24 September 2019	
Norma Pujol	Tarragona	2	ERC	ERC–Sob	Republican	16 May 2019	24 September 2019	
Arnau Ramírez	Barcelona	8	PSC	PSOE	Socialists	9 May 2019	24 September 2019	
José Ramírez	Córdoba	1	Vox		Vox	17 May 2019	24 September 2019	
Saúl Ramírez	Las Palmas	1	Cs	Cs	Citizens	13 May 2019	24 September 2019	
Elvira Ramón	Granada	2	PSOE–A	PSOE	Socialists	10 May 2019	24 September 2019	
César Joaquín Ramos	Cáceres	2	PSOE–E	PSOE	Socialists	8 May 2019	24 September 2019	
José Ramos	Huelva	2	PSOE–A	PSOE	Socialists	8 May 2019	24 September 2019	
María Tamara Raya	Santa Cruz de Tenerife	2	PSC	PSOE	Socialists	20 May 2019	24 September 2019	
Germán Renau	Castellón	2	PSPV	PSOE	Socialists	14 May 2019	24 September 2019	
Patricia Reyes	Madrid	5	Cs	Cs	Citizens	9 May 2019	3 December 2019	Fourth Secretary.
Teresa Ribera	Madrid	4	PSOE–M	PSOE	Socialists	16 May 2019	24 September 2019	
Carmen Riolobos	Toledo	2	PPCM	PP	People's	7 May 2019	24 September 2019	
Albert Rivera	Madrid	1	Cs	Cs	Citizens	20 May 2019	3 December 2019	
Irene Rivera	Málaga	2	Cs	Cs	Citizens	14 May 2019	24 September 2019	
Marta Rivera	A Coruña	1	Cs	Cs	Citizens	10 May 2019	19 August 2019	Replaced by María Vilas.
Enrique Rivero	Palencia	1	Cs	Cs	Citizens	13 May 2019	24 September 2019	
Joaquín Robles	Murcia	2	Vox		Vox	16 May 2019	24 September 2019	
Margarita Robles	Ávila	1	Indep.	PSOE	Socialists	9 May 2019	24 September 2019	
Alberto Rodríguez	Santa Cruz de Tenerife	1	Podemos	UP	UP–ECP–GEC	20 May 2019	24 September 2019	
Alfonso Rodríguez	Seville	2	PSOE–A	PSOE	Socialists	13 May 2019	3 December 2019	Second Vice-President.
José Rodríguez	Granada	3	PSOE–A	PSOE	Socialists	14 May 2019	3 December 2019	
Melisa Rodríguez	Santa Cruz de Tenerife	1	Cs	Cs	Citizens	10 May 2019	3 December 2019	
Carlos Rojas	Granada	1	PPA	PP	People's	8 May 2019	3 December 2019	
Toni Roldán	Barcelona	2	Cs	Cs	Citizens	20 May 2019	26 June 2019	Replaced by Carina Mejías.
María Romero	Seville	1	Vox		Vox	17 May 2019	24 September 2019	
Rosa María Romero	Ciudad Real	1	PPCM	PP	People's	13 May 2019	24 September 2019	
María del Mar Rominguera	Zamora	1	PSCyL	PSOE	Socialists	16 May 2019	24 September 2019	
Susana Ros	Castellón	1	PSPV	PSOE	Socialists	14 May 2019	3 December 2019	
María Rosado	Guadalajara	1	Indep.	Cs	Citizens	17 May 2019	3 December 2019	
María Rosell	Las Palmas	1	Podemos	UP	UP–ECP–GEC	7 May 2019	3 December 2019	
Agustín Rosety	Cádiz	1	Vox		Vox	17 May 2019	24 September 2019	
Marta Rosique	Barcelona	7	ERC	ERC–Sob	Republican	16 May 2019	24 September 2019	
Patricia Rueda	Málaga	1	Vox		Vox	17 May 2019	3 December 2019	
Gabriel Rufián	Barcelona	2	ERC	ERC–Sob	Republican	16 May 2019	3 December 2019	
Joan Ruiz	Tarragona	1	PSC	PSOE	Socialists	9 May 2019	24 September 2019	
María Concepción Ruiz	Navarre	2	PSN	PSOE	Socialists	10 May 2019	24 September 2019	
María de la Cabeza Ruiz	Madrid	4	Vox		Vox	16 May 2019	24 September 2019	
Iñaki Ruiz de Pinedo	Álava	1		EH Bildu	Mixed	14 May 2019	24 September 2019	
Josep Rull	Tarragona	1	PDeCAT	JxCat	Mixed	20 May 2019	24 September 2019	Suspended from 24 May 2019.
Marisa Saavedra	Castellón	1	Podemos	UP	UP–ECP–GEC	20 May 2019	24 September 2019	
Pablo Sáez	Valladolid	1	Vox		Vox	16 May 2019	24 September 2019	
Idoia Sagastizabal	Biscay	2	EAJ/PNV		Basque	14 May 2019	24 September 2019	
Luis Carlos Sahuquillo	Cuenca	1	PSCM	PSOE	Socialists	6 May 2019	3 December 2019	
Francisco Salazar	Seville	4	PSOE–A	PSOE	Socialists	8 May 2019	3 December 2019	
Jordi Salvador	Tarragona	1	ERC	ERC–Sob	Republican	20 May 2019	3 December 2019	
César Sánchez	Alicante	1	PPCV	PP	People's	9 May 2019	3 December 2019	
Javier Sánchez	Murcia	1	Podemos	UP	UP–ECP–GEC	14 May 2019	24 September 2019	
Jordi Sànchez	Barcelona	1	CNxR	JxCat	Mixed	20 May 2019	24 September 2019	Suspended from 24 May 2019.
Marisol Sánchez	Murcia	2	PSRM	PSOE	Socialists	9 May 2019	3 December 2019	
Mariano Sánchez	Badajoz	3	PSOE–E	PSOE	Socialists	13 May 2019	24 September 2019	
Pedro Sánchez	Madrid	1	PSOE–M	PSOE	Socialists	17 May 2019	24 September 2019	
Víctor Sánchez	Badajoz	1	Vox		Vox	16 May 2019	3 December 2019	
Herminio Sancho	Teruel	1	PSA	PSOE	Socialists	13 May 2019	24 September 2019	
Luís Santamaría	Valencia	3	PPCV	PP	People's	14 May 2019	24 September 2019	
Enrique Santiago	Madrid	3	IU–M	UP	UP–ECP–GEC	7 May 2019	24 September 2019	
Vicent Sarrià	Valencia	3	PSPV	PSOE	Socialists	14 May 2019	24 September 2019	
Pedro Saura	Murcia	1	PSRM	PSOE	Socialists	10 May 2019	24 September 2019	
Sergio Sayas	Navarre	1	UPN	NA+	Mixed	13 May 2019	24 September 2019	
David Serrada	Salamanca	1	PSCyL	PSOE	Socialists	9 May 2019	3 December 2019	
Juan Francisco Serrano	Jaén	3	PSOE–A	PSOE	Socialists	7 May 2019	24 September 2019	
Yolanda Seva	Alicante	4	PSPV	PSOE	Socialists	13 May 2019	24 September 2019	
Felipe Jesús Sicilia	Jaén	1	PSOE–A	PSOE	Socialists	14 May 2019	3 December 2019	
Rafael Simancas	Madrid	7	PSOE–M	PSOE	Socialists	8 May 2019	3 December 2019	
José Simón	Ceuta	1	PSOE	PSOE	Socialists	17 May 2019	3 December 2019	
Alejandro Soler Mur	Alicante	3	PSPV	PSOE	Socialists	13 May 2019	3 December 2019	
Juan Soto	Murcia	3	PSRM	PSOE	Socialists	9 May 2019	24 September 2019	
Adolfo Suárez	Madrid	2	PPCM	PP	People's	8 May 2019	3 December 2019	Third Secretary.
Eloy Suárez	Zaragoza	1	PPA	PP	People's	7 May 2019	24 September 2019	
Susana Sumelzo	Zaragoza	1	PSA	PSOE	Socialists	13 May 2019	3 December 2019	
Carolina Telechea	Barcelona	3	ERC	ERC–Sob	Republican	16 May 2019	3 December 2019	
Vicente Ten	Valencia	2	Cs	Cs	Citizens	13 May 2019	24 September 2019	
Vicente Tirado	Toledo	1	PPCM	PP	People's	13 May 2019	3 December 2019	
Carla Toscano	Madrid	5	Vox		Vox	17 May 2019	3 December 2019	
Jordi Turull	Lleida	1	PDeCAT	JxCat	Mixed	20 May 2019	24 September 2019	Suspended from 24 May 2019.
Edurne Uriarte	Madrid	3	PPCM	PP	People's	8 May 2019	24 September 2019	
Roberto Uriarte	Biscay	1	Podemos	UP	UP–ECP–GEC	20 May 2019	24 September 2019	
Magdalena Valerio	Guadalajara	1	PSCM	PSOE	Socialists	16 May 2019	24 September 2019	
Silvia Valmaña	Guadalajara	1	PPCM	PP	People's	13 May 2019	24 September 2019	
Ana Belén Vázquez	Ourense	1	PPdeG	PP	People's	8 May 2019	3 December 2019	
María Velarde	Córdoba	1	Podemos	UP	UP–ECP–GEC	14 May 2019	24 September 2019	
Elvira Velasco	Zamora	2	PPCyL	PP	People's	19 July 2019	24 September 2019	Replaces Isabel Blanco.
Noelia Vera	Cádiz	1	Podemos	UP	UP–ECP–GEC	14 May 2019	3 December 2019	
Aina Vidal	Barcelona	2	ICV	ECP	UP–ECP–GEC	20 May 2019	24 September 2019	
María Vilas	A Coruña	2	Cs	Cs	Citizens	29 August 2019	24 September 2019	Replaces Marta Rivera.
María Vilches	Albacete	2	PSCM	PSOE	Socialists	14 May 2019	24 September 2019	
Noemí Villagrasa	Zaragoza	3	PSA	PSOE	Socialists	14 May 2019	24 September 2019	
José Villegas	Almería	1	Cs	Cs	Citizens	14 May 2019	3 December 2019	
Daniel Viondi	Madrid	10	PSOE–M	PSOE	Socialists	9 May 2019	24 September 2019	
Agustín Zamarrón	Burgos	2	PSCyL	PSOE	Socialists	13 May 2019	24 September 2019	
José Zaragoza	Barcelona	4	PSC	PSOE	Socialists	9 May 2019	3 December 2019	
Ana María Zurita	Santa Cruz de Tenerife	1	PPC	PP	People's	16 May 2019	24 September 2019	

== See also ==
- 13th Cortes Generales
- 13th Senate of Spain
