= Blanca Fernández Morena =

Spanish politician (born 1972)

Blanca Fernández
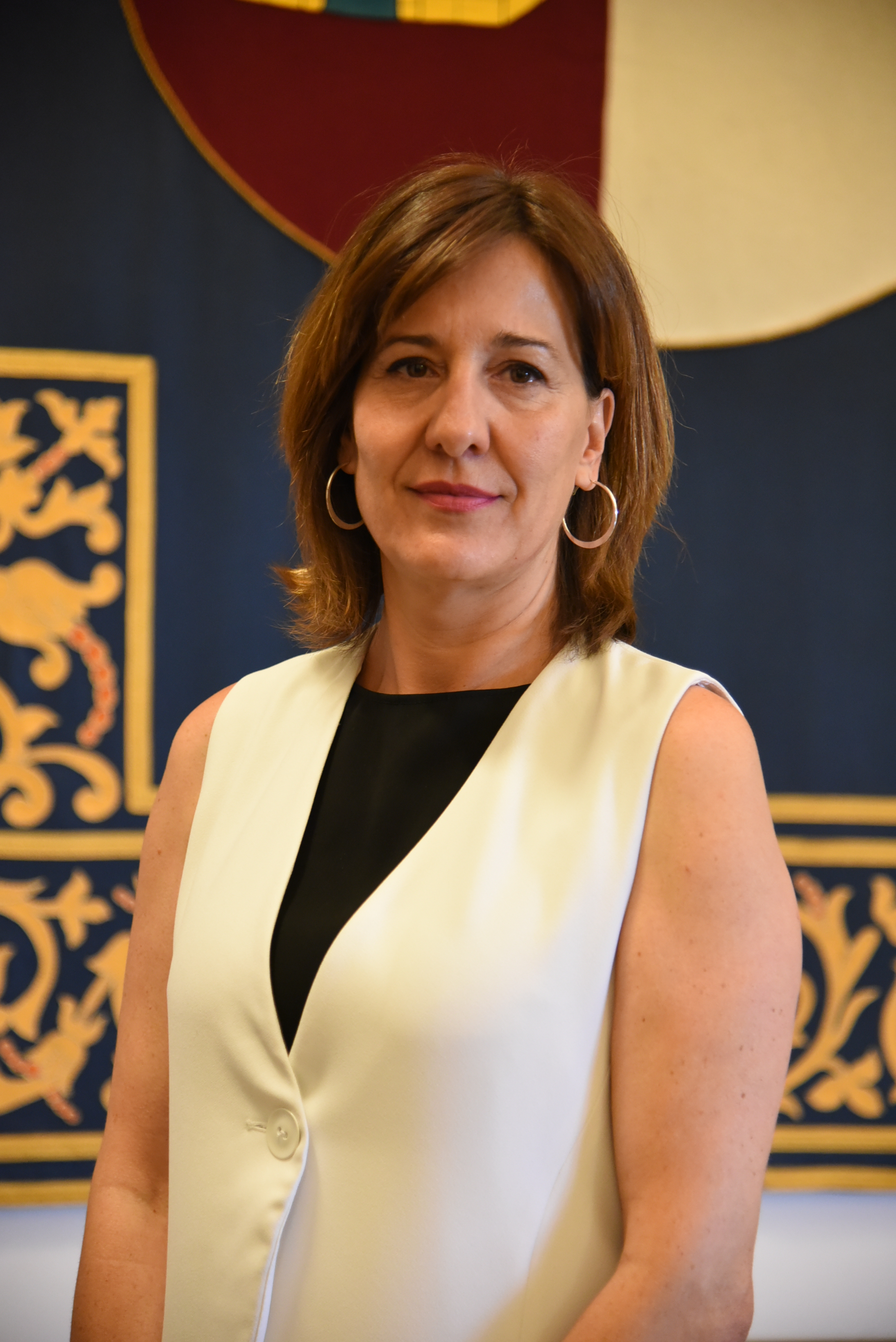

Minister of Equality of the Government of Castilla–La Mancha
- Incumbent
- Assumed office 8 July 2019

Spokesperson of the Government of Castilla–La Mancha
- Incumbent
- Assumed office 8 July 2019

Member of the Congress of Deputies
- In office 21 May 2019 – 8 July 2019
- Succeeded by: Cristina López Zamora
- Constituency: Ciudad Real

Member of the Cortes of Castilla–La Mancha
- In office 2011–2019
- Constituency: Ciudad Real

Personal details
- Born: 6 March 1972 (age 54)
- Party: Spanish Socialist Workers' Party
- Occupation: Politician

Blanca Pilar Fernández Morena (born 1972) is a Spanish politician member of the Spanish Socialist Workers' Party (PSOE), regional minister of Equality and a Spokesperson of the Government of Castilla–La Mancha since July 2019. She was a member of the 8th and 9th Cortes of Castilla–La Mancha as well as the 13th Congress of Deputies.

== Biography ==
=== Early life ===
Born on 6 March 1972, she studied Social Work in Cuenca. She served as Mayor of Porzuna between 2001 and 2008.

=== Regional legislator ===
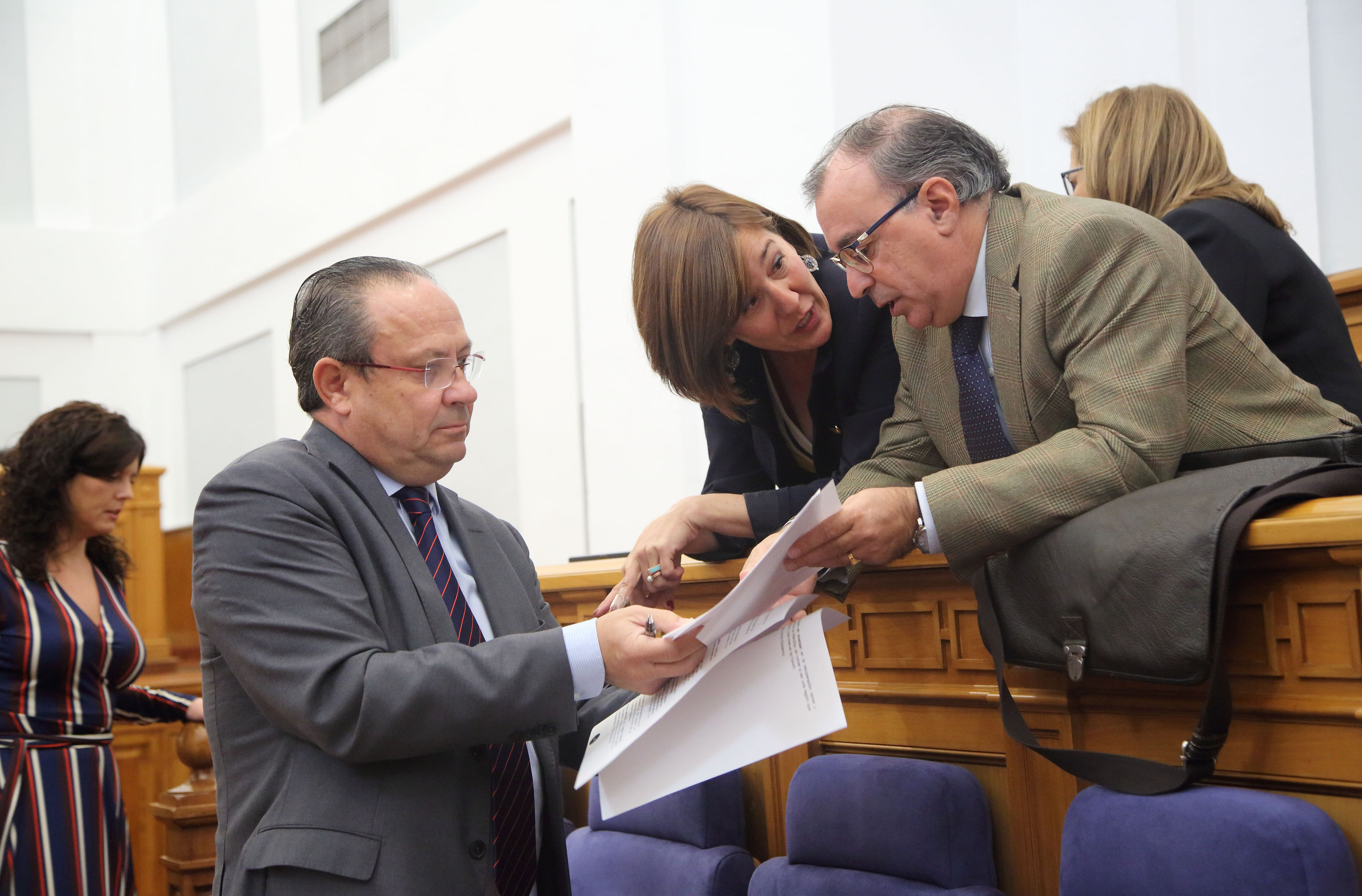
Fernández talking to Juan Alfonso Ruiz Molina and regional MP Emilio Sáez in 2017.

Fernández ran second in the Spanish Socialist Workers' Party (PSOE) list for Ciudad Real vis-à-vis the 2011 regional election in Castilla–La Mancha headed by Nemesio de Lara; she was elected member of the 8th term of the regional legislature, during which she served as Second Secretary in the parliament's Bureau. Secretary of Organization of the Ciudad Real's branch of the PSOE, she renovated her seat at the 2015 regional election, and, following the restructuring of the Socialist Parliamentary Group in the midst of the 9th regional legislative term, she became the spokesperson of her parliamentary group, replacing José Luis Martínez Guijarro.

=== Member of the Congress of Deputies ===
She contested the April 2019 general election, running as candidate to the Lower House for Ciudad Real. She was elected and became a member of the 13th Congress of Deputies.

=== Minister of the Government of Castilla–La Mancha ===
In July 2019, following the results of the May 2019 regional election in Castilla–La Mancha that delivered a qualified majority to the PSOE, Fernández was appointed by Emiliano García-Page (the regional premier who had renovated his mandate for a second term) as Minister for Equality and Spokesperson of the Government of Castilla–La Mancha, thus leaving her seat at the national legislature. She assumed office on 8 July along the rest of ministers of the cabinet.
