= Luc André Diouf =

Spanish politician (born 1965)

Luc André Diouf MP
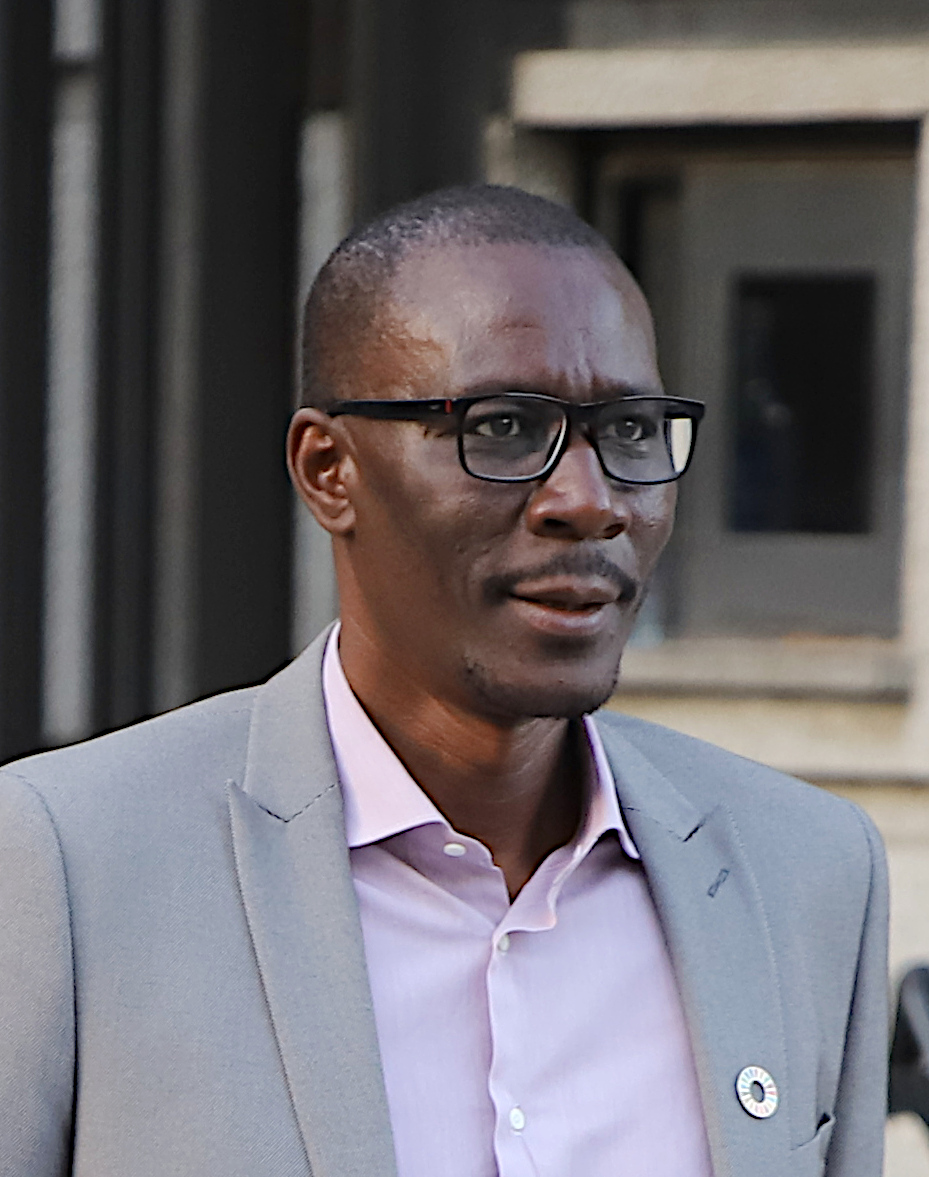
- Diouf in August 2019

Member of the Congress of Deputies
- Incumbent
- Assumed office 17 May 2019

Personal details
- Born: Luc André Diouf Dioh; 18 January 1965 (age 61) Joal-Fadiouth, Senegal
- Party: PSOE (2017–)

Luc André Diouf Dioh (born 18 January 1965) is a Senegalese-Spanish politician as well as a trade unionist and syndicalist. He is known in the Spanish media for being the first politician of African descent elected from the Spanish Socialist Workers' Party, as well as for being homeless in the past and having to sleep on a beach of the Canary Islands for over a month.

== Personal life ==
Diouf was born in Joal-Fadiouth, an island off the coast of Senegal. He is one of 10 siblings, with eight brothers and one sister, and grew up in an agricultural environment. Unlike most of Senegal, Diouf was raised Roman Catholic and most of his community was Christian.

Diouf attended the Cheikh Anta Diop University in the Senegalese capital of Dakar where he studied economics. After leaving the university, Diouf traveled to Lyon, then Utrecht, and then Cincinnati in search of work. he came to Gran Canaria on a temporary tourist visa. he got his residency in 1991 after his daughter was born on the island that year. He quickly ran out of money though and for 42 days Diouf was homeless and had to sleep on the beach. Eventually Diouf contracted pneumonia and had to be taken to a hospital in Las Palmas, where one of the nurses put him in contact with social workers. He would later get a job at a hotel in Jandía on the island of Fuerteventura and would also find work as a computer technician. Diof is a polyglot who speaks several languages: Wolof, Serer, French, and Spanish. He learned German while interacting with tourists at his hotel job.

In 2008, Diouf received a one-year-and-a-half prison sentence for injuring another man in a street fight in 2005. Diouf alleges that it began due to racist comments, though the sentence does not refer to racist behavior. The victim was an elderly person who was kicked in the head by Diouf, leaving him with lifelong injuries, as reflected in the sentence.

In 1996 Diouf joined the Workers' Commissions, or CCOO, where he worked as an advisory technician, as coordinator in the union's immigrant information centers, and as the secretary of immigration for the union's division in the Canary Islands. In 2001 Diouf acquired Spanish citizenship.

== Political career ==
Having participated in politics for a significant amount of time, in 2017 Diouf officially joined the Spanish Socialist Workers' Party. In June 2017 he was appointed to the Federal Executive Commission of the party. He was on the party's second ballot list in the April 2019 Spanish general election, where he was elected to the 13th Congress of Deputies. Together with Ignacio Garriga, Diouf is only the second individual of sub-Saharan African descent elected to congress after Rita Bosaho.
