= Lucía Muñoz =

Lucía Muñoz may refer to:

- Lucía Muñoz (singer), Spanish singer with the girl group Las Ketchup
- Lucía Muñoz (gymnast), Spanish rhythmic gymnast
- Lucía Muñoz Dalda, Spanish politician
