= Isaura Leal Fernández =

Spanish politician (born 1959)

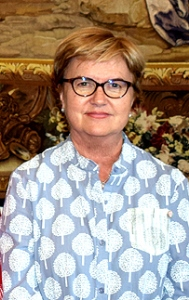

Second Secretary of the Congress of Deputies
- Incumbent
- Assumed office 17 August 2023
- President: Francina Armengol
- Preceded by: Sofía Hernanz Costa

Secretary General of the Socialist Parliamentary Group Socialist Party in the Congress of Deputies
- In office 12 September 2022 – 17 August 2023
- Preceded by: Rafaela Crespín
- Succeeded by: Montse Mínguez

President of PSOE-M
- Incumbent
- Assumed office 14 November 2021
- Preceded by: Manuel Robles Delgado

Commissioner of the Government of Spain against the Demographic Challenge
- In office 30 June 2018 – 23 March 2019
- President: Pedro Sánchez
- Preceded by: Edelmira Barreira

PSOE Executive Secretary for Civil Service
- In office 18 June 2017 – 17 October 2021
- President: Cristina Narbona
- Succeeded by: Llanos Castellanos

Member of the Cortes Generales for Madrid
- Incumbent
- Assumed office 4 February 2020

Member of the Assembly of Madrid
- In office 9 July 2015 – 2 July 2018

Personal details
- Born: 6 April 1959 (age 67) Valencia, Spain
- Party: Spanish Socialist Workers' Party
- Education: University of Valladolid, Charles III University of Madrid
- Occupation: Politician

Isaura Leal Fernández (Valencia, 6 April 1959) is a Spanish politician and a member of the Spanish Socialist Workers Party who currently serves as a deputy and Second Secretary of the Congress of Deputies. Between 2018 and 2019 she was the second and last Government Commissioner in front of the Demographic Challenge of the Government of Spain.

== Biography ==
Born in Valencia in 1959, Leal Fernández holds a degree in law from the University of Valladolid and a master's degree in Public Policy Analysis and Management from the Charles III University of Madrid. She is divorced and has a son.

She has been working in public administration since she was young, as a legal technician in the Ministry of Public Works and Territorial Planning of the Junta of Castile and León between 1983 and 1988. She then went on to work at the Spanish Federation of Municipalities and Provinces, where she worked until 2014. In that federation she held multiple positions, such as general secretary, director of the Legal Department, coordinator of Institutional Relations, director of Provincial Councils, Councils and Councils, Small Municipalities and director of Urban Planning, Environment and Housing.

She made the leap to active politics in the 2015 regional elections, being elected deputy to the Assembly of Madrid. In this, she served as deputy spokesperson in the Contracting Oversight Commission, spokesperson of the Control Commission of the Public Entity Radio Televisión de Madrid and member of the Commission of Inquiry on political corruption in the Community of Madrid.

Closely linked to the PSOE, since 2017 she has been the Executive Secretary of Public Function in the party's Federal Executive Committee.

In June 2018, the government of Pedro Sánchez appointed her as Government Commissioner for the Demographic Challenge, a position integrated into the Ministry of Territorial Policy and Public Function headed by Meritxell Batet. She left office in March 2019 when she ran as a candidate for Madrid in the general elections of April 2019, being elected deputy for the XIII Cortes Generales.

Already as a deputy, Leal is a member of the Regulation and Constitutional Commissions and president of the Territorial Policy and Public Function Commission. She is also a member of the Permanent Deputation of Congress.

In May 2021, following the resignation of José Manuel Franco as secretary general of the PSOE-M, Leal was appointed president of the Management Commission of the Madrid federation. This position is in addition to that of president of the Management Commission of the provincial federation of the PSOE of Huelva, a position she has held since November 2020.
