= María Teresa Pérez =

María Teresa Pérez may refer to:

- María Teresa Pérez (Venezuelan politician)
- María Teresa Pérez (Spanish politician)
