= Toni Roldán =

Spanish politician (born 1983)

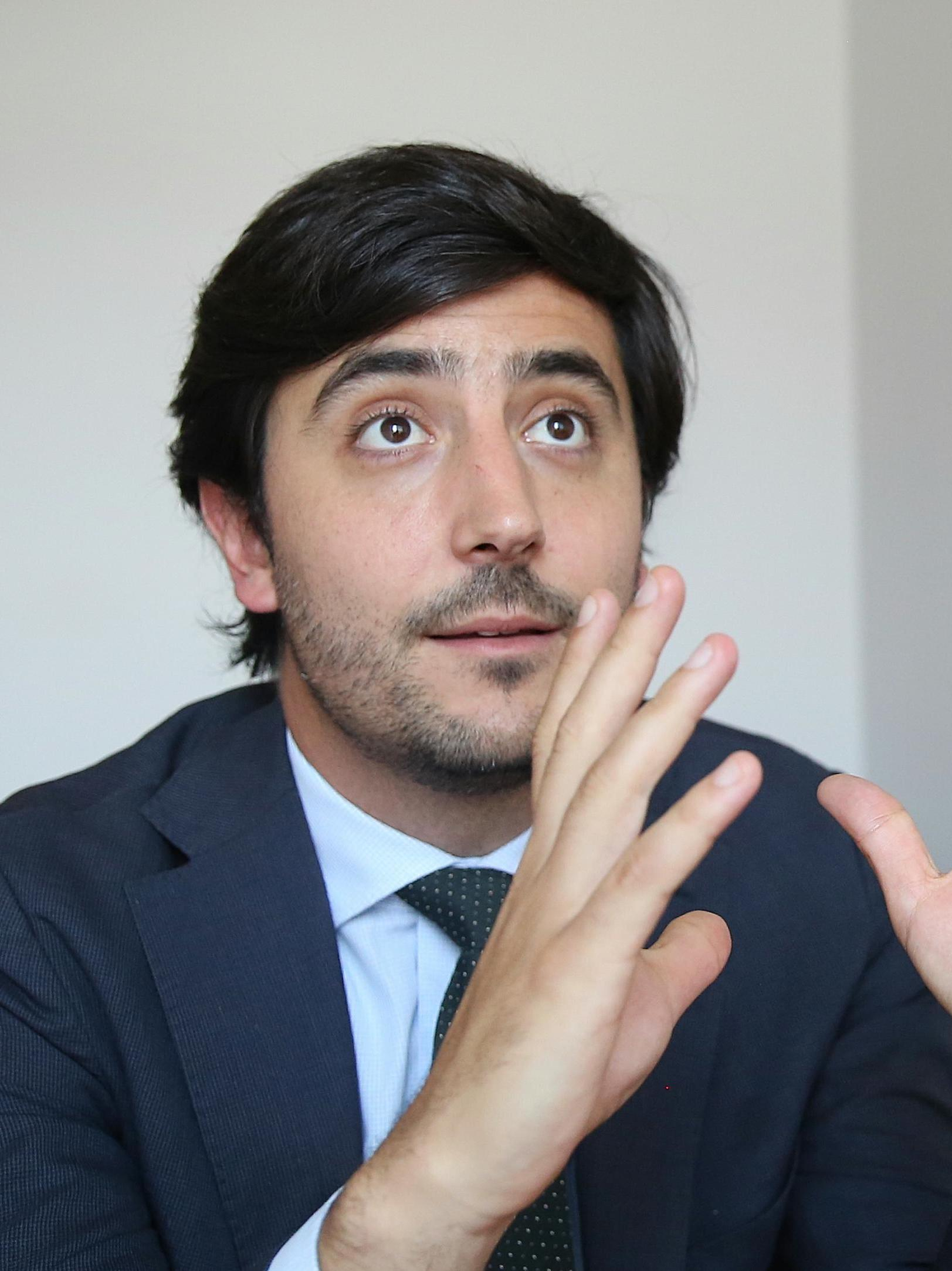

Member of the Congress of Deputies
- In office 13 January 2016 – 26 June 2019
- Constituency: Barcelona

Personal details
- Born: 14 May 1983 (age 42) Barcelona, Spain
- Occupation: Politician, economist, risk analyst, columnist

Antonio "Toni" Roldán Monés (born 1983) is a Spanish economist and politician who served as member of the 11th, 12th and 13th Congress of Deputies in the Citizens parliamentary group. He is now the director of the Centre for Political Economy (EsadeEcPol) at ESADE.

== Early life and education ==
Born on 14 May 1983 in Barcelona, Roldán graduated in Economic Sciences at the Autonomous University of Barcelona. He also obtained a MA in International Relations at the University of Sussex and in Economic Politics at the University of Columbia. He received his Master of Philosophy from the London School of Economics (LSE) in 2019 with a thesis titled The political economy of reform and corruption in Europe. Considered a pupil of Luis Garicano, Roldán has published pieces about economics at the HuffPost, eldiario.es and El País.

== Career ==
Roldán was employed as economic advisor of the Secretary-General of the PSOE Delegation at the European Parliament and at the Directorate-General for Economic and Financial Affairs of the European Commission. He also worked as political risk analyst for Eurasia Group and as researcher for the LSE.

Roldán joined Citizens-Party of the Citizenry (Cs) in September 2015. He was elected member of the Congress of Deputies at the 2015, 2016 and 2019 general elections. He served as Spokesperson in the area of Economy at the Lower House as well as the member of the party board charged with Political Platforms and Sectorial Areas. A representative of the social-liberal wing of Cs, on 24 June 2019 he renounced to his parliamentary seat and party responsibilities over concerns on the strategy of party leader Albert Rivera vis-à-vis post-electoral deals, after the party veto on Pedro Sánchez and rapprochement with the far-right Vox. He rhetorically asked in the announcement of his resignation "how are we going to move past the clash of red and blue – which is what we came to do – if we ourselves turn into blues??".

== Other activities ==
- European Council on Foreign Relations (ECFR), Member

== Works ==
Coauthor

- Recuperar el futuro: Doce propuestas que cambiarán España (2015), along Luis Garicano Gabilondo.
