= Belén Fernández Casero =

Spanish politician (born 1974)

Belén Fernández
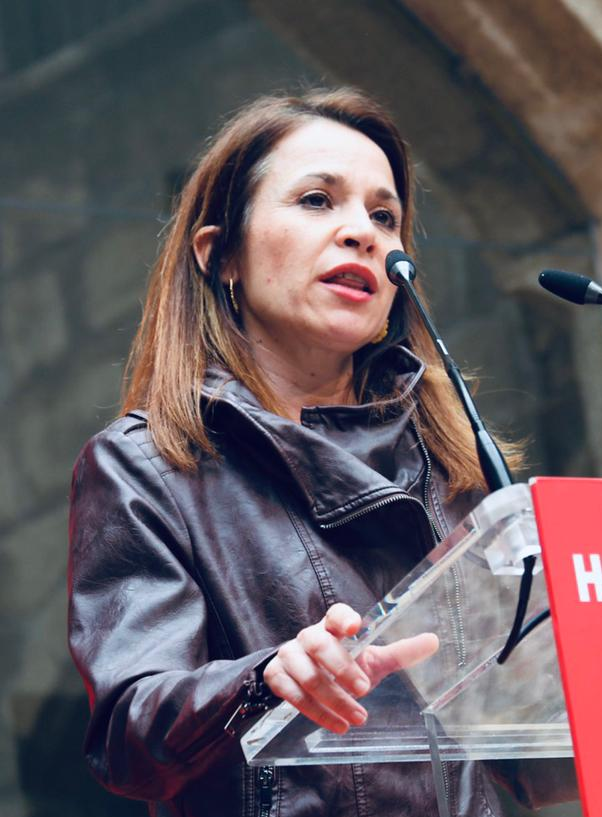

Member of the Congress of Deputies
- Incumbent
- Assumed office 21 May 2019
- Constituency: Cáceres

Cáceres municipal councillor
- In office 13 June 2015 – 15 June 2019

Personal details
- Born: 22 December 1974 (age 51) Cáceres, Spain
- Party: Spanish Socialist Workers' Party
- Occupation: Politician, civil servant, trade unionist

Ana Belén Fernández Casero (born 1974) is a Spanish politician of the Spanish Socialist Workers' Party (PSOE), who served as member of the 13th Congress of Deputies representing Cáceres.

== Biography ==
Born on 22 December 1974 in Cáceres, Casero earned a diplomature in Labor Relations at the University of Valencia. With a career as civil servant employed by the Regional Government of Extremadura (where she also held the role of union representative), she ran 2nd in the Spanish Socialist Workers' Party list for the 2015 Cáceres municipal election, and became city councillor, remaining active in the opposition to the People's Party local government for the 2015–2019 period.

She ran 1st in PSOE list for Cáceres for the Congress of Deputies in the April 2019 Spanish general election.
