= Rafael Mayoral =

Spanish lawyer and politician

Rafa Mayoral
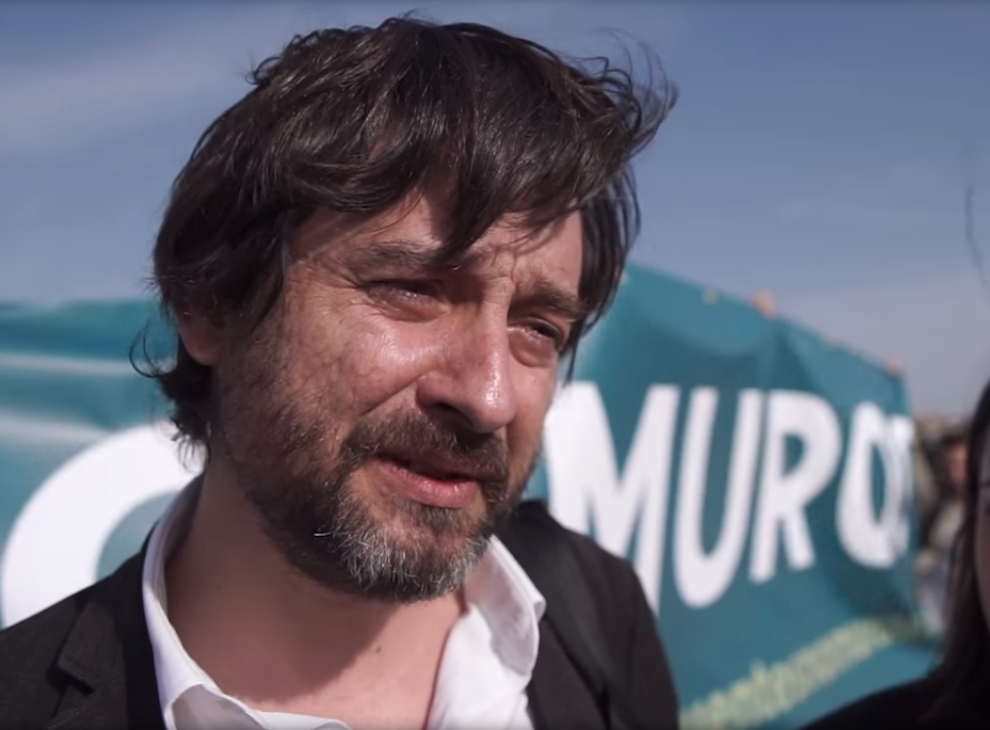
- In April 2017

Member of the Congress of Deputies
- Incumbent
- Assumed office 13 January 2016
- Constituency: Madrid

Personal details
- Born: 26 March 1974 (age 52) Madrid
- Party: Podemos (since 2014)
- Other political affiliations: Communist Youth Union of Spain
- Occupation: Politician, lawyer

Rafael "Rafa" Mayoral Perales (born 1974) is a Spanish politician, lawyer and activist. A member of Podemos, he has served as MP in the 11th, 12th and 13th terms of the Congress of Deputies representing Madrid.

== Biography ==
Born on 26 March 1974 in Madrid, he earned a Licentiate degree in Law at the Complutense University of Madrid (UCM). He led the Madrid regional organization of the Communist Youth in the 1990s, where he met Pablo Iglesias Turrión. In 2010 he headed a list to the 8th Congress of the Communist Party of Madrid (PCM), but Daniel Álvarez Morcillo, a Madrid municipal councillor adept to the orthodox line represented by Ángel Pérez, became the new Secretary-General of the PCM, with Mayoral retreating and ultimately calling for endorsement to Mauricio Valiente.

He has worked as lawyer for Ecuadorian neighbour associations against evictions, with Mayoral later becoming a member of the Madrid branch of the Plataforma de Afectados por la Hipoteca (PAH), a grassroots anti-eviction movement. He joined Podemos in the Spring of 2014, along Irene Montero, both active members in the PAH.

In November 2014, following the results of the Podemos' Citizen Assembly Sí Se Puede, Mayoral became a member of the state-wide "Citizen Council", the top body overseeing the party between the celebration of assemblies (congresses).

Mayoral ran 5th in the Podemos list in Madrid for the December 2015 Congressional election. Elected, he became a member of the 11th term of the Congress of Deputies, the Lower House of the Cortes Generales. He renovated his seat at the June 2016 and April 2019 general elections, in which he ran 6th and 5th in the Unidos Podemos and the Unidas Podemos lists in Madrid, respectively.
