= Rita Bosaho =

Spanish politician

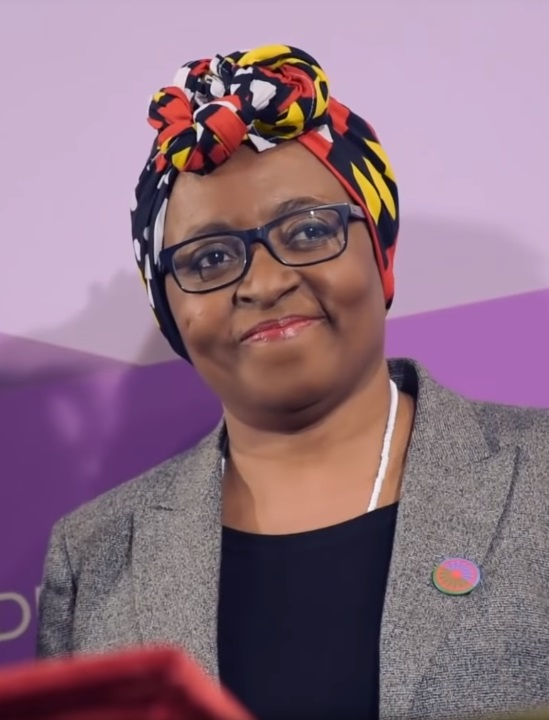
- Bosaho in 2020

Director-General for Equality of Treatment and Ethnic-racial Diversity in the Ministry of Equality
- In office 31 January 2020 – 8 December 2023
- Preceded by: Ignacio Sola Barleycorn
- Succeeded by: Beatriz Carrillo

Member of the Congress of Deputies
- In office 13 January 2016 – 27 February 2019
- Constituency: Alicante

Personal details
- Born: 21 May 1965 (age 61) Santa Isabel (Malabo), Spanish Guinea, Spain
- Party: Podemos
- Education: University of Alicante
- Occupation: Politician, activist, sanitary staff

Rita Gertrudis Bosaho Gori (born 21 May 1965) is an Equatorial Guinean-Spanish politician and activist member of Podemos, who served as Director-General for Equality of Treatment and Ethnic-racial Diversity in the Spanish Ministry of Equality from 2020 to 2023. She was a member of the 11th and 12th terms of the Congress of Deputies. In 2015, Bosaho became the first person of color, male or female, to be elected to a seat in the Spanish Parliament.

== Biography ==
Bosaho was born on 21 May 1965 in Santa Isabel (Malabo), in the province of Fernando Poo, Spanish Guinea. Bosaho is the niece of Enrique Gori Molubela, a bubi member of the Francoist Cortes, representing the then Spanish colony of Fernando Poo, as well as president of the Fernando Poo's provincial deputation.

Bosaho moved to Spain at the age of 4, living with military foster families in Cádiz and Cartagena before moving to Alicante.

She holds a degree in history from the University of Alicante. She worked as a nurse for 23 years in Alicante's general hospital. She earned a Master in Identities and Integration in Contemporary Europe and is preparing a PhD dissertation on the impact of European colonization in Africa. She has also undertaken activist work in the field of human rights, focusing, in particular, on reducing violence against women.

A member of Podemos, Bosaho stood as a candidate in the May 2015 Valencian regional elections, failing to win a seat. In November 2015, Bosaho was selected as the lead candidate on the party list to the Congress of Deputies in Alicante for the December 2015 general election, a decision which was disputed by opponents within the local branch. As she earned a seat, she became Spain's first-ever black member of the Lower House. She renovated her seat at the 2016 general election.

In January 2020, following the formation of the Sánchez II Government, Bosaho was appointed as Director-General for Equality of Treatment and Ethnic-racial Diversity of the Ministry of Equality led by Irene Montero. She assumed the post on 31 January. In 2023, PM Sánchez changed the whole Ministry of Equality team.
