= Edelmira Barreira =

Spanish politician

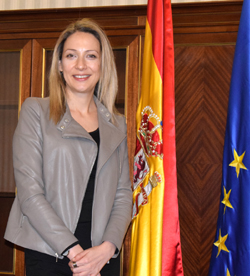

Government Commissioner for the Demographic Challenge
- In office 28 January 2017 – 23 June 2018
- Preceded by: Office established
- Succeeded by: Isaura Leal

Personal details
- Born: Edelmira Barreira Diz; 1978 (age 47–48) Verín, Galicia, Spain
- Citizenship: Spain
- Party: People's Party
- Education: University of Santiago de Compostela
- Occupation: Politician

Edelmira Barreira Diz is a Spanish politician born in 1978 in Verín. She has served as the 1st Government Commissioner for the Demographic Challenge from 2017 to 2018 and previously as Senator for the Province of Ourense from 2015 to 2017.

== Biography ==
Edelmira Barreira was born in 1978 in Verín. She obtained a license in Political Science and Administration at the University of Santiago de Compostela.

In late 2015, she was elected senator for the Province of Ourense and re-elected in the 2016 general election. Barreira left her position as senator in January 2017 when the Spanish government led by PM Mariano Rajoy appointed her as Government Commissioner for the Demographic Challenge (Spanish: Comisionada para el Reto Demográfico) to boost the nation's declining population. Barreira left the office in June 2018 and was replaced by Isaura Leal Fernández.

== See also ==
- Ana Belén Vázquez
- (in Galician) María Nava Castro Domínguez
