= Begoña Nasarre =

Spanish politician (born 1978)

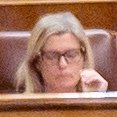
- Nasarre in 2023

Member of the Congress of Deputies
- Incumbent
- Assumed office 21 May 2019
- Constituency: Huesca

Member of the Senate
- In office 13 January 2016 – 4 March 2019
- Constituency: Huesca

Personal details
- Born: 19 July 1978 (age 47)
- Party: Spanish Socialist Workers' Party

Begoña Nasarre Oliva (born 19 July 1978) is a Spanish politician serving as a member of the Congress of Deputies since 2019. She has served as mayor of Alcolea de Cinca since 2019. From 2016 to 2019, she was a member of the Senate. From June to December 2015, she was a member of the Cortes of Aragon.
