= Susana Ros =

Spanish politician (born 1969)

Member of the Congress of Deputies
- Incumbent
- Assumed office 21 May 2019
- Constituency: Castellón
- In office 1 September 2009 – 26 October 2015
- Preceded by: Jordi Sevilla
- Constituency: Castellón

Personal details
- Born: 31 October 1969 (age 56)
- Party: Spanish Socialist Workers' Party

Susana Ros Martínez (born 31 October 1969) is a Spanish politician. She has been a member of the Congress of Deputies since 2019, having previously served from 2009 to 2015. From 2007 to 2011, she served as first deputy mayor of Benicàssim.
