= Aurora Nacarino-Brabo =

Spanish politician (born 1987)

Member of the Congress of Deputies
- Incumbent
- Assumed office 17 August 2023
- Constituency: Madrid
- In office 21 May 2019 – 24 September 2019
- Constituency: Burgos

Personal details
- Born: 16 May 1987 (age 38)
- Party: People's Party (since 2023)
- Other political affiliations: Citizens (formerly)

Aurora Nacarino-Brabo Jiménez (born 16 May 1987) is a Spanish politician. She has been a member of the Congress of Deputies since 2023, having previously served from May to September 2019. She has been a member of the People's Party since 2023, and was previously a member of Citizens.
