= Agustín Rosety =

Spanish politician (born 1947)

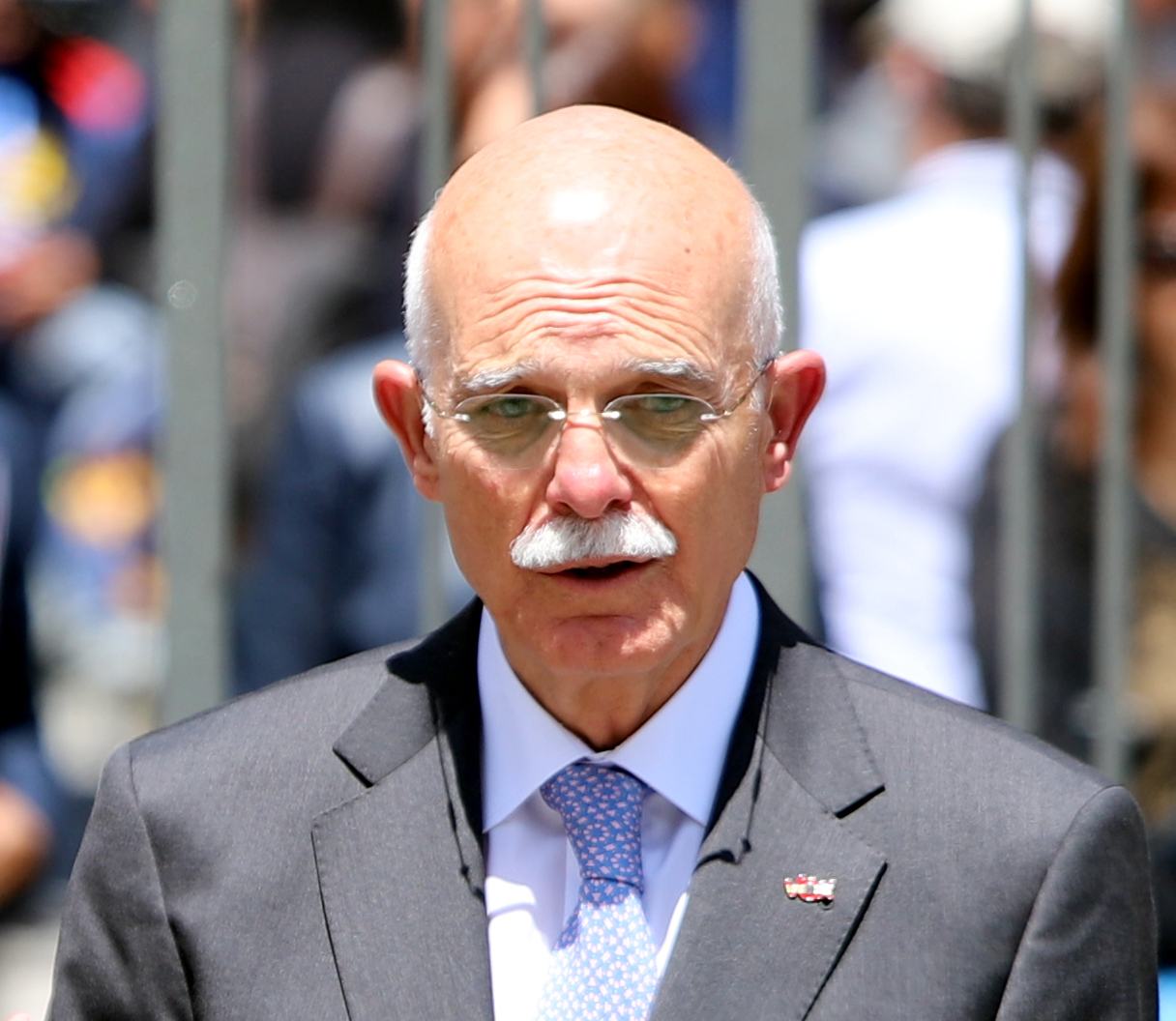

Member of the Congress of Deputies Parliament for Cádiz
- Incumbent
- Assumed office 17 May 2019

Agustín Rosety Fernández de Castro (born 26 March 1947) is a Spanish politician, representing Vox.

== Biography ==
A retired general of the Marine Corps, in 2018, Agustín Rosety signed a text exalting Francisco Franco signed by a number of former military commanders. The text justified the Spanish coup of July 1936 against the Second Spanish Republic.

At the April 2019 Spanish general election, he was elected to the Congress of Deputies for the 13th Cortes Generales in Cádiz. He was reelected at the November 2019 Spanish general election for the 14th Cortes Generales.

Rosety left Vox in February 2025 over discrepancies with the party's foreign policy positions, accusing leader Santiago Abascal of being a "Trump bootlicker".
