= Maria Dantas =

Brazilian-Spanish activist and politician

Excelentísima Señora Maria Dantas MP
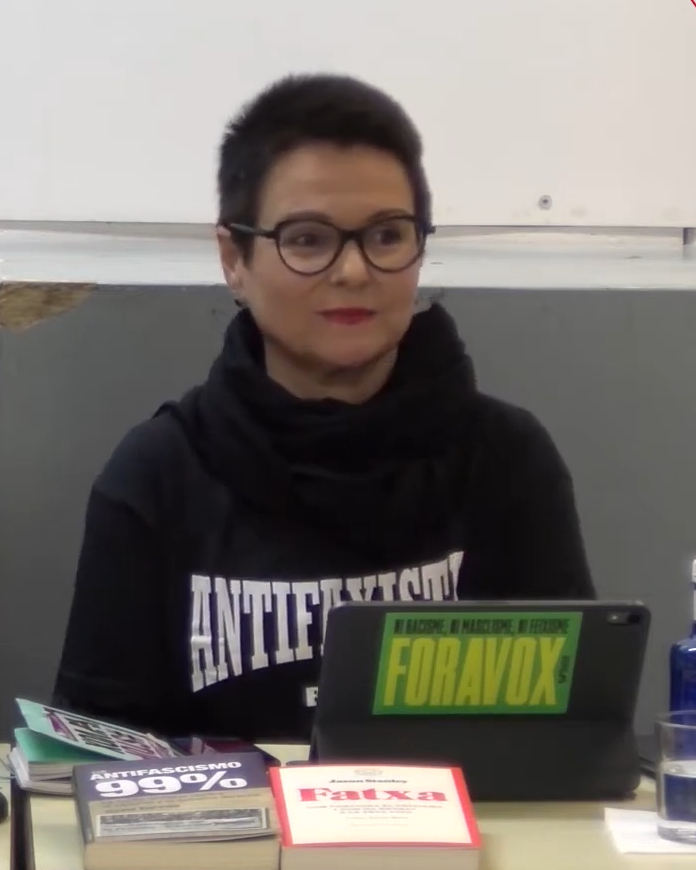

Member of the Congress of Deputies
- In office 16 May 2019 – 30 May 2023
- Constituency: Barcelona

Personal details
- Born: Maria das Graças Carvalho Dantas; 21 May 1969 (age 57) Aracaju, Sergipe, Brazil
- Party: Republican Left of Catalonia
- Other political affiliations: Republican Left of Catalonia–Sovereigntists
- Education: Federal University of Sergipe

Maria das Graças Carvalho Dantas (born 21 May 1969), known as Maria Dantas, is a Brazilian-Spanish activist and politician who had served as Member of the Congress of Deputies of Spain.

== Early life ==
Dantas was born on 21 May 1969 in Aracaju in north-eastern Brazil. She is the daughter of a merchant and a nurse. She has a degree in law from the Federal University of Sergipe. She was a student of Carlos Ayres Britto at the university.

Dantas worked as a deputy delegate for the civil police in Sergipe.

== Career ==
Dantas migrated to Spain in 1994 in order to study environmental law. She was an undocumented migrant and worked in various jobs over 15 years – as a maid, nanny, old age carer, dog walker, waitress and Portuguese teacher. She would clean toilets after attending doctorate classes. She later worked as an administrative assistant for a finance company. She is a naturalised Spanish citizen.

Soon after arriving in Spain Dantas became an activist against xenophobia, racism, fascism and homophobia and supporting immigration and human rights. She is a member of Unity Against Fascism and Racism (Unitat Contra el Feixisme i el Racisme) and is a member of the boards of Centre Internacional Escarré per a les Minories Ètniques i Nacionals (CIEMEN) and Confederació d’Associacions Veïnals de Catalunya (CONFAVC). Her activism has led to death threats from supporters of Brazil's far-right president Jair Bolsonaro.

Dantas contested the 2019 general election as a Republican Left of Catalonia–Sovereigntists electoral alliance candidate in the Province of Barcelona and was elected to the Congress of Deputies.

== Personal life ==
Dantas has a son, Thiago Lee, from a marriage when she was living in Brazil. She also has two daughters born in Barcelona, Victoria and Natalia, from a second relationship to a Brazilian.

== Electoral history ==
Electoral history of Maria Dantas
Election	Constituency	Party	Alliance	No.	Result
2019 general	Province of Barcelona	Republican Left of Catalonia	Republican Left of Catalonia–Sovereigntists	18	Elected
