= Laia Cañigueral =

Spanish politician

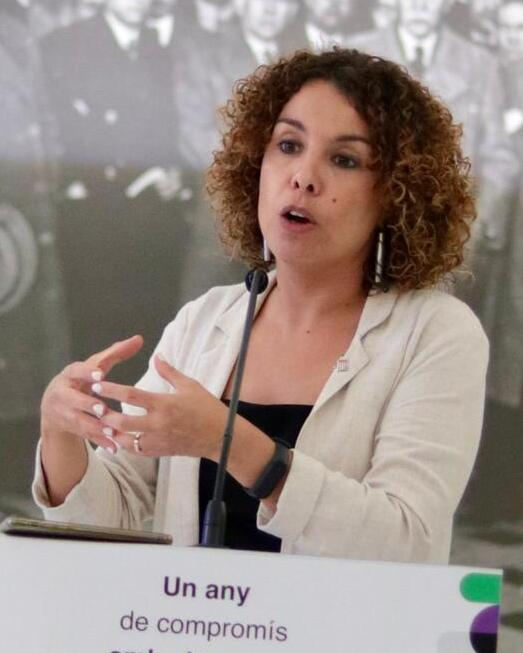
- Cañigueral in 2022

Member of the Parliament of Catalonia
- Incumbent
- Assumed office 12 May 2024
- Constituency: Girona

Member of the Congress of Deputies
- In office 16 May 2019 – 24 September 2019
- Constituency: Girona
- In office 2 November 2006 – 15 January 2008
- Constituency: Girona

Personal details
- Born: Laia Cañigueral i Olivé; 11 March 1981 (age 45) Cassà de la Selva, Catalonia, Spain
- Citizenship: Spain
- Party: ERC (2000–present)
- Education: Autonomous University of Barcelona
- Occupation: Sociologist • Politician

Laia Cañigueral i Olivé (born 11 March 1981) is a Spanish sociologist and politician from Catalonia who served as Member of the Congress of Deputies of Spain.

== Early life ==
Cañigueral was born on 11 March 1981 in Cassà de la Selva, Catalonia. She has a bachelor's degree in sociology and a post-graduate degree in citizen participation and sustainable development from the Autonomous University of Barcelona.

== Career ==
Cañigueral is a sociologist, specialising in citizen participation, sustainable development and local government. She has worked at the Catalan Agency for Development Cooperation, the Catalan Youth Agency (Agència Catalana de la Joventut) and the Catalan Women's Institute (Institut Català de la Dona).

Cañigueral joined the Young Republican Left of Catalonia (Joventuts d'Esquerra Republicana de Catalunya) in 1999. She was the JERC's national secretary for International Relations.

Cañigueral was one of the reserve candidates for the Republican Left of Catalonia-Acord Municipal (ERC-AM) electoral alliance candidate in Cassà de la Selva at the 2003 local elections. At the 2004 general election she was placed fourth on ERC's list of candidates in the Province of Girona but the party only managed to win two seats in the province and as a result she failed to get elected. She was however appointed to the Congress of Deputies in November 2006 following the resignation of Francesc Canet.

At the 2007 local elections Cañigueral was placed fifth on the ERC-AM's list of candidates in Cassà de la Selva but the alliance only managed to win four seats in the municipality and as a result she failed to get elected. At the 2015 local elections she was placed 13th on the ERC-MES-AM's list of candidates in Girona but the alliance only managed to win four seats in the municipality and as a result she failed to get elected.

At the 2008 general election Cañigueral was placed third on ERC's list of candidates in the province of Girona but the party only managed to win one seat in the province and as a result she failed to get re-elected. She contested the 2019 general election as a Republican Left of Catalonia–Sovereigntists electoral alliance candidate in the province of Girona and was re-elected to the Congress of Deputies.

== Electoral history ==
Electoral history of Laia Cañigueral
| Election | Constituency | Party | Alliance | No. | Result |
|---|---|---|---|---|---|
| 2004 general | Province of Girona | Republican Left of Catalonia | | 4 | Not elected |
| 2007 local | Cassà de la Selva | Republican Left of Catalonia | Republican Left of Catalonia-Acord Municipal | 5 | Not elected |
| 2008 general | Province of Girona | Republican Left of Catalonia | | 3 | Not elected |
| 2015 local | Girona | Republican Left of Catalonia | Republican Left of Catalonia-Left Movement-Acord Municipal | 13 | Not elected |
| 2019 general | Province of Girona | Republican Left of Catalonia | Republican Left of Catalonia–Sovereigntists | 3 | Elected |
