= Roberto García Morís =

Spanish politician (born 1982)

Member of the Congress of Deputies
- Incumbent
- Assumed office 17 May 2019
- Constituency: Asturias

Personal details
- Born: 5 February 1982 (age 44)
- Party: Asturian Socialist Federation

Roberto García Morís (born 5 February 1982) is a Spanish politician serving as a member of the Congress of Deputies since 2019. He has served as secretary of training of the Asturian Socialist Federation since 2017.
