= César Sánchez (politician) =

Spanish politician (born 1978)

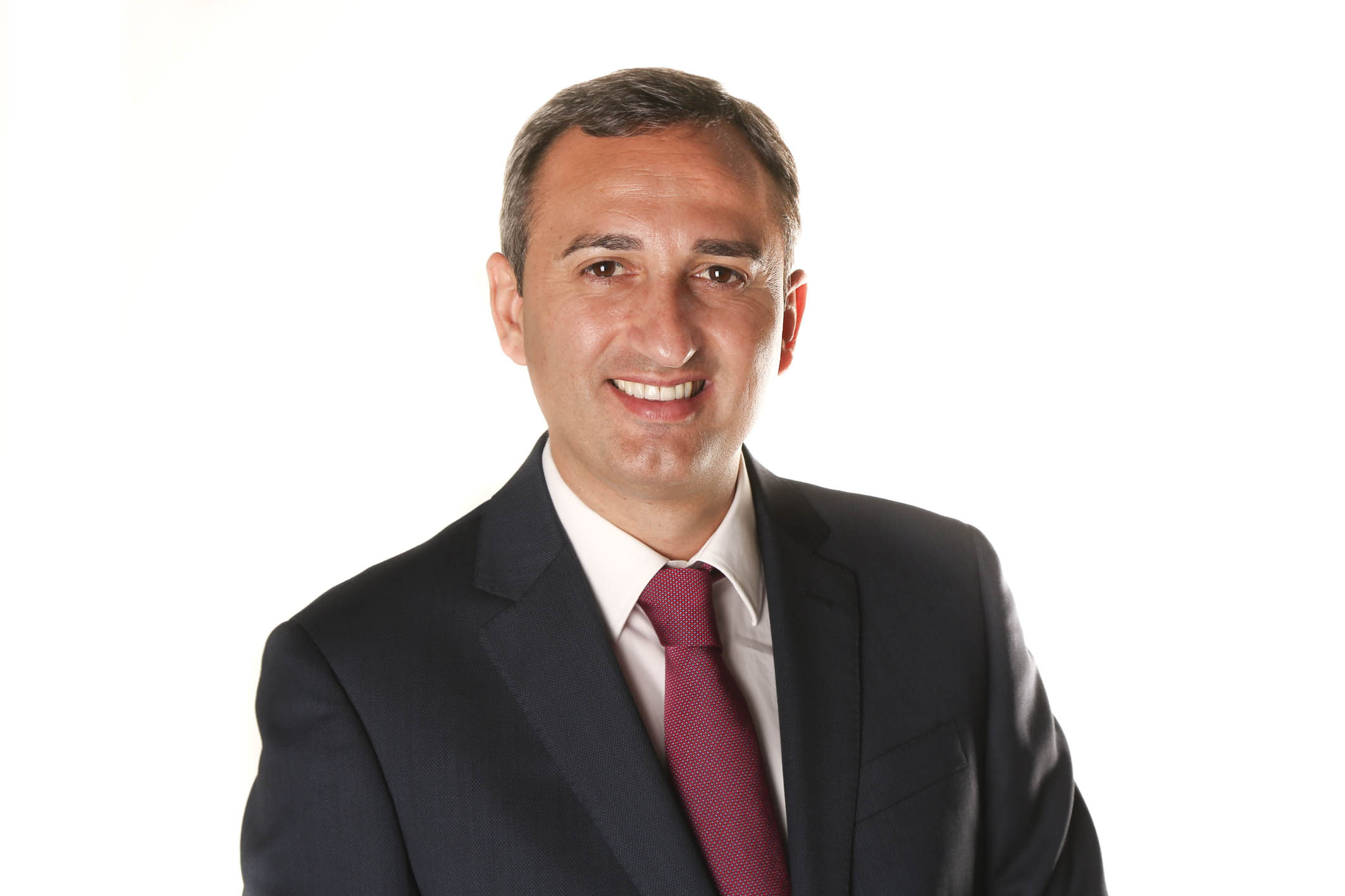
- Sánchez in 2015

Member of the Congress of Deputies
- Incumbent
- Assumed office 21 May 2019
- Constituency: Alicante

Personal details
- Born: 26 August 1978 (age 47)
- Party: People's Party

César Sánchez Pérez (born 26 August 1978) is a Spanish politician serving as a member of the Congress of Deputies since 2019. From 2011 to 2019, he served as mayor of Calpe. From 2015 to 2019, he served as president of the provincial deputation of Alicante. From 2007 to 2015, he was a member of the Corts Valencianes.
