= Elvira Velasco =

Spanish politician (born 1968)

Member of the Congress of Deputies
- Incumbent
- Assumed office 22 July 2019
- Preceded by: Isabel Blanco
- Constituency: Zamora
- In office 2 April 2004 – 15 January 2008
- Constituency: Zamora

Member of the Senate
- In office 9 March 2008 – 26 September 2011
- Constituency: Zamora
- In office 12 March 2000 – 20 January 2004
- Constituency: Zamora

Personal details
- Born: 5 March 1968 (age 58)
- Party: People's Party

Elvira Velasco (born 5 March 1968) is a Spanish politician. She has been a member of the Congress of Deputies since 2019, having previously served from 2004 to 2008. She was a member of the Senate from 2000 to 2004 and from 2008 to 2011.
