= Josefa Andrés Barea =

Spanish politician

Josefa Andrés Barea MP
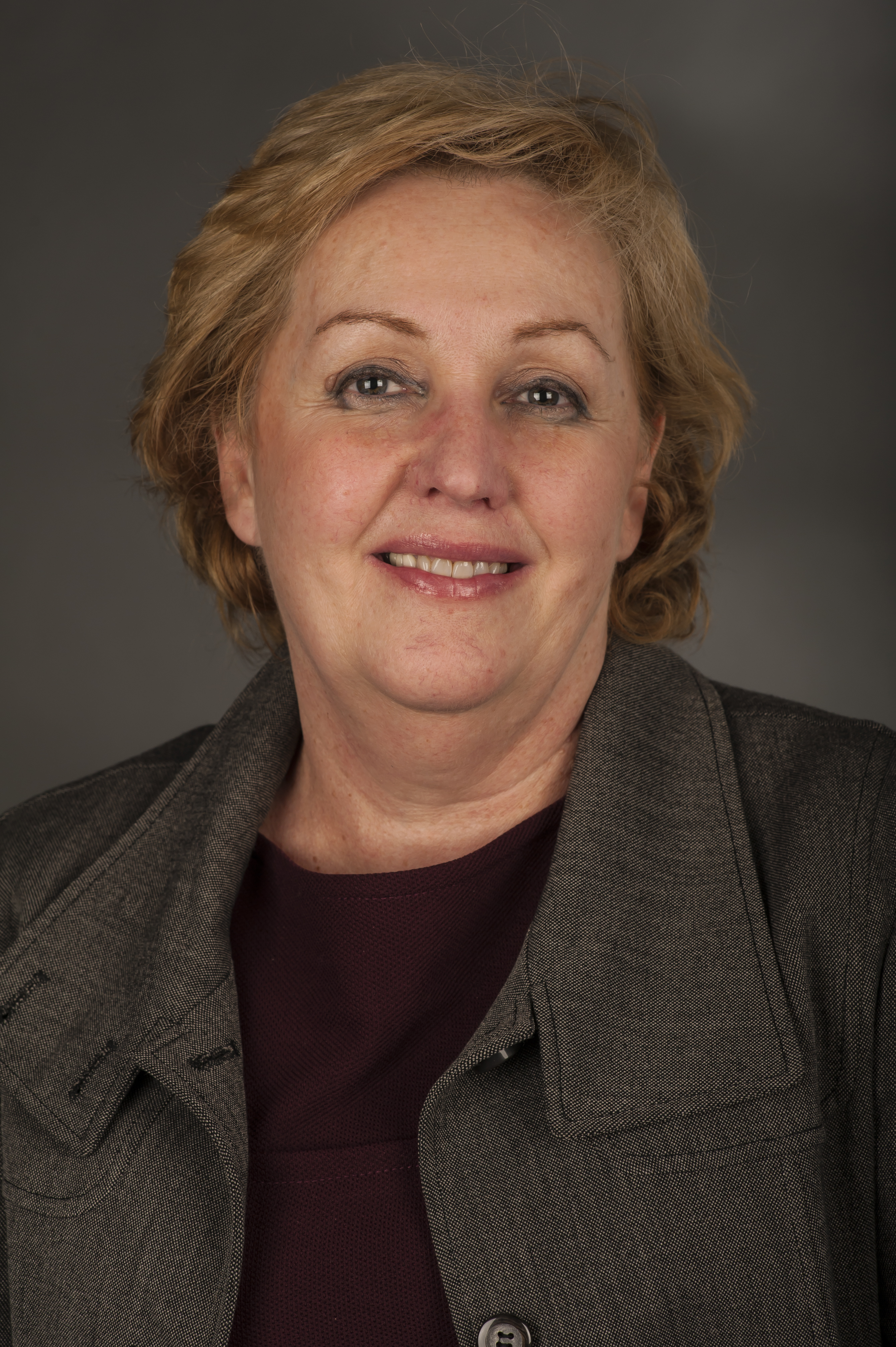

Member of the European Parliament
- In office 14 July 2009 – 30 June 2014
- Constituency: Spain

Personal details
- Born: 17 February 1958 (age 68) Valencia, Spain
- Party: Spanish Socialist Workers Party
- Occupation: Politician

Josefa Andrés Barea, is a Spanish politician. From 2009–2014 she served as a Member of the European Parliament, representing Spain for the Spanish Socialist Workers Party
