= Lourdes Méndez =

Spanish lawyer and politician

Lourdes Méndez MP
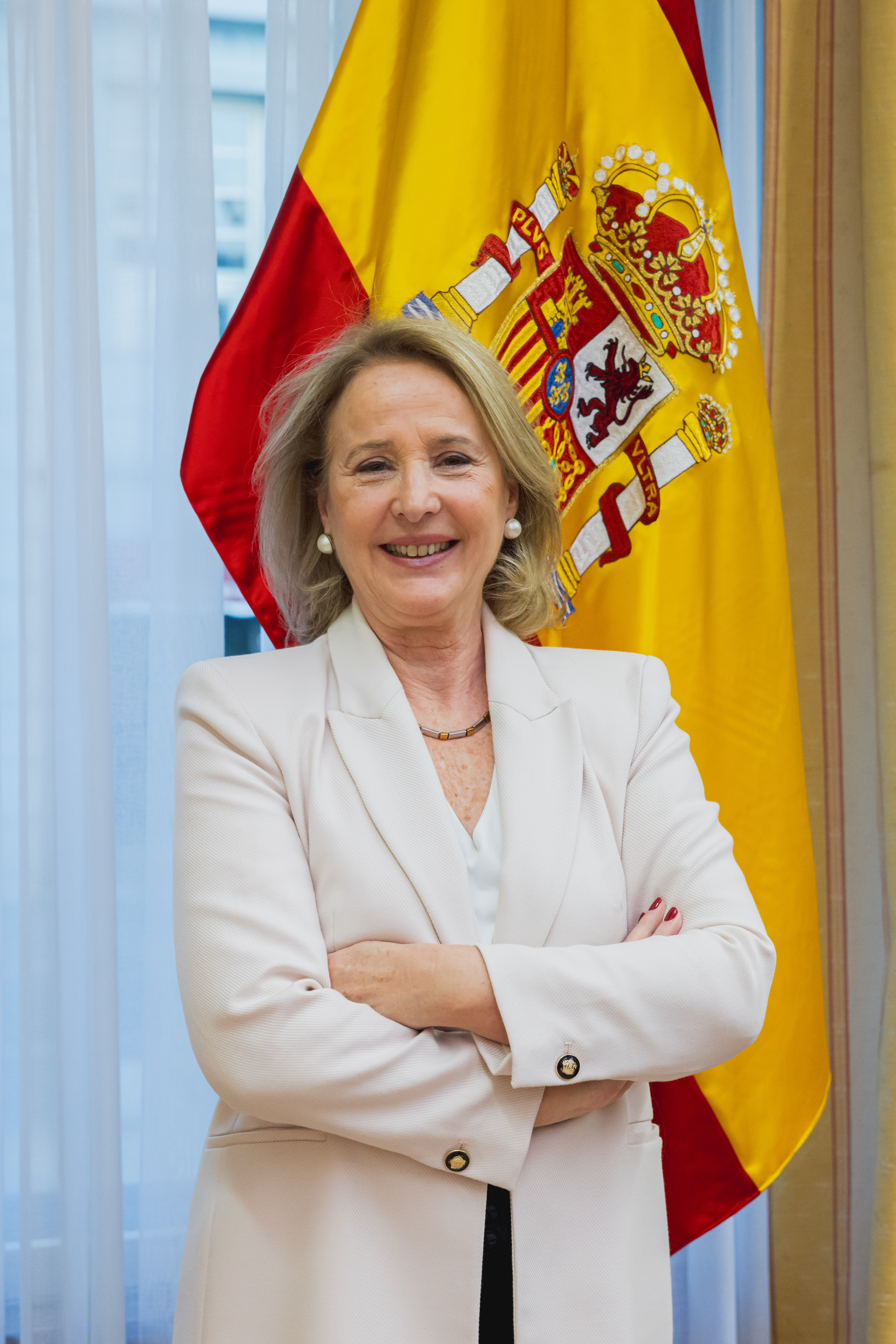
- Méndez in 2023

Member of the Congress of Deputies
- Incumbent
- Assumed office 21 May 2019
- Constituency: Murcia
- In office 2 April 2004 – 12 January 2016
- Constituency: Murcia

Personal details
- Born: Lourdes Méndez Monasterio; 11 February 1957 (age 69) Córdoba, Spain
- Party: Vox (since 2019)
- Other political affiliations: PP (1989–2016)
- Children: 6
- Education: Complutense University of Madrid
- Occupation: Lawyer • Politician

Lourdes Méndez Monasterio (born 11 February 1957) is a Spanish lawyer and politician. She has twice served as a representative in the Congress of Deputies, first between 2004 and 2016 for the People's Party and again for Vox since 2019.

== Biography ==
Méndez was born in Córdoba in 1957, she is the third in a family of thirteen siblings. Her paternal grandfather was José Monasterio Ituarte, who was actively involved in the Fascist coup of July 1936 and later served as chief of Spain's Army under Francisco Franco. She graduated with a law degree from the Complutense University of Madrid.

Méndez began her career as a member of the People's Party and served on the PP's national executive board before being elected to the Congress of Deputies in 2004. She was noted as being on the socially conservative and Catholic wing of the party, holding positions against abortion, same-sex marriage and euthanasia, which sometimes brought her into conflict with the PP's leadership. She subsequently left the PP after not being included on the party's election list for 2016, and claimed the PP was moving too much into the political centre by abandoning many of its principles. In 2018, she began to speak at public events for the Vox party but did not formally join until 2019. In 2019, she was returned to Congress of Deputies representing the Murcia constituency. She was re-elected in the 2023 Spanish general election

Méndez is the mother of six children, and a member of Opus Dei. She is the President of Asociación Familia y Dignidad Humana, an anti-abortion and anti-euthanasia association which promotes "family founded on marriage between a man and a woman".
