= Francisco Aranda =

Spanish politician (born 1977)

Member of the Congress of Deputies
- Incumbent
- Assumed office 21 May 2019
- Constituency: Barcelona

Personal details
- Born: 30 June 1977 (age 48)
- Party: Socialists' Party of Catalonia

Francisco Aranda Vargas (born 30 June 1977) is a Spanish politician serving as a member of the Congress of Deputies since 2019. He is the spokesperson of the Spanish Socialist Workers' Party in the justice committee.
