= José Carlos Durán =

Spanish politician (born 1987)

Member of the Congress of Deputies
- In office 7 May 2019 – 30 May 2023
- Constituency: Málaga

Personal details
- Born: 4 April 1987 (age 39)
- Party: Spanish Socialist Workers' Party

José Carlos Durán Peralta (born 4 April 1987) is a Spanish politician. From 2019 to 2023, he was a member of the Congress of Deputies. He previously served as secretary general of the Socialist Youth in Andalusia.
