= Laura Berja =

Spanish politician (born 1986)

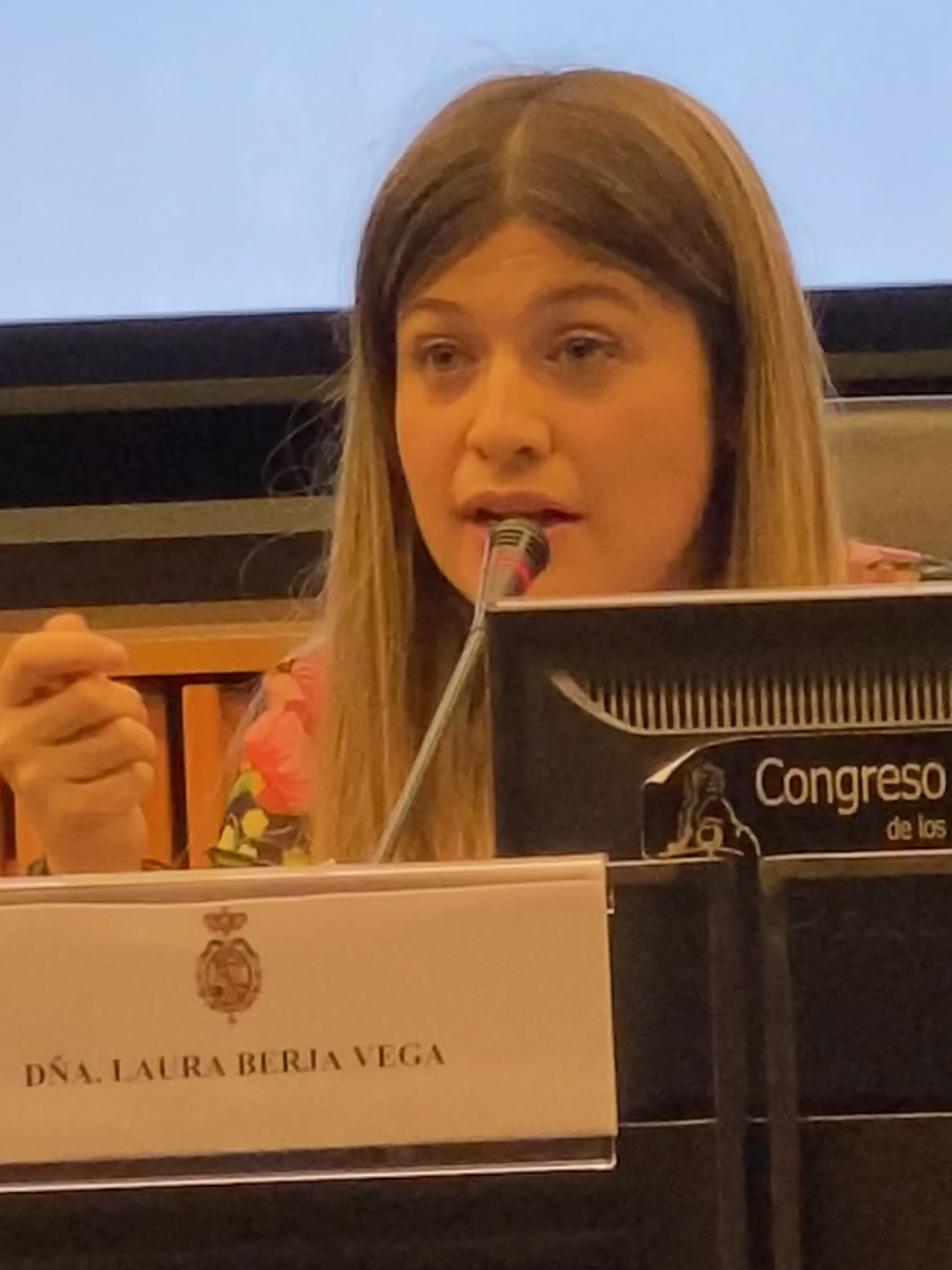
- Berja in 2022

Member of the Congress of Deputies
- In office 21 May 2019 – 16 August 2023
- Preceded by: Felipe López García
- Constituency: Jaén

Member of the Senate
- In office 20 June 2015 – 21 May 2019
- Constituency: Jaén

Personal details
- Born: 5 July 1986 (age 39)
- Party: Spanish Socialist Workers' Party

Laura Berja Vega (born 5 July 1986) is a Spanish politician. From 2019 to 2023, she was a member of the Congress of Deputies. From 2015 to 2019, she was a member of the Senate.
