= Ricardo Chamorro Delmo =

Spanish politician

Ricardo Chamorro Delmo MP
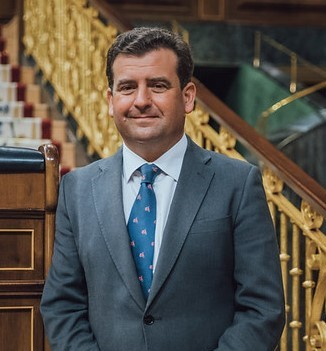

Member of the Congress of Deputies
- Incumbent
- Assumed office 21 May 2019
- Constituency: Ciudad Real

Personal details
- Born: 1 January 1977 (age 49)
- Party: Vox
- Education: University of Navarra

Ricardo Chamorro Delmo (born 1 January 1977) is a Spanish politician and a member of the Congress of Deputies for Vox.

Delmo is a lawyer by training and holds a law degree from the University of Navarra. In the Spanish general election of April 2019, he was elected to represent the Ciudad Real constituency in the Congress of Deputies and was re-elected in the November election of that year.
