= Gerard Gómez =

Gerard Gómez may refer to:

- Gerard Gómez (politician) (born 1989), Spanish journalist and politician
- Gerard Gómez (footballer) (born 2002), Spanish footballer

== See also ==
- Gerardo Gómez (disambiguation)
