= Alejandro Soler Mur =

Spanish politician (born 1972)

Member of the Congress of Deputies
- Incumbent
- Assumed office 21 May 2019
- Constituency: Alicante

Personal details
- Born: 30 September 1972 (age 53)
- Party: Spanish Socialist Workers' Party

Alejandro Soler Mur (born 30 September 1972) is a Spanish politician serving as a member of the Congress of Deputies since 2019. From 2007 to 2011, he served as mayor of Elche.
