= Arnau Ramírez =

Spanish politician (born 1989)

Member of the Congress of Deputies
- Incumbent
- Assumed office 21 May 2019
- Constituency: Barcelona

Personal details
- Born: 15 February 1989 (age 37)
- Party: Socialists' Party of Catalonia

Arnau Ramírez i Carner (born 15 February 1989) is a Spanish politician serving as a member of the Congress of Deputies since 2019. From 2018 to 2021, he served as first secretary of the youth wing of the Socialists' Party of Catalonia.
