= Porzuna =

- Municipality
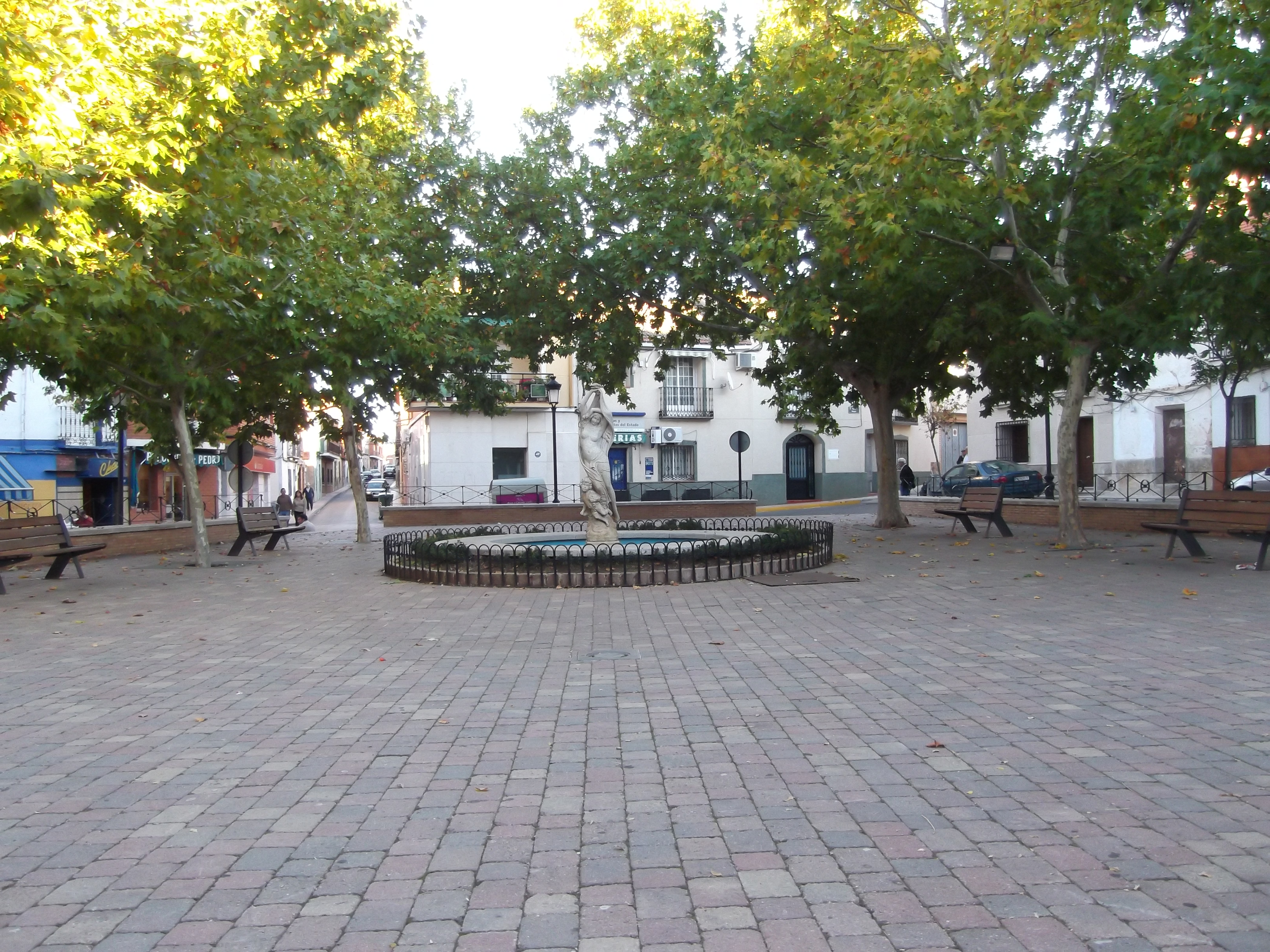
- The main square of Porzuna.

- Coat of arms

- Location of Porzuna. Porzuna (Castilla-La Mancha)
- Coordinates: 39°09′N 4°09′W
- Country: Spain
- Community: Castilla-La Mancha
- Province: Ciudad Real
- Comarca: Montes

Government
  - Mayor: Carlos Jesús Villajos Sanz (PP)

Area
  - Total: 211.90 km^{2} (81.82 sq mi)

Population (2023)
  - Total: 3,509
  - Density: 16.56/km^{2} (42.89/sq mi)
- Time zone: UTC+1 (CET)
  - Summer (DST): UTC+2 (CEST)
- Postal code: 03120
- Website: porzuna.es

Porzuna is a municipality in Ciudad Real, Castile-La Mancha, Spain located in the Montes region, it occupies an area of 211 km^{2}, with an average altitude of 646 meters. It has a population of 3,509 as of 2023.

== History ==
Numerous archaeological remains from the Lower and Middle Paleolithic have been found in the Porzuna district. They are prehistoric tools such as cleavers and double-axes, which illuminate a site of the first settlers for a long period of time.

Porzuna was the site of Romans and Visigoths, and it is from these civilizations that historical remains have been found such as those of a villa in La Porcuna Vieja, coins and carved stones of a Visigothic church (6th century) that are currently part of the archeology collection of the Ciudad Real Museum.

It is probable that, in the Muslim period, the lands of Porzuna belonged to the Castle of Malagón, and that the Bullaque river served as the natural eastern limit of the Kingdom of Badajoz until that kingdom disappeared.

It is in the 12th century when the term of Porzuna becomes property of the Order of Calatrava. In 1245 a document from the Archbishopric of Toledo and the Order of Calatrava on the payment of taxes appears for the first time under the title of Fuente Porcuna. Such a name may have made reference to the existence of a spring used by wild boars for drinking. After numerous confrontations, the terms of Porzuna and El Robledo were dispossessed of the Order of Calatrava in favor of Villa Real (today Ciudad Real) and it would not be until 1329 when, by sentence of Alfonso XII, Villa Real was forced to return Porzuna source and indemnify the Malagón Commander for the grievance. It was at this time that a demographic increase began to take place at the same time that Fuente Porzuna would be renamed Puebla de Padilla in reference to the master of the order.

In the middle of the 16th century, Porzuna was sold to the Marshal of Castilla Ares Pardo de Saavedra. From there, civil conflicts arose that were resolved with the Deed of Concord of 1552, through which the neighbors, the Council and the Lord, had the Rights established.

It continues like this until in 1769, by decree of Carlos III, it becomes an independent town of Malagón.

In 1901, the existence of the Commonwealth of Pastures in the Porzuna Lands was declared, and some time later, the Casa de Medinaceli decided to alienate its alleged rights to the Porzuna mountains and lands in 1906.

The same rights are divided, due to the different owners of the same, until Law 5/1980 tries to solve the problem of the historical rights of Porzuna establishing a reorganization of the property that would favor the municipality and neighbors, beginning, in turn, the Porzuna Land Concentration with the development of the same law.

== Monuments and heritage ==
=== Cerro de los Santos Volcano ===
It was declared a Natural Monument (DOCM 40, of March 30, 2001) made up of a single monogenic volcano, its area is 84 hectares. Its degree of erosion is medium. Its uniqueness lies in the relief in the form of a large dome on the plain that surrounds it.

== Districts ==
- El Torno
- El Trincheto
- Las Casas del Río
- Las Tiñosillas
- El Citolero
- Las Rabinadas
- Las Betetas
- Las Rabinadillas
- El Bonal
- El Cepero
- Los puentes de Piedralá
