= Beatriz Carrillo =

Spanish politician and activist

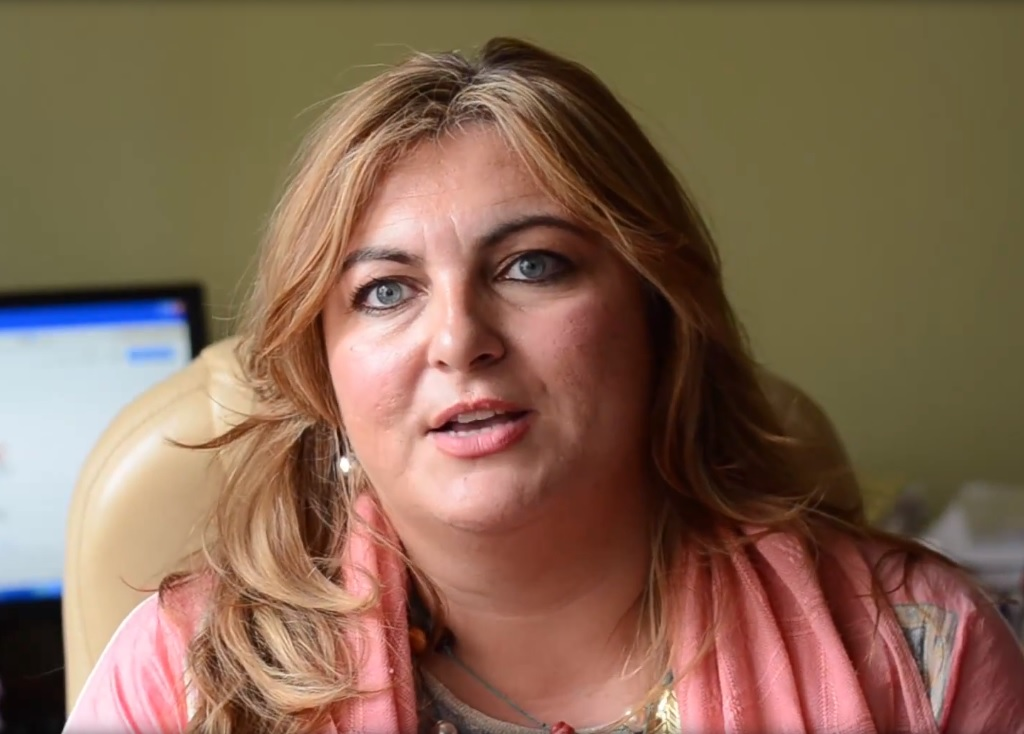

Member of the Congress of Deputies
- Incumbent
- Assumed office 21 May 2019
- Constituency: Seville

Personal details
- Born: 2 June 1975 (age 51) Palma del Río, Spain
- Occupation: Social activist, social worker, politician

Beatriz Micaela Carrillo de los Reyes (born 2 June 1975) is a Spanish politician and social activist. She is as member of the 13th Congress of Deputies integrated within the Socialist Parliamentary Group, representing Seville.

== Biography ==
Born on 2 June 1975 in Palma del Río, in the province of Córdoba, she is of Romani ethnicity. A self-described Socialist "since (she was in) the bassinet", her father had been a clandestine Spanish Socialist Workers' Party (PSOE) member during the Francoist Spain era, who fought against truancy among the Gipsy kids. She undertook studies in Business Administration, earned a diplomature in Social Work and a Licentiate degree in Anthropology; she paid her studies with work in the street vending and in the orange industry in her native town.

A social activist known by her work as President of Fakali, the Federation of Gypsy Women Associations, she ran 3rd in PSOE list for Seville for the Congress of Deputies vis-à-vis the 2019 general election. She was elected member of the 13th term of the Lower House.
