= Roser Maestro =

Spanish politician (born 1988)

Roser Maestro Moliner

Member of the Congress of Deputies
- In office 8 May 2019 – 24 September 2019
- Constituency: Valencia

Personal details
- Born: 18 November 1988 (age 37) Puerto de Sagunto, Valencian Community, Spain
- Party: Unidas Podemos; United Left of the Valencian Country; Communist Party of the Valencian Country
- Occupation: politician

Roser Maestro Moliner (born in Puerto de Sagunto, 18 November 1988) is a Spanish communist politician and member of the Congress of Deputies since the 13th legislature. She is a member of the United Left of the Valencian Country and the Communist Party of the Valencian Country.

== Biography ==
She was previously a councillor in Sagunto, Valencian Community. She was elected for the office in the 2015 Spanish local elections for the United Left of the Valencian Country.

In the 2015 Spanish general election she ran for the Congress of Deputies for the Valencia constituency.

In March 2019, she won the primary elections of the United Left of the Valencian Country for the April 2019 Spanish general election. She was the head of the candidature promoted by the Communist Party of the Valencian Country, competing with the candidature of Esther López Barceló, which was closer to the United Left direction. The primaries list headed by Maestro was initially formed by women only, but it had to be modified to comply with the parity law.
