= José Ramírez del Río =

Spanish politician

José Ramírez del Río MP
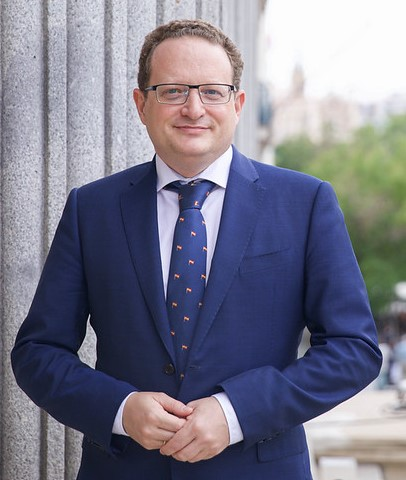

Member of the Congress of Deputies
- Constituency: Córdoba

Personal details
- Born: José Ramírez del Río; February 10, 1973 Madrid, Spain
- Party: Vox
- Education: University of Seville
- Occupation: Politician; Author; Linguist; Teacher assistant

José Ramírez del Río (born February 10, 1973) is a Spanish assistant professor, scholar, author and politician who has been a member of the Congress of Deputies for the Vox representing the Córdoba constituency.

== Biography ==
del Río was born in Madrid and attended the University of Seville after finishing high school. He graduated with a degree in Semitic, Arabic and Islamic studies and has published a number of works in these fields. He then completed a PhD in translation. He worked as a lecturer at the University of Seville before becoming an assistant professor of Translation studies at the University of Córdoba in 2007.

He is married with two children.

== Political career ==
del Río has served as the secretary for the Vox party in Cordoba. Ahead of the April 2019 Spanish general election, he stood as a candidate for the party in the Cordoba constituency and was elected to the Congress of Deputies. He was again re-elected in November 2019.

In politics, del Río has focused on matters related to education. In the Congress, he sits on the committees for Culture and Education. He also supports keeping the borders with Ceuta and Melilla between Morocco closed and has accused the Moroccan government of violating Spanish territorial waters. In line with Vox's policy stance, he also favours ending public subsidies to NGOs and movements which seek to promote regional separatism in Spain and signed a letter with other Vox representatives calling on Spaniards to "defend the homeland against separatism." In 2019, del Río went against Vox's policy which called for the removal of a bust of Abd al-Rahman III in a public square in the town of Cadrete by arguing that "judging past events from the present is absurd." Local politicians from the People's Party and Citizens had also supported the removal of the bust.
