= Cristina López Zamora =

Spanish politician (born 1989)

Member of the Congress of Deputies
- Incumbent
- Assumed office 12 December 2023
- Preceded by: Isabel Rodríguez García
- Constituency: Ciudad Real
- In office 22 July 2019 – 30 May 2023
- Preceded by: Blanca Fernández Morena
- Constituency: Ciudad Real

Personal details
- Born: 25 March 1989 (age 37)
- Party: Spanish Socialist Workers' Party

Cristina López Zamora (born 25 March 1989) is a Spanish politician. She has been a member of the Congress of Deputies since 2023, having previously served from 2019 to 2023. She is the spokesperson of the Spanish Socialist Workers' Party in the province of Ciudad Real.
