= Tomás Cabezón =

Spanish politician (born 1981)

Member of the Congress of Deputies
- Incumbent
- Assumed office 21 May 2019
- Constituency: Soria

Member of the Senate
- In office 13 January 2016 – 29 May 2023
- Constituency: Soria

Personal details
- Born: 7 December 1981 (age 44)
- Party: People's Party

Tomás Cabezón Casas (born 7 December 1981) is a Spanish politician serving as a member of the Congress of Deputies since 2019. From 2016 to 2019, he was a member of the Senate.
