= José Luis Aceves =

Spanish politician and environmental agent

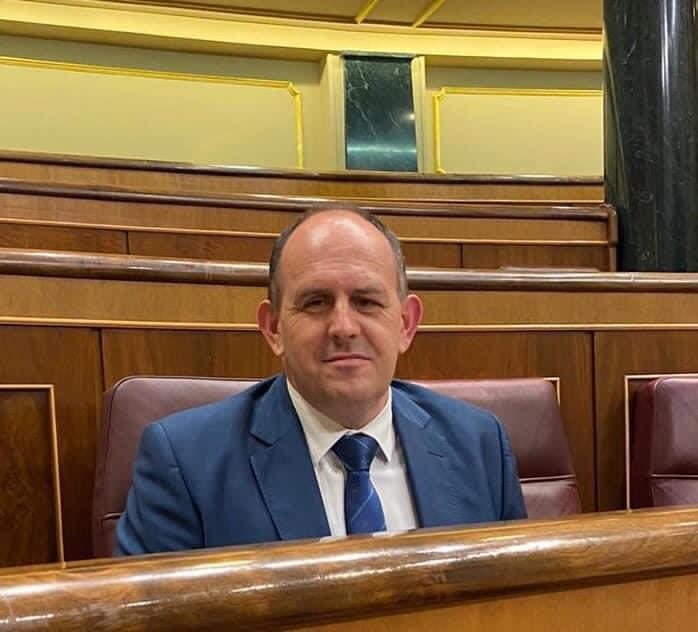

Member of the Spanish Parliament
- Incumbent
- Assumed office 21 May 2019

Procurator of the Cortes of Castile and León
- In office 24 May 2015 – 26 May 2019

Member of the Segovia Provincial Deputation
- In office 25 May 2003 – 24 May 2015

Personal details
- Born: José Luis Aceves Galindo; 21 May 1970 (age 56) Segovia, Spain
- Party: Spanish Socialist Workers' Party
- Education: National University of Distance Education
- Occupation: Politician and environmental agent

José Luis Aceves Galindo (born 21 May 1970, Segovia, Spain) is a Spanish politician and environmental agent for the Spanish Socialist Workers' Party, currently a member of the Spanish Parliament since the 13th legislature. His parliamentary activity is very focused on the problems of Empty Spain, the environment and public administration.

== Political career ==
He started in politics from the PSOE as Councilman of the City Council of Coca from the municipal elections of 2003 until 2015, simultaneously occupying the position of provincial deputy where he was socialist spokesman since 2011. From the regional elections of 2015 until 2019 he was a member of the Parliament of Castilla y León for Segovia, where he was the Spokesman for the Environment.

On 1 October 2017 he was elected in primaries secretary general of the PSOE of Segovia, with 58% of the support, replacing Juan Luis Gordo.

He was elected deputy in the general elections of April 2019, November 2019 and July 2023. In view of the investiture session of Pedro Sánchez in January 2020, he denounced in several media pressures to change his vote, given that the change of vote of a single deputy would make the investiture fail, which finally did not happen.
