= Montse Mínguez =

Spanish politician (born 1976)

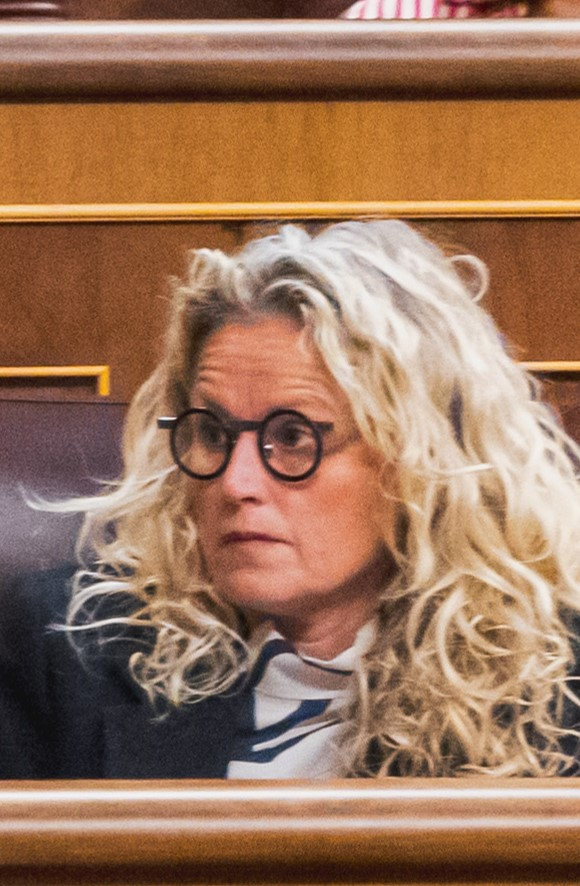
- Mínguez in 2024

Member of the Congress of Deputies
- Incumbent
- Assumed office 21 May 2019
- Constituency: Lleida

Personal details
- Born: 2 July 1976 (age 50) Lerida, Spanish State
- Party: Socialists' Party of Catalonia

Montserrat Mínguez García (born 2 July 1976) is a Spanish politician serving as a member of the Congress of Deputies since 2019. She has served as spokesperson of the Spanish Socialist Workers' Party since 2025 until her resignation in 2026 after it became public that her husband had real estate companies, something that Mínguez herself had criticized in the midst of a housing crisis.
