= María Teresa Pérez (Spanish politician) =

Spanish politician (born 1993)

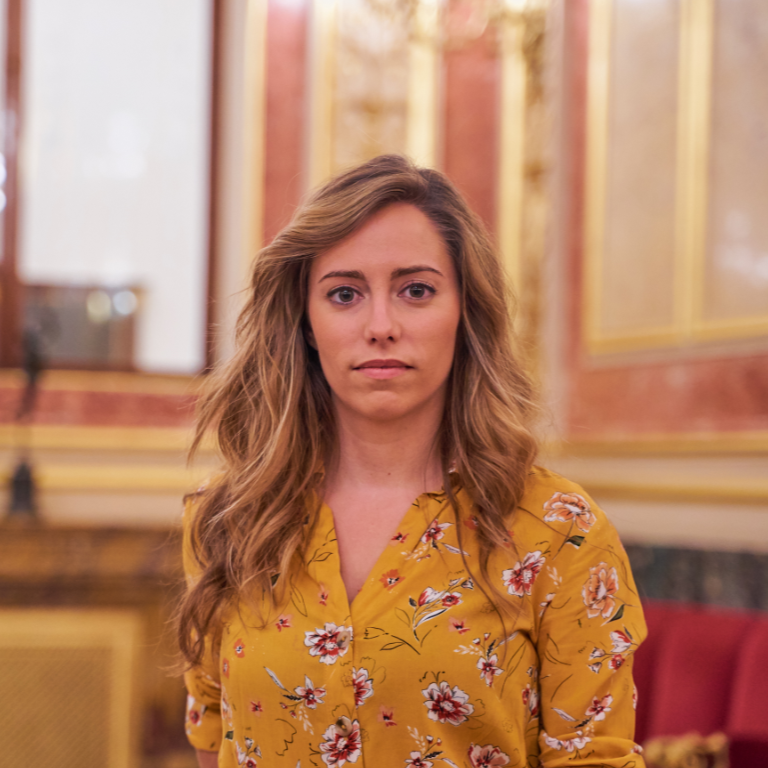
- Pérez in 2019

Member of the Congress of Deputies
- In office 21 May 2019 – 24 September 2019
- Constituency: Alicante

Personal details
- Born: 29 July 1993 (age 32)
- Party: Podemos

María Teresa Pérez Díaz (born 29 July 1993) is a Spanish politician serving as coordinator of Podemos in the Valencian Community since 2024. From May to September 2019, she was a member of the Congress of Deputies.
