= Sofía Hernanz =

Spanish politician (born 1970)

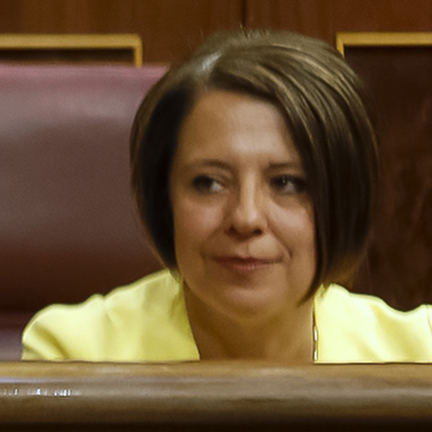
- Hernanz in 2018

Member of the Congress of Deputies
- In office 13 December 2011 – 17 August 2023
- Constituency: Balearic Islands

Personal details
- Born: 21 June 1970 (age 55)
- Party: Spanish Socialist Workers' Party

Sofía Hernanz Costa (born 21 June 1970) is a Spanish politician. From 2011 to 2023, she was a member of the Congress of Deputies. From 1999 to 2003, she was a member of the Parliament of the Balearic Islands.
