= Lucía Muñoz Dalda =

Spanish politician (born 1993)

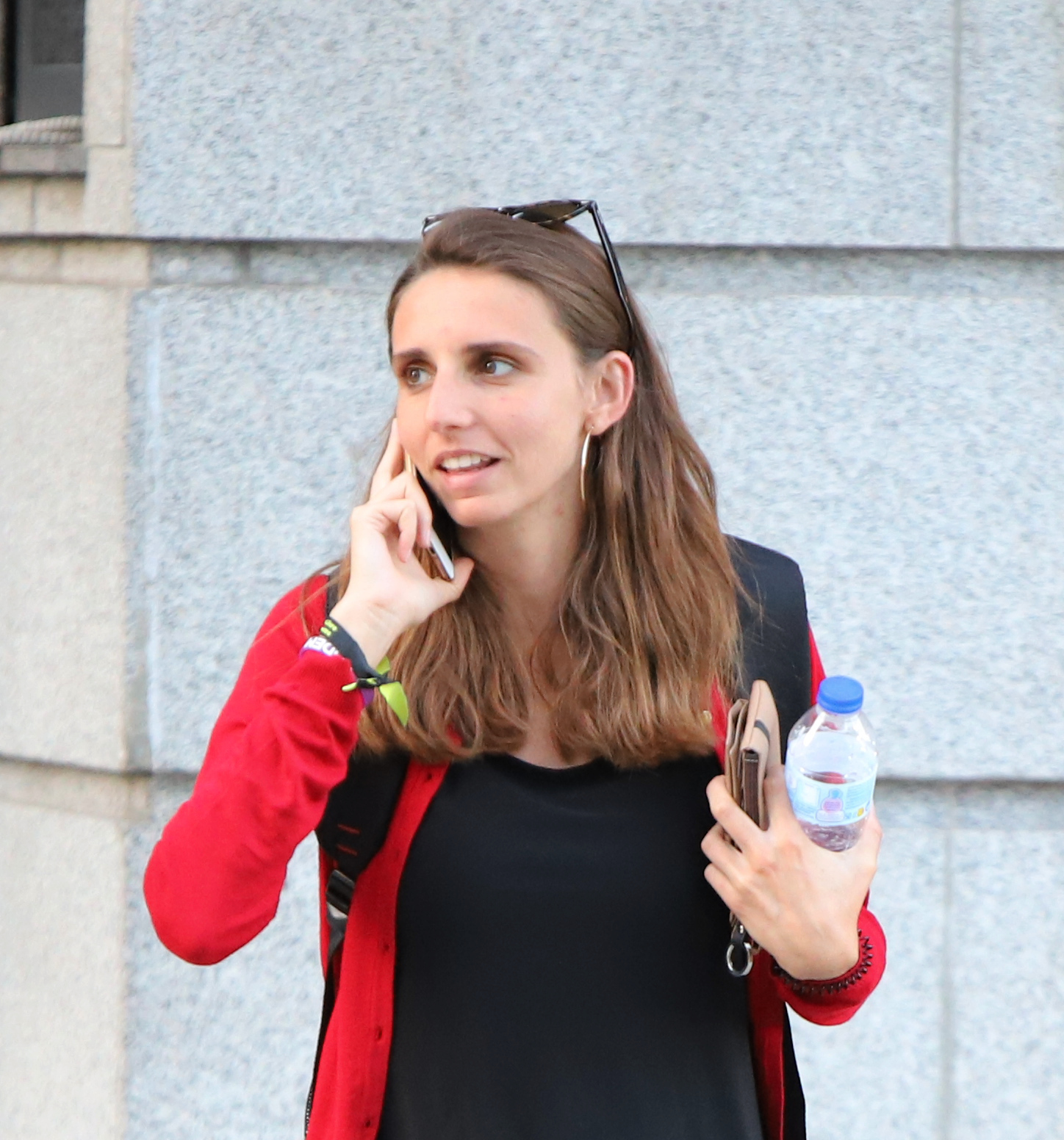
- Muñoz in 2019

Member of the Congress of Deputies
- In office 19 May 2019 – 17 August 2023
- Constituency: Balearic Islands

Personal details
- Born: 25 September 1993 (age 32)
- Party: Podemos

Lucía Miriam Muñoz Dalda (born 25 September 1993) is a Spanish politician serving as coordinator of Podemos in the Balearic Islands since 2024. From 2019 to 2023, she was a member of the Congress of Deputies.
