= 2024 PSOE federal party congress =

- 13 October 2024 (primary) (Note: The primary election was left uncontested on 19 September, as a result of Pedro Sánchez's candidacy being the only one fielded.); 29 November – 1 December 2024 (congress)

1,101 delegates in the Federal Congress Plurality of delegates needed to win
- Opinion polls
- Turnout: Executive: 1,028 (93.4%); Committee: 1,034 (93.9%)
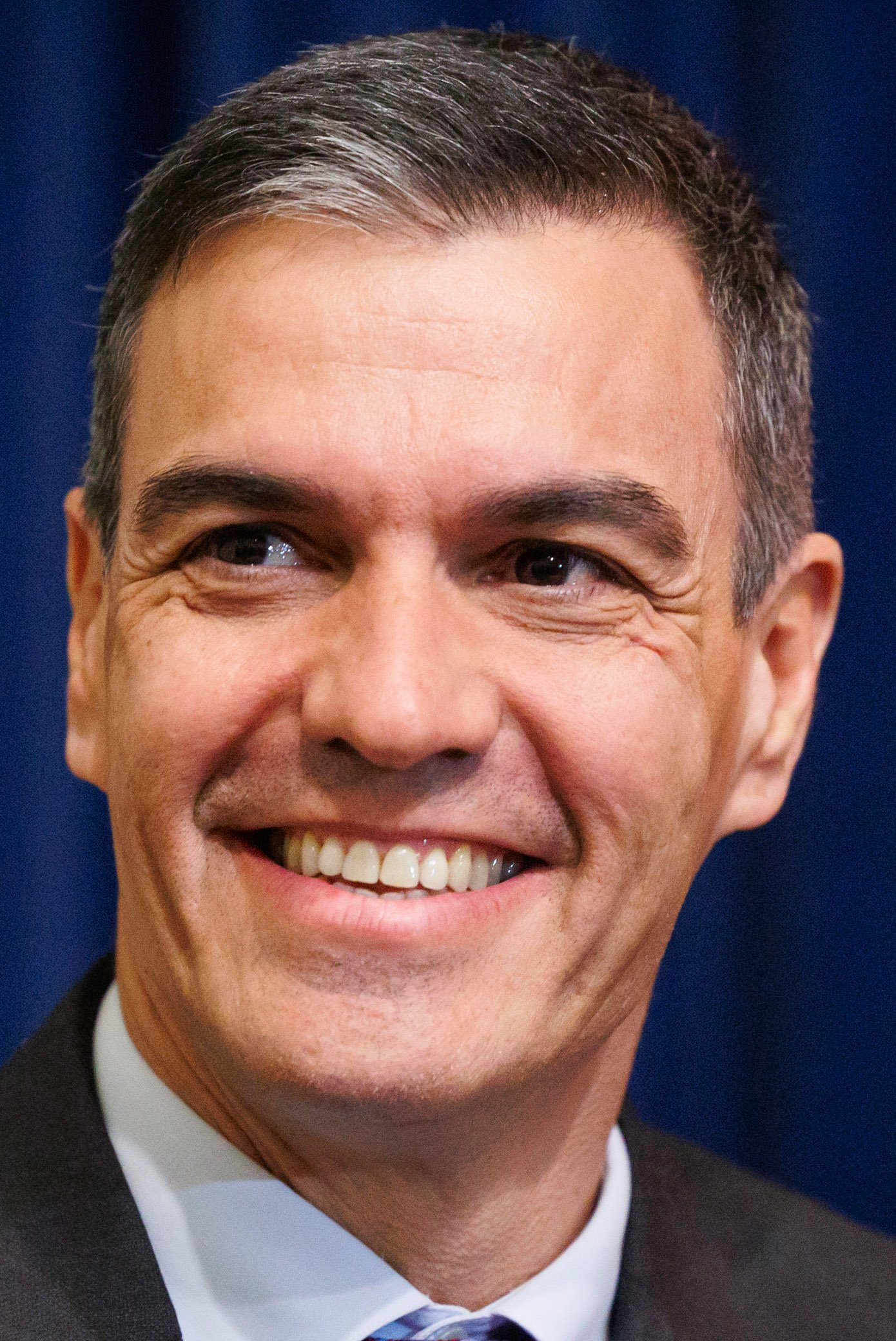

Candidate	Pedro Sánchez	Blank ballots
Popular vote	Uncontested	Uncontested
Executive	925 (90.8%)	94 (9.2%)
Committee	931 (90.7%)	96 (9.3%)
Party leader before election
Pedro Sánchez
Party leader after
election
Pedro Sánchez

The Spanish Socialist Workers' Party (PSOE) held its 41st federal congress in Seville from 29 November to 1 December 2024, to renovate its governing bodies—including the post of secretary-general, which amounted to that of party leader, through a primary election—and establish the party platform and policy until the next congress.

The congress was scheduled to be held in 2025, but following the 2023 local, regional and general elections, plans were made to bring it forward to late 2024, in order to allow for the renewal of the party's regional branches—most of which had been swept from power as a result of the 28 May 2023 elections—in time for the 2027 elections. In late April 2024, the PSOE was briefly thrown into a leadership crisis as party leader and then prime minister of Spain Pedro Sánchez announced his intention to reflect on his political future, which included a possible resignation and retirement from Spanish politics; Sánchez ultimately chose to continue and run for another term as party leader, but the crisis sparked an internal debate on his future succession.

A primary election to elect the PSOE secretary-general was initially scheduled for 13 October, but as no candidate opposing Sánchez ran for election, he was re-elected unopposed.

== Background ==
The local and regional elections on 28 May 2023 resulted in the Spanish Socialist Workers' Party (PSOE) losing much of its territorial power to the opposition People's Party (PP), prompting Pedro Sánchez, the party's secretary-general and prime minister of Spain, to call an early general election for 23 July. The negative electoral outlook—with opinion polls predicting a scenario similar to that of the local and regional elections, with a right-wing majority between the PP and far-right Vox being the most likely outcome—fueled speculation about an imminent internal crisis with one of the following outcomes: Sánchez's resignation and the holding of an extraordinary PSOE congress after the summer, an attempt by Sánchez to cling to his position as party leader, or his overthrow by internal rivals. However, the PSOE surged during the campaign and thwarted the possibility of a PP–Vox majority, allowing Sánchez to retain the Spanish government through inter-party negotiations as well as reinforcing his leadership within the party.

Following the party's defeat in the 2024 Galician regional election, it was speculated that Sánchez could call an extraordinary congress to renovate the entire executive commission before the next scheduled regional elections in the Basque Country and Catalonia and the nationwide European Parliament election. In April 2024, the PSOE was briefly thrown into disarray after Sánchez announced a five-day reflection on his political future—a result of an ongoing judicial investigation on his wife, Begoña Gómez—during which he remained silent and self-confined in the prime ministerial residence at Moncloa Palace, with no apparent successor in the event of a prospective resignation. Sánchez ultimately chose to continue, denouncing a "harassment and bullying operation" and vowing to fight "even harder" as prime minister. While this solved the crisis for the time being, it sparked an internal debate on Sánchez's succession which the PSOE's leadership was tempted to quell by postponing the congress until the end of 2025.

The party ultimately chose to go ahead with initial plans to bring the ordinary congress forward one year to late 2024, in order to hasten the renovation of its regional branches ahead of the 2027 local and regional elections. The congress was announced on 30 August 2024 and officially called on 7 September. Initially planned for 15–17 November 2024, the congress was delayed two weeks for "logistical reasons".

== Overview ==
=== Role ===
The federal congress of the PSOE is the party's highest decision-making body, having the power to define its platform and policy, amend its statutes and internal regulations and elect its federal governing bodies, which included the executive commission (responsible for the party's day-to-day management under the coordination of a secretary-general, which was the party leader) and one-third of the members in the federal committee (made up of party notables and elected representatives, which was the PSOE's highest body between congresses).

Depending on whether a congress was held following the natural end of its term or due to any other exceptional circumstances, it could be of either ordinary or extraordinary nature. Ordinary congresses were to be held every three or four years and called at least 45 days in advance—though they could be postponed by the federal committee for up to one additional year when there were sufficient reasons to justify it—whereas extraordinary congresses could be called at any time by the federal committee or by the executive commission, as well as when requested by more than half of the party's membership, but were limited to the specific purpose for which they were convened.

=== Procedure ===
Decisions at PSOE party congresses were adopted through delegate voting. The 500 to 2,000 congress delegates—with the exact number being determined by the federal committee—were elected by party members and direct affiliates of the corresponding territorial area and in full enjoyment of their political rights, using closed list proportional representation and a majority bonus of half-plus-one of the delegates at stake being awarded to the candidacy winning a plurality of votes; the remaining delegates were distributed among all other candidacies, provided that they secured over 20 percent of the votes. Candidates seeking to lead a congress delegation were required to collect the endorsements of between 12 and 15 percent of members in the territorial scope for which they sought election. In the event of only one candidate meeting this requirement, the election was to be left uncontested, with such candidate being granted the right to appoint half-plus-one of the delegation and the corresponding territorial executive commission appointing the rest.

The election of the secretary-general was on the basis of a two-round primary election system; if no candidate secured over 50 percent of votes in the first round, a second round was to be held between the two candidates receiving the most votes. Voting in the primaries comprised all members and direct affiliates of the PSOE, the Socialists' Party of Catalonia (PSC), the Socialist Youth of Spain (JSE) and the Socialist Youth of Catalonia (JSC). Candidates seeking to run were required to collect the endorsements of between three and five percent of members. In the event of only one candidate meeting this requirement, the primaries were to be left uncontested with such candidate being elected unopposed.

=== Timetable ===
The key dates of the congress process are listed below (all times are CET):

- 7 September: Official announcement of the congress.
- Secretary-General primaries:
  - 12 September: Start of pre-candidacy submission period.
  - 19 September: End of pre-candidacy submission period (at 12 pm).
  - 20 September: Start of endorsement collection period.
  - 30 September: End of endorsement collection period (at 12 pm).
  - 1 October: Provisional proclamation of candidates.
  - 2 October: Definitive proclamation of candidates.
  - 3 October: Official start of internal information campaign.
  - 12 October: Last day of internal information campaign.
  - 13 October: First round of voting; provisional proclamation of first round results.
  - 15 October: Definitive proclamation of first round results; proclamation of elected secretary-general (if half-plus-one of votes).
  - 20 October: Second round of voting (if required); provisional proclamation of second round results.
  - 22 October: Definitive proclamation of second round results; proclamation of elected secretary-general (if second round is required).
- Congress delegation elections:
  - 24 September: Start of pre-candidacy submission period.
  - 30 September: End of pre-candidacy submission period (at 12 pm).
  - 2 October: Start of endorsement collection period.
  - 9 October: End of endorsement collection period (at 12 pm); provisional proclamation of candidates.
  - 10 October: Definitive proclamation of candidates.
  - 13 October: Deadline for candidates to submit proposed lists of delegates; provisional proclamation of proposed lists.
  - 15 October: Definitive proclamation of proposed lists.
  - 20 October: Election of congress delegations; provisional proclamation of congress delegations.
  - 22 October: Definitive proclamation of congress delegations.
- 29 November: Start of federal congress.

== Candidates ==
Candidate	Notable positions	Announced	Ref.
=== Proclaimed ===
Candidates who met endorsement requirements and were officially proclaimed to contest the party congress.
Pedro Sánchez (age 52)	President of the Socialist International (since 2022); Prime Minister of Spain (since 2018); Secretary-General of the PSOE (2014–2016 and since 2017); Member of the Congress of Deputies for Madrid (2009–2011, 2013–2016 and since 2019); President pro tempore of the Council of the European Union (2023); Leader of the Opposition of Spain (2014–2016 and 2017–2018); City Councillor of Madrid (2004–2009)	7 September 2024	

=== Declined ===
The individuals in this section were the subject of speculation about their possible candidacy, but publicly denied or recanted interest in running:

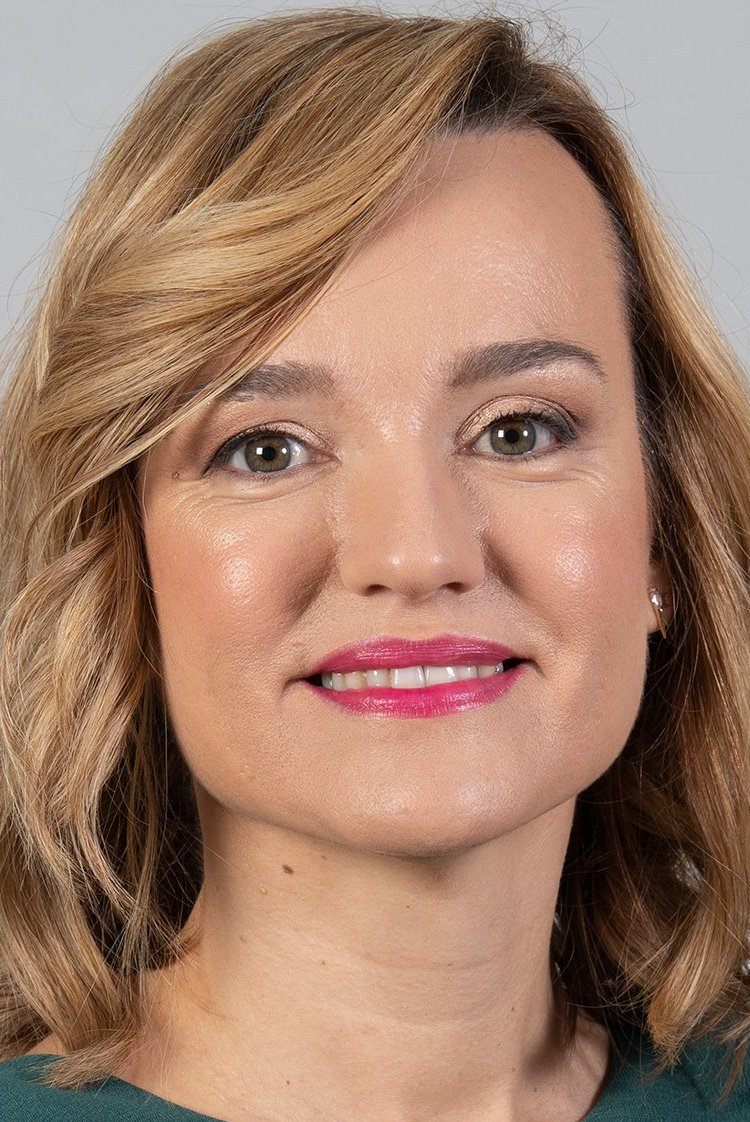
Pilar Alegría

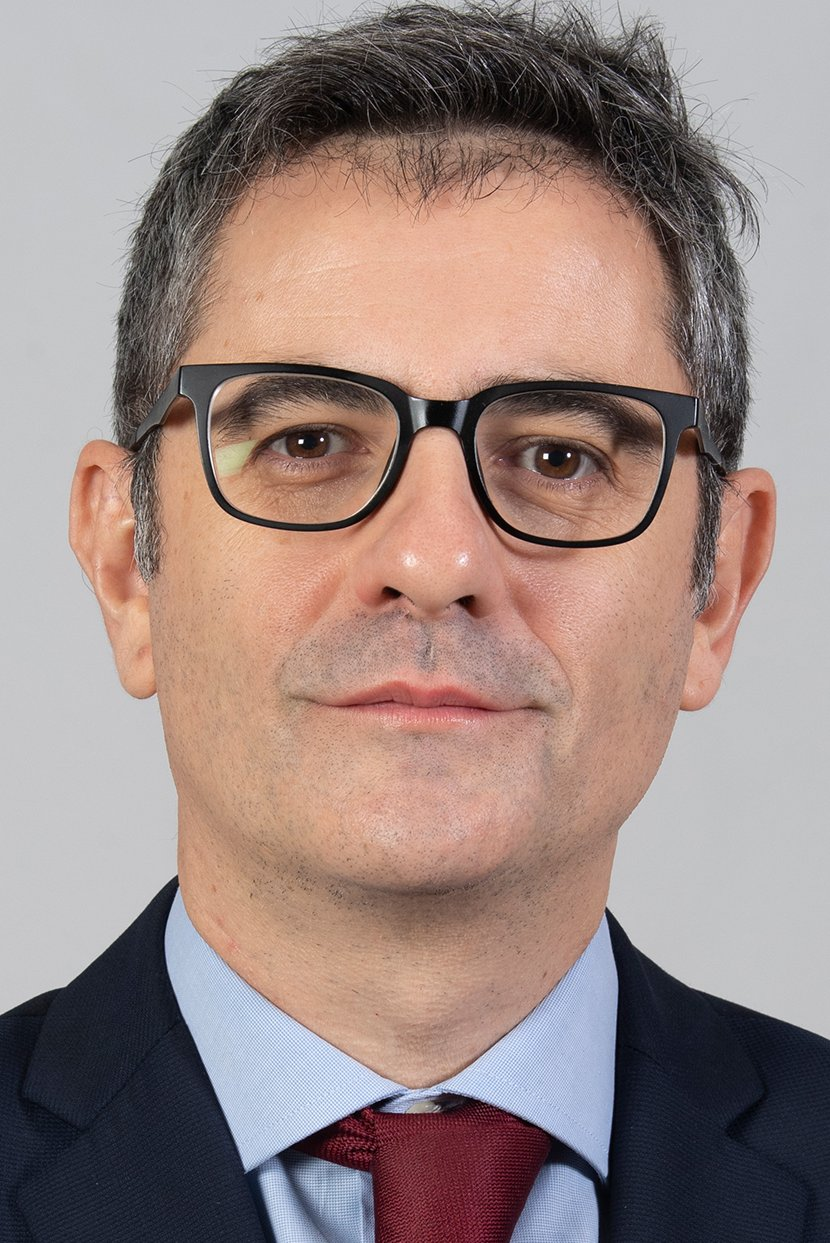
Félix Bolaños

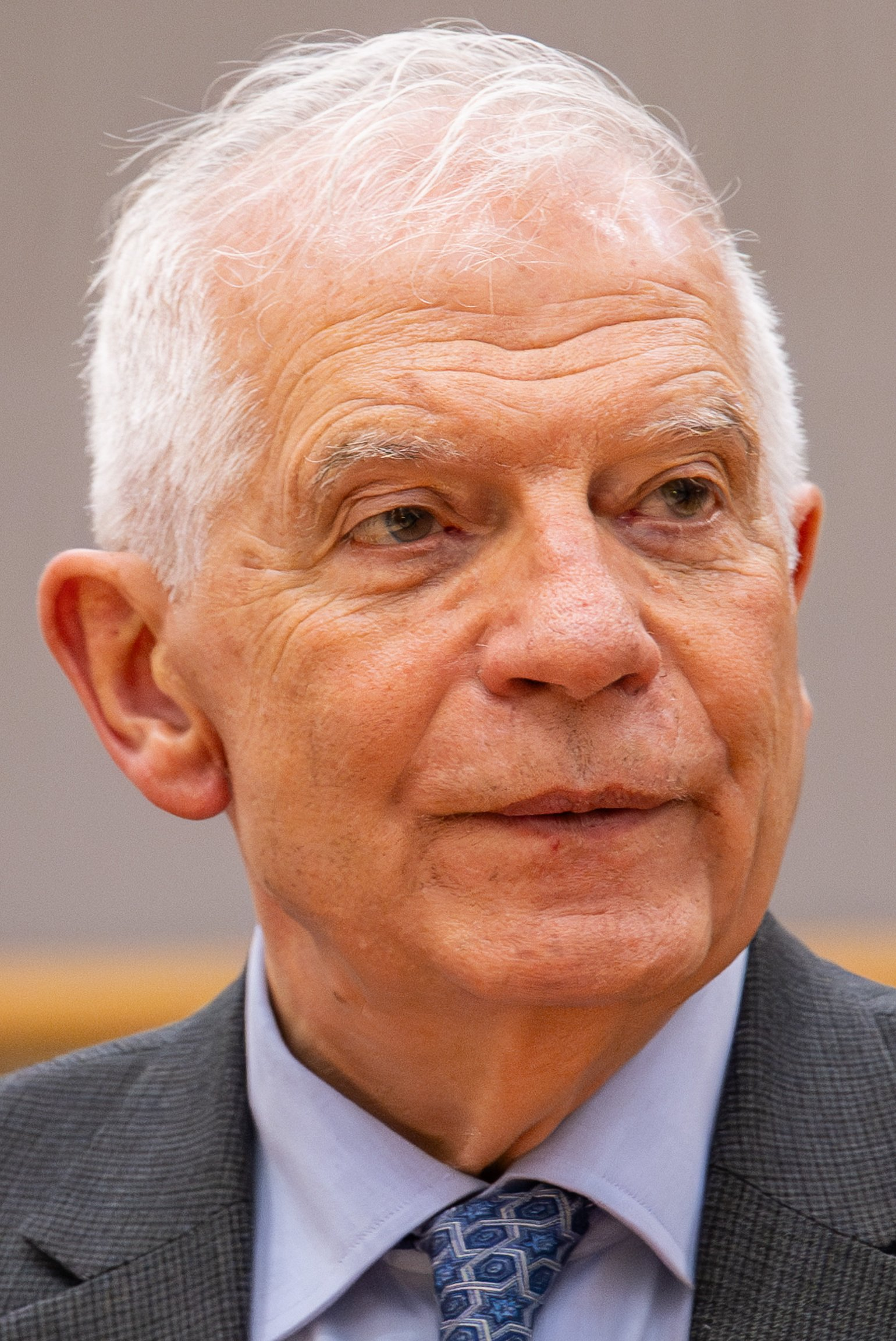
Josep Borrell

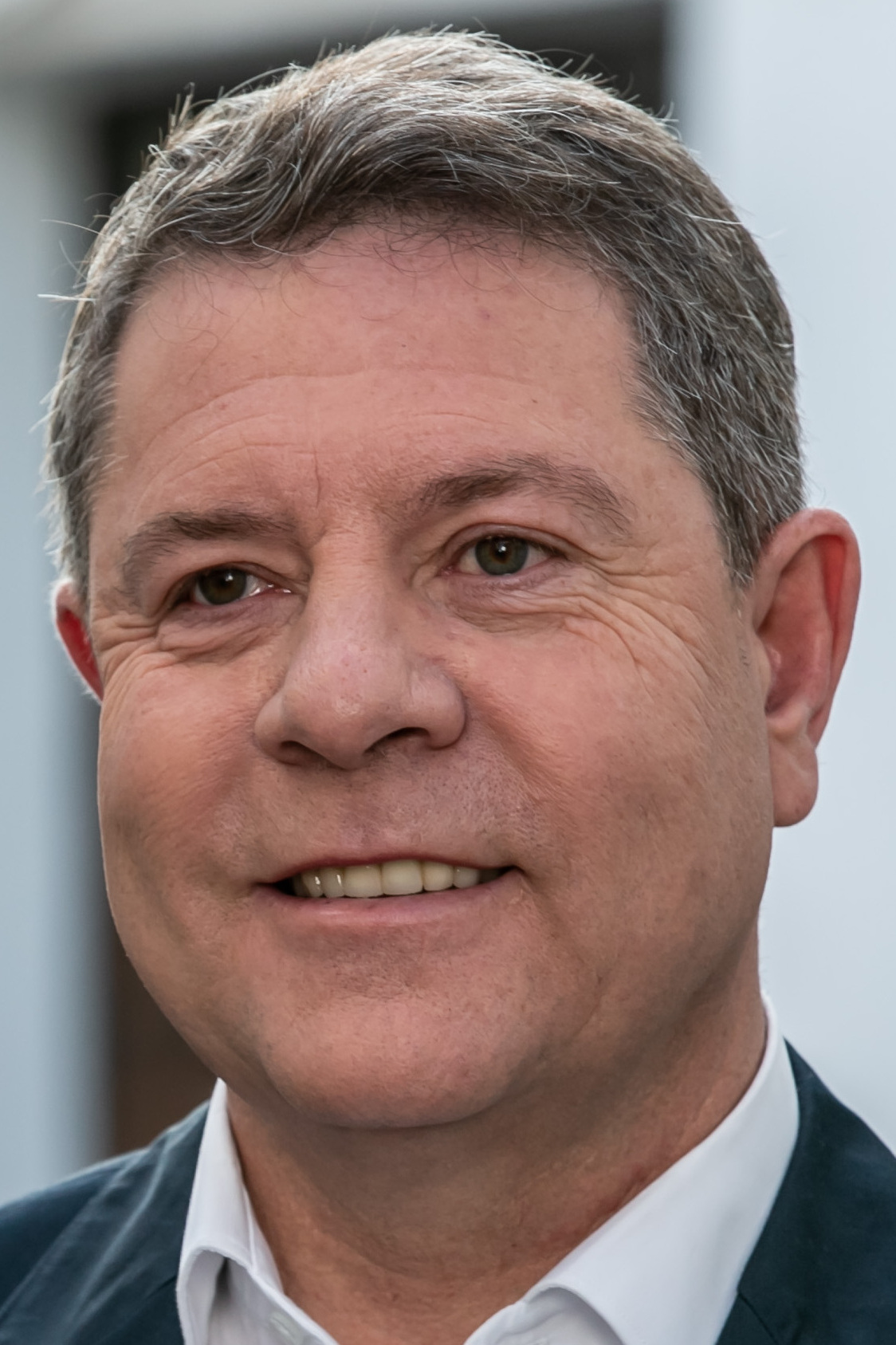
Emiliano García-Page

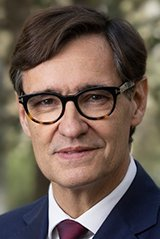
Salvador Illa
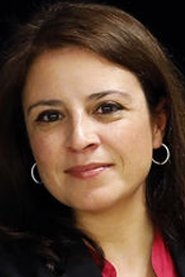
Adriana Lastra

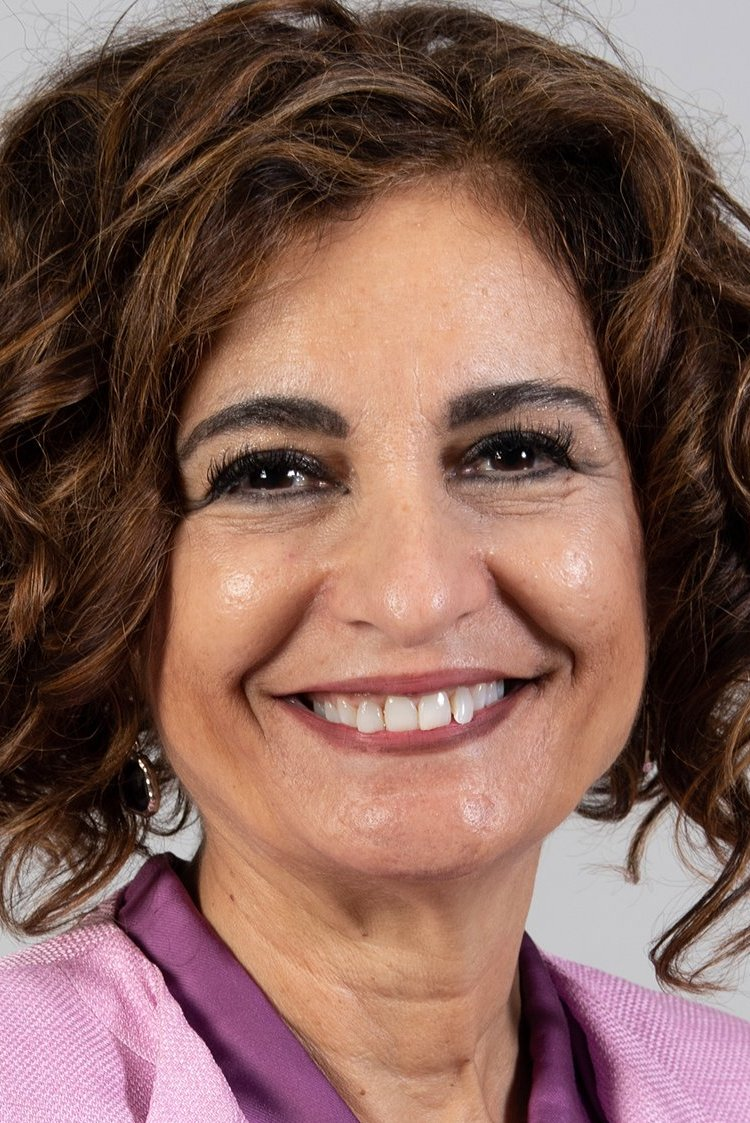
María Jesús Montero

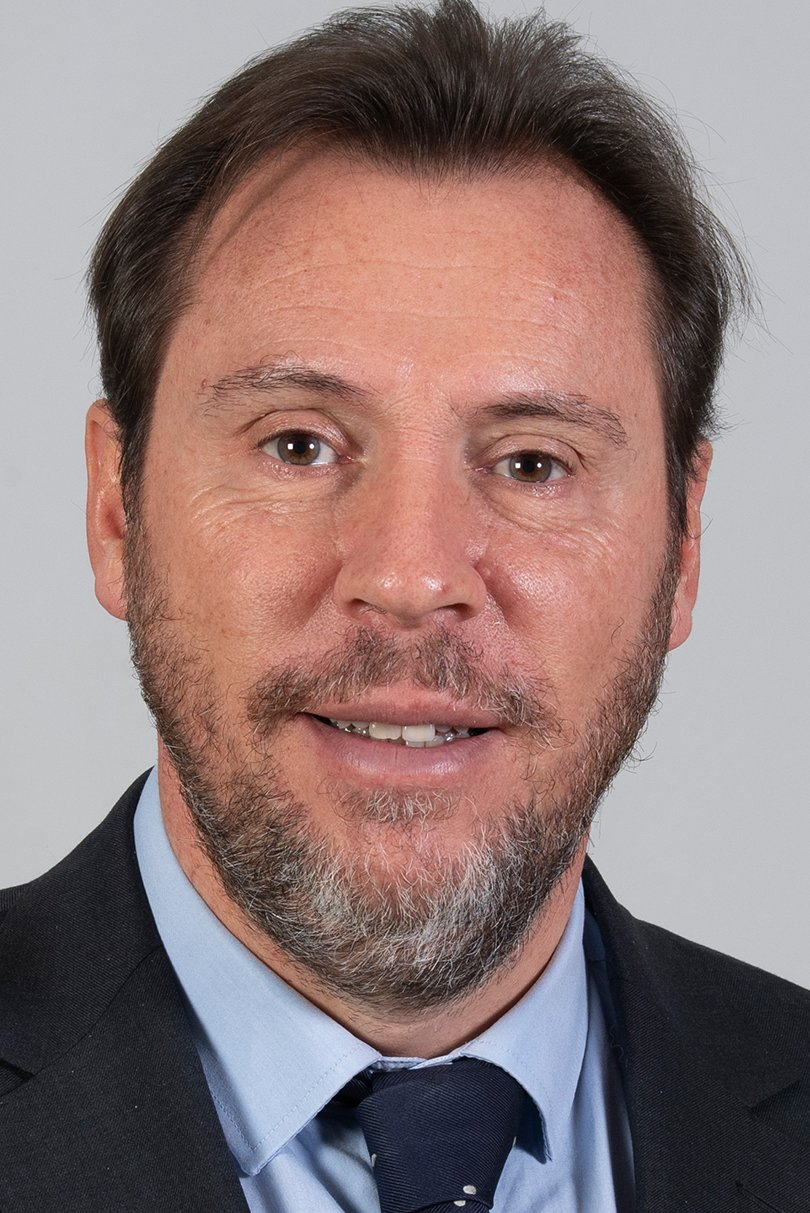
Óscar Puente

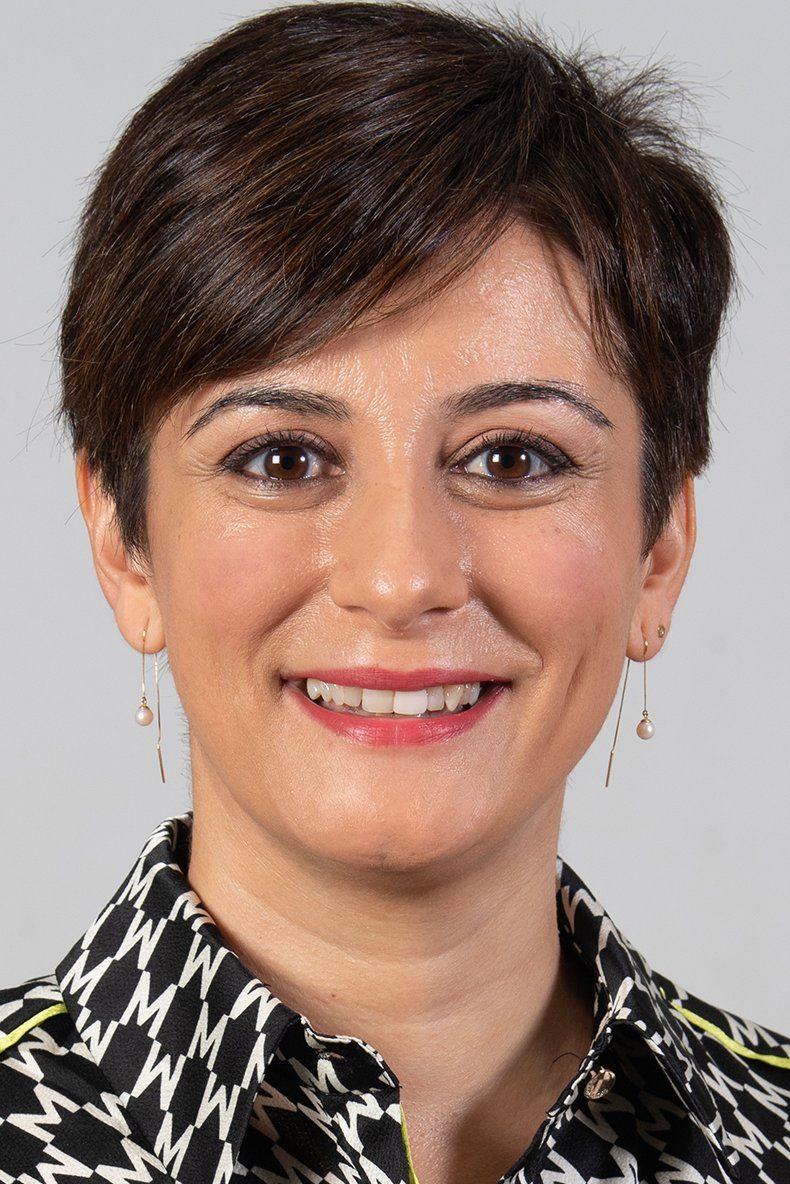
Isabel Rodríguez

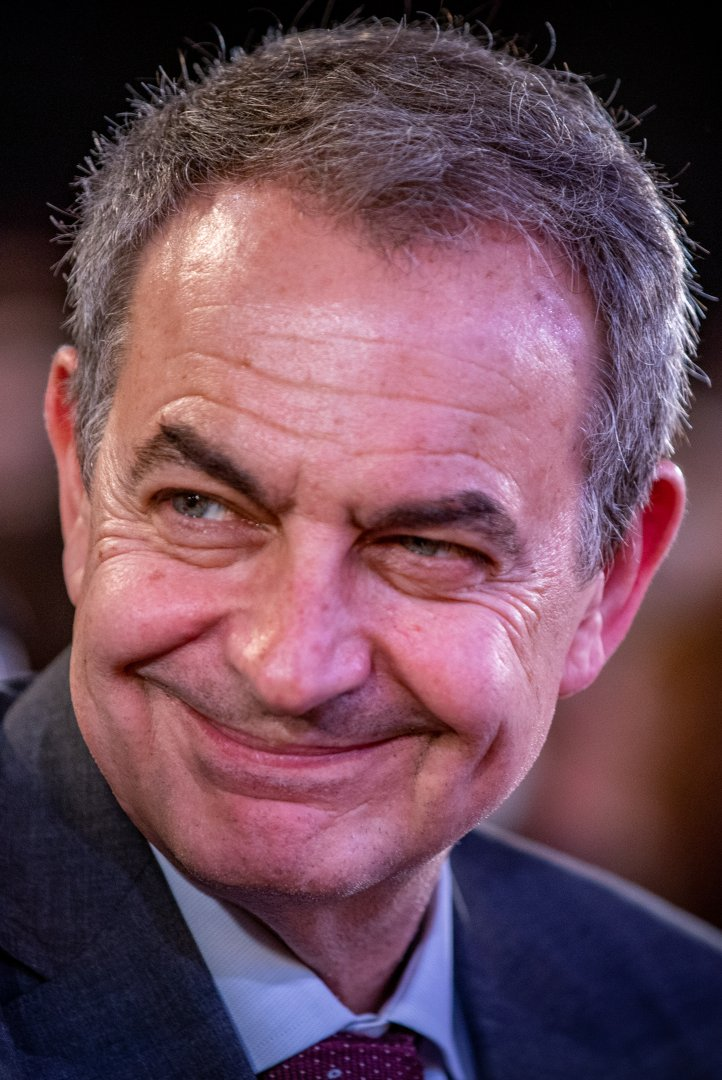
José Luis Rodríguez Zapatero
- Pilar Alegría (age 47) — Minister of Education, Vocational Training and Sports of Spain (since 2023); Spokesperson of the Government of Spain (since 2023); Member of the Congress of Deputies for Zaragoza (2008–2015 and since 2023); Spokesperson of the PSOE Executive Commission (2022–2024); Minister of Education and Vocational Training of Spain (2021–2023); Delegate of the Government of Spain in Aragon (2020–2021); Spokesperson of the Socialist Group in the City Council of Zaragoza (2019–2020); City Councillor of Zaragoza (2019–2020); Minister of Innovation, Research and University of Aragon (2015–2019); Member of the Cortes of Aragon for Zaragoza (2015–2019); Secretary of Organization of the PSA–PSOE (2014–2017); Member of the PSOE Executive Commission (2008–2012).
- Félix Bolaños (age 48) — Minister of the Presidency, Justice and Relations with the Cortes of Spain (since 2023); Member of the Congress of Deputies for Madrid (since 2023); Secretary of Constitutional Reform and New Rights of the PSOE (since 2021); Minister of the Presidency, Relations with the Cortes and Democratic Memory of Spain (2021–2023); Secretary-General of the Office of the Prime Minister of Spain (2018–2021).
- Josep Borrell (age 77) — High Representative of the Union for Foreign Affairs and Security Policy (since 2019); Vice-President of the European Commission (since 2019); Minister of Foreign Affairs, European Union and Cooperation of Spain (2018–2019); Member of the European Parliament for Spain (2004–2009); President of the European Parliament (2004–2007); Member of the Congress of Deputies for Barcelona (1986–2004); Member of the PSOE Executive Commission (1997–2000); Leader of the Opposition of Spain (1998–1999); Spokesperson of the Socialist Group of the Congress (1998–1999); Minister of Public Works, Transport and Environment of Spain (1993–1996); Minister of Public Works and Urbanism of Spain (1991–1993); Secretary of State of Finance of Spain (1984–1991); Secretary-General of Budget and Public Expenditure of Spain (1982–1984); City Councillor of Majadahonda (1979–1983).
- Emiliano García-Page (age 56) — President of the Regional Government of Castilla–La Mancha (since 2015); Member of the Cortes of Castilla–La Mancha for Toledo (1995–2007 and since 2015); Member of the PSOE Executive Commission (2012–2016); Senator appointed by the Cortes of Castilla–La Mancha (2011–2015); Mayor of Toledo (2007–2015); City Councillor of Toledo (1987–1993 and 2007–2015); Secretary-General of the PSCM–PSOE in the province of Toledo (1997–2012); Second Vice President of the Regional Government of Castilla–La Mancha (2005–2007); Minister of Institutional Relations of Castilla–La Mancha (2004–2005); Minister-Spokersperson of Castilla–La Mancha (1993–1997, 1998–1999 and 2001–2004); Spokesperson of the Socialist Group in the Cortes of Castilla–La Mancha (2000–2001); Minister of Social Welfare of Castilla–La Mancha (1999–2000); Minister of Public Works of Castilla–La Mancha (1997–1998); Deputy Mayor for Celebrations of Toledo (1991–1993).
- Salvador Illa (age 58) — President of the Government of Catalonia (since 2024); First Secretary of the PSC (since 2021); Member of the Parliament of Catalonia for Barcelona (since 2021); Leader of the Opposition of Catalonia (2021–2024); Minister of Health of Spain (2020–2021); Secretary of Organization of the PSC (2016–2021); Director for the Management Service of Barcelona (2010–2011); Director-General for Infrastructure Management of Catalonia (2005–2009); Mayor of La Roca del Vallès (1995–2005); City Councillor of La Roca del Vallès (1987–2005).
- Adriana Lastra (age 45) — Delegate of the Government of Spain in Asturias (since 2024); Member of the Congress of Deputies for Asturias (2016–2024); Deputy Secretary-General of the PSOE (2017–2022); Spokesperson of the Socialist Parliamentary Group in the Congress (2018–2021); Secretary of Local Policy of the PSOE (2014–2016); Member of the General Junta of the Principality of Asturias for the Eastern District (2007–2015); Secretary of Local Policy of the FSA–PSOE (2008–2014); Secretary of Social Movements and NGOs of the FSA–PSOE (2004–2008); Member of the FSA–PSOE Executive Commission (2000–2004).
- María Jesús Montero (age 58) — First Deputy Prime Minister of Spain (since 2023); Minister of Finance of Spain (2018–2021 and since 2023); Deputy Secretary-General of the PSOE (since 2022); Member of the Congress of Deputies for Seville (since 2019); Fourth Deputy Prime Minister of Spain (2023); Minister of Finance and Civil Service of Spain (2021–2023); Spokesperson of the Government of Spain (2020–2021); Minister of Finance and Public Administrations of Andalusia (2013–2018); Member of the Parliament of Andalusia for Seville (2008–2012 and 2013–2018); Minister of Health and Social Welfare of Andalusia (2012–2013); Minister of Health and Consumer Affairs of Andalusia (2004–2012).
- Óscar Puente (age 56) — Minister of Transport and Sustainable Mobility of Spain (since 2023); Member of the Congress of Deputies for Valladolid (since 2023); Secretary-General of the PSOE in the province of Valladolid (since 2021); Mayor of Valladolid (2015–2023); City Councillor of Valladolid (2007–2023); Spokesperson of the PSOE Executive Commission (2017–2021).
- Isabel Rodríguez (age 43) — Minister of Housing and Urban Agenda of Spain (since 2023); Member of the Congress of Deputies for Ciudad Real (2011–2019 and 2023); Minister of Territorial Policy of Spain (2021–2023); Spokesperson of the Government of Spain (2021–2023); Mayor of Puertollano (2019–2021); City Councillor of Puertollano (2019–2021); Spokersperson of the Government of Castilla–La Mancha (2008–2011); Secretary of Communication and Spokesperson of the PSCM–PSOE (2008–2011); Director-General for Youth of Castilla–La Mancha (2007–2008); Secretary-General of the JSCLM in the province of Ciudad Real (2005–2008); Senator for Ciudad Real (2004–2007).
- José Luis Rodríguez Zapatero (age 64) — Member of the Council of State (2012–2015); Secretary-General of the PSOE (2000–2012); Prime Minister of Spain (2004–2011); Member of the Congress of Deputies for Madrid (2004–2011); President pro tempore of the Council of the European Union (2010); Leader of the Opposition of Spain (2000–2004); Member of the Congress of Deputies for León (1986–2004); Member of the PSOE Executive Commission (1997–2000); Secretary-General of the PSOE in the province of León (1988–2000).

== Opinion polls ==
Poll results are listed in the tables below in reverse chronological order, showing the most recent first, and using the date the survey's fieldwork was done, as opposed to the date of publication. If such date is unknown, the date of publication is given instead. The highest percentage figure in each polling survey is displayed in bold, and the background shaded in the candidate's colour. In the instance of a tie, the figures with the highest percentages are shaded. Polls show data gathered among PSOE voters/supporters as well as Spanish voters as a whole, but not among party members, who are the ones ultimately entitled to vote in the primary election.

=== PSOE voters ===
Polling firm/Commissioner	Fieldwork date	Sample size			Other /None	Question	Lead
Polling firm/Commissioner	Fieldwork date	Sample size	Sánchez (Inc.)	Page	Other /None	Question	Lead
EM-Analytics/Electomanía	27 Jan–2 Feb 2024	?	**85.4**	7.1	7.5	–	78.3

=== Spanish voters ===
Polling firm/Commissioner	Fieldwork date	Sample size			Other /None	Question	Lead
Polling firm/Commissioner	Fieldwork date	Sample size	Sánchez (Inc.)	Page	Other /None	Question	Lead
EM-Analytics/Electomanía	27 Jan–2 Feb 2024	1,614	**45.0**	36.6	18.4	–	8.4

== Results ==
=== Overall ===
Summary of the 1 December 2024 PSOE congress results
Candidate	Executive		Committee	
Candidate	Votes	%	Votes	%
Pedro Sánchez	925	90.78	931	90.65
Blank ballots	94	9.22	96	9.35
Total	1,019		1,027	
Valid votes	1,019	99.12	1,027	99.32
Invalid votes	9	0.88	7	0.68
Votes cast / turnout	1,028	93.37	1,034	93.91
Not voting	73	6.63	67	6.09
Total delegates	1,101		1,101	

Vote by delegates (Executive Commission)
Sánchez	90.78%
Blank ballots	9.22%

Vote by delegates (Federal Committee)
Sánchez	90.65%
Blank ballots	9.35%

=== Executive composition ===
The composition of the newly elected Executive Commission was as follows:

PSOE federal executive commission
Post	Officeholder
President	Cristina Narbona
Secretary-General	Pedro Sánchez
Deputy Secretary-General	María Jesús Montero
Secretary of Organization	Santos Cerdán
Deputy Secretary of Organization	Juan Francisco Serrano Martínez
Secretary of Equality	Pilar Bernabé
Spokesperson	Esther Peña
Secretary of Institutional Policy and Training	Alfonso Rodríguez Gómez de Celis
Secretary of Regional Policy	Guillermo Fernández Vara
Secretary of Local Policy	Alejandro Soler Mur
Secretary of Coastal Municipalities	Anabel Mateos
Secretary of Electoral Action and Analysis	Paco Salazar
Secretary of International Policy and Cooperation	Hana Jalloul
Secretary of Cities and Metropolitan Areas	Javier Ayala
Secretary of Rural Environment	Elisa Garrido Jiménez
Secretary of Studies and Programs	Javier Izquierdo
Secretary of Housing	Isabel Rodríguez
Secretary of Transport and Sustainable Mobility	Arcadi España
Secretary of European Union	Iratxe García
Secretary of Justice	Félix Bolaños
Secretary of Constitutional Reform and New Rights	Francisco Lucas Ayala
Secretary of Industry	Jordi Hereu
Secretary of Trade and Consumer Affairs	Nora Abete
Secretary of Science, Innovation and Universities	Javier Alfonso Cendón
Secretary of Tourism	Aroa Jilete González
Secretary of Just Transition	Marc Pons
Secretary of Economic Policy and Digital Transformation	Enma López Araújo
Secretary of Culture and Sports	Manuela Villa
Secretary of the Toledo Pact and Social Inclusion	Iván Fernández García
Secretary of Labour, Social Economy and Self-Employed	Montse Mínguez
Secretary of Education and Vocational Training	Ana María Fernández Rodríguez
Secretary of Democratic Memory and Secularism	Manuel García Salgado
Secretary of Social Policies, Seniors and Social Movements	Manuela Berges Barreras
Secretary of Democratic Action and Transparency	Borja Cabezón
Secretary of Health	Kilian Sánchez San Juan
Secretary of Entrepreneurship and Social Impact	Elma Saiz
Secretary of Agriculture, Livestock and Fisheries	Ana María Romero Obrero
Secretary of LGTBI	Víctor Gutiérrez
Secretary of Migration Policies and Refugees	Luc André Diouf
Secretary of PSOE Abroad	César Mogo
Member without portfolio	Pilar Alegría
Member without portfolio	Tania Baños Martos
Member without portfolio	Abel Caballero
Member without portfolio	Jorge Gallardo Gandulla
Member without portfolio	Eugenia Gómez de Diego
Member without portfolio	Sabrina Moh Abdelkader
Member without portfolio	Óscar Puente
Member without portfolio	María Jesús Sánchez Jódar
Member without portfolio	Milagros Tolón

== Bibliography ==
- Estatutos Federales (40 Congreso) (PDF) (Party Statutes). Spanish Socialist Workers' Party (in Spanish). 17 October 2021. Archived from the original (PDF) on 2022-10-17.
- Reglamento Federal de desarrollo de los Estatutos Federales (40 Congreso) (PDF) (Party Regulation). Spanish Socialist Workers' Party (in Spanish). 7 January 2022 [version as of 9 October 2023].
- PSOE Federal Committee (7 September 2024). "Bases de convocatoria para la celebración del 41 Congreso PSOE" (PDF) (in Spanish). Spanish Socialist Workers' Party.
