= Next PSOE federal party congress =

- No later than 2028

All delegates in the Federal Congress Plurality of delegates needed to win
- Opinion polls
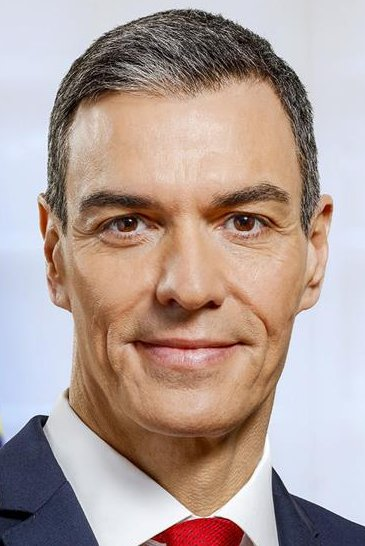
Candidate	Pedro Sánchez
Incumbent Party leader
Pedro Sánchez

The Spanish Socialist Workers' Party (PSOE) is expected to hold its 42nd federal congress no later than 2028, to renovate its governing bodies—including the post of secretary-general, which amounts to that of party leader, through a primary election—and establish the party platform and policy until the next congress.

== Background ==
The Spanish Socialist Workers' Party (PSOE) was briefly thrown into disarray in April 2024 after party leader and prime minister of Spain, Pedro Sánchez, announced a five-day reflection on his political future—a result of a judicial investigation on his wife, Begoña Gómez—during which he remained silent and self-confined in the prime ministerial residence at Moncloa Palace, with no apparent successor in the event of a prospective resignation. Sánchez ultimately chose to continue, but the crisis evidenced what was described as Sánchez's "hyper-leadership" over his party, which made it difficult to find a replacement. Subsequently, the PSOE congress in late 2024, held one year ahead of schedule, saw the introduction of a number of statutory amendments that reinforced Sánchez's position as secretary-general, such as an increase in the number of endorsements required to contest the post and the elimination of such obligation in the event of only a single candidacy being submitted.

== Overview ==
=== Role ===
The federal congress of the PSOE is the party's highest decision-making body, having the power to define its platform and policy, amend its statutes and internal regulations and elect its federal governing bodies, which include the executive commission (responsible for the party's day-to-day management under the coordination of a secretary-general, which is the party leader) and one-third of the members in the federal committee (made up of party notables and elected representatives, which is the PSOE's highest body between congresses).

Depending on whether a congress is held following the natural end of its term or due to any other exceptional circumstances, it can be of either ordinary or extraordinary nature. Ordinary congresses are to be held every three or four years and called at least 45 days in advance—though they can be postponed by the federal committee for up to one additional year when there are sufficient reasons to justify it—whereas extraordinary congresses can be called at any time by the federal committee or by the executive commission, as well as when requested by more than half of the party's membership, but are limited to the specific purpose for which they are convened.

=== Procedure ===
Decisions at PSOE party congresses are adopted through delegate voting. The 500 to 2,000 congress delegates—with the exact number being determined by the federal committee—are elected by party members and direct affiliates of the corresponding territorial area and in full enjoyment of their political rights, using closed list proportional representation and a majority bonus of half-plus-one of the delegates at stake being awarded to the candidacy winning a plurality of votes; the remaining delegates are distributed among all other candidacies, provided that they secure over 20 percent of the votes. Candidates seeking to lead a congress delegation are required to collect the endorsements of between 15 and 20 percent of members in the territorial scope for which they seek election. In the event of only one candidate meeting this requirement, the election shall be left uncontested, with such candidate being granted the right to appoint half-plus-one of the delegation and the corresponding territorial executive commission appointing the rest.

The election of the secretary-general is on the basis of a two-round primary election system; if no candidate secures over 50 percent of votes in the first round, a second round shall be held between the two candidates receiving the most votes. Voting in the primaries comprises all members and direct affiliates of the PSOE, the Socialists' Party of Catalonia (PSC), the Socialist Youth of Spain (JSE) and the Socialist Youth of Catalonia (JSC). Candidates seeking to run are required to collect the endorsements of between 10 and 12 percent of members, except when only one candidacy is submitted. In the event of only one candidate meeting this requirement, the primaries shall be left uncontested with such candidate being elected unopposed.

== Candidates ==
Candidate	Notable positions	Ref.
=== Incumbent ===
Incumbent secretary-general.
Pedro Sánchez (age 54)	President of the Socialist International (since 2022); Prime Minister of Spain (since 2018); Secretary-General of the PSOE (2014–2016 and since 2017); Member of the Congress of Deputies for Madrid (2009–2011, 2013–2016 and since 2019); President pro tempore of the Council of the European Union (2023); Leader of the Opposition of Spain (2014–2016 and 2017–2018); City Councillor of Madrid (2004–2009)	

=== Potential ===
The individuals in this section were the subject of speculation about their possible candidacy:

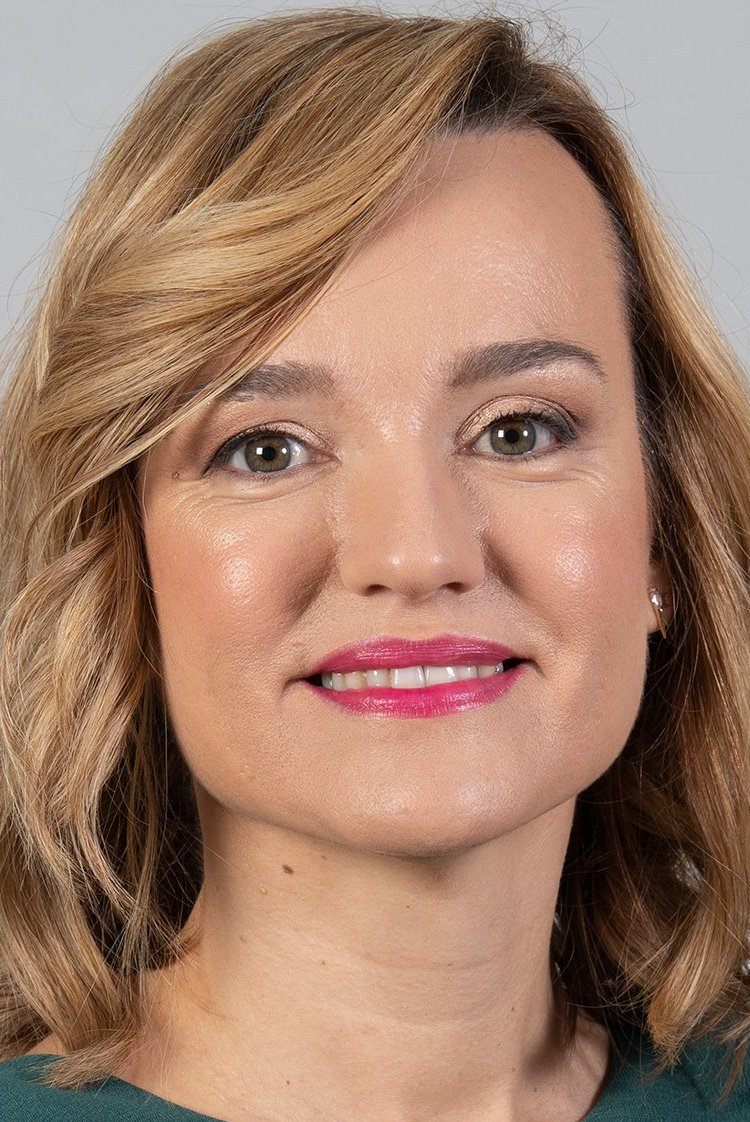
Pilar Alegría

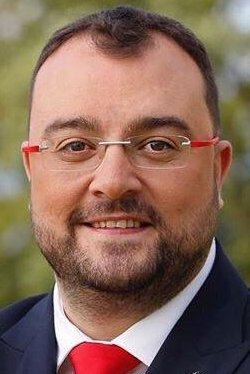
Adrián Barbón

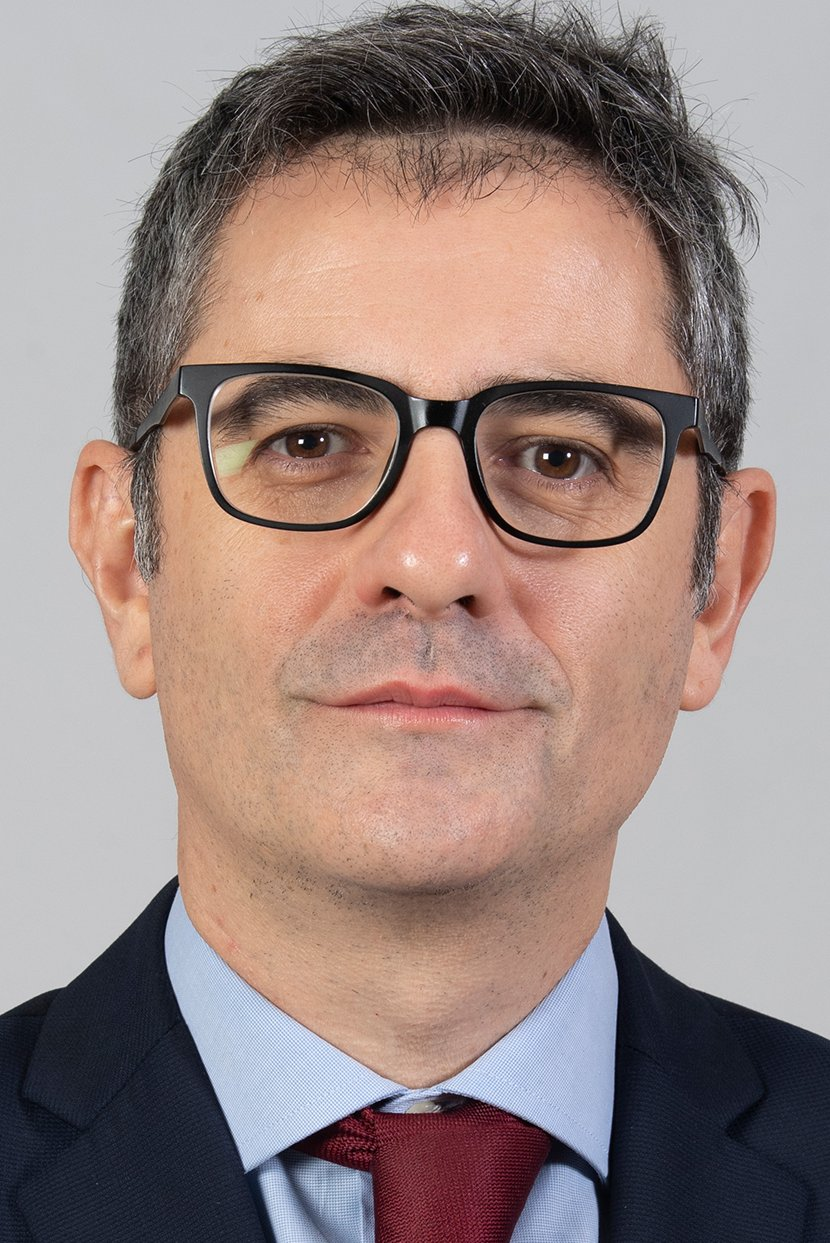
Félix Bolaños

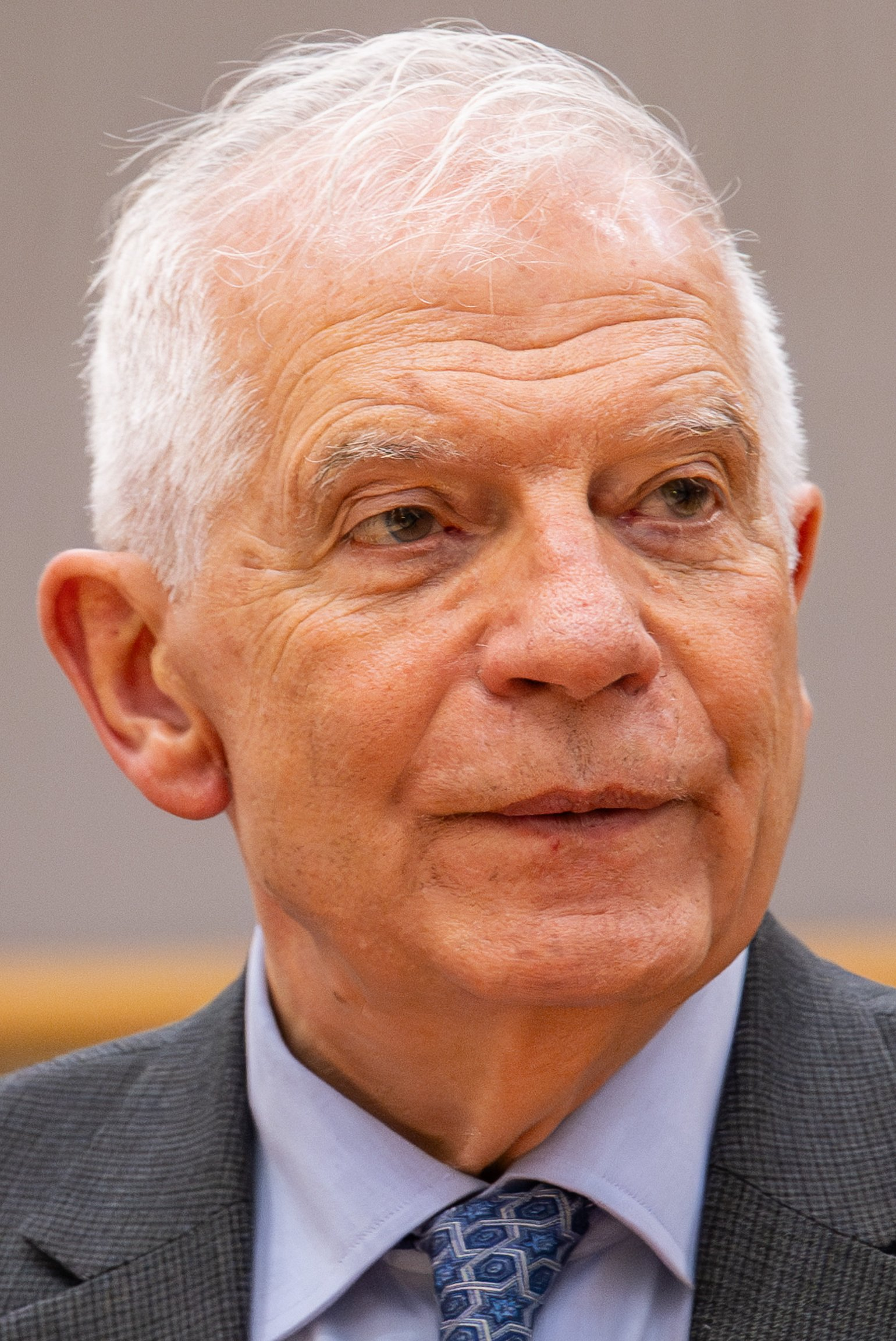
Josep Borrell

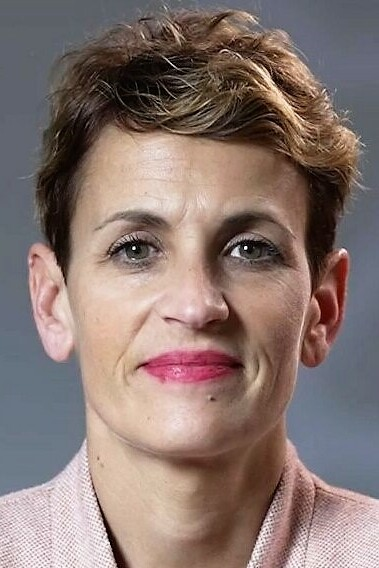
María Chivite
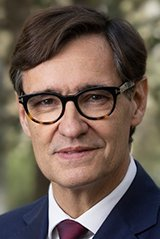
Salvador Illa

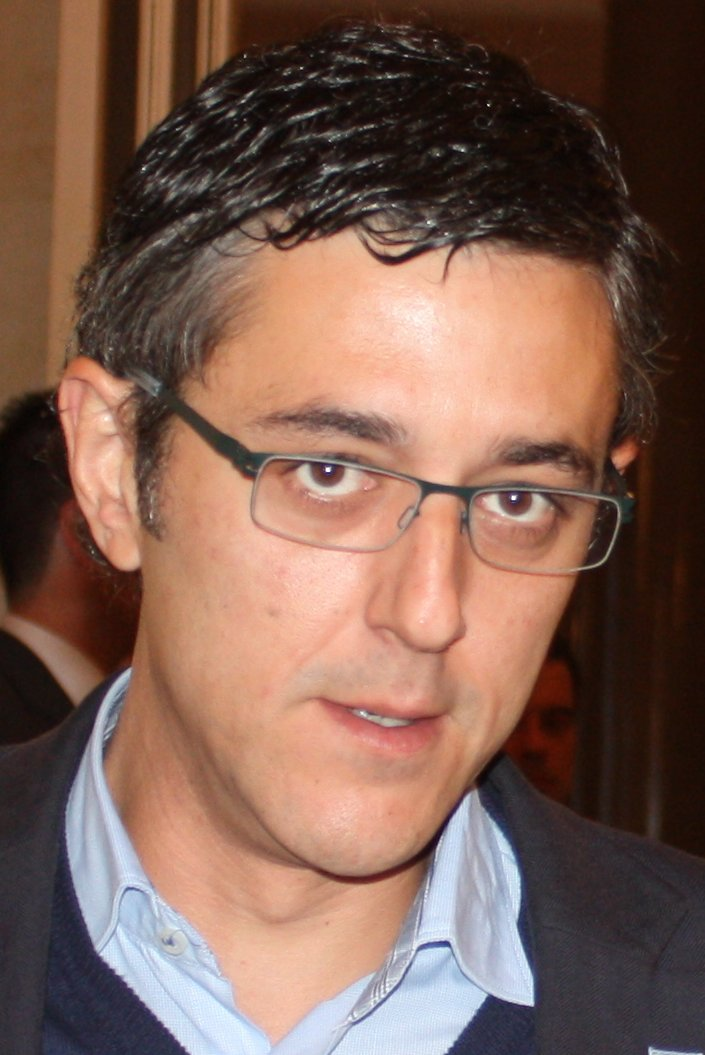
Eduardo Madina

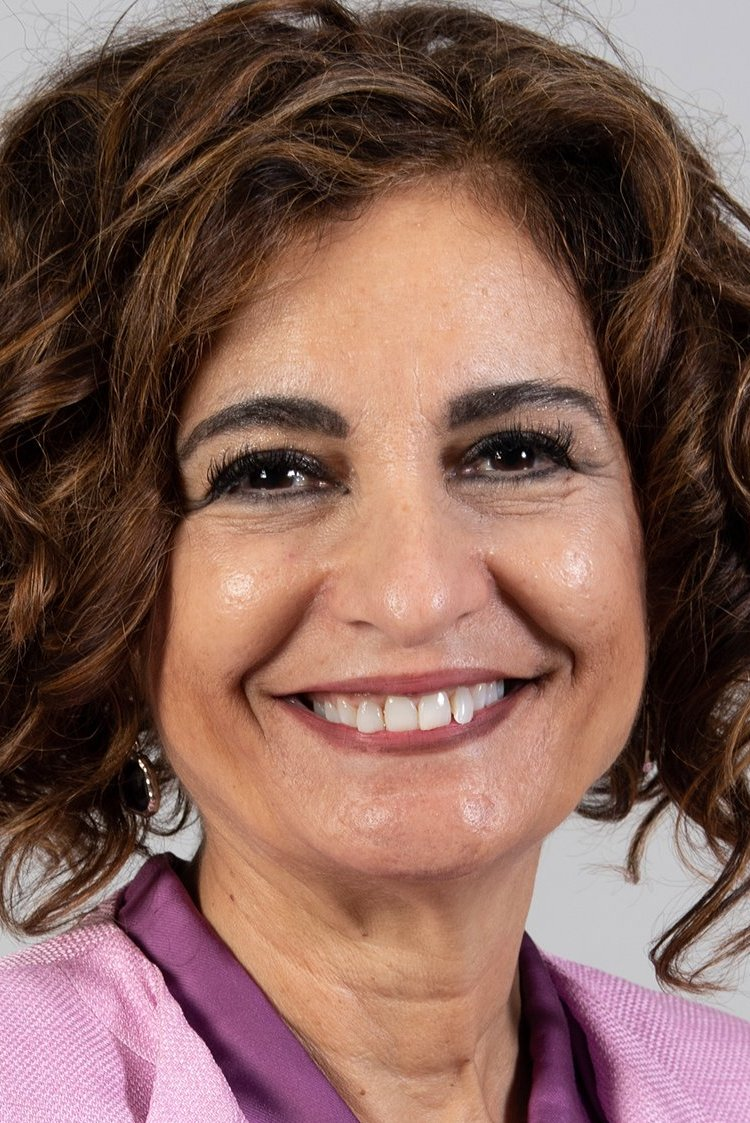
María Jesús Montero

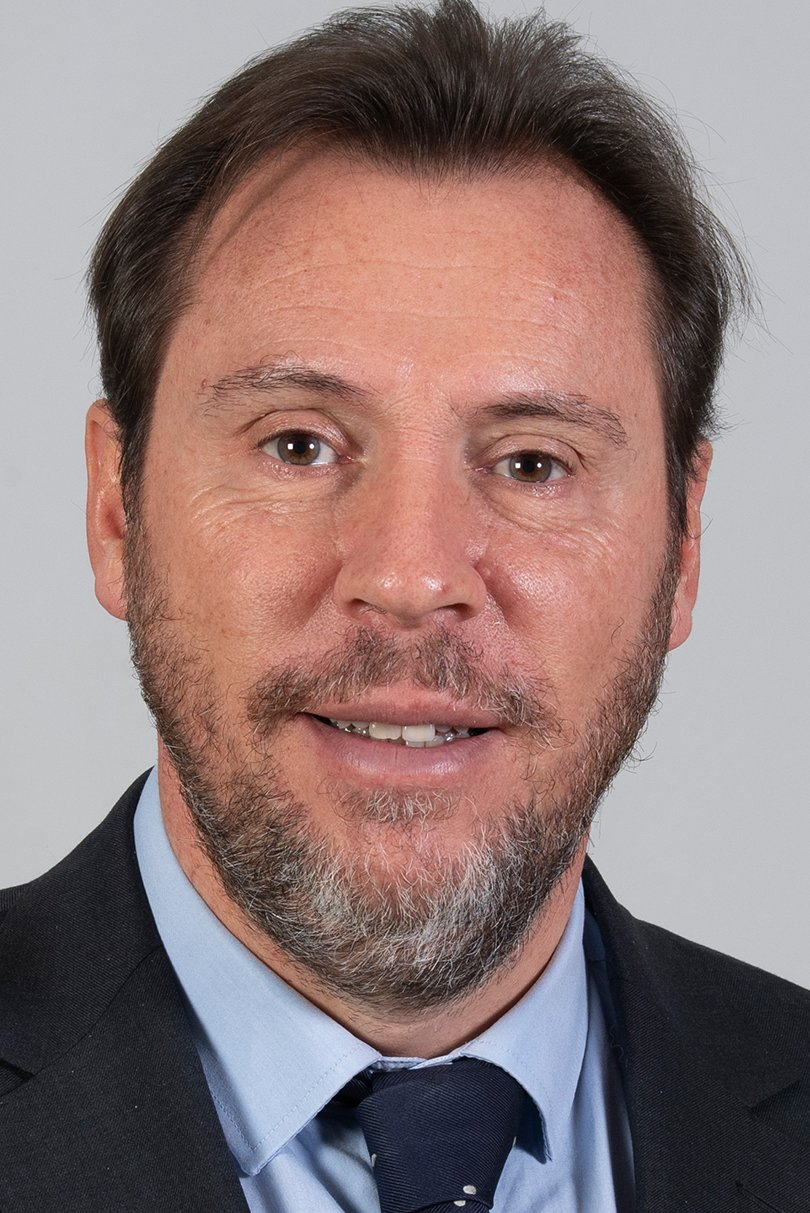
Óscar Puente

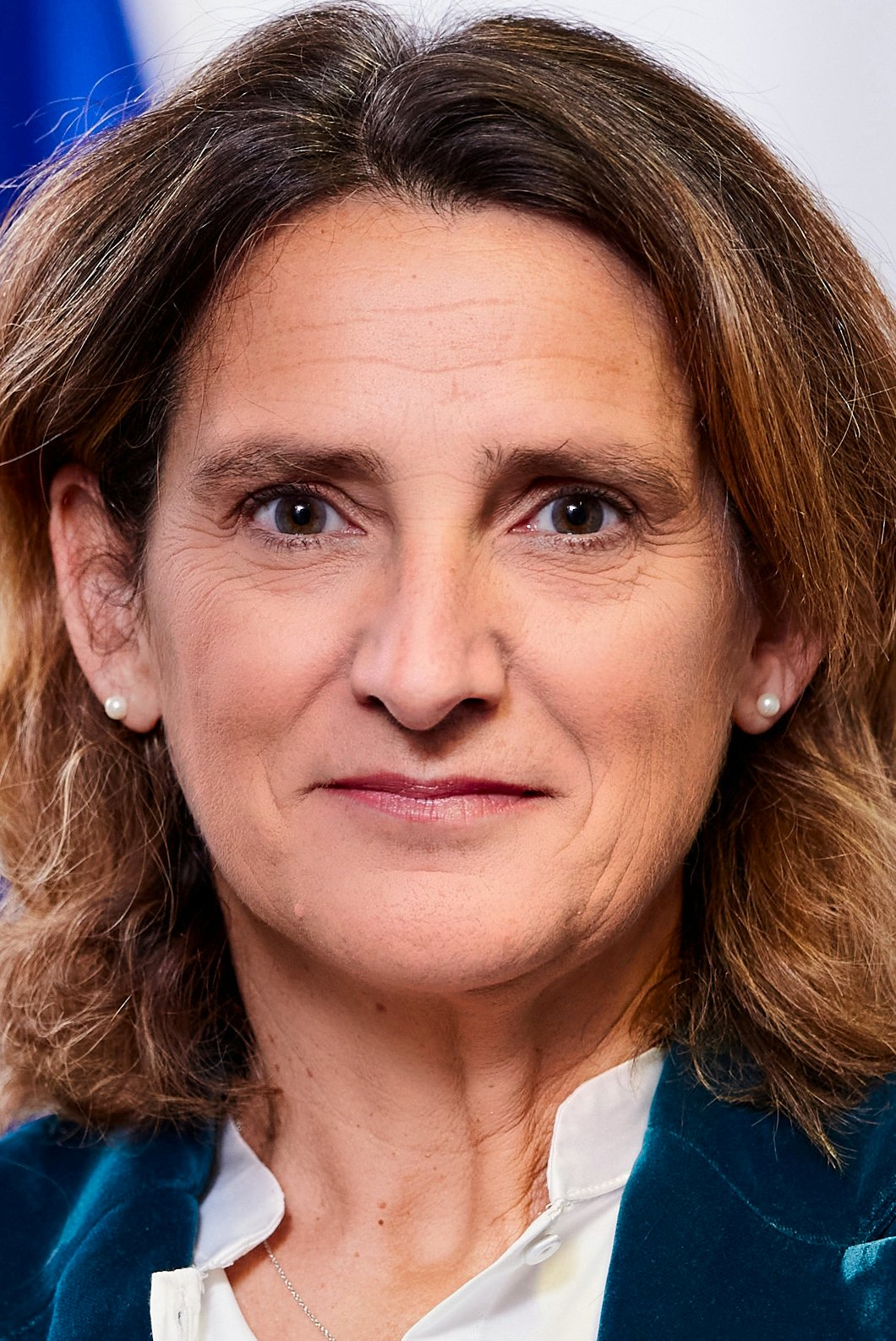
Teresa Ribera
- Pilar Alegría (age 49) — Secretary-General of the PSA–PSOE (since 2025); Minister of Education, Vocational Training and Sports of Spain (2023–2025); Spokesperson of the Government of Spain (2023–2025); Member of the Congress of Deputies for Zaragoza (2008–2015 and 2023); Spokesperson of the PSOE Executive Commission (2022–2024); Minister of Education and Vocational Training of Spain (2021–2023); Delegate of the Government of Spain in Aragon (2020–2021); Spokesperson of the Socialist Group in the City Council of Zaragoza (2019–2020); City Councillor of Zaragoza (2019–2020); Minister of Innovation, Research and University of Aragon (2015–2019); Member of the Cortes of Aragon for Zaragoza (2015–2019); Secretary of Organization of the PSA–PSOE (2014–2017); Member of the PSOE Executive Commission (2008–2012).
- Adrián Barbón (age 47) — President of the Principality of Asturias (since 2019); Member of the General Junta of the Principality of Asturias for the Central District (since 2019); Secretary-General of the FSA–PSOE (since 2017); City Councillor of Laviana (2003–2018); Mayor of Laviana (2008–2017); Member of the Congress of Deputies for Asturias (2015).
- Félix Bolaños (age 48) — Minister of the Presidency, Justice and Relations with the Cortes of Spain (since 2023); Member of the Congress of Deputies for Madrid (since 2023); Secretary of Constitutional Reform and New Rights of the PSOE (since 2021); Minister of the Presidency, Relations with the Cortes and Democratic Memory of Spain (2021–2023); Secretary-General of the Office of the Prime Minister of Spain (2018–2021).
- Josep Borrell (age 79) — High Representative of the Union for Foreign Affairs and Security Policy (2019–2024); Vice-President of the European Commission (2019–2024); Minister of Foreign Affairs, European Union and Cooperation of Spain (2018–2019); Member of the European Parliament for Spain (2004–2009); President of the European Parliament (2004–2007); Member of the Congress of Deputies for Barcelona (1986–2004); Member of the PSOE Executive Commission (1997–2000); Leader of the Opposition of Spain (1998–1999); Spokesperson of the Socialist Group of the Congress (1998–1999); Minister of Public Works, Transport and Environment of Spain (1993–1996); Minister of Public Works and Urbanism of Spain (1991–1993); Secretary of State of Finance of Spain (1984–1991); Secretary-General of Budget and Public Expenditure of Spain (1982–1984); City Councillor of Majadahonda (1979–1983).
- María Chivite (age 48) — President of the Government of Navarre (since 2019); Member of the Parliament of Navarre (2007–2011 and since 2015); Secretary-General of the PSN–PSOE (since 2014); Spokesperson of the Socialist Group in the Parliament of Navarre (2015–2019) Spokesperson of the Socialist Group of the Senate (2014–2015); Senator for Navarre (2011–2015); City Councillor of Valle de Egüés (2011–2013); City Councillor of Cintruénigo (2003–2007).
- Salvador Illa (age 60) — President of the Government of Catalonia (since 2024); First Secretary of the PSC (since 2021); Member of the Parliament of Catalonia for Barcelona (since 2021); Leader of the Opposition of Catalonia (2021–2024); Minister of Health of Spain (2020–2021); Secretary of Organization of the PSC (2016–2021); Director for the Management Service of Barcelona (2010–2011); Director-General for Infrastructure Management of Catalonia (2005–2009); Mayor of La Roca del Vallès (1995–2005); City Councillor of La Roca del Vallès (1987–2005).
- Eduardo Madina (age 50) — Member of the Congress of Deputies for Madrid (2016–2017); Member of the Congress of Deputies for Biscay (2004–2015); Secretary-General of the Socialist Parliamentary Group in the Congress (2009–2014); Member of the PSOE Executive Commission (2008–2014); City Councillor of Sestao (1999–2001).
- María Jesús Montero (age 60) — Member of the Parliament of Andalusia for Seville (2008–2012, 2013–2018 and since 2026); Secretary-General of the PSOE–A (since 2025); Deputy Secretary-General of the PSOE (since 2022); First Deputy Prime Minister of Spain (2023–2026); Minister of Finance of Spain (2018–2021 and 2023–2026); Member of the Congress of Deputies for Seville (2019–2026); Fourth Deputy Prime Minister of Spain (2023); Minister of Finance and Civil Service of Spain (2021–2023); Spokesperson of the Government of Spain (2020–2021); Minister of Finance and Public Administrations of Andalusia (2013–2018); Minister of Health and Social Welfare of Andalusia (2012–2013); Minister of Health and Consumer Affairs of Andalusia (2004–2012).
- Óscar Puente (age 57) — Member of the Congress of Deputies for Valladolid (since 2023); Secretary-General of the PSOE in the province of Valladolid (since 2021); Minister of Transport and Sustainable Mobility of Spain (2023–2026); Mayor of Valladolid (2015–2023); City Councillor of Valladolid (2007–2023); Spokesperson of the PSOE Executive Commission (2017–2021).
- Teresa Ribera (age 57) — First Executive Vice-President for Clean, Just and Competitive Transition of the European Commission (since 2024); European Commissioner for Competition (since 2024); Third Deputy Prime Minister of Spain (2021–2024); Minister for the Ecological Transition and the Demographic Challenge of Spain (2020–2024); Member of the Congress of Deputies for Madrid (2019–2020 and 2023); Fourth Deputy Prime Minister of Spain (2020–2021); Minister for the Ecological Transition of Spain (2018–2020); Secretary of State for Climate Change of Spain (2008–2011); Director-General of the Spanish Office for Climate Change of Spain (2006–2008); Director of the Spanish Office for Climate Change of Spain (2005–2006).

=== Declined ===
The individuals in this section were the subject of speculation about their possible candidacy, but publicly denied or recanted interest in running:

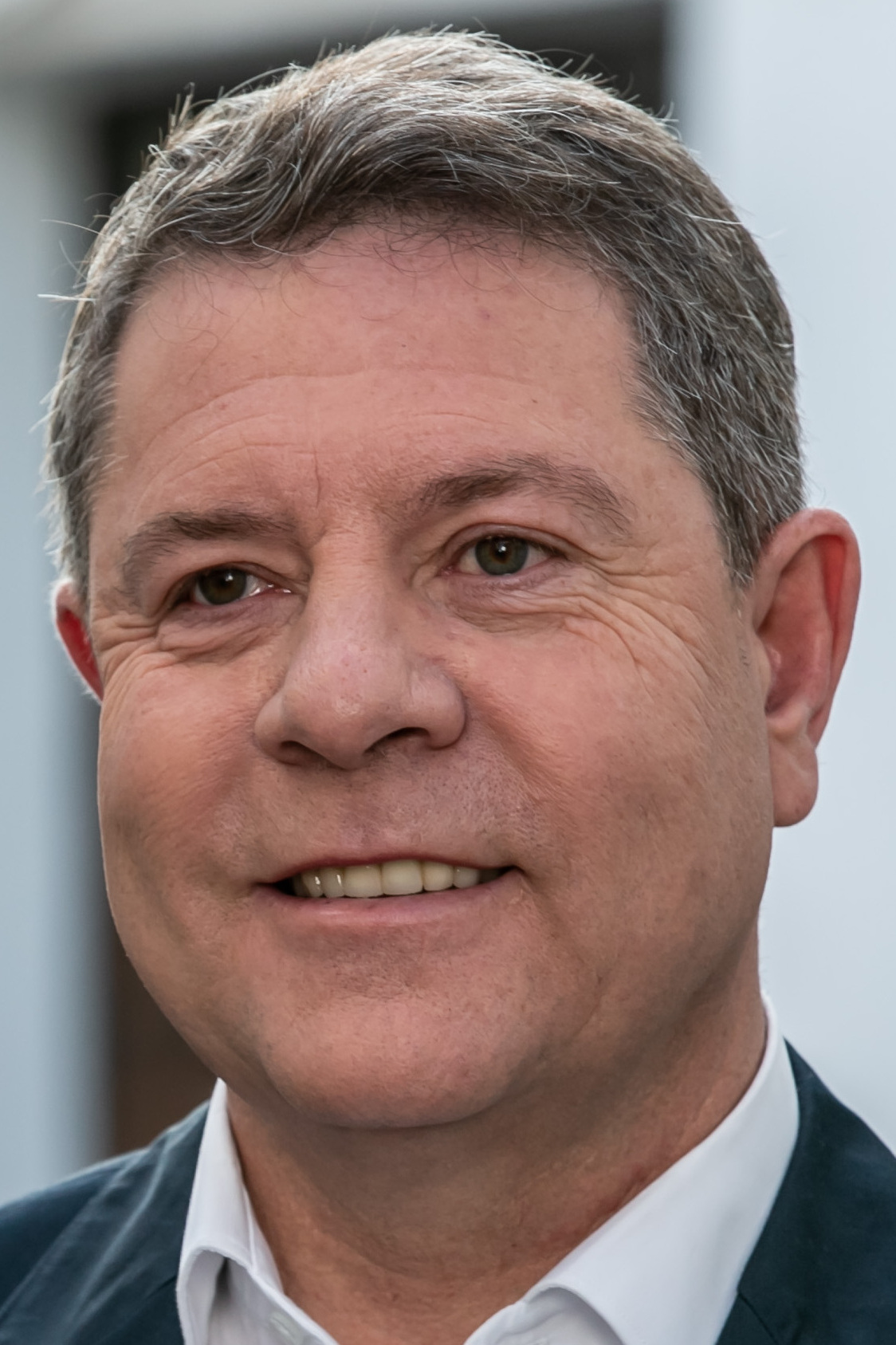
Emiliano García-Page

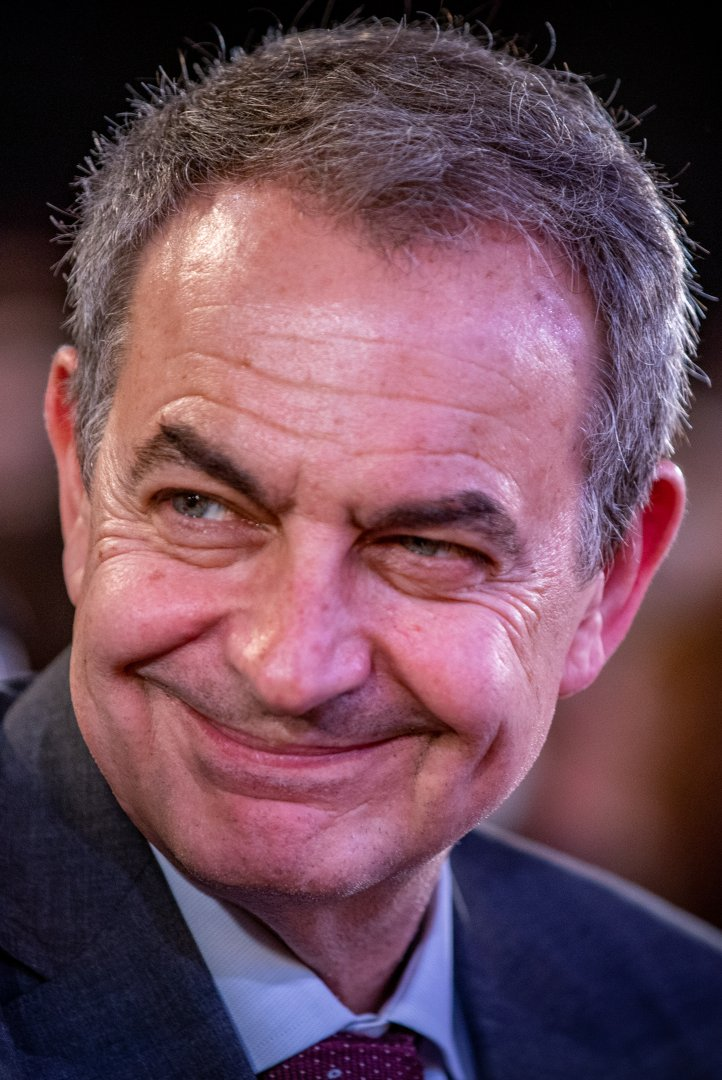
José Luis Rodríguez Zapatero
- Emiliano García-Page (age 58) — President of the Regional Government of Castilla–La Mancha (since 2015); Member of the Cortes of Castilla–La Mancha for Toledo (1995–2007 and since 2015); Member of the PSOE Executive Commission (2012–2016); Senator appointed by the Cortes of Castilla–La Mancha (2011–2015); Mayor of Toledo (2007–2015); City Councillor of Toledo (1987–1993 and 2007–2015); Secretary-General of the PSCM–PSOE in the province of Toledo (1997–2012); Second Vice President of the Regional Government of Castilla–La Mancha (2005–2007); Minister of Institutional Relations of Castilla–La Mancha (2004–2005); Minister-Spokersperson of Castilla–La Mancha (1993–1997, 1998–1999 and 2001–2004); Spokesperson of the Socialist Group in the Cortes of Castilla–La Mancha (2000–2001); Minister of Social Welfare of Castilla–La Mancha (1999–2000); Minister of Public Works of Castilla–La Mancha (1997–1998); Deputy Mayor for Celebrations of Toledo (1991–1993).
- José Luis Rodríguez Zapatero (age 66) — Member of the Council of State (2012–2015); Secretary-General of the PSOE (2000–2012); Prime Minister of Spain (2004–2011); Member of the Congress of Deputies for Madrid (2004–2011); President pro tempore of the Council of the European Union (2010); Leader of the Opposition of Spain (2000–2004); Member of the Congress of Deputies for León (1986–2004); Member of the PSOE Executive Commission (1997–2000); Secretary-General of the PSOE in the province of León (1988–2000).

== Opinion polls ==
Poll results are listed in the tables below in reverse chronological order, showing the most recent first, and using the date the survey's fieldwork was done, as opposed to the date of publication. If such date is unknown, the date of publication is given instead. The highest percentage figure in each polling survey is displayed in bold, and the background shaded in the candidate's colour. In the instance of a tie, the figures with the highest percentages are shaded. Polls show data gathered among PSOE voters/supporters as well as Spanish voters as a whole, but not among party members, who are the ones ultimately entitled to vote in the primary election.

=== PSOE voters ===
Polling firm/Commissioner	Fieldwork date	Sample size											Other /None	Question	Lead
Polling firm/Commissioner	Fieldwork date	Sample size	Sánchez (Inc.)	Bolaños	Cuerpo	Illa	Madina	Montero	Page	Puente	Robles	Zapatero	Other /None	Question	Lead
Sigma Dos/El Mundo	22 Sep–1 Oct 2026	?	–	10.7	4.6	**18.3**	–	–	11.6	15.6	12.1	–	3.3	23.8	2.7
SocioMétrica/El Español	2–4 Sep 2026	?	–	3.5	–	17.8	–	1.9	**28.9**	20.6	–	–	27.3		8.3
DYM/Henneo (Note: PSOE candidate.)	15–20 Jul 2026	?	–	–	11.5	–	7.8	–	**27.3**	13.5	–	–	20.4	19.4	13.8
Opina 360/Antena 3	25–30 Sep 2025	?	–	–	12.1	**37.0**	–	–	7.4	13.3	–	–	17.4	12.8	23.7
SocioMétrica/El Español	21–24 Jul 2025	?	–	4.3	–	–	**24.6**	2.7	–	15.5	9.5	10.0	33.4		9.1
SocioMétrica/El Español	21–24 Jul 2025	?	–	4.4	–	**19.6**	11.5	4.1	13.4	18.6	3.1	8.8	16.5		1.0
EM-Analytics/Electomanía	12–13 Jun 2025	?	**90.6**	–	–	–	–	–	3.9	–	–	–	5.5	–	86.7

=== Spanish voters ===
Polling firm/Commissioner	Fieldwork date	Sample size										Other /None	Question	Lead
Polling firm/Commissioner	Fieldwork date	Sample size	Sánchez (Inc.)	Bolaños	Cuerpo	Illa	Madina	Page	Puente	Robles	Zapatero	Other /None	Question	Lead
Sigma Dos/El Mundo	22 Sep–1 Oct 2026	2,116	–	6.9	2.2	11.0	–	**24.1**	11.1	11.2	–	59.0		12.9
SocioMétrica/El Español	2–4 Sep 2026	1,760	–	–	–	6.6	–	**23.9**	10.5	–	–	59.0		13.4
DYM/Henneo	15–20 Jul 2026	1,014	–	–	6.1	–	7.7	**24.7**	7.0	–	–	29.5	25.0	17.0
Opina 360/Antena 3	25–30 Sep 2025	1,203	–	–	7.4	18.5	–	**24.3**	8.3	–	–	32.8	8.7	5.8
SocioMétrica/El Español	21–24 Jul 2025	1,100	–	–	–	–	**24.6**	–	6.7	8.7	6.5	25.3	28.2	15.9
SocioMétrica/El Español	21–24 Jul 2025	1,100	–	–	–	7.7	10.5	**27.0**	7.1	–	5.6	21.9	20.2	16.5
EM-Analytics/Electomanía	12–13 Jun 2025	1,852	**39.4**	–	–	–	–	27.1	–	–	–	33.5	–	12.3

== Bibliography ==
- Reglamento Federal de desarrollo de los Estatutos Federales (40 Congreso) (PDF) (Party Regulation). Spanish Socialist Workers' Party (in Spanish). 7 January 2022 [version as of 9 October 2023].
- Estatutos Federales (41 Congreso) (PDF) (Party Statutes). Spanish Socialist Workers' Party (in Spanish). 1 December 2024.
