= Isabel Rodríguez García =

Spanish politician (born 1981)

The Most Excellent Isabel Rodríguez
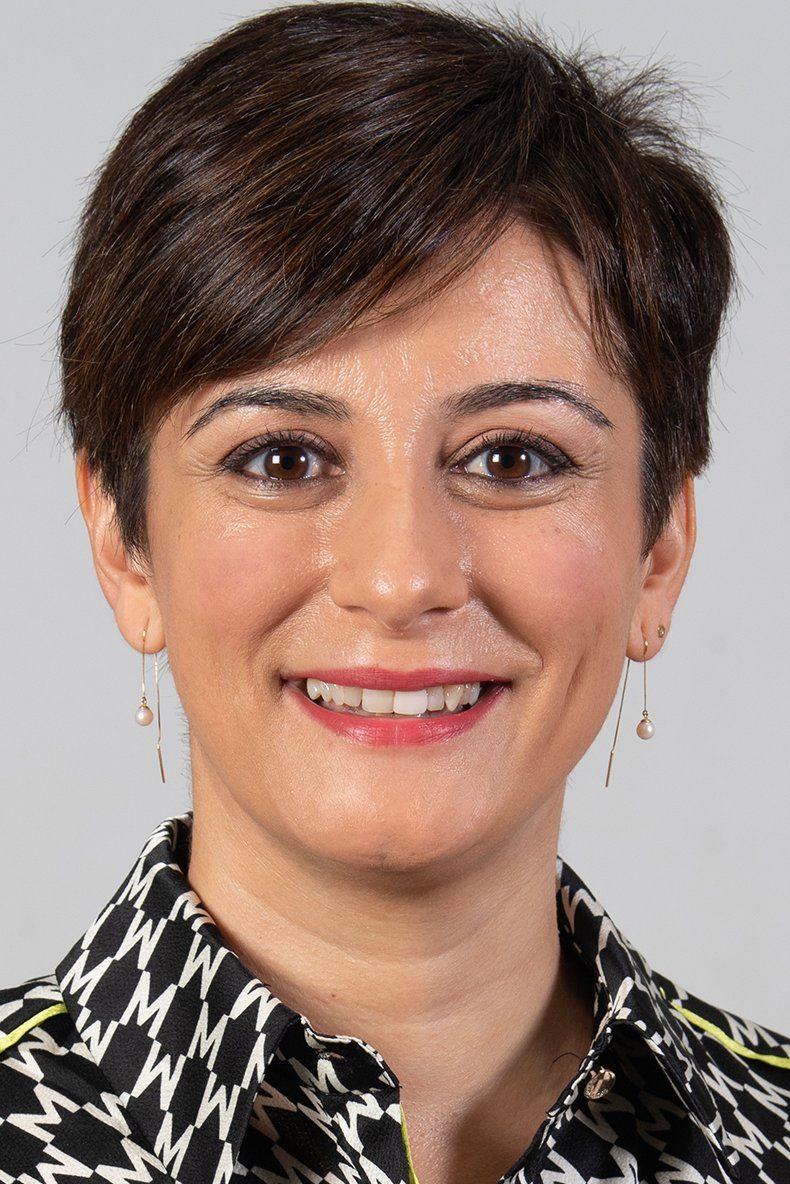
- Official portrait, 2023

Minister of Housing and Urban Agenda of Spain
- Incumbent
- Assumed office 21 November 2023
- Prime Minister: Pedro Sánchez
- Preceded by: Office reestablished (Previously: Beatriz Corredor)

Minister of Territorial Policy of Spain
- In office 12 July 2021 – 21 November 2023
- Prime Minister: Pedro Sánchez
- Preceded by: Miquel Iceta (Territorial Policy and Civil Service)
- Succeeded by: Ángel Víctor Torres (Territorial Policy and Democratic Memory)

Spokesperson of the Government of Spain
- In office 12 July 2021 – 21 November 2023
- Prime Minister: Pedro Sánchez
- Preceded by: María Jesús Montero
- Succeeded by: Pilar Alegría

Mayor of Puertollano
- In office 15 June 2019 – 11 July 2021
- Preceded by: Mayte Fernandez
- Succeeded by: Adolfo Muniz

Member of the Congress of Deputies
- In office 13 December 2011 – 21 May 2019
- Constituency: Ciudad Real
- In office 17 August 2023 – 6 December 2023
- Succeeded by: Cristina López Zamora
- Constituency: Ciudad Real

Member of the Senate
- In office 14 March 2004 – 17 July 2007
- Constituency: Ciudad Real

Personal details
- Born: 5 June 1981 (age 45) Abenójar, Spain
- Party: Spanish Socialist Workers' Party]

Isabel Rodríguez García (pronounced [isaˈβel roˈðɾiɣeθ ɣaɾˈθi.a]; born 1981) is a Spanish politician of the Spanish Socialist Workers' Party (PSOE), serving as minister of Housing and Urban Agenda since 2023.

Before this, Rodríguez has served as minister for Territorial Policy and spokesperson of the Government from 2021 to 2023, and before as mayor of Puertollano from 2019 to 2021. She has been a member of the Senate (2003–2007) and the Congress of Deputies (2011–2019; 2023).

== Biography ==
Born on 5 June 1981 in Abenójar (province of Ciudad Real), she became a member of the Socialist Youth when she was 15 years old. She earned a licentiate degree in Law from the University of Castile-La Mancha. Elected as senator at the 2004 Spanish general election in representation of Ciudad Real after commanding 139,873 votes, she became the youngest female member of the Upper House ever. In 2007, Rodríguez was appointed as Director General of Youth of the Regional Government of Castilla–La Mancha, and in 2008, as Spokesperson of the Regional Government.

She stood as candidate to the Congress of Deputies in the 2011 general election, running second in the PSOE list in Ciudad Real. Elected as member of the 10th term of the Congress of Deputies, she renovated her seat at the 2015 and 2016 general elections.

Designated as PSOE's head of list and prospective mayoral candidate vis-à-vis the 2019 Puertollano municipal election in 2019, the PSOE list earned 10 councillors out of a total 21, and she was invested mayor of the municipality on 16 June 2019 with a plurality of votes of the new municipal council, retaining control of what it was a stronghold for the PSOE since the advent of democracy at the 1979 municipal election.

On mid-2021, Rodríguez left the mayorship of Puertollano to join the second government of Pedro Sánchez as minister for Territorial Policy and spokesperson. Two years later, in November 2023, she was appointed minister of Housing and Urban Agenda in the third government of Pedro Sánchez.
