= Eugenia Gómez de Diego =

Spanish politician (born 1976)

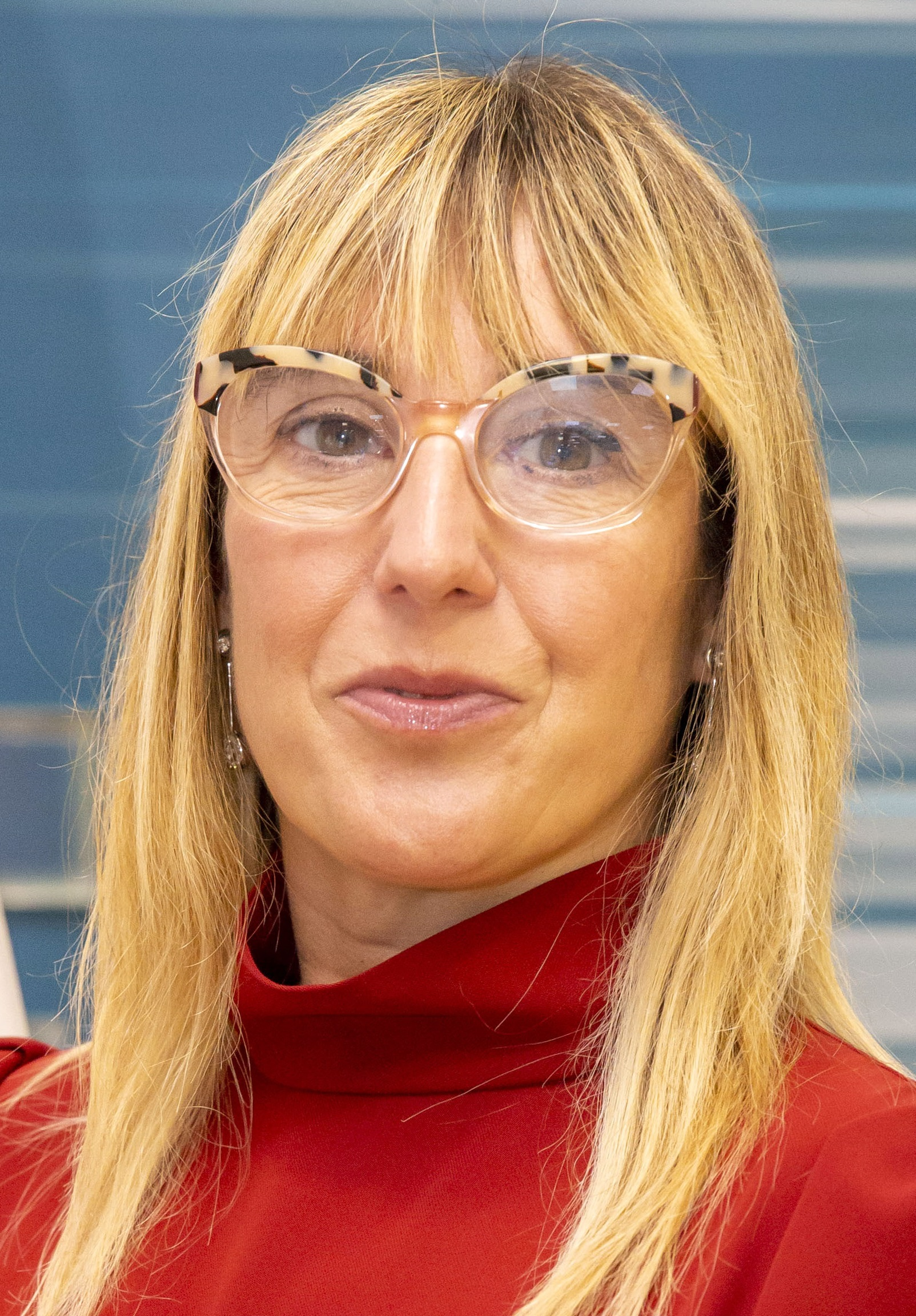
- Gómez de Diego in 2022

Minister of Employment and Social Affairs of Cantabria
- In office 12 April 2022 – 7 July 2023
- President: Miguel Ángel Revilla
- Preceded by: Ana Belén Álvarez
- Succeeded by: Position abolished

Personal details
- Born: 1976 (age 49–50)
- Party: Spanish Socialist Workers' Party

Eugenia Gómez de Diego (born 1976) is a Spanish politician. From 2023 to 2025, she served as government delegate in Cantabria. From 2022 to 2023, she served as minister of employment and social affairs of Cantabria.
