= Francisco Martín Aguirre =

Spanish politician (born 1981)

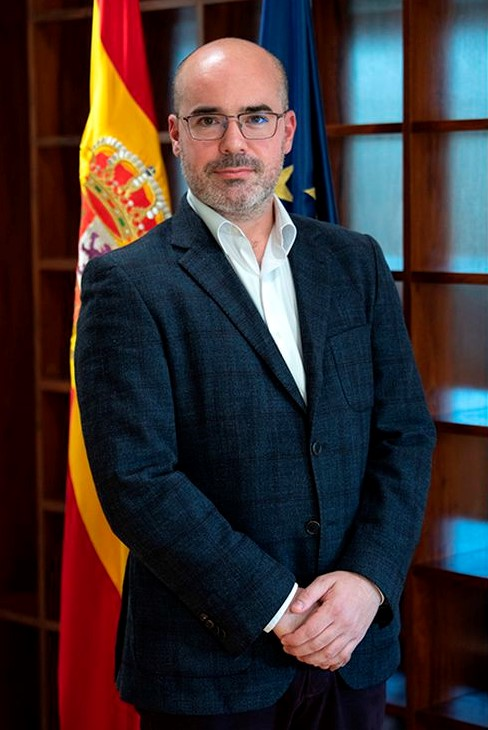
- Martín in 2021

Government Delegate in the Community of Madrid
- In office 28 March 2023 – 28 October 2026
- Monarch: Felipe VI
- Prime Minister: Pedro Sánchez
- Preceded by: Mercedes González Fernández
- Succeeded by: Pilar Trinidad Núñez

Personal details
- Born: 19 September 1981 (age 45)
- Party: Spanish Socialist Workers' Party (since 2000)

Francisco Martín Aguirre (born 19 September 1981) is a Spanish politician serving as delegate of the government of Spain in the Community of Madrid since 2023. From 2021 to 2023, he served as secretary general of the Office of the Prime Minister.
