= Abenójar, Ciudad Real =

Coordinates: 38°53′N 4°21′W

Abenójar, Ciudad Real Abenójar
- Municipality
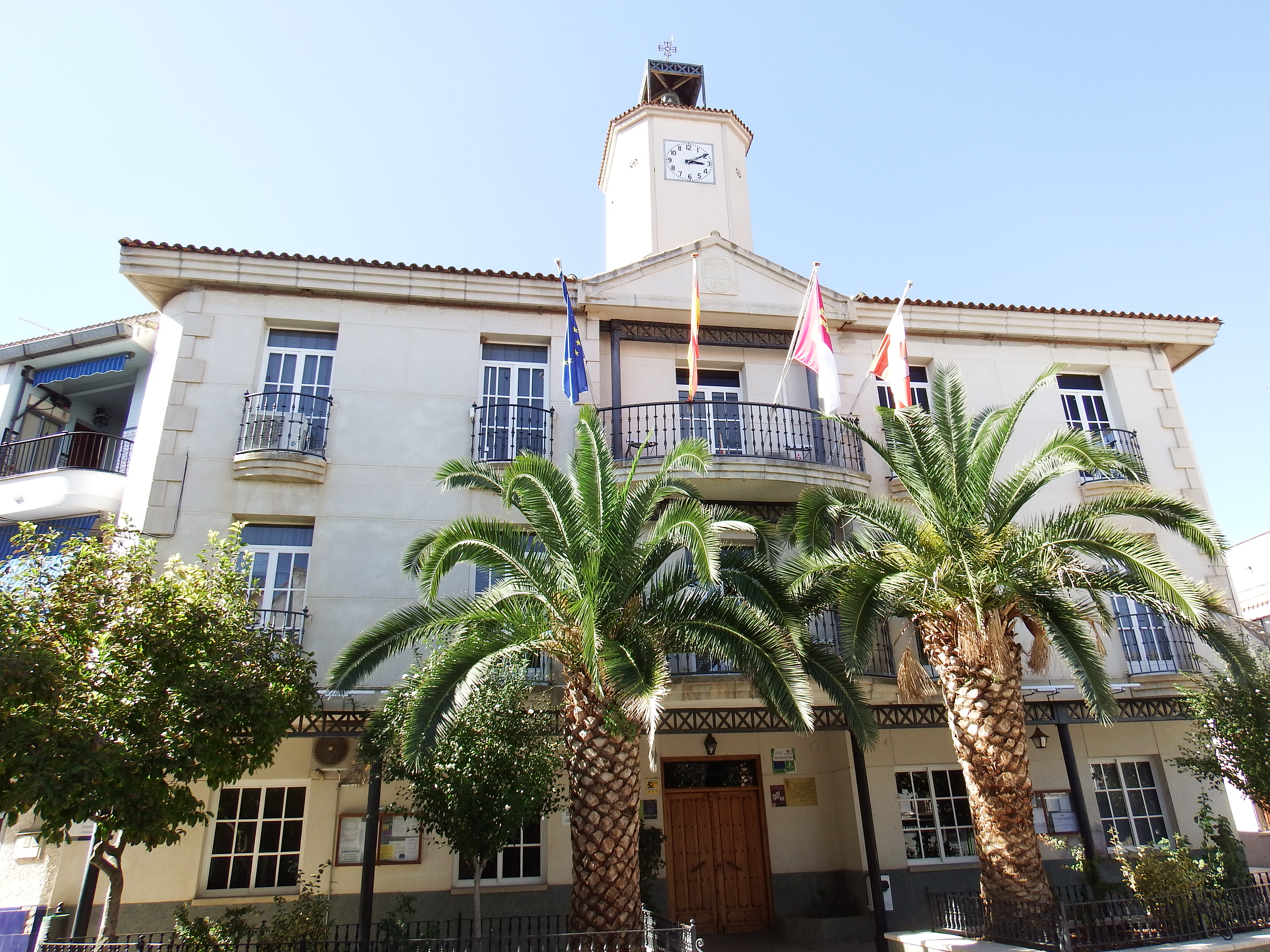
- Town hall

- Coat of arms
- Interactive map of Abenójar, Ciudad Real
- Country: Spain

Government
  - Mayoress: Verónica García Sánchez (PP)
- Elevation: 612 m (2,008 ft)

Abenójar is a municipality in Ciudad Real Province, Castile-La Mancha, Spain. It has a population of 1,314 inhabitants as of 2022 and spans across an area of 42,368 hectares.

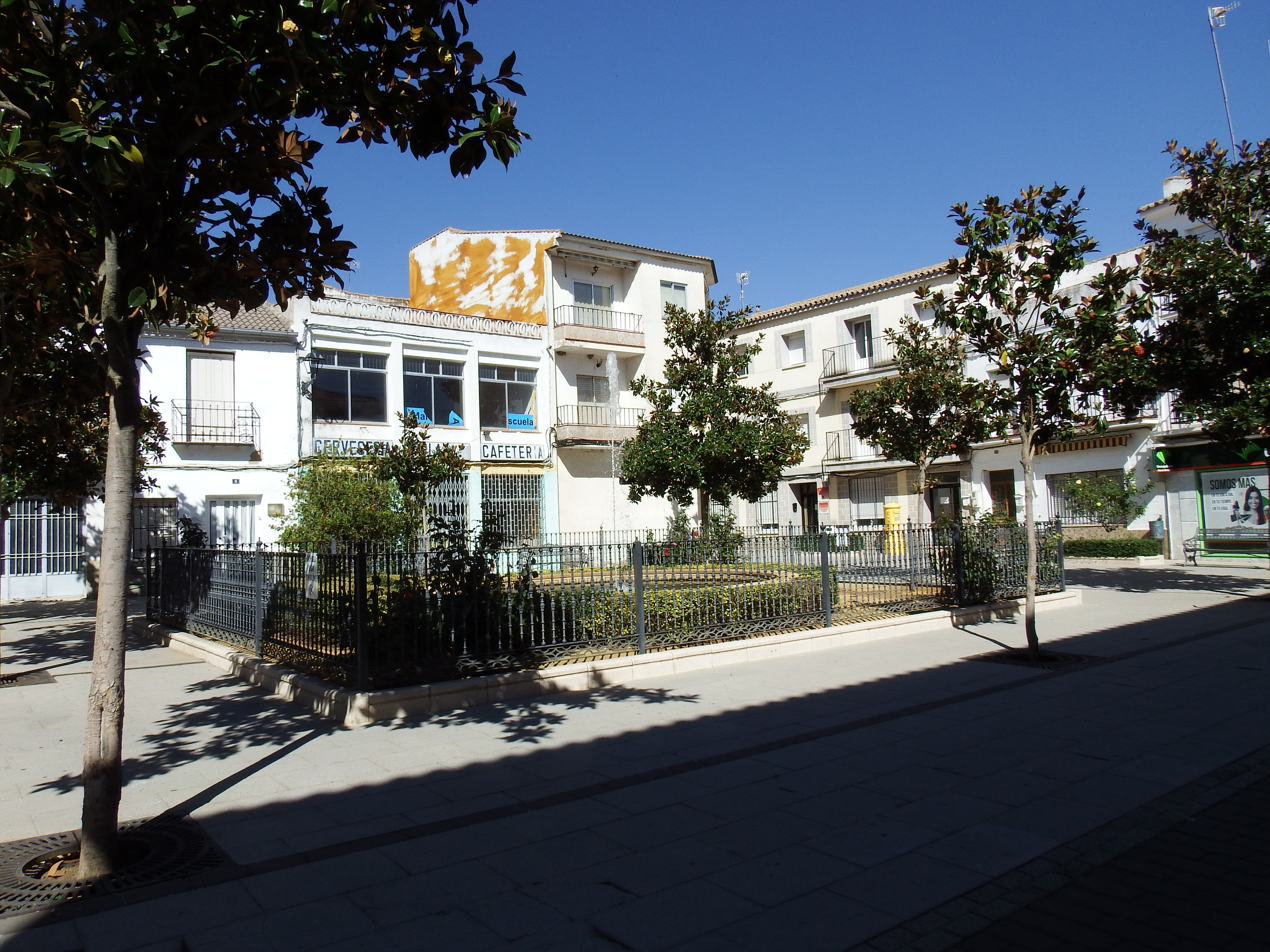
Plaza de la Constitución (Constitution Square), Abenójar
