= Félix Bolaños =

Spanish politician and lawyer (born 1975)

The Most Excellent Félix Bolaños MP
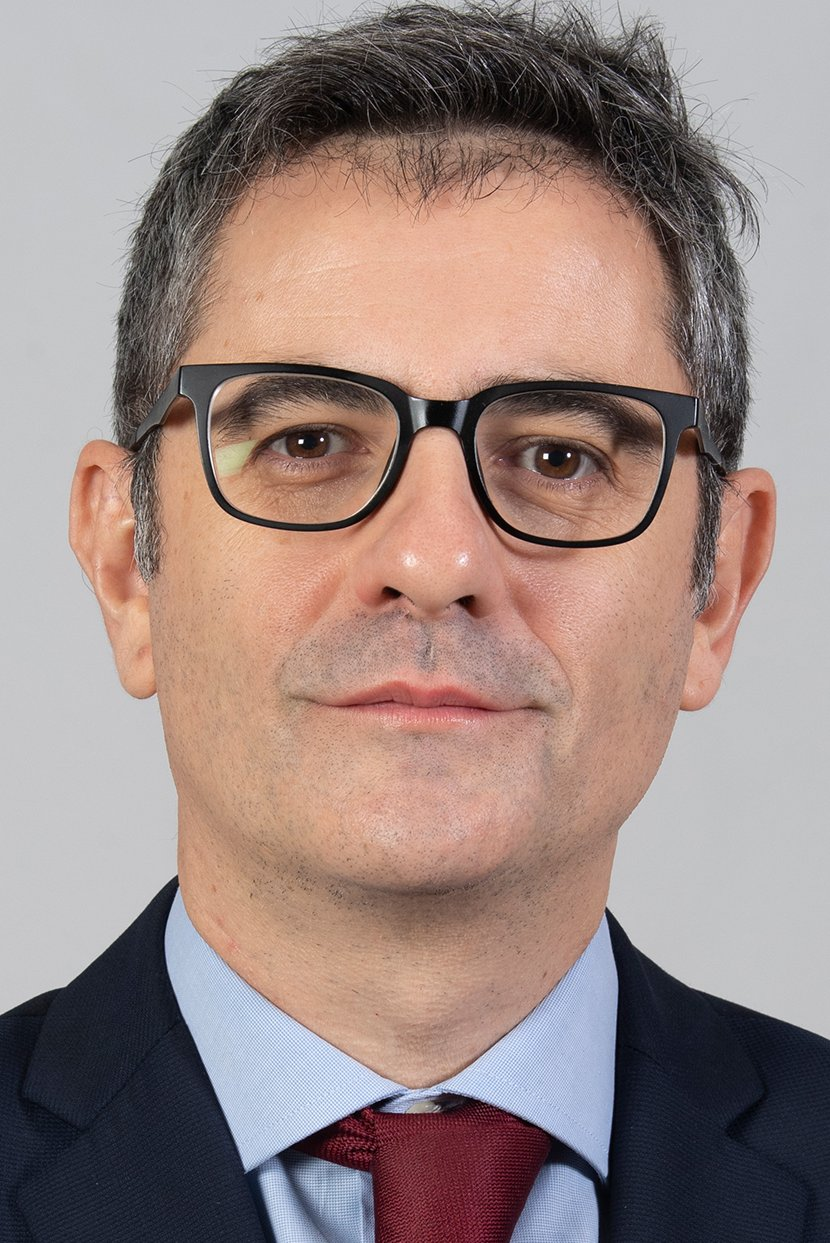
- Official portrait, 2023

Minister of the Presidency, Justice and Relations with the Cortes First Notary of the Kingdom Secretary of the Council of Ministers
- Incumbent
- Assumed office 21 November 2023
- Prime Minister: Pedro Sánchez
- Preceded by: Pilar Llop (Justice); Himself (Presidency, Relations with the Cortes and Democratic Memory)

Minister of the Presidency, Relations with the Cortes and Democratic Memory Secretary of the Council of Ministers
- In office 12 July 2021 – 21 November 2023
- Prime Minister: Pedro Sánchez
- Preceded by: Carmen Calvo
- Succeeded by: Himself (Presidency, Justice and Relations with the Cortes)

Secretary-General of the Office of the Prime Minister of Spain
- In office 9 June 2018 – 12 July 2021
- Prime Minister: Pedro Sánchez
- Preceded by: José Luis Ayllón
- Succeeded by: Francisco Martín Aguirre

Member of the Congress of Deputies
- Incumbent
- Assumed office 17 August 2023
- Constituency: Madrid

Personal details
- Born: 17 December 1975 (age 50) Madrid, Spain
- Party: PSOE
- Education: Complutense University of Madrid

Félix Bolaños García (pronounced [ˈfeliɣs βoˈlaɲos]; Madrid, 17 December 1975) is a Spanish lawyer and politician who serves as minister of the Presidency, Justice and Relations with the Cortes since 2023. Previously, he served as Secretary-General of the Office of the Prime Minister of Spain from 2018 to 2021, and as minister of the Presidency, Relations with the Cortes and Democratic Memory from 2021 to 2023.

== Biography ==
Bolaños was born in the city of Madrid in 1975.

=== Studies and career ===
He graduated in law by the Complutense University of Madrid (UCM), being the first of his promotion in both the preparatory grade to be a lawyer and the special grade in labour law of the School of Legal Practice of the UCM. He began to practice law In 1998 and in 2001 he started working as a lawyer in the labour department at the Uría Menéndez Law Firm.

In May 2005, he joined the Bank of Spain, obtaining the only summoned position of legal counsel in labour, union and Social Security matters. Between October 2008 and June 2018, he served as head of the Labour Legal Advice and Legal Documentation division of the Bank of Spain.

He was a teacher at the Instituto de Empresa (IE Law School).

=== Political career ===
Bolaños is a member of the Spanish Socialist Workers' Party (PSOE), and from 2008 to 2017, he was member of the PSOE Regional Committee of Madrid.

In the 2014 PSOE Extraordinary Congress, Bolaños was elected secretary of the Ethics and Guarantee Federal Commission, and he was re-elected in the 39th PSOE Federal Congress in June 2017. That year, he was appointed by the party's Federal Executive Committee as the coordinator of the work group that wrote the new internal rules of the PSOE, which were approved by the Federal Committee on 17 February 2018.

From September 2017 to August 2018, he was secretary of the Pablo Iglesias Foundation. After his departure from the secretariat of the foundation, he remains a patron.

In June 2018, he was appointed Secretary-General of the Spanish Prime Minister Office, a position in which he was ratified by the Prime Minister, Pedro Sánchez, in January 2020, at the beginning of his second term as head of government.

Along with Deputy Prime Minister Carmen Calvo and Justice Minister Dolores Delgado, Bolaños was responsible for the coordination of the process for the exhumation, transfer, and reinhumation of the remains of dictator Francisco Franco which took place on 24 October 2019. He was the main interlocutor between the Government and the Franco family.

He was entrusted by the Prime Minister to prepare the structures of the government departments of the coalition Government with Unidas Podemos in 2020. He continued his supportive role to the Prime Minister by taking part in the conversations between the Government and the opposition to renew strategic State bodies, and to approve the state of emergency due to the COVID-19 pandemic. He also collaborated in the writing of the pardons to the nine jailed Catalan separatists leaders.

In July 2021, Prime Minister Pedro Sánchez announced his appointment as Minister of Presidency, Relations with the Cortes and Democratic Memory, and, as such, Secretary of the Council of Ministers.

==== Government minister ====
In July 2021, the Prime Minister carried out a government reshuffle, and Bolaños was appointed as head of the Ministry of the Presidency, Relations with the Cortes and Democratic Memory, replacing Deputy Prime Minister Carmen Calvo. Also, as such, he became Secretary of the Council of Ministers.

He was elected to the 15th Congress of Deputies in the 2023 Spanish general election from Madrid.
