= Ministry of the Presidency, Justice and Relations with the Cortes =

Government ministry of Spain

- Ministerio de la Presidencia, Justicia y Relaciones con las Cortes

Agency overview
- Formed: 21 November 2023
- Preceding agencies: Ministry of Justice; Ministry of the Presidency and Relations with the Cortes
- Type: Ministry
- Jurisdiction: Government of Spain
- Annual budget: €2,73 billion, 2026
- Minister responsible: Félix Bolaños, Minister
- Website: https://www.mpr.gob.es/Paginas/index.aspx

The Ministry of the Presidency, Justice and Relations with the Cortes is a department in the Government of Spain responsible for providing political and administrative support to the Prime Minister and his staff, to the Royal Household, as well as managing the relations between the Government and the Cortes Generales (Parliament). Likewise, it is also responsible for coordinating constitutional affairs and for designing, implementing and monitoring the government's legislative program.

Furthermore, the department is responsible for the government policy on justice, legal system development and freedom of religion. In this sense, it manages relations with the General Council of the Judiciary and the rest of the Administration of Justice, the Prosecution Ministry and the Catholic Church, and is in charge of international legal cooperation.

Sometimes described as a "superministry", it was established in November 2023 by prime minister Pedro Sánchez as a result of the merger of two previous ministries: the Ministry of Justice and the Ministry of the Presidency.

== Organization ==
Organizational chart, February 2024

The Minister of the Presidency, Justice and Relations with the Cortes is the most senior official of the department. The minister sets the general policy and is assisted by two secretaries of state, one for justice affairs and other for parliamentary matters.

The Ministry also has an under-secretary for the day-to-day management of the department and the Solicitor General, with the rank of under-secretary, who directs the State's legal servicies.

The Ministry is organised as follows:

Ministry Organization (2025)
Minister	Cabinet (Chief of Staff)
Minister	Centre for Political and Constitutional Studies
Minister	Centre for Sociological Research
Minister	Patrimonio Nacional
Secretary of State for Justice	General Secretariat for Innovation and Quality in the Public Justice Service
Secretary of State for Justice	Directorate-General for Efficiency in the Public Justice Service
Secretary of State for Justice	Directorate-General for Digital Transformation of the Administration of Justice
Secretary of State for Justice	Directorate-General for Legal Certainty and Public Attestation
Secretary of State for Justice	Deputy Directorate-General for Innovation and Quality in the Judicial and Prosecutorial Services
Secretary of State for Justice	Directorate-General for International Legal Cooperation
Secretary of State for Justice	Centre for Legal Studies
Secretary of State for Justice	General Mutual Benefit Society for the Personnel of the Administration of Justice
Secretary of State for Relations with the Cortes and Constitutional Affairs	Directorate-General for Relations with the Cortes
Secretary of State for Relations with the Cortes and Constitutional Affairs	Directorate-General for Constitutional Affairs and Legal Coordination
Under-Secretary	Technical General Secretariat–Government Secretariat
Under-Secretary	Directorate-General for Services
Under-Secretary	Directorate-General for Religious Freedom
Under-Secretary	Official State Gazette
Solicitor General of the State	Directorate-General for Advisory Services
Solicitor General of the State	Directorate-General for Litigation
Solicitor General of the State	Deputy Directorate-General for Human and Material Resources
Solicitor General of the State	Deputy Directorate-General for Constitutional Affairs and Human Rights
Solicitor General of the State	Deputy Directorate-General for European Union and International Affairs
Solicitor General of the State	Deputy Directorate-General for Internal Audit and Knowledge Management
Solicitor General of the State	Regional Offices of the Solicitor General's Office

The Spanish Data Protection Agency (AEPD) and the Independent Whistleblower Protection Authority (AIPI) are linked to the Government through this department.

== Budget ==
In millions of euros (€)
1. Justice 2,366.3 (86.6%)
2. Administrative and institutional support 319.2 (11.7%)
3. Relations with Parliament 48.3 (1.77%)

For fiscal year 2023, extended to 2026, the Ministry of the Presidency, Justice and Relations with the Cortes has a consolidated budget of €2.73 billion. Of this amount, €2.36 billion are directly managed by the ministry's central services while €369 million are managed by its agencies.

The budget can be divided into three main areas:

1. Justice (Programs 111N, 111Q, 111R, 111S, 112A, 113M, 135M, 222M, 312E, 42KD & 921S), which covers funding for the Administration of Justice, personnel and social protection, data protection and State legal services, among others.
2. Relations with Parliament (912O), covering the relationship between the executive and legislative branches.
3. Administrative and institutional support (337A, 337D, 462M, 467G, 911Q, 912M, 921Q & 921R), which includes administrative and institutional support for the Government, the Prime Minister's Office and the Royal Household, as well as finances some cross-cutting services.

In addition, Programme 000X (“Internal Transfers and Disbursements”) is excluded from the analysis, as it consists of transfers between public sector entities and would otherwise lead to double counting and distort the overall budget.

=== Audit ===
The Ministry's accounts, as well as those of its agencies, are internally audited by the Office of the Comptroller General of the State (IGAE), through a Delegated Comptroller's Office within the Department itself. Externally, the Court of Auditors is responsible for auditing expenditures.

The Ministry's accounts are also subject to scrutiny by the relevant committees of the Congress of Deputies and the Senate.

== List of officeholders ==
Office name:

- Ministry of the Presidency, Justice and Relations with the Cortes (2023–present)

Portrait	Name (Birth–Death)	Term of office			Party	Government	Prime Minister (Tenure)	Ref.
Portrait	Name (Birth–Death)	Took office	Left office	Duration	Party	Government	Prime Minister (Tenure)	Ref.
	Félix Bolaños (born 1975)	21 November 2023	Incumbent	2 years and 302 days	PSOE	Sánchez III	Pedro Sánchez (2018–present)	
