= 2017 PSOE federal party congress =

- 21 May 2017 (primary); 16−18 June 2017 (congress)

988 delegates in the Federal Congress Plurality of delegates needed to win
- Opinion polls
- Registered: Primary: 187,949
- Turnout: Primary: 149,951 (79.8%); Congress: 956 (96.8%)
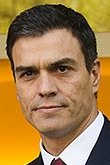

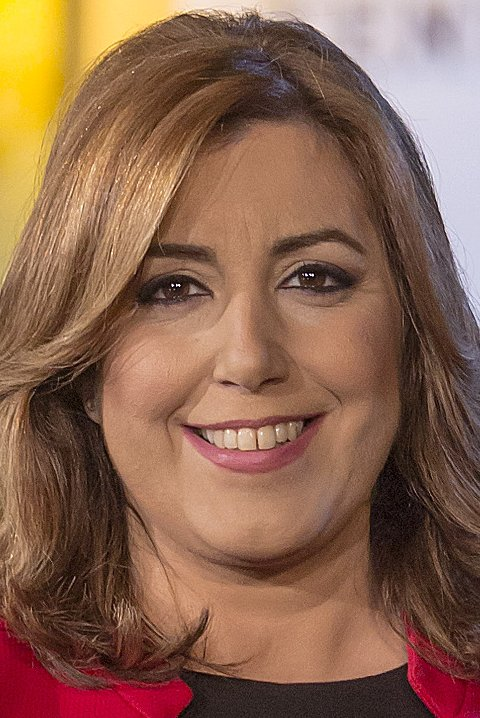

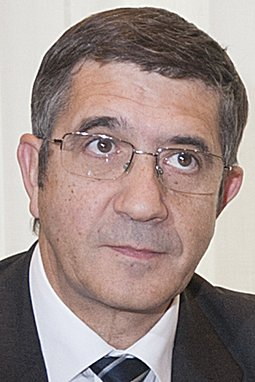
Candidate	Pedro Sánchez	Susana Díaz	Patxi López
Popular vote	74,805 (49.9%)	59,392 (39.6%)	14,652 (9.8%)
Delegate vote	Unopposed	Withdrew	Withdrew
Executive	674 (71.1%)	Withdrew	Withdrew
Party leader before election
Caretaker commission headed by Javier Fernández
Party leader after election
Pedro Sánchez

The Spanish Socialist Workers' Party (PSOE) held its 39th federal congress in Madrid between 16 and 18 June 2017, to renovate its governing bodies—including the post of secretary-general, which amounted to that of party leader—and establish the party platform and policy until the next congress, after the sacking of Pedro Sánchez as party leader in October 2016 had resulted in a caretaker leadership being appointed. The primary election was held on 21 May 2017, after being confirmed in a federal committee on 1 April.

The leadership race was the first to be held after the party's electoral setbacks in both the 2015 and 2016 general elections in which the party scored its two worst electoral records since the Spanish transition to democracy. An extraordinary party congress had been held in July 2014 after Alfredo Pérez Rubalcaba's resignation, in which Pedro Sánchez had been elected as new party leader. However, no ordinary congress had been held since 2012. Former President of the Congress of Deputies and former Lehendakari Patxi López publicly announced his bid as candidate on 15 January, with President of the Regional Government of Andalusia Susana Díaz and Sánchez himself following suit.

The election resulted in Pedro Sánchez being re-elected as Secretary-General in a landslide. Sánchez would ultimately lead the PSOE into government after a successful vote of no confidence which would see Prime Minister Mariano Rajoy and his People's Party ousted from power.

== Background ==
=== Susana Díaz's rise ===
Susana Díaz became President of the Regional Government of Andalusia and Secretary-General of the PSOE–A succeeding José Antonio Griñán—who had resigned as a result of political fallout derived from the ERE scandal—after a rapid ascent among party ranks throughout the previous years. Known for her political ambition, her power and influence grew as she became the leader of the most powerful Spanish Socialist Workers' Party regional federation, as well as premier of the largest and most populous region in Spain. Soon, she was publicly acclaimed by party colleagues who considered she had the skills, charisma and political appeal needed for leading the PSOE, and they quickly rallied behind her as a potential contender for the role of Secretary-General after Alfredo Pérez Rubalcaba's announced resignation—as a consequence of the PSOE electoral setback in the 2014 European Parliament election—ushered in a rushed leadership race. However, the challenge posed by Eduardo Madina—whose pressure forced a primary election to be held on 13 July—, Díaz's own desire to become party leader by acclamation and not through a bitter leadership contest which could see her popularity eroded, as well as opposition from within the PSOE–A—members of which asked her to remain in Andalusia—motivated Diaz's decision not to run. Nonetheless, Díaz's opposition to Madina for his maneuvers to trigger a party primary and, consequently, thwarting her planned rise, resulted in the PSOE–A backing a dark horse candidate, then-relatively unknown deputy Pedro Sánchez, ahead of the previous federal congress. Thanks to Díaz's support, Sánchez was able to win the primary election by a wide margin and become the new PSOE Secretary-General.

However, the alliance between Sánchez and Díaz was short-lived. Díaz's initial plans to become the PSOE candidate at the next general election were impeded by Sánchez's own growing political aspirations. This, coupled with personal differences derived from Sánchez's management over the party, seen as alienating the different party families, caused both leaders to grow increasingly distrustful of each other and to develop a personal rivalry. Susana Díaz took advantage of growing criticism to Sánchez's leadership, succeeding in causing many long-standing rivals within the party—such as Rubalcaba and Carme Chacón, Felipe González and José Luis Rodríguez Zapatero, or even Eduardo Madina and Díaz herself; as well as six out of the seven PSOE regional presidents—to abandon their feuds, attracting them to her sphere and uniting them against her former protégé.

=== 2016 PSOE crisis ===
The 2015 general election had seen the PSOE obtaining its worst results in a general election since the Spanish transition to democracy, with the party reduced to just 90 seats and 5.5 million votes. Left-wing newcomer Podemos had finished within striking distance, winning 69 seats and 5.2 million votes, boosted by massive support from young voters, raising fears among some PSOE leaders that Podemos could eventually replace their party as the dominant Spanish party to the left-of-centre. Secretary-General Pedro Sánchez, who had led the party into the general election and whose leadership had been widely questioned for some time by the critical faction led by Susana Díaz, announced he would run for re-election as party leader in the party federal congress initially scheduled for early 2016. Díaz, unlike 2014, was now allegedly determined to become new party leader herself by battling Sánchez in the incoming contest, intending for the congress to be held as early as March or April 2016, whereas Sánchez sought to have it held in June. A compromise solution was reached in order to avoid a major clash between both sides, with the congress being scheduled for 21 and 22 May and a primary election to be held on 8 May.

Government formation talks nationwide broke down after Sánchez's failed investiture attempt in early March 2016. On 28 March, the PSOE leadership race was postponed indefinitely until a new government was appointed, due to increasing odds of a fresh election being called for 26 June. The party's performance in the eventual 2016 general election, where it narrowly avoided being decisively overcome by the Unidos Podemos coalition, only temporarily halted criticism from party critics. Serious setbacks in the Basque and Galician elections held on 25 September, which had been turned by dissenters into an electoral test of Sánchez, prompted immediate calls for resignation among his opponents, unleashing a party crisis which weakened Sánchez's standing and indicated a loss of support for him within the party. Sánchez refused to step down and instead proposed to have the congress held immediately, scheduling it for 12 and 13 November and the primary election for 23 October, while daring his critics to challenge him in a back-me-or-sack-me vote. This move enraged his opponents, who subsequently forced the resignation of half of the party's executive commission on 28 September in order to trigger Sánchez's downfall. Sánchez did not acknowledge his ouster and sought to keep his promise of an autumn congress, resulting in the party being openly split into two opposing factions, as critics no longer recognized Sánchez's legitimacy to act as secretary-general. In a troubled federal committee held on 1 October, Sánchez finally resigned as party leader after losing a key ballot on his congress' proposal by 132 votes to 107. A caretaker managing committee headed by Asturias President Javier Fernández was appointed to lead the party until the party congress to elect a new leadership could be organized.

Concurrently with the ongoing PSOE crisis, the government formation process continued as the People's Party of Mariano Rajoy had secured the support of both Citizens and Canarian Coalition for Rajoy's investiture. The PSOE caretaker leadership appointed after Sánchez's sacking approved the party's abstention in such a vote, thus ensuring Rajoy's re-election as Prime Minister of Spain despite the party's previous stance not to allow a new PP government. A few hours ahead of the scheduled second ballot that would allow Rajoy's investiture, Pedro Sánchez announced his resignation as an MP—a decision advised by his close aides—arguing that he could neither abstain—and thus break his electoral pledge of opposing a PP government—or, as former PSOE leader, set a bad precedent by disobeying the decision of the highest party governing body, the federal committee. Right after government formation, in an exclusive interview for laSexta's Salvados news show, Pedro Sánchez publicly accused Susana Díaz's allies within the party and the "financial powers"—specially the PRISA Group, owner of El País media outlet—of having coerced him into avoiding a left-wing pact with Podemos and nationalist parties throughout the entire government formation process, accusing them of triggering the internal revolt within PSOE to oust him once he considered a serious attempt at forming such an alliance.

=== Late 2016: Díaz's consolidation, Sánchez in expectation ===
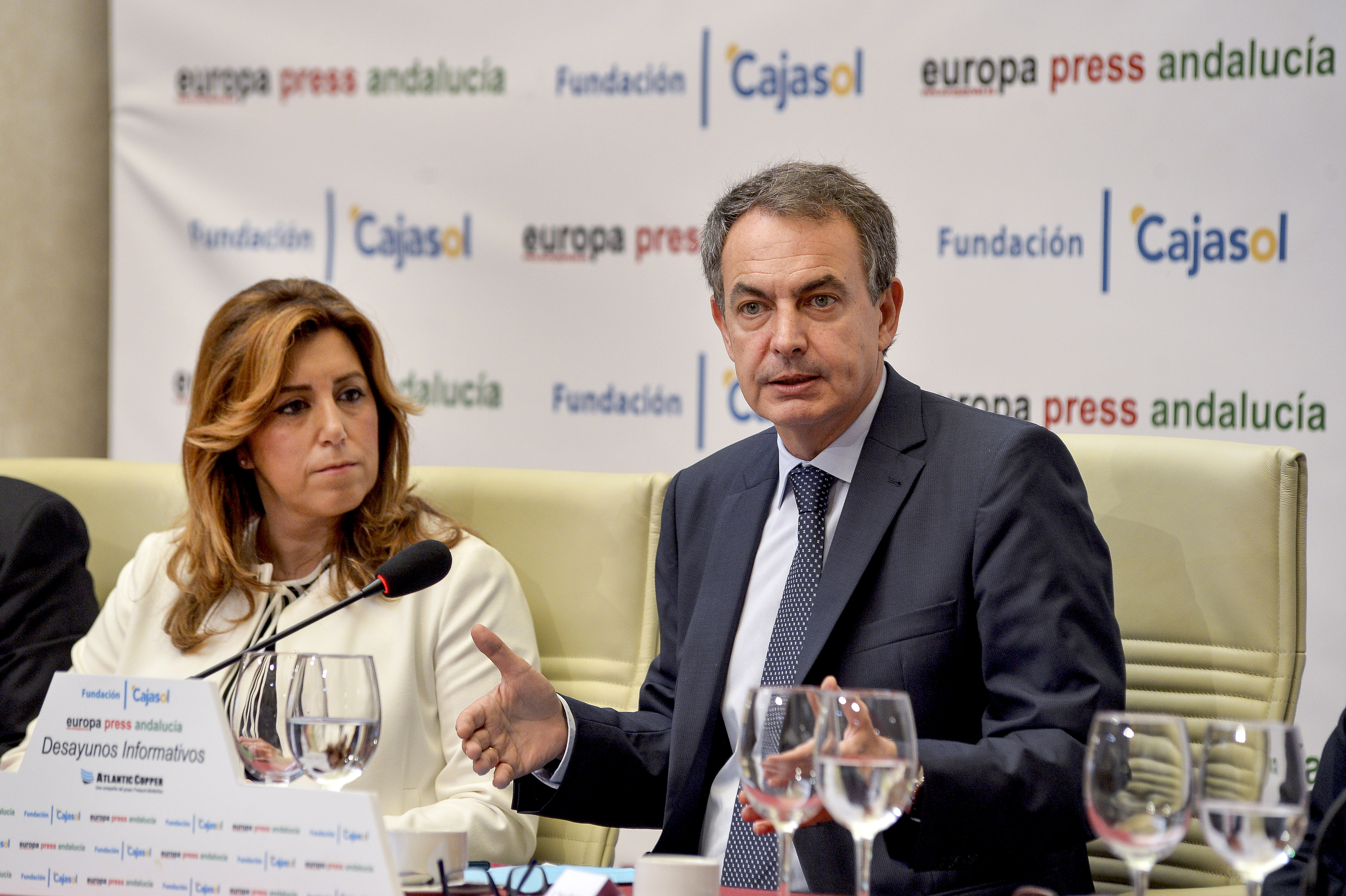
Former Prime Minister José Luis Rodríguez Zapatero had become one of Susana Díaz's most devoted backers in recent times.

Taking advantage of the internal disarray resulting from Sánchez's demise, Susana Díaz, main orchestrator of the party revolt that brought him down, became widely regarded as the new PSOE leader in pectore as the Fernández-led caretaker team came to be seen as a mere puppet body under her control. As Díaz extended her influence throughout the party's structure, she sought party adhesions to its figure and visibility as the PSOE's organic and institutional reference by meeting Socialists' Party of Catalonia leader Miquel Iceta—securing the PSC neutrality for the incoming leadership contest in exchange of the promise to avoid a split between both parties—and planning a tour to the European Parliament as part of the greater national and international scope of her political agenda. She also staged a party rally in Jaén on 16 December, in which she was granted the public and unconditional support of former Prime Minister José Luis Rodríguez Zapatero—long turned into an admirer of the Andalusian President and an opponent to Pedro Sánchez. In the ensuing weeks, Díaz would receive public acclaim from regional Presidents Javier Lambán of Aragon—who publicly endorsed her and went as far as to assure that Díaz was "protected by the gods of Socialism"—and Guillermo Fernández Vara of Extremadura—who commented on her that "she's like a cannon communicating; she sounds like a winner"—.

Close aides to Díaz revealed that she preferred to face the primary election as the sole candidate in order to win unopposed, but the faction critical of the new leadership soon assured they would field a candidate of their own regardless of Díaz's intentions, and all sides soon acknowledged that the race would be competitive. Some called for Pedro Sánchez—who had hinted at such a possibility but had never officially confirmed it—to run again for leadership, but there were those who regarded both Díaz and Sánchez unfit for the role—arguing that their long-lasting grudge for power had deeply divided the party and that none of them would be able to fully re-unite it again—. Proponents of this alternative, 'third' way, considered former President of the Congress of Deputies Patxi López as a potential frontrunner. Support for a potential Patxi López's bid grew among Sánchez's loyalists as time passed and the former PSOE leader remained ambiguous on his intentions.

Concurrently and without revealing his future plans, Sánchez staged several events with the party's grassroots throughout November and December 2016. The first, held in Xirivella in the Valencian Community on 26 November, was an attendance success with more than a thousand assistants. This feat was repeated in another appearance in El Entrego, Asturias, on 10 December. In both events, Sánchez called for the party congress to be held immediately and accused Fernández's caretaker commission of leading the party as a full-fledged executive, when it should be limited—as per party statutes—to organizing the congress. Meanwhile, party members critical of the new PSOE leadership, under the Recupera PSOE platform (Spanish for "Recover [the] PSOE"), opened an unauthorized party office just 500 meters away from the main PSOE headquarters in Madrid to promote affiliation of new members to vote in the primary election, to which the caretaker commission replied by announcing legal actions for improper use and usurpation of the party's symbology.

=== January 2017: Congress announced, enter López and Sánchez ===
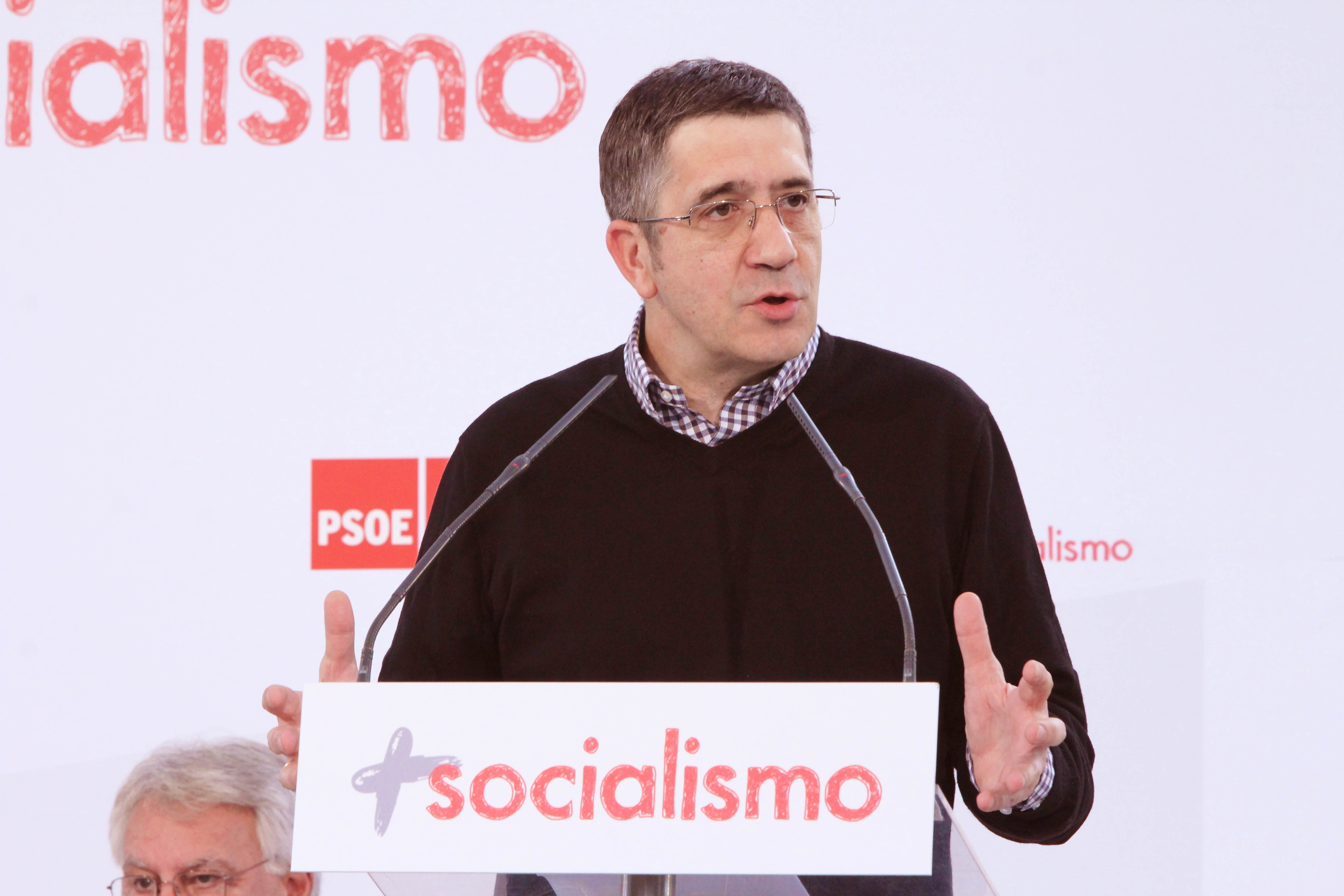
Former Lehendakari Patxi López unexpectedly became, on 15 January 2017, the first to publicly announce his bid, posing as an alternative to both Sánchez and Díaz.

On 14 January 2017, party leaders in federal committee formally set the congress' date for 17 and 18 June with a primary election scheduled for May, the preferred choice of both Javier Fernández and Susana Díaz who had called for postponing the congress' date to "just before summer [2017]" in hopes of Sánchez's support eroding over time. Despite previous calls from critics for the leadership contest to be held earlier, the proposed timetable was reluctantly accepted by critics with little opposition as Fernández and Díaz's faction commanded a comfortable majority among federal committee members. The next day, Patxi López unexpectedly became the first to publicly announce his candidacy to the party's leadership, stating that the party's abstention in Rajoy's investiture had been "an error" and claiming to "feel strong enough to rebuild the party". After weeks of waiting for Sánchez's final decision and of debating on whether it was advisable for the late Secretary-General to return to office, many of his previous supporters switched sides and aligned with López, appealed by his 'third way' project, while calling for Sánchez to join them in an effort to prevent splitting the anti-Díaz vote. Among those withdrawing their support from the former party leader were Balearic President Francina Armengol—the only PSOE regional premier not aligned to Susana Díaz—as well as the party's regional branches in Madrid, the Basque Country, Navarre, Castile and León and La Rioja. Even the PSC, formerly staunch defenders of Sánchez before his deposition, now claimed "neutrality" by virtue of Iceta's agreement with Díaz.

Pedro Sánchez, who was said to be privately upset by López's move—both had been close allies during his time as Secretary-General—, revealed on 18 January he would be meeting party members throughout Spain without clarifying whether he would withdraw from the race or not. Moreover, sources from within his team hinted that he had allegedly already chosen to run, but that he would not make the decision public until it better suited him, instead focusing in warming up his potential candidacy with events widely seen as a defiance to his rivals, such as one scheduled in Seville—Díaz's home province—for 28 January. It was later revealed that López was among those who advised Sánchez to resign his seat, a move which deprived him of a public platform from where to launch his leadership run and for which Sánchez was said to feel "deeply betrayed". Concurrently, Susana Díaz was determined to launch her bid in the ensuing weeks and started assembling campaign teams in the different PSOE regional federations to ready up the party's "machinery" under her control for collecting endorsements once the race would formally start. López's announcement, which was said to initially catch Díaz unprepared, did not alter her plans and, like Sánchez, she remained silent on her intentions to run, aware that her bid for the highest party office would rush a succession race within her party in Andalusia. Some suggested Díaz would try to combine her role as President of the Regional Government of Andalusia with that of PSOE Secretary-General if elected.

While Patxi López had been the first to announce his run and had quickly seen the anti-Díaz coalition coalesce around him, he did not obtain the express support of historical party leaders and long-time friends such as Alfredo Pérez Rubalcaba—who disassociated himself from Lopez's strategy and praised Díaz's "political strength"—. He also stirred up suspicions among Pedro Sánchez's remaining loyalists that his move was an opportunistic maneuver aimed at thwarting Sánchez's potential bid and negotiating a future power sharing with Díaz, despite López's calls that he was willing to "go to the end" in the fight for PSOE's control. Sánchez found himself stranded from most of his previous collaborators and could no longer count with the party apparatus of the anti-Díaz regional federations to back him, facing the challenge of making up a minimal infrastructure able to grant his campaign the required resources for remaining competitive. Meanwhile, Susana Díaz embarked herself in a tour through PSOE territories hostile to her in order to mobilize her supporters, starting in Castile and León from 20 to 22 January. In León, her presence was received amid a polarized environment, with protesters booing and shouting "¡No es no!" (Spanish for "No means no", an unofficial slogan that referred to Sánchez's opposition to the formation of a PP government) and accusing her of "handing over power to one of Europe's most corrupt parties". Díaz and López called for party unity ahead of the congress so as to avoid turning the primaries campaign into a "fratricide battle" that could further aggravate the party crisis, both aware that Sánchez's presence in the race would deeply divide the grassroots.

In his 28 January rally in Dos Hermanas, Seville, which gathered over 1,500 people, Pedro Sánchez announced his run for party leadership. Patxi López welcomed Sánchez to the "debate on proposals" and stated that it was now time of "confronting projects". Meanwhile, Susana Díaz, who concurrently was in a party meeting in Alcalá de los Gazules (Cádiz), remained unsettled on Sánchez's announcement and kept refusing to disclose when would she announce her bid, commenting that "it isn't time to talk about leaderships now" but of "strengthening the party with a winning project, without any complex and useful to Spain".

=== February−March 2017: Díaz officially enters the race ===
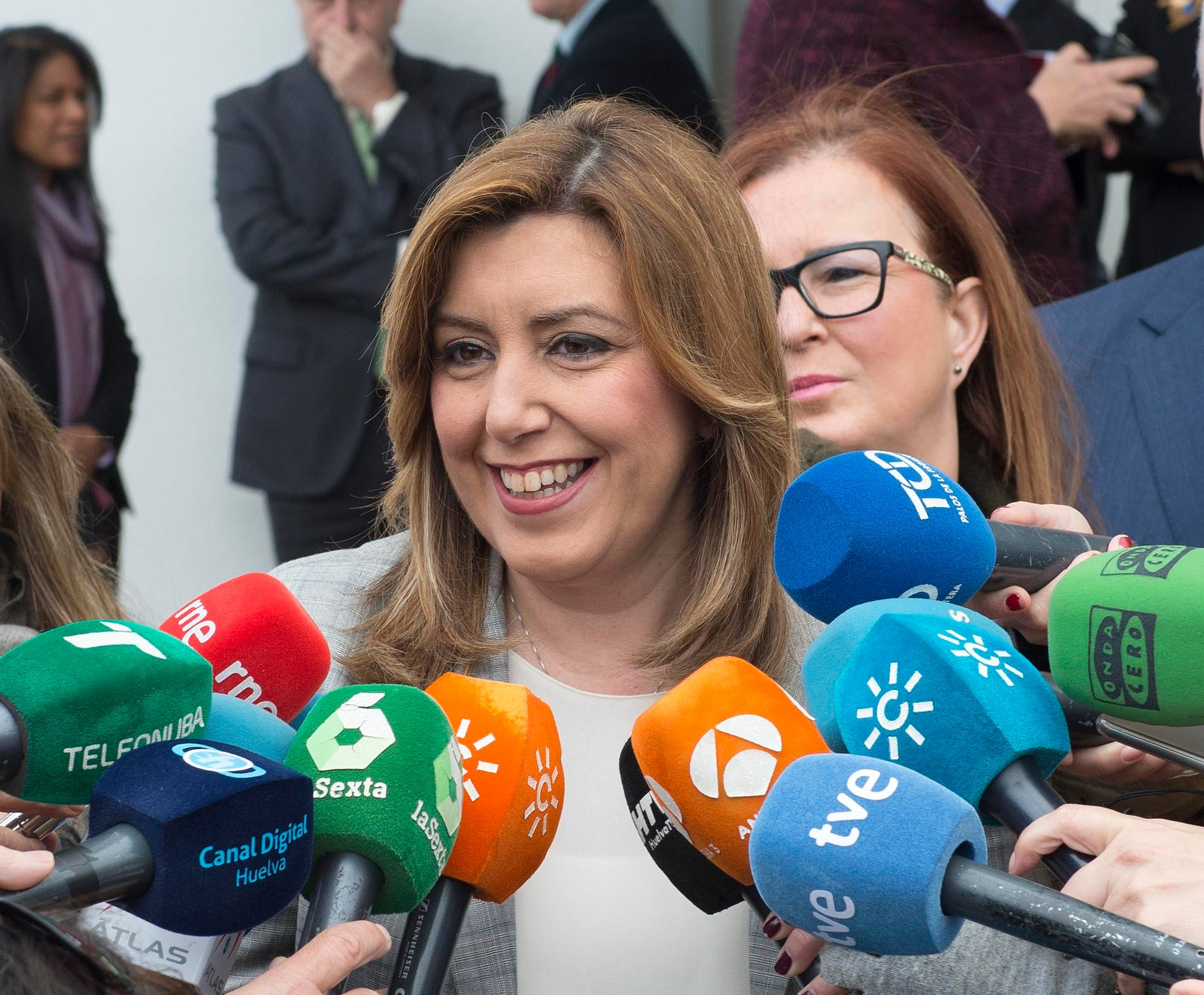
Susana Díaz on 13 March, the day after she confirmed her intention to launch her leadership bid on 26 March.

As two candidates had entered the race, attention focused on Díaz as she refused to publicly disclose her intentions. A party event on 11 February, allegedly intended as a vindication of the party's municipalism in Spain, became an improvised rally in support of Díaz, who had been invited by the event's organizer, Mayor of Vigo Abel Caballero. During the event, attended by 2,500 party officers and supporters, Díaz strongly hinted at her candidacy by claiming that she had "strength, hope, excitement" and "loved winning", while also pointing that the PSOE had to recover its spirit to "win elections". Amid rumours that she intended to make her announcement after the Andalusia Day holiday on 28 February—in order to prevent eclipsing the holiday's institutional celebration—she responded that it was "a government event" and that she was not going to "talk about [her] party". Díaz kept staging various acts as she was allegedly awaiting for the best time to make her announcement, seeking to prevent a possible succession struggle in Andalusia in the event she choose to step down as regional President and leader. Finally on 12 March, several media outlets confirmed that Susana Díaz was poised to announce her bid during a large party rally in Madrid on 26 March, with the party structure under her influence quickly coalescing around her in order to prevent a Pedro Sánchez's win in the primary. In a speech to a crowd of 5,000 supporters, Susana Díaz formally announced her candidacy on 26 March as planned, supported by former PSOE leaders Felipe González, José Luis Rodríguez Zapatero and Alfredo Pérez Rubalcaba, as well as party figures such as Eduardo Madina, Alfonso Guerra, Carme Chacón, José Bono, 11 former ministers, dozens of local mayors and deputation presidents and most of the regional PSOE premiers, who had already rallied around her throughout the previous months.

Concurrently, Pedro Sánchez increased his campaign agenda in Andalusia—which accounted for about a quarter of the party's membership—aware that Díaz's influence in the region and her expected strong primary showing there could dwarf his support in other communities. As Díaz made her bid official, Sánchez proclaimed that there were only "two choices" for party members ahead of the May primaries: "the abstention [to Rajoy] or the [party's] grassroots", while proclaiming that the PSOE itself had to choose whether to be "in front of" or "below or next" to the PP. Sánchez also clashed with the PSOE's managing committee on his campaign's financing: Sánchez's crowdfunding system—through which he had received €38,000 in the first way of its opening, far beyond expectations—was rejected by the later, as they accused Sánchez of not respecting laws on the financing of political parties. The caretaker commission perceived that donations to candidates for an internal party process were also subject to the same legal regulations applied to parties, and that any resulting responsibilities derived from a lack of control of such payments could result in the party bearing ultimate responsibility. As a result, the PSOE demanded all candidates to redirect their funding through a bank account under the party's ownership, something which was initially rejected by Sánchez—who also questioned the legality of such a move—to the party's outrage. On 28 March, the Spanish Court of Auditors ruled in favour of the party's stance and required for Sánchez to respect the financing rules laid down by PSOE. Sánchez reluctantly complied and subsequently shut down his crowdfunding.

Díaz and Sánchez's positions were seen as frontally antagonistic. Whereas Díaz claimed herself to be the representative of "the true PSOE"—vindicating the party's legacy and the much criticized Socialist governments under Felipe González (1982–96) and Rodríguez Zapatero (2004–11)—, Sánchez was heavily critical of the party's direction ever since his resignation, calling himself "the candidate of the grassroots" and demanding a PSOE that was "autonomous, left-wing and credible". Their personal grudge was so intense that PSOE leaders tried to reduce the campaign tone and cast off fears that the losing side in the primaries might not acknowledge the outcome and split from the party. Meanwhile, Patxi López presented himself as "the candidate of integration" and the only one able to unite all sides after the primaries—aware that the Díaz–Sánchez polarization was harmful to his campaign—, calling for "unity" to "recover the PSOE" and for his party colleagues to avoid a "major clash" that could result in a permanent rupture.

=== April 2017: Run up to the primaries ===
On 1 April, the party officially set the primary election for 21 May, with candidates intending to run required to obtain the endorsements of at least 5% of party members between 20 April and 4 May in order to be eligible. As in the 2014 primary, voting was restricted to party members. The congress timetable was approved almost unanimously by the federal committee but was met with the opposition of a handful of Sánchez's supporters, who clashed with the party leadership on the proposed timetable for the communication of membership census—complaining that it might hamper the candidates' collection of endorsements—as well as on the statutory modification proposals which, they claimed, were not delivered to them with enough time in advance. The managing committee rejected these claims and replied that "this has been always done like this", with six Sánchez's supporters ultimately abstaining from the vote on the congress timetable. A single debate was also proposed to be held between the candidates meeting the eligibility requirements, with the PSOE not closing the door to additional debates if candidates so agreed.

With the date for the primary election finally fixed, candidates re-directed their efforts at ensuring enough endorsements to be able to participate in the contest. Susana Díaz commented on the endorsement collection that she gave "a huge value to them [the endorsements]", and that she "greatly respected an endorsement, because when you endorse a person you give your word, you commit yourself and you are able, from that time, to represent that person". Members of her campaign commented that she intended to stage a power demonstration by delivering a huge amount of endorsements, whereas the Sánchez and López campaigns commented that they would only focus their efforts at collecting the required 5% of member signatures to run. Sánchez, nonetheless, spoke against the organization of the primary process—which he saw as built around Díaz's figure and against his campaign—and warned that "no matter the hindrances and favoritisms, there shall be no wall stopping the force of the Socialist militancy".

Díaz's campaign was shaken in early April by two events: on the one hand, Estela Goikoetxea, curtain raiser in Díaz's 26 March rally, resigned as Director of the Public Health Observatory of Cantabria only three days later after it transpired that she had lied on her curriculum vitae, by assuring she was a graduate in Biotechnology for the University of León despite not actually having finished her studies—with this event also incidentally leading to a crisis in Santander after it was exposed that the local mayor, Gema Igual from the People's Party, was in a similar situation—. Then on 4 April, a recording leaked to the media showed Miguel Ángel Heredia, Secretary-General in the Socialist Parliamentary Group in the Congress and one of Díaz's closest aides, heavily criticizing Podemos leader Pablo Iglesias—dubbing him an "enemy" to PSOE—as well as Sánchez's supporters in the parliamentary group—explicitly referring to Margarita Robles as a "motherfucker"—. Heredia also called for the Socialists' Party of Catalonia's "dissolution"—the PSOE–PSC relations had remained strained in the months following the 2016 PSOE crisis—and justified the party coup against Sánchez in an undisclosed—and officially unconfirmed—government agreement between Sánchez, Unidos Podemos and Republican Left of Catalonia in late September 2016, which the party had allegedly learned from CCOO General Secretary Ignacio Fernández Toxo. Toxo immediately denied these claims—claiming to have never heard of such an agreement happening—and urged Heredia to either reveal who his alleged sources within CCOO were or to resign right away, whereas pro-Sánchez deputies demanded his outright resignation. Heredia apologized for his remarks and argued that the discussion—which, he explained, took place at an informal meeting—had been brought out of context, with close aides blaming Sánchez's supporters for the leak. Susana Díaz, visibly upset, claimed that she did not agree with "that kind of assessments, wherever they come from" and that she had been "working for months to recover the respect and fraternity between party colleagues". She, however, did not think that Heredia had to resign.

The sudden death of former Minister of Defence and party colleague Carme Chacón on 9 April prompted all three candidates for the PSOE leadership to suspend their campaigns for the ensuing days in a show of respect. Little activity ensued during the Holy Week holidays in mid-April, with the candidates focused in the collection of endorsements from 20 April to 4 May.

== Timetable ==
The key dates are listed below (all times are CET):

- 1 April: Official announcement of the congress.
- 17 April: Start of pre-candidacy submission period.
- 19 April: End of pre-candidacy submission period at 12 pm.
- 20 April: Start of endorsement collection period.
- 4 May: End of endorsement collection period at 12 pm.
- 8 May: Proclamation of candidates to the party general secretariat.
- 9 May: Official start of internal information campaign.
- 20 May: Last day of internal information campaign.
- 21 May: Primary election.
- 24–28 May: Election of congress delegates.
- 28 May: Deadline for amendment submission.
- 16–18 June: Federal congress.

== Candidates ==
Candidate	Notable positions	Announced	Campaign	Ref.
=== Proclaimed ===
Candidates who met endorsement requirements and were officially proclaimed to contest the party congress.
Patxi López (age 57)	Member of the Congress of Deputies for Biscay (1987–1989 and since 2016); President of the Congress of Deputies (2016); Secretary of Political Action, Citizenship and Liberties of the PSOE (2014–2016); Secretary of Political Relations of the PSOE (2012–2014); Member of the Basque Parliament for Álava (2012–2014); Secretary-General of the PSE–EE (PSOE) (2002–2014); Lehendakari (2009–2012); Member of the Basque Parliament for Biscay (1991–2012); Secretary-General of the PSE–EE (PSOE) in Biscay (1997–2002); Secretary of Organization of the PSE–EE (PSOE) (1991–1995); Secretary-General of the JSE–EGAZ (1985–1988)	15 January 2017	(patxilopez.com)	
Pedro Sánchez (age 45)	Secretary-General of the PSOE (2014–2016); Leader of the Opposition of Spain (2014–2016); Member of the Congress of Deputies for Madrid (2009–2011 and 2013–2016); City Councillor of Madrid (2004–2009)	28 January 2017	(sanchezcastejon.es)	
Susana Díaz (age 42)	President of the Regional Government of Andalusia (since 2013); Secretary-General of the PSOE–A (since 2013); Member of the Parliament of Andalusia for Seville (since 2008); Minister of the Presidency and Equality of Andalusia (2012–2013); Secretary-General of the PSOE–A in the province of Seville (2012–2013); Senator appointed by the Parliament of Andalusia (2011–2012); Secretary of Organization of the PSOE–A (2010–2012); Secretary of Organization of the PSOE–A in the province of Seville (2004–2010); Member of the Congress of Deputies for Seville (2004–2008); Deputy Mayor for Human Resources of Seville (2003–2004); City Councillor of Seville (1999–2004); Secretary of Organization of the JSA (1997–2004)	26 March 2017	(100por100psoe.com)	
=== Failed to qualify ===
Candidates who announced an intention to run, but failed to qualify due to not meeting endorsement requirements.
Aurelio Belando (age 66)	None	19 April 2017	—	
Pedro Antonio Ibáñez (age 45)	None	19 April 2017	—	
José Froilán Moreno (age 53)	None	19 April 2017	—	
Manuel Pérez (age 69)	None	19 April 2017	—	

=== Declined ===
The individuals in this section were the subject of speculation about their possible candidacy, but publicly denied or recanted interest in running:

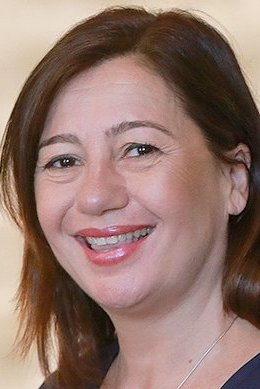
Francina Armengol

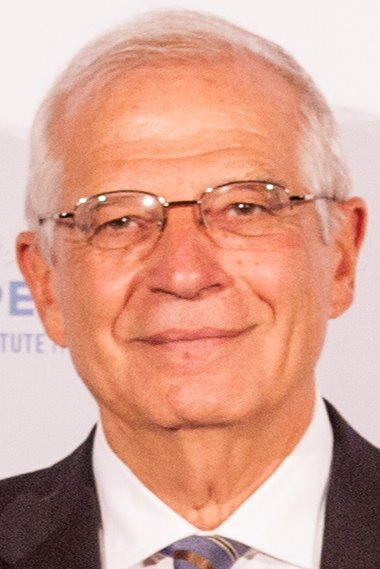
Josep Borrell

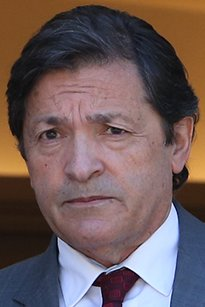
Javier Fernández

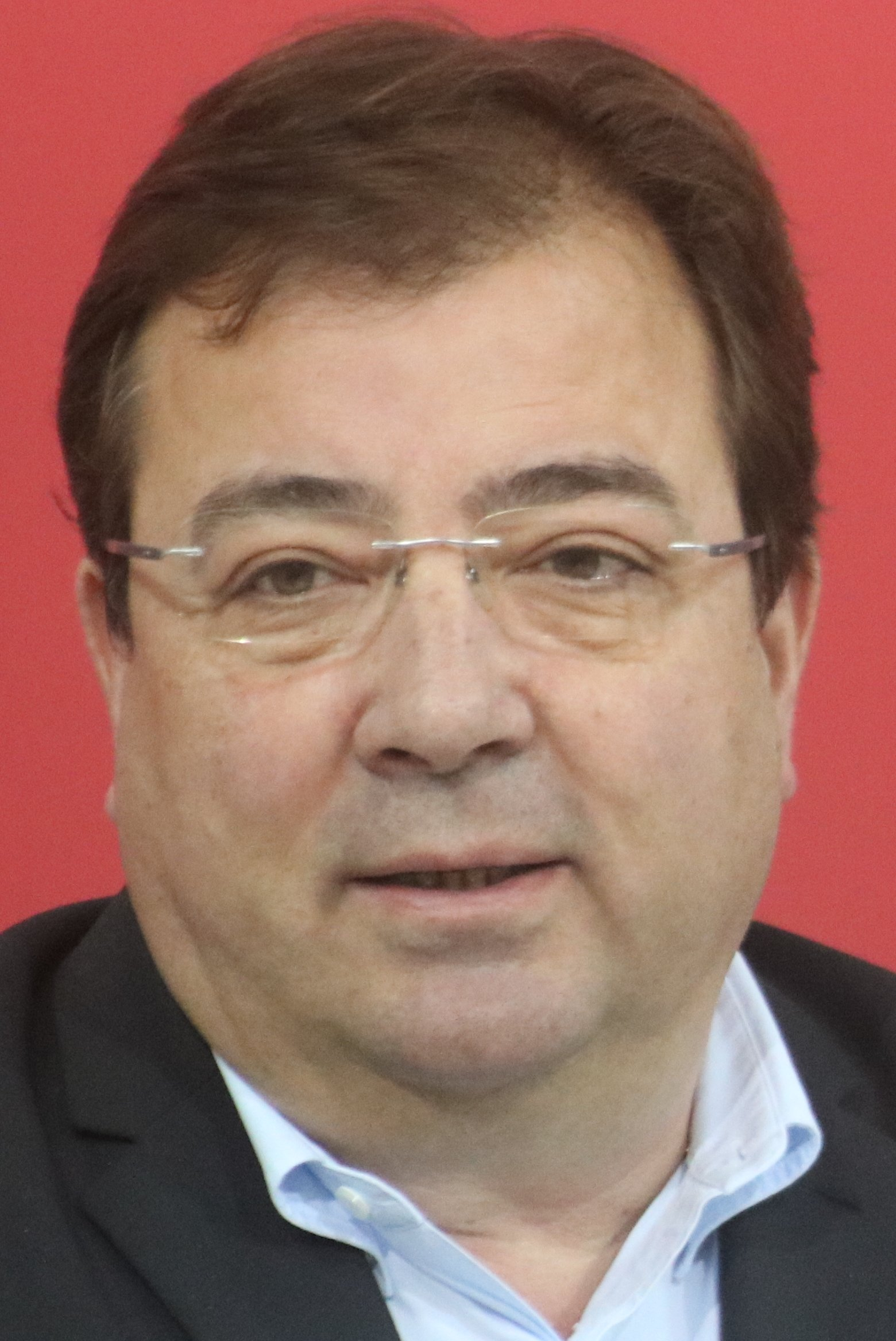
Guillermo Fernández Vara
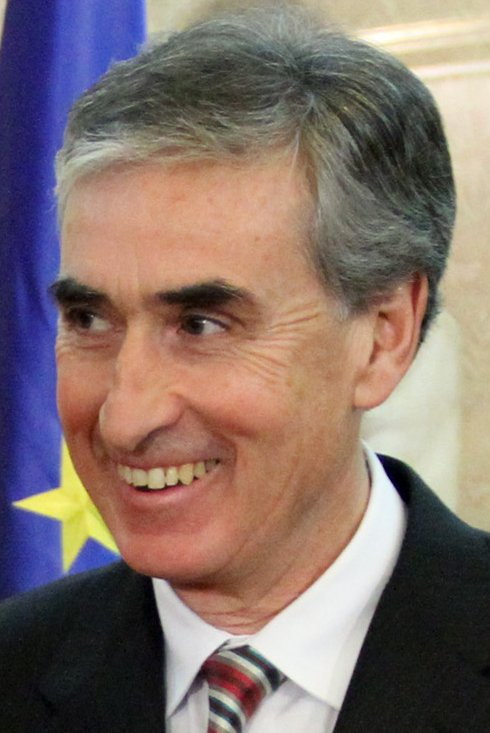
Ramón Jáuregui

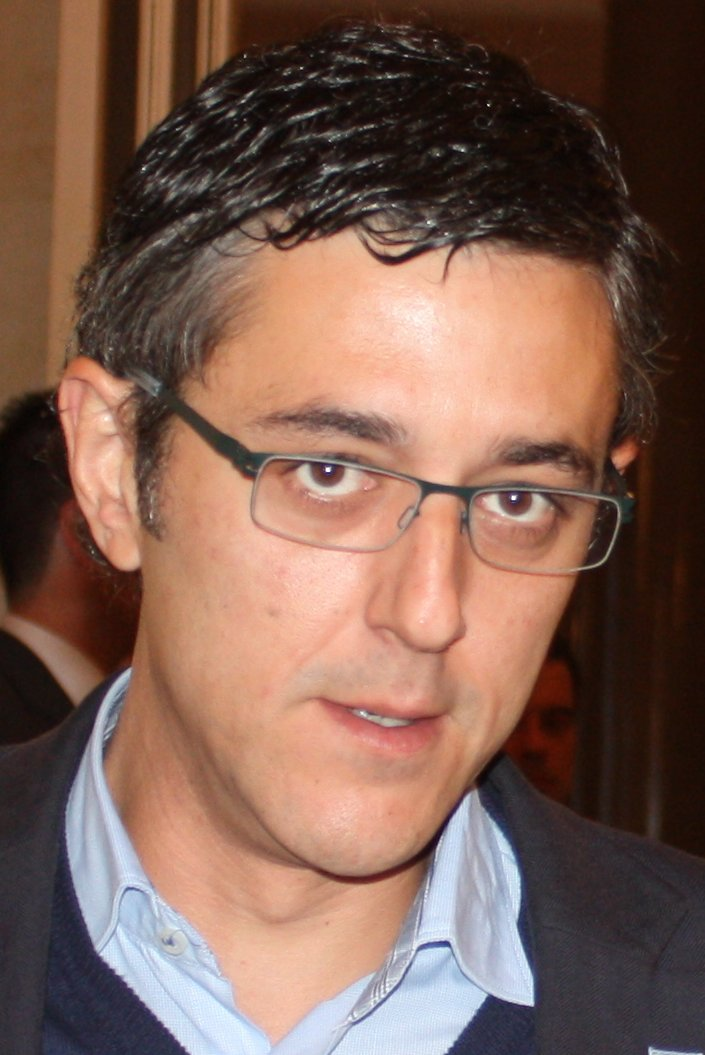
Eduardo Madina

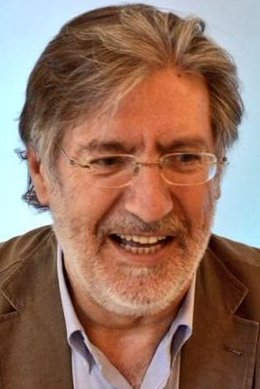
José Antonio Pérez Tapias

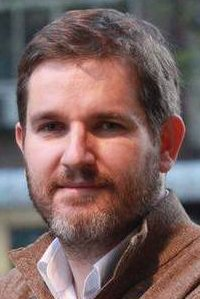
Ignacio Urquizu
- Francina Armengol (age 45) — President of the Government of the Balearic Islands (since 2015); Secretary-General of the PSIB–PSOE (since 2012); Member of the Parliament of the Balearic Islands for Mallorca (since 1999); Member of the PSOE Executive Commission (2004–2016); Spokesperson of the Socialist Group in the Parliament of the Balearic Islands (2004–2007 and 2011–2015); Secretary-General of the PSIB–PSOE in Mallorca (2000–2012); President of the Island Council of Mallorca (2007–2011); Councillor in the Island Council of Mallorca (1999–2004 and 2007–2011); City Councillor of Inca (1998–2000).
- Josep Borrell (age 70) — Member of the European Parliament for Spain (2004–2009); President of the European Parliament (2004–2007); Member of the Congress of Deputies for Barcelona (1986–2004); Member of the PSOE Executive Commission (1997–2000); Leader of the Opposition of Spain (1998–1999); Spokesperson of the Socialist Group of the Congress (1998–1999); Minister of Public Works, Transport and Environment of Spain (1993–1996); Minister of Public Works and Urbanism of Spain (1991–1993); Secretary of State of Finance of Spain (1984–1991); Secretary-General of Budget and Public Expenditure of Spain (1982–1984); City Councillor of Majadahonda (1979–1983).
- Javier Fernández (age 69) — President of the PSOE Caretaker Commission (since 2016); President of the Principality of Asturias (since 2012); Member of the General Junta of the Principality of Asturias for the Central District (since 2007); Secretary-General of the FSA–PSOE (since 2000); Member of the PSOE Executive Commission (2012–2014); Senator appointed by the General Junta of the Principality of Asturias (2003–2012); Minister of Industry, Trade and Tourism of Asturias (1999–2000); Member of the Congress of Deputies for Asturias (1996–1999); Director-General for Mines and Energy of Asturias (1991–1995).
- Guillermo Fernández Vara (age 58) — President of the Regional Government of Extremadura (2007–2011 and since 2015); Secretary-General of the PSOE of Extremadura (since 2008); Member of the Assembly of Extremadura for Badajoz (since 2003); Minister of Health and Consumer Affairs of Extremadura (1999–2007); City Councillor of Olivenza (1999); Minister of Social Welfare of Extremadura (1996–1999); Director-General of Public Health and Consumer Affairs of Extremadura (1995–1996).
- Ramón Jáuregui (age 68) — President of the PSOE Delegation in the European Parliament (since 2016); Member of the European Parliament for Spain (2009–2010 and since 2014); Member of the Congress of Deputies for Álava (2000–2009 and 2011–2014); Minister of the Presidency (2010–2011); Secretary-General of the PSOE Delegation in the European Parliament (2009–2010); Secretary of Regional Policy of the PSOE (1997–2000); Member of the Basque Parliament for Gipuzkoa (1980–1983 and 1990–1998); Minister of Justice, Labour and Social Security of the Basque Country (1995–1997); Secretary-General of the PSE–PSOE/PSE–EE (PSOE) (1988–1997); Vice Lehendakari (1987–1991); President of the PSE–PSOE (1985–1988); Delegate of the Government of Spain in the Basque Country (1983–1987); City Councillor of San Sebastián (1979–1980); President of the Caretaker Commission of the City Council of San Sebastián (1978–1979).
- Eduardo Madina (age 41) — Member of the Congress of Deputies for Madrid (since 2016); Member of the Congress of Deputies for Biscay (2004–2015); Secretary-General of the Socialist Parliamentary Group in the Congress (2009–2014); Member of the PSOE Executive Commission (2008–2014); City Councillor of Sestao (1999–2001).
- José Antonio Pérez Tapias (age 62) — Member of the Congress of Deputies for Granada (2006–2011).
- Ignacio Urquizu (age 38) — Member of the Congress of Deputies for Teruel (since 2016); Senator for Teruel (2015); Member of the Cortes of Aragon for Teruel (2015).

== Endorsements ==
Candidates seeking to run were required to collect the endorsements of at least 5% of party members.

Summary of candidate endorsement results
Candidate	Count	% T	% V
Susana Díaz	60,231	32.05	48.27
Pedro Sánchez	53,692	28.57	43.03
Patxi López	10,866	5.78	8.71
Aurelio Belando	Eliminated (below 5%)		
Pedro Antonio Ibáñez	Eliminated (below 5%)		
José Froilán Moreno	Eliminated (below 5%)		
Manuel Pérez	Eliminated (below 5%)		
Total	124,789		
Valid endorsements	124,789	66.40	
Not endorsing	63,160	33.60	
Total members	187,949		

Endorsements by party members
Díaz	48.27%
Sánchez	43.03%
López	8.71%

== Campaign ==
=== Debates ===
39th PSOE Federal Congress debates
Date	Organisers	Moderator(s)	P Present NI Not invited			
Date	Organisers	Moderator(s)	Díaz	López	Sánchez	Ref.
15 May	PSOE (Note: Broadcast live simultaneously on 4 national TV networks and 4 national radio stations.)	Carmen del Riego	P	P	P	

Opinion polls

Candidate viewed as "performing best" or "most convincing" in each debate
Debate	Polling firm/Commissioner	Díaz	López	Sánchez	None	Question
15 May	SocioMétrica	28.0	16.0	27.0	29.0	–
15 May	Invymark	32.6	30.2	28.5	–	8.7

== Opinion polls ==
Poll results are listed in the tables below in reverse chronological order, showing the most recent first, and using the date the survey's fieldwork was done, as opposed to the date of publication. If such date is unknown, the date of publication is given instead. The highest percentage figure in each polling survey is displayed in bold, and the background shaded in the candidate's colour. In the instance of a tie, the figures with the highest percentages are shaded. Polls show data gathered among PSOE voters/supporters as well as Spanish voters as a whole, but not among party members, who were the ones ultimately entitled to vote in the primary election.

=== PSOE voters ===
Polling firm/Commissioner	Fieldwork date	Sample size							Other /None	Question	Lead
Polling firm/Commissioner	Fieldwork date	Sample size	Díaz	López	Sánchez	Madina	Fernández	Borrell	Other /None	Question	Lead
**Primary election**	21 May 2017	—N/a (Note: PSOE members.)	39.6	9.8	**49.9**	–	–	–	0.7	—N/a	10.3
SocioMétrica/El Español	16 May 2017	450	23.9	18.2	**44.2**	–	–	–	–	13.7	20.3
NC Report/La Razón	8–13 May 2017	?	**42.1**	17.2	40.7	–	–	–	–	–	1.4
Sigma Dos/El Mundo	8–10 May 2017	?	27.1	14.4	**52.0**	–	–	–	–	6.5	24.9
NC Report/La Razón	2–6 May 2017	500	**42.3**	17.5	40.2	–	–	–	–	–	2.1
SocioMétrica/El Español	5–12 Apr 2017	200	28.9	15.4	**43.2**	–	–	–	12.5		14.3
NC Report/La Razón	20–24 Mar 2017	400	**33.5**	23.5	29.5	–	–	–	–	13.5	4.0
DYM/El Confidencial	7–15 Mar 2017	?	11.8	28.9	**48.4**	–	–	–	3.7	7.2	19.5
DYM/El Confidencial	7–15 Mar 2017	?	–	39.3	**52.6**	–	–	–	8.1		13.3
Sigma Dos/El Mundo	27 Feb–2 Mar 2017	?	18.6	31.8	**43.9**	–	–	–	–	5.7	12.1
GESOP/El Periódico	19–22 Feb 2017	?	16.0	26.7	**49.5**	–	–	–	7.8		22.8
SocioMétrica/El Español	13–17 Feb 2016	200	22.2	30.0	**33.5**	–	–	–	14.3		3.5
GAD3/ABC	25 Jan–2 Feb 2017	?	13.0	**30.0**	27.0	5.0	5.0	–	5.0	16.0	3.0
NC Report/La Razón	13–15 Jan 2017	207	**33.8**	23.2	21.3	–	–	–	–	21.7	10.6
Sigma Dos/El Mundo	23–29 Dec 2016	?	34.7	–	**53.8**	–	–	–	–	11.6	19.1
SocioMétrica/El Español	22–29 Dec 2016	200	18.4	28.9	**36.6**	–	2.6	–	6.9	8.8	7.7
SocioMétrica/El Español	28 Nov–2 Dec 2016	?	16.5	–	**66.1**	–	–	–	17.4		49.6
MyWord/Cadena SER	17–22 Nov 2016	?	16.2	17.1	**35.8**	9.3	–	12.3	4.6	4.7	18.7
SocioMétrica/El Español	31 Oct–4 Nov 2016	?	20.7	–	**37.7**	13.6	–	11.5	16.6		17.0
DYM/El Confidencial	27 Sep–6 Oct 2016	?	23.9	–	**38.9**	9.0	–	–	28.2		15.0
SocioMétrica/El Español	26–30 Sep 2016	?	25.4	–	**37.2**	21.2	–	–	15.3		11.8

=== Spanish voters ===
Polling firm/Commissioner	Fieldwork date	Sample size							Other /None	Question	Lead
Polling firm/Commissioner	Fieldwork date	Sample size	Díaz	López	Sánchez	Madina	Fernández	Borrell	Other /None	Question	Lead
Sigma Dos/El Mundo	8–10 May 2017	1,200	**32.5**	20.6	29.3	–	–	–	–	17.6	3.2
SocioMétrica/El Español	5–12 Apr 2017	800	28.0	18.7	**28.1**	–	–	–	25.2		0.1
DYM/El Confidencial	7–15 Mar 2017	1,010	20.9	27.4	**39.9**	–	–	–	5.8	6.0	12.5
DYM/El Confidencial	7–15 Mar 2017	1,010	–	42.4	**47.2**	–	–	–	10.4		4.8
Sigma Dos/El Mundo	27 Feb–2 Mar 2017	1,000	25.4	27.6	**31.3**	–	–	–	–	16.7	3.7
GESOP/El Periódico	19–22 Feb 2017	1,000	22.5	27.4	**36.2**	–	–	–	13.9		8.8
SocioMétrica/El Español	13–17 Feb 2017	800	25.0	19.5	**26.8**	–	–	–	28.7		1.8
GAD3/ABC	25 Jan–2 Feb 2017	805	12.4	**20.3**	18.0	4.4	8.2	–	4.8	31.9	2.3
Sigma Dos/El Mundo	23–29 Dec 2016	1,000	**40.6**	–	38.6	–	–	–	–	20.7	2.0
SocioMétrica/El Español	22–29 Dec 2016	800	**23.5**	14.9	18.7	–	5.1	–	18.0	19.8	4.8
SocioMétrica/El Español	28 Nov–2 Dec 2016	800	26.8	–	**37.6**	–	–	–	35.6		10.8
MyWord/Cadena SER	17–22 Nov 2016	1,000	13.9	14.8	**19.0**	11.5	–	9.0	7.8	24.0	4.2
SocioMétrica/El Español	31 Oct–4 Nov 2016	800	21.6	–	**25.1**	12.6	–	10.0	30.7		3.5
InvyMark/laSexta	31 Oct–4 Nov 2016	?	**28.3**	15.5	22.0	–	–	15.7	–	18.5	6.3
DYM/El Confidencial	27 Sep–6 Oct 2016	1,132	14.4	–	**18.4**	10.4	–	–	56.8		4.0
SocioMétrica/El Español	26–30 Sep 2016	1,000	21.4	–	**31.5**	17.3	–	–	29.7		10.1

== Results ==
=== Primary ===
==== Overall ====
Summary of the 21 May 2017 PSOE primary results
Candidate	Votes	%
Pedro Sánchez	74,805	49.93
Susana Díaz	59,392	39.64
Patxi López	14,652	9.78
Blank ballots	977	0.65
Total	149,826	
Valid votes	149,826	99.92
Invalid votes	125	0.08
Votes cast / turnout	149,951	79.78
Abstentions	37,998	20.22
Total members	187,949	

Vote by party members
Sánchez	49.93%
Díaz	39.64%
López	9.78%
Blank ballots	0.65%

==== By region ====
Region	Electorate	Turnout	Pedro Sánchez		Susana Díaz		Patxi López	
Region	Electorate	Turnout	Votes	%	Votes	%	Votes	%
Andalusia	45,848	81.62	12,739	31.85	25,188	62.98	2,065	5.17
Aragon	7,953	78.23	2,915	45.95	2,767	43.62	662	10.43
Asturias	8,093	81.71	3,578	53.41	2,654	39.62	467	6.97
Balearic Islands	2,372	77.22	1,402	71.10	351	17.80	219	11.10
Basque Country	5,337	79.78	1,715	40.38	315	7.42	2,217	52.20
Canary Islands	6,338	73.79	2,835	56.46	1,621	32.28	565	11.26
Cantabria	2,815	81.72	1,697	71.36	342	14.38	339	14.26
Castile and León	9,634	82.00	4,325	53.23	3,068	37.76	732	9.01
Castilla–La Mancha	12,190	84.52	5,270	48.32	4,783	43.86	853	7.82
Catalonia	14,615	69.37	8,302	81.90	1,191	11.75	644	6.35
Ceuta	324	71.47	168	64.86	72	27.80	19	7.34
Extremadura	9,537	81.17	4,036	49.44	3,535	43.30	593	7.26
Galicia	10,142	78.91	5,442	65.74	2,235	27.00	601	7.26
La Rioja	1,151	83.85	602	60.87	225	22.75	162	16.38
Madrid	14,323	79.55	6,222	49.49	3,993	31.76	2,358	18.75
Melilla	251	84.94	167	63.98	69	26.44	25	9.58
Murcia	5,851	83.66	2,523	49.13	2,065	40.21	547	10.66
Navarre	1,460	82.37	864	70.13	205	16.64	163	13.23
Valencian Community	17,173	84.19	9,736	62.77	4,426	28.54	1,348	8.69
Europe	151	69.43	85	53.46	54	33.96	20	12.58
Americas	1,630	28.79	182	38.89	233	49.79	53	11.32
Direct	4,199	—N/a						
JSE	6,562	—N/a						
Total	187,949	79.78	74,805	50.26	59,392	39.90	14,652	9.84

=== Congress ===
Summary of the 17−18 June 2017 PSOE congress results
Candidate	SG		Executive	
Candidate	Votes	%	Votes	%
Pedro Sánchez	Unopposed		674	71.10
Blank ballots	—N/a		274	28.90
Total	—N/a		948	
Valid votes	—N/a		948	99.16
Invalid votes	—N/a		8	0.84
Votes cast / turnout	—N/a		956	96.76
Not voting	—N/a		32	3.24
Total delegates	988		988	

Vote by delegates (Executive Commission)
Sánchez	71.10%
Blank ballots	28.90%
