= Josefina Samper =

Spanish activist (1927–2018)

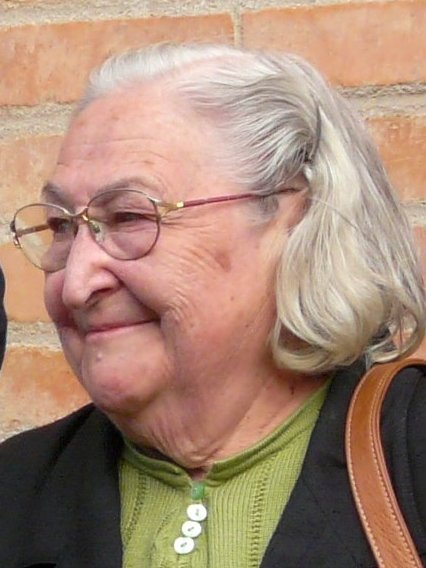
- Samper in 2008
- Born: Josefina Samper Rojas; 8 May 1927; Fondón, Almeria, Spain
- Died: 13 February 2018 (aged 90); Madrid, Spain
- Occupation: Syndicalist
- Political party: Communist Party of Spain; CC.OO; Democratic Movement of Women
- Spouse: Marcelino Camacho Abad
- Children: 2

Josefina Samper Rojas (8 May 1927 – 13 February 2018) was a Spanish syndicalist and feminist, a member of the Communist Party of Spain (PCE), and spouse of Marcelino Camacho.

== Biography ==
Born in Fondón, Spain on 8 May 1927. At three years old her father, a miner, emigrated to Oran, Algeria. She moved with the rest of her family a year later to join her father. While in Oran, Josefina took care of her sister while her mother worked washing clothes in the houses. Later, Josefina went to work as a trouser dresser in a clothing workshop. At age 12 she started militancy in the Unified Socialist Youth, and at 14 she joined the PCE at the hands of Roberto Carrillo, a brother of Santiago Carrillo.

As a party activist, Josefina participated in the distribution of the España Popular publications. She organized children to use cans as drums to warn the neighborhood when the police arrived in search of the hidden Republicans. She also created a cooperative dedicated to the manufacture of raffia shoes. Josefina was responsible for obtaining the raffia. The benefits were divided among members according to the amount of shoes made, with Josefina receiving the lowest profits. With these profits she maintained her house, as well as helped many other families, mostly of political emigrants.

=== Work with Marcelino Camacho ===
Together with other women, she formed a support group for immigrants and political refugees. In 1944, this effort led her to receive, on behalf of the party, the task of organizing an aperitif for three prisoners fled from the concentration camp. That is how she met Marcelino Camacho, with whom she married on December 22, 1948. The couple had two children, Yenia and Marcel. In 1957, after the pardon of Marcelino, they returned to Spain from exile, moving to the neighborhood of Carabanchel, in Madrid, in a modest apartment where they lived until 2010, when Marcelino's poor health forced them to move to another floor in Majadahonda. In his neighborhood of Carabanchel both continued their clandestine political and trade union activity that led to the successive imprisonment of Marcelino. It was then that Josefina and other women, some wives of prisoners and others members Communist party, mobilized, creating in 1965 the Women's Democratic Movement. This began the current feminist movement, dedicated to fighting, inside and outside of Spain, to help political prisoners, achieving certain improvements in the conditions in which they were confined. During these years, Josefina gave up looking for a job outside the home, because she needed to dedicate all her time to the cause, so her children, Yenia and Marcel, took responsibility for taking the salary to the family home, while Josefina spent the little time she had to sew pants for a tailor shop and knit sweaters for a wool store.

On November 25, 1975, King Juan Carlos I granted a pardon to the prisoners who had been imprisoned by the 1001 Process, including Marcelino Camacho. Thus began a new life outside the clandestine life that allowed them to rekindle the political and union struggle that Josefina still maintained a few years after the death of Marcelino.

=== Later years ===
After the death of Marcelino Camacho on 29 October 2010, Josefina maintained a great activity as a transmitter of the memory and voice of her husband, offering frequent talks throughout Spain, helping to inspire the struggle for workers' rights to the new generations. She died on 13 February 2018.
