= National Federation of Mining =

Mining trade union in Spain

- Federación Estatal de la Minería
- Formation: 1976
- Dissolved: 1993
- Merger of: Federation of Metalworkers and Miners
- Location: Spain
- Members: 11,604 (1993)
- Parent organization: Workers' Commissions

The National Federation of Mining (Spanish: Federación Estatal de la Minería) was a trade union representing workers in the mining industry in Spain.

The union was founded in 1976 and affiliated to the Workers' Commissions. It had 15,118 in 1981, but by 1993 its membership had fallen to 11,604. Later that year, it merged with the Federation of Metal, to form the Federation of Metalworkers and Miners.

== General Secretaries ==
1978: Manuel Nevado Madrid
1990: Rafael Varea Nieto
