= Federation of Services =

Federation of Services is the name of:

- Federation of Services (France), a trade union in France
- Federation of Services (Spain), a trade union in Spain
