= Federation of Agriculture =

The Federation of Agriculture (Spanish: Federación Estatal del Campo, FECAMPO) was a trade union representing workers in agricultural sector in Spain.

The union was founded in 1977, as an affiliate of the Workers' Commissions. By 1981, it had 15,689 members, and as of 1994 its membership had grown slightly, to 17,899. In 2000, it merged with the Federation of Food Processing, to form the Federation of Agrifood.
