= Proceso 1001 =

The Proceso 1001 or Proceso 1001 de 1972 (lit. 'Trial 1001' or '1972 Trial 1001') of the Court of Public Order took place during the Franco dictatorship in Spain, in 1973, although it began in 1972. It resulted in the sentencing to prison of the entire leadership of the Workers' Commissions trade union.

== History ==
On 24 June 1972, the leadership of Workers' Commissions, an illegal trade union and main opponent of the dictatorship in the labor sphere, was arrested at the convent of the Oblates in Pozuelo de Alarcón (Madrid) where it was meeting with the workers.

They remained imprisoned until the trial was held over a year later. The trial finally took place on the 20th -which coincided with the assassination of the President of the Government, Luis Carrero Blanco, which caused the suspension of the trial for a few hours-, 21 and 22 December 1973. The defendants faced the accusation of being leaders of the Workers' Commissions, and as such belonging to an illegal organization due to their alleged link with the Communist Party of Spain, which would be a clear case of illicit association. On December 30, the sentences were announced, which coincided with the prosecutor's requests and whose severity is considered to be related to the attack against Carrero Blanco. The ten members of the leadership, who became known as the Carabanchel Ten, were sentenced to prison. The prison sentences were as follows:

- Marcelino Camacho, 20 years
- Nicolás Sartorius, 19 years
- Miguel Ángel Zamora Antón, 12 years
- Pedro Santiesteban, 12 years
- Eduardo Saborido, 20 years
- Francisco García Salve (worker priest), 19 years
- Luis Fernández, 12 years
- Francisco Acosta, 12 years
- Juan Muñiz Zapico Juanín, 18 years
- Fernando Soto Martín, 17 years

A year later, the Supreme Court reviewed the sentences, lowering them considerably:

- Marcelino Camacho to 6 years
- Nicolás Sartorius to 5 years
- Miguel Ángel Zamora Antón to 2 years
- Pedro Santiesteban to 2 years
- Eduardo Saborido to 5 years
- Francisco García Salve to 5 years
- Luis Fernández to 2 years
- Francisco Acosta to 2 years
- Juan Muñiz Zapico to 4 years
- Fernando Soto Martín to 4 years in prison.

Shortly after the death of dictator Francisco Franco, those imprisoned for Proceso 1001 were pardoned by King Juan Carlos I on 25 November 1975.
