= Federation of Health and Social Health =

The Federation of Health and Social Health (Spanish: Federación de Sanidad y Sectores Sociosanitarios, FSS) is a trade union representing workers in the health sector in Spain.

The union was founded in 1977, as the National Federation of Health, and it affiliated to the Workers' Commissions. By 1981, it had 4,700 members, but by 1995 its membership had grown to 39,485.
