= Federation of Private Services =

The Federation of Private Services (Spanish: Federación de Servicios Privados, FSP) was a Spanish trade union representing workers in various service industries in Spain.

== History ==
The union was established in 1984, as the Federation of Diverse Activities, and it affiliated to the Workers' Commissions. At its first conference, the following year, it established sectors for workers in the following industries:

- Cleaning
- Private security
- Urban sanitation
- Home care services
- Domestic work
- Dry cleaning and laundries
- Disinfection and extermination
- Recycling
- Phone booth maintenance
- Maintenance of markets
- Porters
- Hairdressing
- Other ancillary industries

By 1994, the union had 31,681 members. It adopted its final name in 2013, and the following year, it merged with the Federation of Construction, Wood and Related Industries, to form the Federation of Construction and Services.
