= Federation of Banking and Savings =

The Federation of Banking and Savings (Spanish: Federación Estatal de Banca y Ahorro, FEBA) was a Spanish trade union representing workers in the finance sector in Spain.

The union was founded on 28 November 1976, and affiliated to the Workers' Commissions. It had 7,868 members in 1981, and by 1994 its membership had grown to 31,863. In 1997, it merged with the National Federation of Insurance, to form the Federation of Financial and Administrative Services.

== General Secretaries ==
1978: Jesús Vela
1981: José María Calado
1982: José Manuel de la Parra
1985: Eduardo Alcaín
1987: Javier Rosaleny
