= Federation of Transport, Communication and Sea =

The Federation of Transport, Communication and Sea (Spanish: Federación Estatal de Transportes, Comunicaciones y Mar, FETCOMAR) was a trade union representing workers in several related sectors, in Spain.

The union was established in 1987, when the Federation of Transport and Communications merged with the Federation of the Sea. Like both its predecessors, it affiliated to the Workers' Commissions (CCOO). As of 1994 it was CCOO's second largest affiliate, with 74,361 members. In 1997, it merged with the Federation of Paper, Graphic Arts, Communications and Entertainment, to form the Federation of Communication and Transport.
