= Federation of Citizens' Services =

Spanish trade union

The Federation of Citizens' Services (Spanish: Federación de Servicios a la Ciudadanía, FSC) is a trade union representing workers in the public sector in Spain.

The union was founded in 2009, with the merger of the Federation of Communication and Transport, and the Federation of Public Administration Employees. Like both its predecessors, it affiliated to the Workers' Commissions (CCOO). By 2014, it was CCOO's largest affiliate, with 263,000 members.
