= Federation of Education =

The Federation of Education (Spanish: Federación de Enseñanza, FE) is a Spanish trade union representing workers in the education sector in Spain.

The union was established in 1978, and affiliated to the Workers' Commissions. In 1981, it had only 2,680 members, but by 1995, membership had grown to 42,340.

== General Secretaries ==
1978: Javier Doz Orrit
1989: Fernando Lezcano
2004: José Campos
2013: Francísco García
