= Federation of Industry =

Spanish trade union

The Federation of Industry (Spanish: Federación de Industria, FI, also known as CC.OO de Industria) is a Spanish trade union representing workers in primary and manufacturing industries in Spain.

The union was founded in 2014, when the former Federation of Industry merged with the Federation of Textile, Leather, Chemical and Allied Industries. Like both its predecessors, it affiliated to the Workers' Commissions (CCOO). In June 2016, it absorbed the Federation of Agrifood. After the merger, it had 231,000 members, making it the largest affiliate of CCOO.

In October 2018, the union signed an agreement with Mango (retailer) to safeguard the rights of the workers that supply Mango's products around the world. In November 2024, the union coordinated an agreement with the Spanish Federation of Chemical Industry Businesses (FEIQUE) to establish salary increases, ensure commitment to quality employment and equal treatment. In September 2025, the union worked with cooperative Ajos Tierra de Barros to create an equality plan.

There are local branches of the union in each region of Spain, including Castilla-La Mancha, and further subdivisions as far as Ciudad Real.

== General Secretaries ==
2014-Jun 2021: Agustín Martín Martinez
Jun 2021-Apr 2025: Garbiñe Espejo
Apr 2025: Francisco San José
