= National Federation of Commerce =

The National Federation of Commerce (Spanish: Federación Estatal de Comercio) was a trade union representing workers in retail and related industries in Spain.

The union held its first congress in 1978, and affiliated to the Workers' Commissions. By 1981, it had 8,655 members, and by 1994, its membership had grown to 19,769. In 1996, it merged with the National Federation of Hotel and Tourism Workers, to form the National Federation of Trade, Hotels and Tourism.
