= National Federation of Chemicals =

Manufacturing workers trade union in Spain

- Federación Estatal de Químicas
- Formation: 1977
- Dissolved: 1993
- Merger of: Federation of Textile, Leather, Chemical and Allied Industries
- Location: Spain
- Members: 30,254 (1993)
- Parent organization: Workers' Commissions

The National Federation of Chemicals (Spanish: Federación Estatal de Quimicas) was a trade union representing workers in various manufacturing industries in Spain.

The union was founded in 1977, and affiliated to the Workers' Commissions. In 1981, workers in the glass and ceramics industries transferred over from the National Federation of Construction. By the end of the year, it had 19,913 members, and by 1993, its membership had grown to 30,254. That year, it merged with the National Federation of Textiles and Leather, to form the Federation of Textile, Leather, Chemical and Allied Industries.
