= Federation of Construction and Services =

The Federation of Construction and Services (Spanish: Federación de Construcción y Servicios, Hábitat) is a trade union representing workers in the construction and personal services sectors in Spain.

== History ==
The union was established in 2014, when the Federation of Private Services merged with the Federation of Construction, Wood and Related Industries. Like both its predecessors, it affiliated to the Workers' Commissions. Jesús Ángel Belvis was elected as its first general secretary.
