= National Federation of Hotel and Tourism Workers =

The National Federation of Hotel and Tourism Workers (Spanish: Federación Estatal de Hostelería, FEHT) was a trade union representing workers in the hospitality industry in Spain.

The union held its founding conference in 1978, and affiliated with the Workers' Commissions. It had 9,320 members by 1981, and its membership grew to 23,196 by 1994. In October 1996, it merged with the National Federation of Commerce, to form the National Federation of Trade, Hotels and Tourism.
