= National Federation of Trade, Hotels and Tourism =

- Federación Estatal de Comercio, Hostelería y Turismo
- Merged into: Federation of Services
- Founded: October 1996
- Dissolved: 15 July 2014
- Members: 43,340
- Affiliations: Workers' Commissions

The National Federation of Trade, Hotels and Tourism (Spanish: Federacion Estatal de Comercio, Hosteleria y Turismo, FECOHT) was a Spanish trade union representing hospitality and retail workers in Spain.

== History ==
The union was established in October 1996, when the National Federation of Commerce merged with the National Federation of Hotel and Tourism Workers. Like both its predecessors, it affiliated to the Workers' Commissions. On formation, it had 43,340 members. On 15 July 2014, it merged with the Federation of Financial and Administrative Services, to form the new Federation of Services.
