= Unai Sordo =

Spanish trade unionist (born 1972)

Sordo in 2025

Unai Sordo Calvo (born 2 October 1972) is a Spanish trade unionist. He was the secretary general of the Workers' Commissions (CCOO) in the Basque Country from 2009 to 2017, when he was elected national secretary general of the union.

== Early life ==
Sordo was born on 2 October 1972 in Barakaldo, in the Basque Country. He is from the Uribarri neighbourhood of Bilbao, but the hospital in the neighbouring city was the closest public one at the time. His family was originally from Valladolid, and at secondary school he aligned to the left, but not the Basque nationalist abertzale left. During the protests against Spain's admission to NATO in 1986, he took to school a placard against the "wedding" of Felipe González and Ronald Reagan. He graduated in labour relations from the University of the Basque Country and worked in woodworking.

== Career ==
Sordo was elected the youth secretary of the branch of the Workers' Commissions (CCOO) in the Basque Country, and its organisation in the province of Biscay, in June 2000. In 2004, he became its leader in Biscay. In 2009, he was elected secretary general of the CCOO in the Basque Country, and was re-elected with 96% of the votes in 2013.

In July 2017, Sordo received 88.8% of the eligible votes to become national secretary general of the CCOO. He was re-elected with 93.74% of the votes in October 2021. In June 2025, with 96% of the votes, he was elected to a third and final term.

Sordo was discussed as a possible candidate to lead the Broad Front in the 2026 Spanish general election. In March 2026, he dismissed the speculation on Cadena SER, saying that he would fulfill his term as secretary general of the CCOO. On 5 October, he and Pepe Álvarez, his counterpart from the Unión General de Trabajadores, announced a 24-hour general strike, their first since 2012. The strike was for the issues of salaries and housing.
