= National Federation of Textiles and Leather =

Textile and clothing trade unions

The National Federation of Textiles and Leather (Spanish: Federación Estatal del Textil-Piel) was a trade union representing workers in the textile, clothing and leather industries in Spain.

The union was established in 1984, when the National Federation of Textiles merged with the National Federation of Leather. Like both its predecessors, it affiliated to the Workers' Commissions. On formation, it had 24,048 members, and by 1993 this figure had fallen slightly, to 22,657. In 1994, it merged with the National Federation of Chemicals, to form the Federation of Textile, Leather, Chemical and Allied Industries.
