= Federation of Metalworkers and Miners =

Spanish mining trade union

The Federation of Metalworkers and Miners (Spanish: Federación de Minero-Metal, FM) was a Spanish trade union representing workers in the mining and metalworking industries in Spain.

== History ==
The union was founded in 1993, when the Federation of Metal merged with the National Federation of Mining. Like both its predecessors, it affiliated to the Workers' Commissions (CCOO). It was the largest affiliate of CCOO, and in 1994 it had 124,020 members. In 1998, it absorbed the Federation of Energy, and in 2009 the union was renamed as the Federation of Industry. In 2014, it merged with the Federation of Textile, Leather, Chemical and Allied Industries, to form a new Federation of Industry.

== General Secretaries ==
1993: Ignacio Fernández Toxo
2009: Felipe López Alonso
2013: Agustín Martín Martinez
