= Federation of Agrifood =

Trade union in Spain

The Federation of Agrifood (Spanish: Federación Agroalimentaria, FEAGRA) was a trade union representing workers in food production and processing in Spain.

The union was established in 2000, when the Federation of Food Processing merged with the Federation of Agriculture. Like both its predecessors, it affiliated to the Workers' Commissions. In 2016, it merged into the Federation of Industry.
