= Rudy De Leeuw =

Belgian trade unionist

Rudy De Leeuw (born 5 August 1953) is a retired Belgian trade union leader.

Born in Ninove, De Leeuw studied at KU Leuven before becoming a teacher. Initially, he was broadly sympathetic to the Marxist–Leninist Communist Party of Belgium, although he never joined the party. He later joined the Belgian Socialist Party and was elected as a local councillor. In 1983, he began working at the training institute of the General Labour Federation of Belgium (ABVV).

De Leeuw gradually rose to prominence in the ABVV, becoming successively an economic advisor in its business department, director of its management and finance department, and Flemish federal secretary, before being elected as president in 2006. In 2015, De Leeuw was additionally elected as president of the European Trade Union Confederation. In 2016, he published the book Ongelijkspel. He retired from the ABVV in 2018.

Trade union offices
Preceded by André Mordant	President of the General Labour Federation of Belgium; 2006–2018	Succeeded by Robert Vertenueil
Preceded by Ignacio Fernández Toxo	President of the European Trade Union Confederation; 2015–2019	Succeeded by Laurent Berger
