= Federation of Paper, Graphic Arts, Communications and Entertainment =

The Federation of Paper, Graphic Arts, Communications and Entertainment (Spanish: Federación de Papel, Artes Gráficas, Comunicación y Espectáculos, FESPACE) was a trade union representing workers in the media and entertainment industries in Spain.

The union was founded in 1994, when the National Federation of Graphic Arts merged with the National Federation of Entertainment. Like both its predecessors, it affiliated to the Workers' Commissions, and on formation, it had 13,903 members. In 1997, it merged with the Federation of Transport, Communication and Sea, to form the Federation of Communication and Transport.
