= Federation of Construction and Woodworkers =

The Federation of Construction and Woodworkers (Spanish: Federación Estatal de Construcción, Madera y Afines, FECOMA) was a trade union representing workers in the building and woodworking industries in Spain.

The union was founded in 1984, when the National Federation of Construction merged with the National Federation of Wood. Like both its predecessors, it affiliated to the Workers' Commissions. By 1994, it had 44,581 members. In 2014, it merged with the Federation of Private Services, to form the Federation of Construction and Services.
