= Federation of Public Administration Employees =

The Federation of Public Administration Employees (Spanish: Federación Sindical de Administración Publica, FSAP) was a trade union representing public sector administrative workers in Spain.

The union was established in 1977, and it affiliated to the Workers' Commissions. By 1981, it had 5,444 members, and by 1994, its membership had grown to 63,519. In 2009, it merged with the Federation of Communication and Transport, to form the Federation of Citizens' Services.
