= Marcelino Camacho =

Spanish trade unionist and politician (1918–2010)

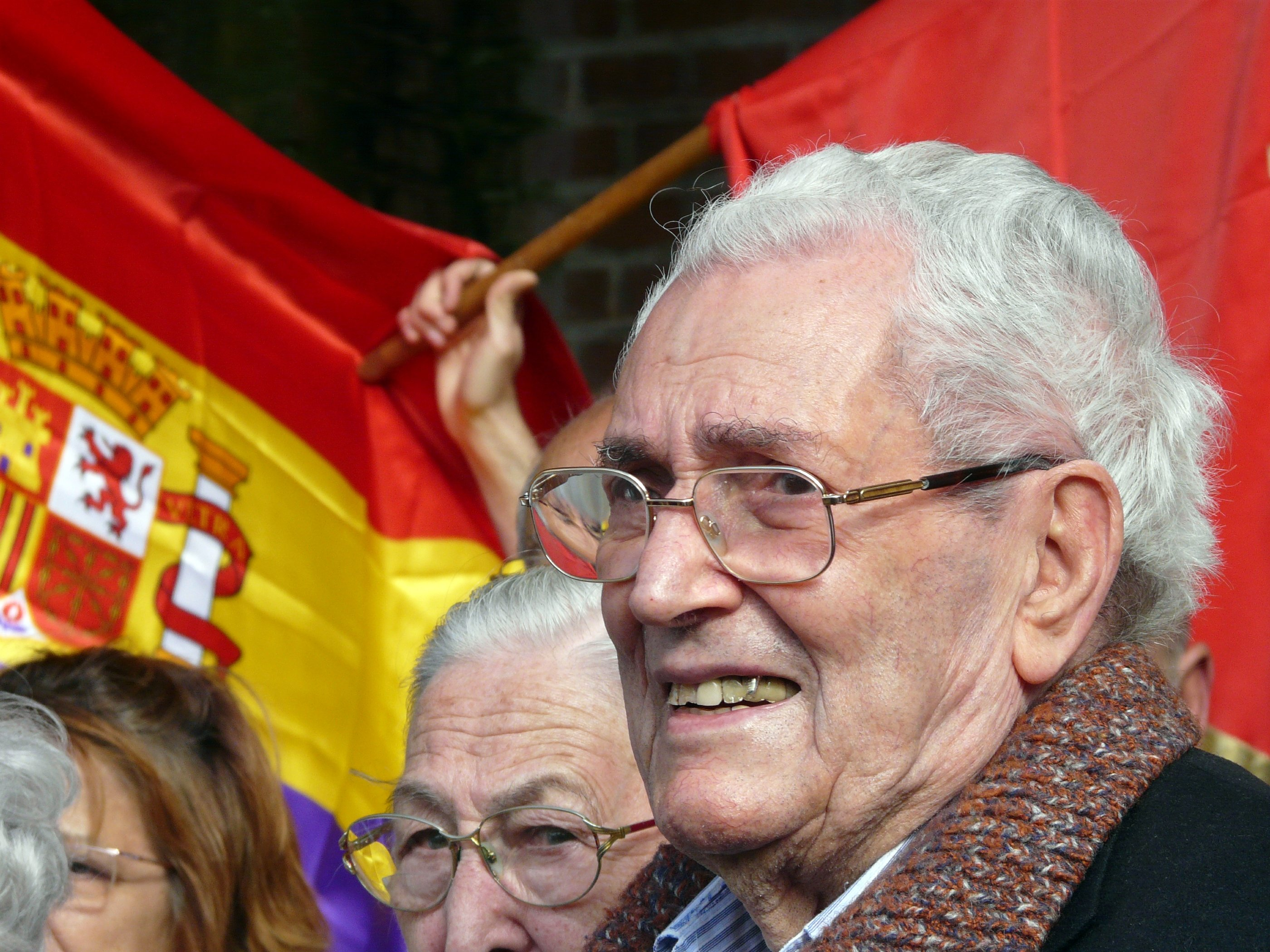

Member of the Congress of Deputies
- In office 13 July 1977 – 10 February 1981
- Constituency: Madrid

Personal details
- Born: January 21, 1918 Province of Soria, Spain
- Died: 29 October 2010 (aged 92) Madrid, Spain
- Spouse: Josefina Samper
- Occupation: Politician, trade unionist
- Known for: Founder and first Secretary-General of CCOO., PCE, Deputy

Marcelino Camacho Abad (January 21, 1918 – October 29, 2010) was a Spanish trade unionist and politician. He was a founding member of Comisiones Obreras (CCOO) and its first Secretary-General, holding this position between 1976 and 1987, and a communist deputy for Madrid Province between 1977 and 1981.

== Early life ==
Born the son of a unionized signalman in the village of Osma, Soria, Spain, Camacho was familiar with socialist positions from a young age. In 1935, he joined the Communist Party of Spain (PCE), its Youth Organization and the General Workers' Union.

== Military career ==
During the Spanish Civil War, Camacho was a private in the Spanish Republican Army on the Central and Southern fronts. He was captured by the Francoist forces at the end of the war in 1939, and sentenced to serve forced labor in a penal battalion in Spanish Morocco.

In 1944 Camacho, along with other prisoners, managed to escape to Oran (in French Algeria), where there was an active colony of Spanish exiles. There he joined the local cell of the Spanish Unified Socialist Youth, where he met his wife Josefina Samper. He was trained as a mill operator, and joined the General Confederation of Labour.

== Political life ==
In 1957, he returned to Spain with his family and started working in the Madrid factory of Perkins Engines. Camacho was active in a trade union campaign, creating an anti-Francoist workers' commission to infiltrate the Francoist Spanish Trade Union Organisation. This work resulted in Camacho being elected to the Regional Metal Workers' Commission, the first stable embryo of what would become the CCOO trade union. From 1966 until 1972 he was imprisoned in Carabanchel prison. Shortly after release he was rearrested, under Public Order Court Process 1001, along with nine other leaders of CCOO and the Communist Party of Spain. During that period Marcelino Camacho conducted several protests in jail, including hunger strikes. In 1975, Camacho was released, benefiting from a Royal Amnesty proclaimed by King Juan Carlos I.

In 1976, Marcelino Camacho was elected to the Executive Committee of the Communist Party of Spain, and shortly after that he was elected the first Secretary-General of CCOO. In the 1977 elections Camacho stood second in the PCE list for Madrid to the Congress of Deputies and was elected.

During his tenure as General Secretary of CCOO, Camacho oversaw the support of the union to the Spanish Constitution of 1978, the signing of the Moncloa Agreements, and the first General Strike called in Spain after the restoration of democracy in 1985. During that time CCOO became the leading Trade Union in Spain, by membership and by number of workers' representatives.

As a deputy he represented the Communist Parliamentary Group in labor issues, most importantly leading the group's rejection of the code of labor. In 1981, Camacho resigned his seat in Congress to dedicate himself to his trade union position.

In 1987, Camacho was succeeded by Antonio Gutierrez as Secretary General of CCOO, remaining as Honorary President for the next nine years.

=== Retirement ===
After his retirement Camacho remained active in politics and trade unionism as a member of the Confederal Council of CCOO and of the Central Committee of the PCE, as well as the Federal Council of United Left, until just a few years before his death. He died in 2010 in Madrid.
