= Federation of Communication and Transport =

The Federation of Communication and Transport (Spanish: Federación de Comunicaciones y Transportes, FCT) was a trade union representing workers in the communication and transportation industries in Spain.

The union was founded in 1997, when the Federation of Transport, Communication and Sea merged with the Federation of Paper, Graphic Arts, Communications and Entertainment. Like both its predecessors, it affiliated to the Workers' Commissions. In 2009, it merged with the Federation of Public Administration Employees, to form the Federation of Citizens' Services.
