= Federation of Food Processing =

The Federation of Food Processing (Spanish: Federación Estatal de Alimentación, FAYT) was a trade union representing workers in the food processing sector in Spain.

The union was founded in 1977, as an affiliate of the Workers' Commissions. By 1981, it had 21,511 members, and as of 1994 its membership had grown to 31,625. In 2000, it merged with the Federation of Agriculture, to form the Federation of Agrifood.
