= Federation of Financial and Administrative Services =

Trade union in Spain

The Federation of Financial and Administrative Services (Spanish: Federación de Servicios Financieros y Administrativos, COMFIA) was a trade union representing white collar workers in Spain.

The union was founded in 1997, when the Federation of Banking and Savings merged with the National Federation of Insurance. Like both its predecessors, it affiliated to the Workers' Commissions. In 2014, it merged with the National Federation of Trade, Hotels and Tourism, to form the Federation of Services
