= Federation of Textile, Leather, Chemical and Allied Industries =

Trade union of manufacturing industries in Spain

The Federation of Textile, Leather, Chemical and Allied Industries (Spanish: Federación Estatal de Industría Textil-Piel, Quimica y Afines, FITEQA) was a trade union representing workers in manufacturing industries in Spain.

The union was founded in 1994, when the National Federation of Textiles and Leather merged with the National Federation of Chemicals. Like both its predecessors, the union affiliated to the Workers' Commissions, and by the end of the year, it had 51,053 members. In 2014, it merged with the Federation of Industry, to form a new Federation of Industry.
