= Wanja Lundby-Wedin =

Swedish trade unionist

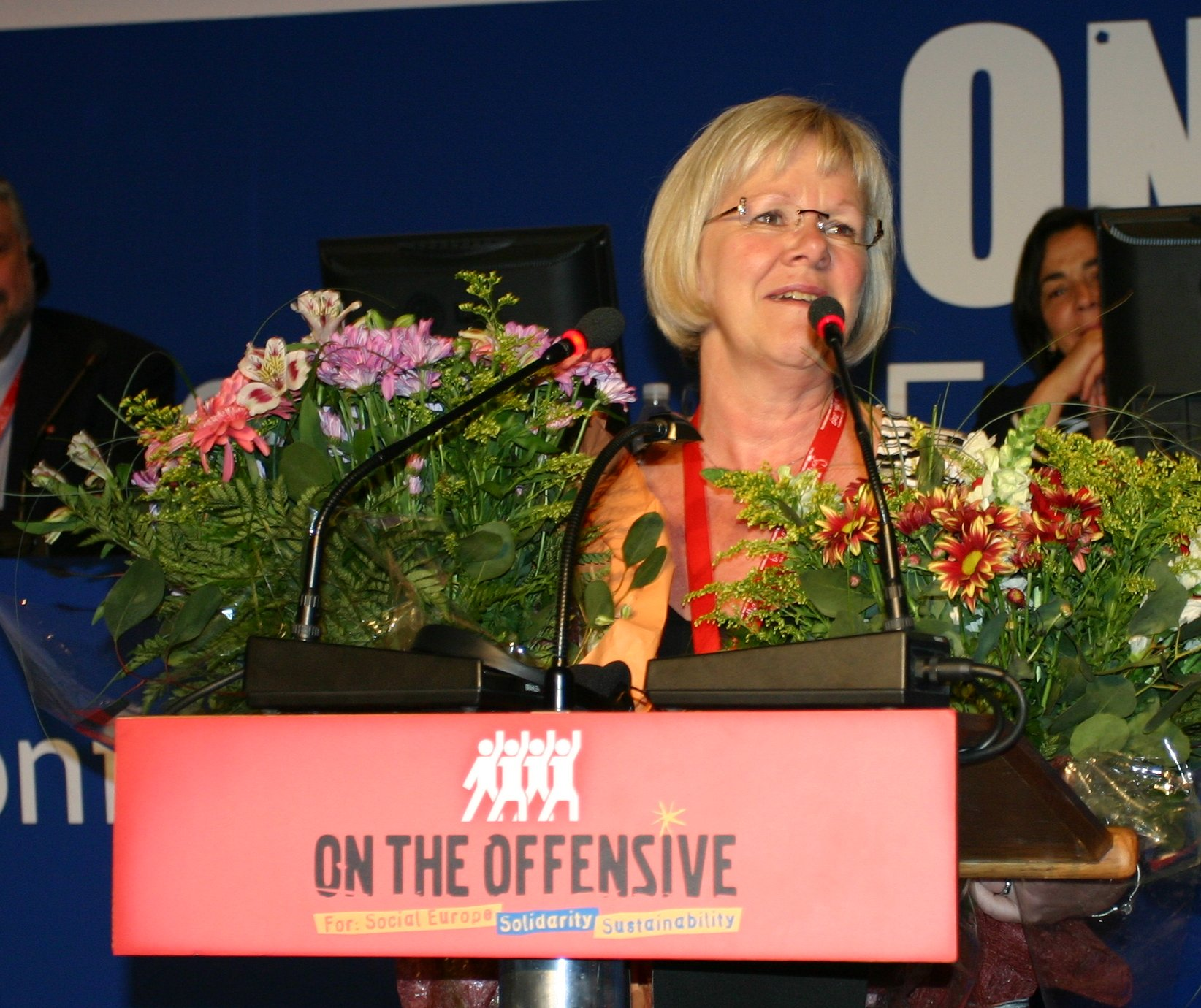
- Wanja Lundby-Wedin after being elected President of the European Trade Union Confederation in May 2007
- Born: 19 October 1952 (age 73); Stockholm, Sweden
- Occupations: Nurse, trade union leader.
- Political party: Swedish Social Democratic Party
- Spouse: Lennart Wedin

Wanja Elisabeth Lundby-Wedin (born 19 October 1952) was the President of the Swedish Trade Union Confederation (Swedish: Landsorganisationen i Sverige or LO) from 2000 to 2012. From May 2007 until May 2011, she was the President of the European Trade Union Confederation.

== Career ==
=== Trade union career ===
After having worked as a nursing auxiliary at Högdalen hospital in southern Stockholm, Lundby-Wedin studied to become assistant nurse, and started to work at Danderyd hospital north of Stockholm. There, she got her first trade union assignment, as union liaison officer for the Swedish Municipal Workers' Union. In 1981 she was employed as union representative at the Stockholm branch of the union, and in 1987 she became Head of the Department for Environmental Issues at its national headquarters. In 1994 she became Vice President of the Swedish Trade Union Confederation and at the confederation's congress in September 2000 she was elected President, thereby becoming the first women on that post.

=== President of the ETUC ===
On 25 May 2007 Wanja Lundby-Wedin was elected the President of the European Trade Union Confederation, ETUC. She thus became the first female president of the ETUC as well as the first ETUC president from Sweden. In her acceptance speech she emphasised her support for solid welfare systems and criticised the migration and refugee policy of the European Union.

=== Role in the Social Democratic party ===
In the capacity of President of the Swedish Trade Union Confederation, Lundby-Wedin is also a member of the Executive of the Social Democratic Party. In 2006, she was mentioned in the media as one of the possible candidates to lead the party after Göran Persson resigned the party leadership following the defeat in the 2006 parliamentary election. She did not show any public interest in the post, and told journalists she considered Mona Sahlin, who later received the post, a good candidate, although she refused to name a favourite. In the final months before the leadership election her name was no longer generally mentioned in the discussion.

== Personal life ==
Lundby-Wedin is married and has two children.

Trade union offices
| Preceded by Bertil Jonsson | President of the Swedish Trade Union Confederation; 2000—2012 | Succeeded by Karl-Petter Thorwaldsson |
| Preceded by Cándido Méndez Rodríguez | President of the European Trade Union Confederation; 2007—2011 | Succeeded by Ignacio Fernández Toxo |
