= Federation of Metal =

Trade union of metalworkers in Spain

The Federation of Metal (Spanish: Federación del Metal) was a Spanish trade union representing metalworkers in Spain.

The union was founded in December 1976 and affiliated to the Workers' Commissions. The federation's largest affiliate, it had 103,161 members by 1981, and 113,871 in 1993. Later that year, it merged with the National Federation of Mining, to form the Federation of Metalworkers and Miners.

== General Secretaries ==
1977: Adolfo Pinedo
1981: Juan Ignacio Marín
1987: Ignacio Fernández Toxo
