= Fondón =

Fondón, Spain
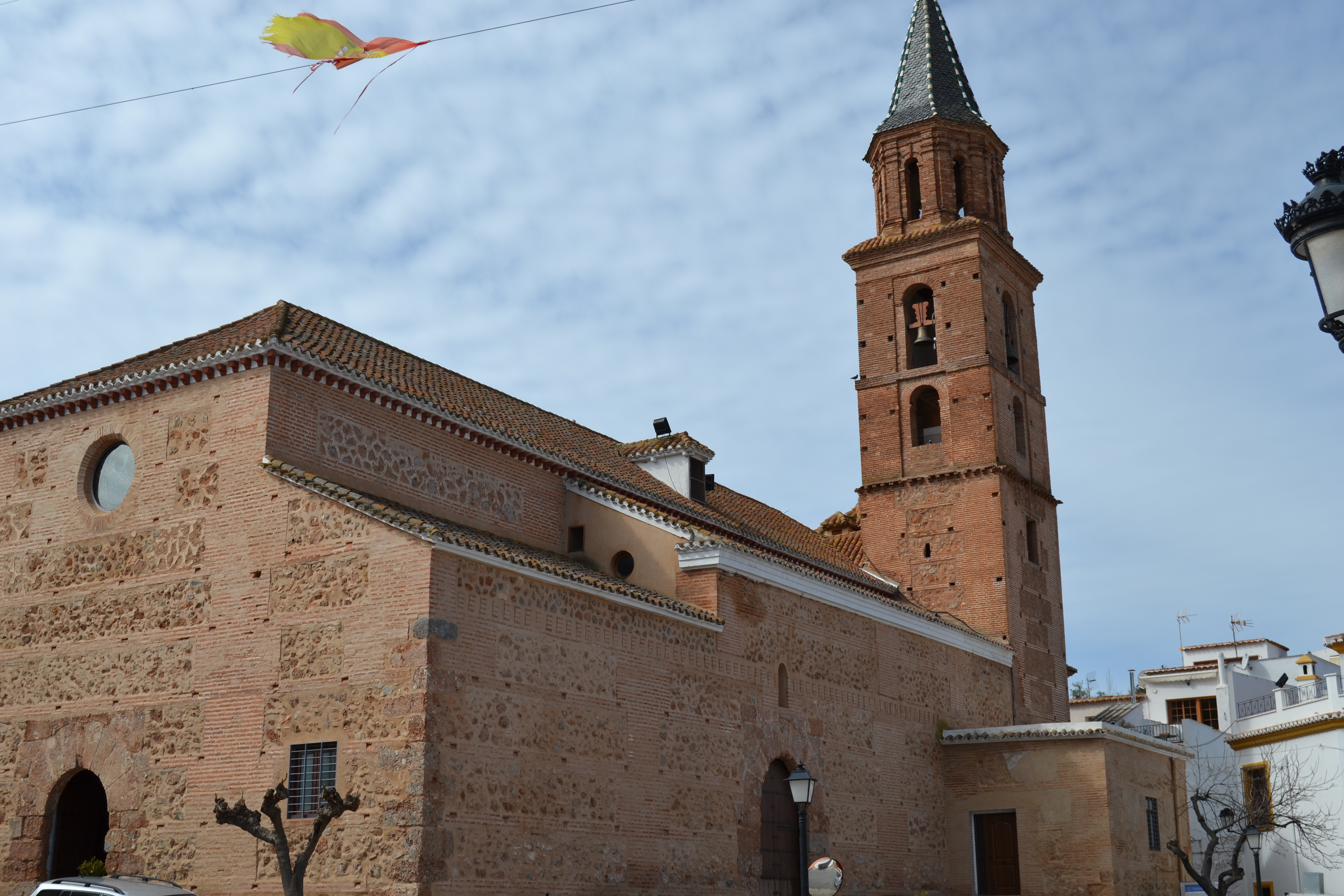
- Church of Fondón

- Flag Coat of arms
- Interactive map of Fondón, Spain
- Coordinates: 36°59′N 2°51′W
- Country: Spain
- Community: Andalusia
- Municipality: Almería

Government
  - Mayor: Joaquín Fresneda López (PSOE)

Area
  - Total: 92 km^{2} (36 sq mi)
- Elevation: 846 m (2,776 ft)

Population (2025-01-01)
  - Total: 1,152
  - Density: 13/km^{2} (32/sq mi)
- Time zone: UTC+1 (CET)
  - Summer (DST): UTC+2 (CEST)

Fondón is a municipality of Almería province, in the autonomous community of Andalusia, Spain. It has an area of 92 km^{2}.

== Demographics ==
Historical population
Year	Pop.	±%
1999	926	—
2000	943	+1.8%
2001	957	+1.5%
2002	951	−0.6%
2003	943	−0.8%
2004	946	+0.3%
2005	934	−1.3%

== See also ==
- List of municipalities in Almería
