= Ignacio Urquizu =

Spanish politician

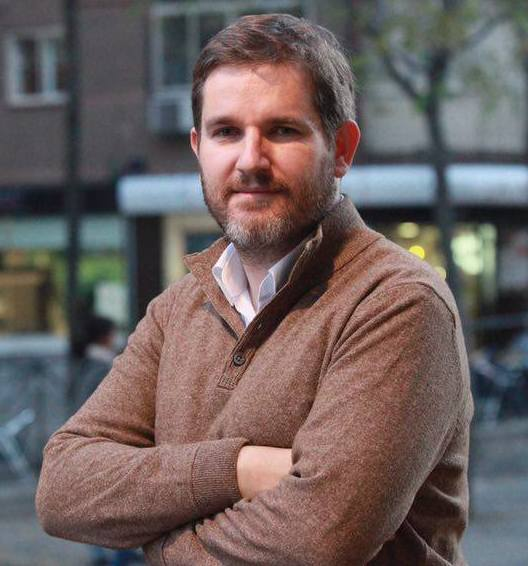

Member of the Congress of Deputies
- In office 13 January 2016 – 21 May 2019
- Constituency: Teruel

Personal details
- Born: 21 November 1978 (age 47) Alcañiz, Spain
- Party: Spanish Socialist Workers' Party

Ignacio Urquizu Sancho (born 21 November 1978) is a Spanish politician and sociologist. He was a member of the 12th term of the Congress of Deputies.
