= Federation of Services (Spain) =

Trade union for service sector workers

The Federation of Services (Spanish: Federación de Servicios) is a trade union representing workers in the service sector in Spain.

The union was established on 15 July 2014, when the Federation of Financial and Administrative Services merged with the National Federation of Trade, Hotels and Tourism. Like both its predecessors, it affiliated to the Workers' Commissions.
