= Workers' Commissions =

Spanish trade union

CCOO
- Workers' Commissions
- Comisiones Obreras
- Logo
- Founded: 1976
- Headquarters: Madrid, Spain
- Location: Spain
- Members: 920,870 (2018); 94,971 union representatives (2018).
- Key people: Unai Sordo, general secretary
- Affiliations: International Trade Union Confederation; European Trade Union Confederation
- Website: www.ccoo.es

CC.OO. sticker

The Workers' Commissions (Spanish: Comisiones Obreras, CCOO) since the 1970s has become the largest trade union in Spain. It has more than one million members, and is the most successful union in labor elections, competing with the Unión General de Trabajadores (UGT), which is historically affiliated with the Spanish Socialist Workers' Party (PSOE), and with the anarcho-syndicalist Confederación General del Trabajo (CGT), which is usually a distant third.

The CCOO were organized in the 1960s by the Communist Party of Spain (PCE) and workers' Roman Catholic groups to fight against Francoist Spain, and for labor rights (in opposition to the non-representative "vertical unions" in the Spanish Labour Organization). The various organizations formed a single entity after a 1976 Congress in Barcelona.

Along with other unions like the Unión Sindical Obrera (USO) and the UGT, it called a general strike in 1976, and carried out protests against the conditions in the country. Marcelino Camacho, a major figure of Spanish trade unionism and a PCE member, was CCOO's General Secretary from its foundation to 1985 - he was elected to the Congress of Deputies in the 1977 election. However, CCOO disassociated from the PCE in the early 1990s and is nowadays a non-partisan, negotiation-prone union.

== History ==
=== Birth and role in Francoist Spain ===
Taking as reference the clandestine union Oposición Sindical Obrera (OSO) the first workers' commissions were organized during 1960 in Asturias, Catalonia, Madrid and the Basque provinces of Gipuzkoa and Bizkaia as labor disputes emerged outside the Francoist national-syndical movement. Originally the "commissions" were representative bodies of workers elected in assemblies. The first "comisiones" were boosted by the Communist Party of Spain (PCE), Christian labor movements (JOC and HOAC) and other groups opposed to the Spanish State. Gradually the ad hoc commissions started to become permanent, creating a stable and well organized movement.

For many historians, one of the first places where the Workers' Commissions were formed was the valley of Laciana (province of León), within the Minero Siderurgica de Ponferrada (MSP) industry. Another place that sometimes is also cited as the first is La Camocha mine (Gijón) in 1957, during a strike. The Asturian miners' strike of 1962 ("La Huelgona") was the first massive action of the union and one of the first massive popular mobilizations against Francoist Spain.

The union was heavily repressed in Spain. In 1972 all the leadership of CCOO was jailed, being judged in the infamous Proceso 1001. They remained imprisoned until the trial, more than a year later. This finally took place on 20 (day that coincided with the assassination of Prime Minister Luis Carrero Blanco, which led to the suspension of the trial for a few hours), 21 and 22 December 1973. The defendants faced the accusation of belonging to an illegal and subversive organization, and of having links with the Communist Party of Spain (PCE). On December 30 convictions were announced, which coincided with requests of the prosecutor and whose severity was considered related to the murder of Carrero Blanco. The convictions were the following: Marcelino Camacho, 20 years of jail; Nicolás Sartorius, 19; Miguel Ángel Zamora Antón, 12; Pedro Santiesteban, 12; Eduardo Saborido, 20; Francisco García Salve, 19; Luis Fernández, 12; Francisco Acosta, 12; Juan Muñiz Zapico Juanín, 18; and Fernando Soto Martín, 17. They were amnestied on 25 November 1975.

The tactic of CCOO was entryism, i.e.: infiltration in the Vertical Unions of Francoism. This tactic culminated in the union elections of 1975, where CCOO got the overwhelming majority of the delegates elected in the major companies in the country. CCOO led numerous strikes and labor mobilizations in late Francoism and the Spanish Transition.

=== Transition and 1980s ===
Since the democratic transition until 1987 its secretary general was the historic union leader Marcelino Camacho, also a prominent leader of the PCE and deputy between 1977 and 1981. In 1976 CCOO held the Assembly of Barcelona, where the modern class trade union confederation was formed. CCOO was legalized on 27 April 1977. The murder of 5 labor lawyers in 1977 (members of the union and the PCE) in Madrid that year was followed by a massive funeral, more than 250,000 people participated, and the strikes that followed helped the legalization of the organization. In those years the union is growing rapidly in membership, like the rest of unions and leftist parties. From 1976 to 1978, CCOO went from 30,000 to 1,823,907 members. However, after the signing of the Moncloa Pacts, this figure gradually begun to descend, passing to 702,367 in 1981 and 332,019 in 1986. This negative trend in membership started to change since 1987. In those years CCOO also suffered various splits. In 1976 the Confederación de Sindicatos Unitarios de Trabajadores (CSUT), a group of CCOO members affiliated with the Party of Labour of Spain (PTE) split from the organization. In May 1977 CCOO suffered another split, this time from supporters of the maoist Workers' Revolutionary Organisation (ORT), that formed the Sindicato Unitario.

The year after legalization in 1978, CCOO held its I Confederal Congress, where Marcelino Camacho was reelected, what would happen again in the Second (1981) and III (1984) congresses. CCOO also was the most voted union (37.8% of the representatives) in the workers representative elections of 1978, the first democratic ones in the history of Spain. In this last congress, different factions emerged, including a majority linked to PCE (led by Marcelino Camacho) and three minorities, respectively linked to the Workers' Party of Spain – Communist Unity (PTE-UC) (called carrillistas and led by Julián Ariza); the Communist Party of the Peoples of Spain (PCPE); and the Revolutionary Communist League and the Communist Movement (known as Izquierda Sindical). In 1980, CCOO received an important part of the USO members, that belonged to the socialist self-management current. In 1986 the union participated in the historical mobilizations against the permanence of Spain in NATO. CCOO asked for a "NO" vote in the NATO referendum.

CCOO called 4 general strikes in the government of Felipe González: 1985, 1988, 1992 and 1994; against the economic and employment policy of the PSOE government. Especially massive and historic was the 1988 Spanish general strike, organized jointly with the UGT, which had a 95% of following, and forced the government to totally withdraw the Youth Employment Plan.

=== 90s to today ===
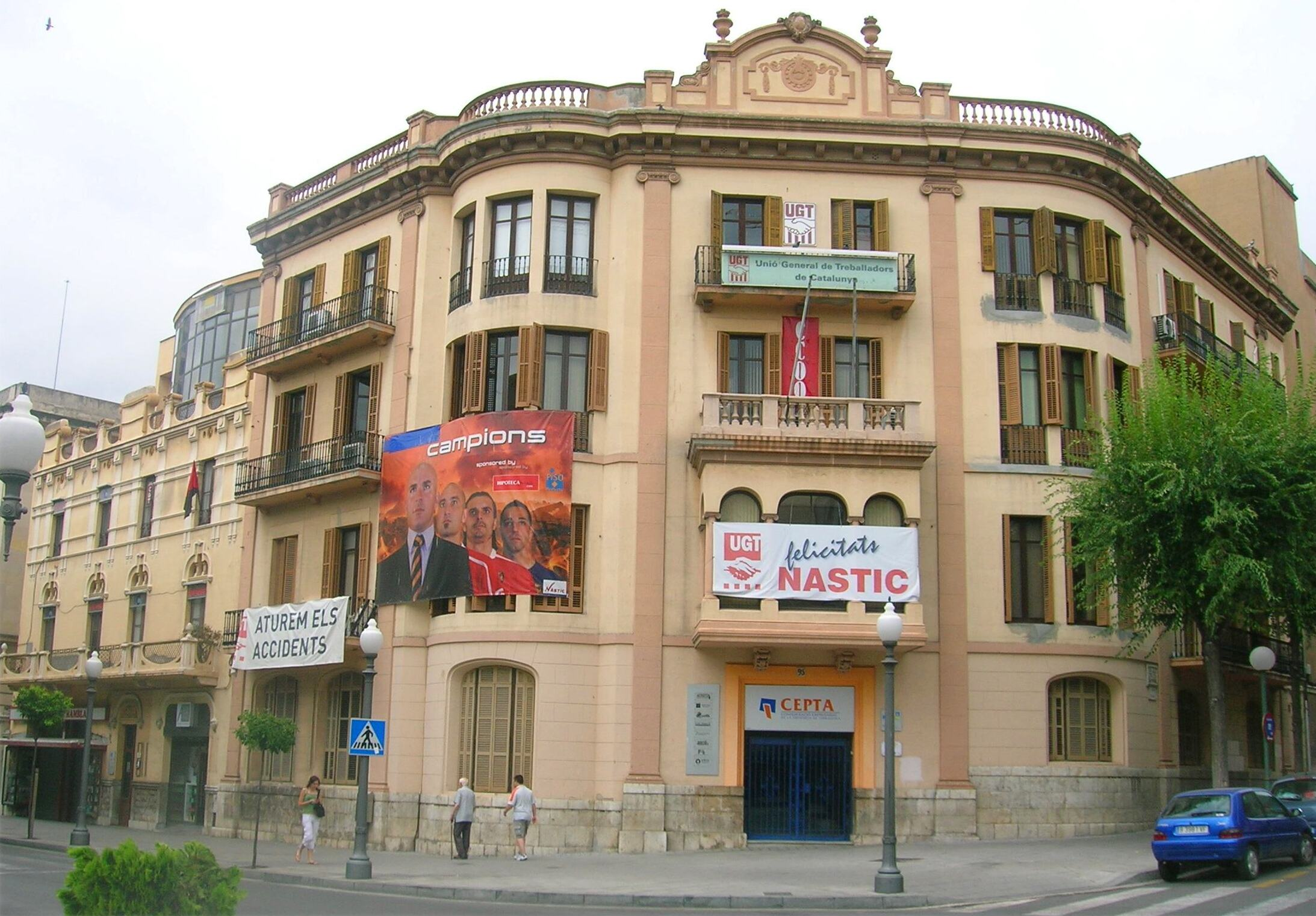
Headquarters of CCOO and other unions in Tarragona.

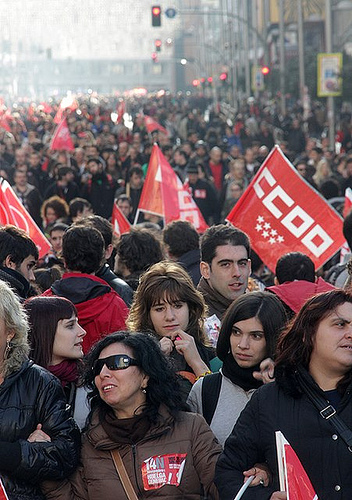
General strike on November 14, 2012, in Madrid.

Since the Fourth Congress (1987), the union's general secretary was Antonio Gutiérrez, reelected in the V Congress (1991). During his mandate CCOO distanced itself from the PCE and a preference for negotiations and the social pacts over strikes and conflictivity was promoted. This was criticized by a faction known as the Critical Sector of CCOO, supported by Marcelino Camacho and Agustin Moreno, in the sixth Congress (1996). The Critical Sector of CCOO has continued to organize the most pro-PCE sector of CCOO since then.

In the VII Congress (2000) José Maria Fidalgo was chosen as the new secretary general, being re-elected at the Eighth Congress in April 2004. In 2002 CCOO and UGT called for a general strike against a decree of the government of José María Aznar that made firings cheaper, eliminated agricultural subsidies and encouraged job insecurity, known as the decretazo. After protests the measure was withdrawn almost entirely. In this cycle CCOO reached again over one million members. CCOO also opposed the Iraq War and participated in the massive protests against it.

CCOO held its IX Confederal Congress in December 2008, with 1.2 million members and 120,000 elected delegates in the workplaces of Spain at the time. At the Ninth Congress Ignacio Fernández Toxo was elected general secretary, surpassing by 28 votes José María Fidalgo.

== General Secretary ==
Between 1987 and 2000, the union's general secretary was Antonio Gutiérrez; he was followed by José María Fidalgo (1997–2009), often criticized by the left wing of the union. The CCOO and the UGT, summoned three general strikes (1988, 1992 and 1994) against the economic policy of the Felipe González government, and one on June 20, 2002, against the government of José María Aznar and its plan to change the unemployment insurance system.

The current General Secretary is Ignacio Fernández Toxo. On September 29, 2010, the CCOO called a general strike to protest the José Luis Rodríguez Zapatero government's plans to raise the retirement age and cut spending.

Tenure	Name
1976–1987	Marcelino Camacho
1987–2000	Antonio Gutiérrez
2000–2008	José María Fidalgo
2008–2017	Ignacio Fernández Toxo
2017–present	Unai Sordo

== Organization ==
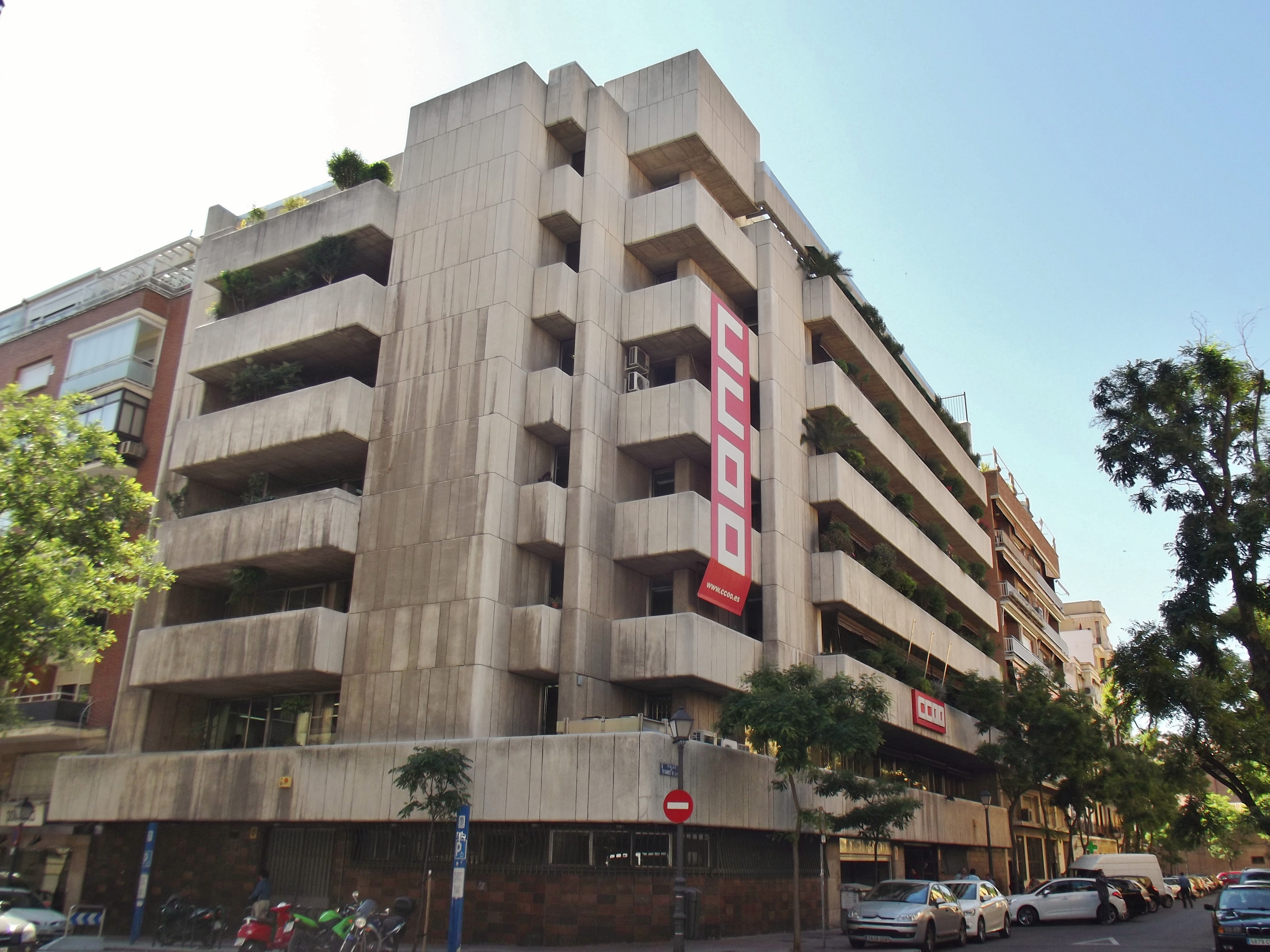
CCOO headquarters, Madrid.

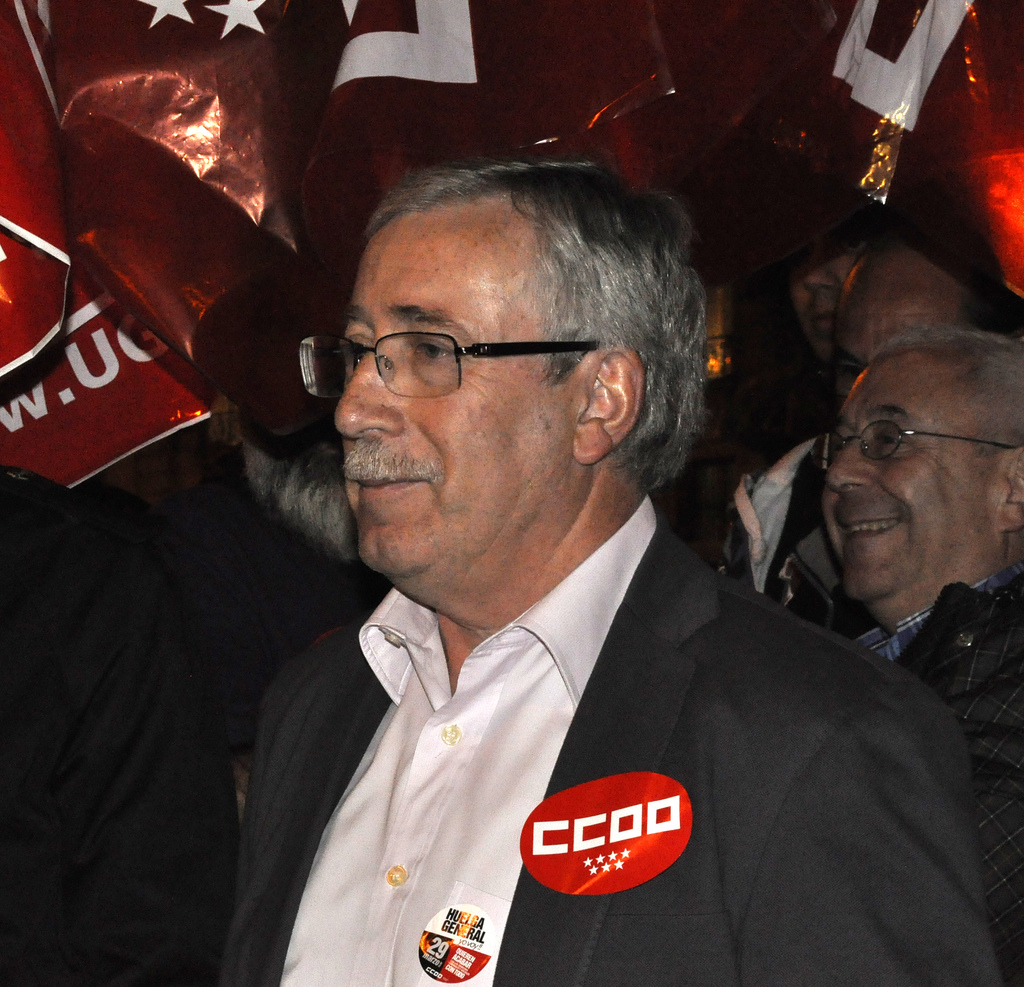
Ignacio Fernández Toxo (2012)

CCOO is organized territorially in local, provincial, regional/nationality levels (in regional unions or in nationality confederations) and in a Spain-wide level. Equally and in a parallel way CCOO is organized at the sectoral level, from local unions in a company to the federal branch. The decision-making bodies at the federal level are the Confederal Congress, the Confederal Council and the Confederal Executive Committee.

=== Current affiliates ===
Branch federations are:

Union	Abbreviation	Founded
Federation of Citizens' Services	FSC	2009
Federation of Construction and Services	FCS	2014
Federation of Education	FE	1978
Federation of Health and Social Health	FSS	1977
Federation of Industry	FI	2014
Federation of Services	Servicios	2014
Pensioners and Senior Citizens Federation	FPJ	1978

=== Former affiliates ===
Union	Abbreviation	Founded	Left	Reason not affiliated	Membership (1981)	Membership (1994)
Federation of Agriculture	FECAMPO	1977	2000	Merged into FEAGRA	15,689	17,899
Federation of Agrifood	FEAGRA	2000	2016	Merged into FI	N/A	N/A
Federation of Banking and Savings	FEBA	1976	1997	Merged into COMFIA	7,868	31,863
Federation of Communication and Transport	FCT	1997	2009	Merged into FSC	N/A	N/A
Federation of Construction and Woodworkers	FECOMA	1984	2014	Merged into FCS	N/A	44,581
Federation of Energy			1998	Merged into FM	6,057	8,754
Federation of Financial and Administrative Services	COMFIA	1997	2014	Merged into Servicios	N/A	N/A
Federation of Food Processing	FAYT	1977	2000	Merged into FEAGRA	21,511	31,625
Federation of Metal		1976	1993	Merged into FM	103,161	N/A
Federation of Metalworkers and Miners	FM	1993	2014	Merged into FI	N/A	124,020
Federation of Paper, Graphic Arts, Communications and Entertainment	FESPACE	1994	1997	Merged into FCT	N/A	13,903
Federation of Private Services	FSP	1984	2014	Merged into FCS	N/A	31,681
Federation of Public Administration Employees	FSAP	1977	2009	Merged into FSC	5,444	63,519
Federation of the Sea			1987	Merged into FETCOMAR	N/A	N/A
Federation of Textile, Leather, Chemical and Allied Industries	FITEQA	1994	2014	Merged into FI	N/A	51,053
Federation of Transport and Communications	FTC	1978	1987	Merged into FETCOMAR	36,092	N/A
Federation of Transport, Communication and Sea	FETCOMAR	1987	1997	Merged into FCT	N/A	74,361
Federation of the Unemployed					1,778	10,574
National Federation of Chemicals		1977	1994	Merged into FITEQA	19,913	N/A
National Federation of Commerce		1978	1996	Merged into FECOHT	8,655	19,769
National Federation of Construction		1977	1984	Merged into FECOMA	43,745	N/A
National Federation of Entertainment		1977	1994	Merged into FESPACE	917	N/A
National Federation of Graphic Arts		1977	1994	Merged into FESPACE	9,357	N/A
National Federation of Hotel and Tourism Workers	FEHT	1978	1996	Merged into FECOHT	9,320	23,196
National Federation of Insurance	FES	1977	1997	Merged into COMFIA	1,129	2,913
National Federation of Leather			1984		9,111	N/A
National Federation of Mining		1976	1993	Merged into FM	15,118	N/A
National Federation of Textiles			1984		17,646	N/A
National Federation of Textiles and Leather		1984	1994	Merged into FITEQA	N/A	N/A
National Federation of Trade, Hotels and Tourism	FECOHT	1996	2014	Merged into Servicios	N/A	N/A
National Federation of Wood			1984	Merged into FECOMA	14,451	N/A

=== Confederal Executive Committee ===
- Secretary of Social Protection and Public Policy: Carlos Bravo Fernández
- Secretary of Institutional Participation: Francisco Carbonero Cantador
- Secretary of Finance, Administration & Services Mary Cardeñosa Peñas
- Secretary of Trade Union Action: Mercedes Gonzalez Calvo
- Secretary of Women and Equality: Elena Blasco Martín
- Secretary of Organization: Fernando Lezcano López
- Secretary of Occupational Health: Pedro Jose Linares Rodríguez
- Secretary of Training for Trade Union Education and Labour Culture: José Luis Gonzalez
- Secretary of Communication: Empar Pablo Martínez
- Secretary of Environment and Mocility: Mariano Sanz Lubeiro
- Secretary of Membership, Services and Counseling: Francisca Goméz Sanchez
- International and Cooperation Secretariat: Cristina Faciaben Lacorte
- Social movements and networks Secretariat: Paula Guisande Boronat
- Youth and new labour realities Secretariat: Carlos Gutiérrez Calderón

== Internal currents ==
There are 3 internal currents in CCOO:

- Confederal Majority: sector linked to the latest confederal directions. Has a clear majority in 19 organizations: Citizen Services, Industry, Health, Trade and Hospitality, Financial and Administrative Services, Education, Textile and Chemical Industries; and territorial organizations of Cantabria, Ceuta, Basque Autonomous Community, Navarra, Catalonia, Galiza, Castilla y León, Valencian Country, Andalusia, Extremadura and Región de Murcia. In the last Congress it was divided among supporters of José María Fidalgo, prone to continuity, and Ignacio Fernández Toxo, supporters of understanding with the opposition currents.
- Critical sector of CCOO: current formed in 1996 by the left wing of CCOO and linked to the Communist Party of Spain (PCE). It was led by Agustín Moreno and supported by Marcelino Camacho. Currently its main spokesperson is Salce Elvira. It has a majority in the Federation of Pensioners and Retirees, and in the territorial federations of Asturies, the Balearic Islands and La Rioja.
- Confederal Alternative: a split of the Confederal Majority, headed by former secretary of organization Rodolfo Benito. They have clear majority in the Federations of Construction and Wood, Agrifood, and in the regional unions of Madrid, Aragón, the Canary Islands and Melilla. They are known in the union as the rodolfos or benitos.
