= Ignacio Fernández Toxo =

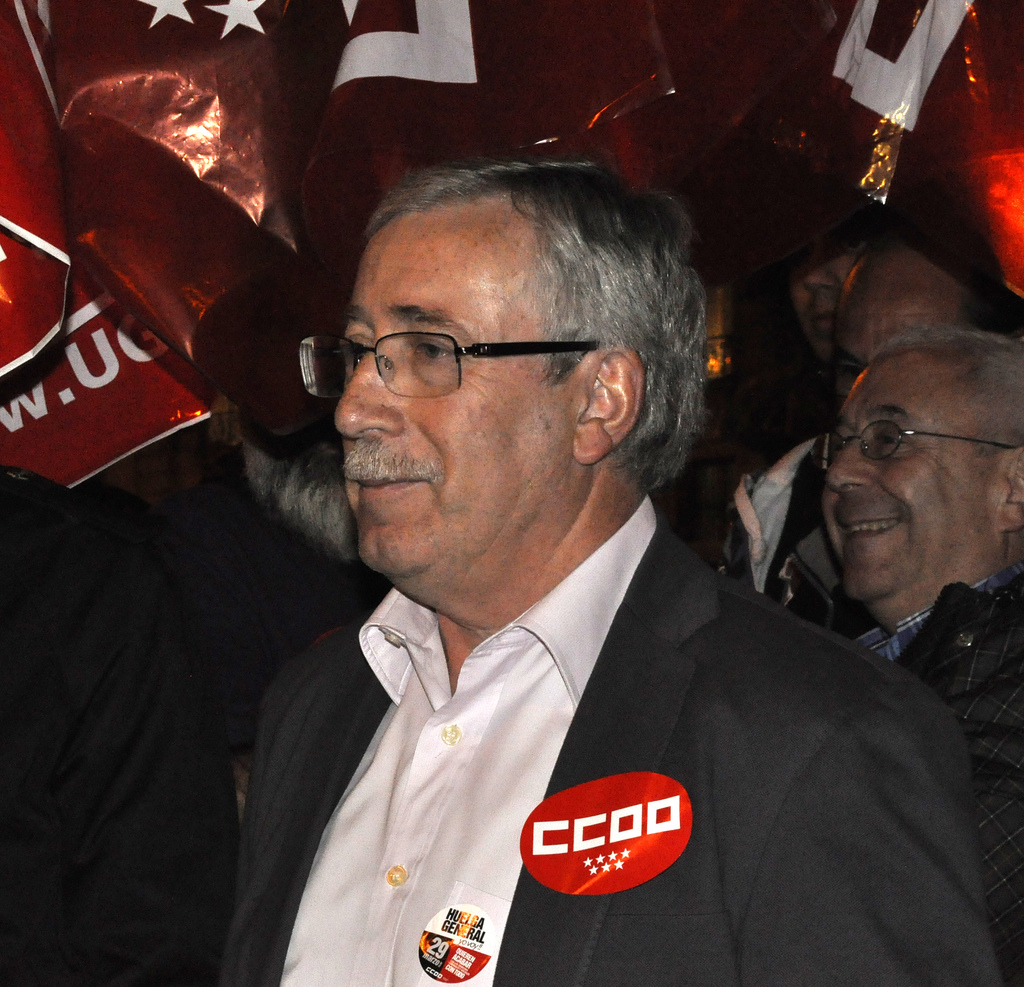
- Ignacio Fernández Toxo in March 2012

Secretary General of CCOO
- In office 19 December 2000 – July 2017
- Preceded by: José María Fidalgo
- Succeeded by: Unai Sordo

President of the ETUC
- In office 11 May 2011 – May 2015
- Preceded by: Wanja Lundby-Wedin
- Succeeded by: Rudy De Leeuw

Secretary General of the Federation of Metal/Federation of Metalworkers and Miners of CCOO
- In office November 1987 – November 2004
- Preceded by: Juan Ignacio Marín
- Succeeded by: Felipe López Alonso

Personal details
- Born: 25 November 1952 (age 73) Ferrol, A Coruña, Spain
- Party: Liga Comunista Revolucionaria (1971–1978); Communist Party of Spain (1969–1971 and 1978–1995)
- Profession: Metalworker, Union Leader

Ignacio Fernández Toxo ['toʃo] (Ferrol, 25 November 1952) is a Spanish Trade Unionist that held the position of General Secretary of the Spanish union Workers' Commissions (CCOO) from 2008 to 2017 and President of the European Trade Union Confederation (ETUC) from 2011 to 2015.

== Biography ==
He began his working life as an apprentice in the Empresa Nacional Bazán de Construcciones Navales Militares SA (Bazan), a company that was merged with Astilleros Españoles SA (AESA) in July 2000, forming the company Izar Construcciones Navales. He continued working in that company until taking early retirement through a government redundancy program passed by the SEPI in April 2005.

During his youth, he was politically active in the Revolutionary Communist League and later the Spanish Communist Party.

His union activity began in Bazán during his time as an apprentice. At the age of 19 he participated in the organisation of the general strike of Ferrol on the 10 March 1972. During demonstrations the Armed Police rounded up some strikers, among whom was the young apprentice Toxo, and began firing indiscriminately, injuring more than 40 people and killing two workers from Bazán: members of the CCOO, Amador Rey and Daniel Niebla. The union life of Toxo - who regularly attended the annual wreath-laying at the monument to those killed in Ferrol on 10 March - was deeply marked by this experience of his youth, as evidenced by his later statements about this episode.

As a consequence of the strike on the 10 March, Toxo was fired and sentenced to 5 years in prison. Toxo escaped from the La Coruña prison and lived in hiding until the passage of the Amnesty Law in October 1977, but nevertheless took part in the 1977 Spanish general election as head of the slate for the Front for Workers Unity for A Coruña province.

As a result of the amnesty law Toxo regained his job in Bazan, where he came to be elected president of the Internal Committee of the company. During the attempted coup of 23 February 1981, he was held hostage in the Ferrol city hall together with Mayor Jaime Quintanilla and other citizens and social representatives of the city. However, the loyal General Captain Miguel Romero Moreno controlled the plaza and, finally, the situation was resolved without serious incident.

In November 1987 he was elected General Secretary of the Metal Federation of the CCOO replacing Juan Ignacio Marín, a position he held until November 1995, when the Metal and Mining Federations of the union merged. After the merger, Toxo was elected General Secretary of the resulting organisation, the CCOO Federation of Metalworkers and Miners, a position he held until 2004 when he was replaced by Felipe López Alonso. During this period he defended the union position in the industrial restructuring, participating in the organisation of the "Iron March".

From 2004 until 2008 he held the office of Secretary of Union Action and Sectoral Policies of the Union Confederation of the CCOO, and he was a member of the Confederal Council and the Confederal Executive Commission of the union.

On 19 December 2008 he was elected CCOO General Secretary at the 9th Confederal Congress, replacing José María Fidalgo. During his term in office, CCOO has positioned itself in opposition to the policy of cuts initiated in May 2010 by President Jose Luis Rodriguez Zapatero and continued by his successor, Mariano Rajoy, by promoting three general strikes at the state level and various strikes and mobilizations at local and sector levels. Under his direction the union employed a new strategy that entailed bringing Popular Legislative Initiatives before the Congress of Deputies on issues such as labor law, housing rights and taxation.

On 18 May 2011 he was elected President of the European Trade Union Confederation, replacing Wanja Lundby-Wedin, a union member from Sweden. As president of the ETUC he has argued before the institutions of the European Union (EU) in favor of greater political integration of the member countries, an expanded role of the ECB, the integration of the tax systems of the EU countries, and the convergence of labor laws of the member countries.

In March 2017, at a meeting of the Confederla Council of the Union Toxo, he announced his intention of not running for reelection in the upcoming 11th Confederal Congress to be held in June. At the Congress Toxo was replaced by the Basque regional secretary Unai Sordo whom Toxo has supported as candidate.

== Awards ==
Commander of the National Order of Merit of France.

== Personal life ==
Fernández Toxo identifies as a communist and an atheist.
