= National Institute for Safety and Health at Work =

Spanish government agency

- Instituto Nacional de Seguridad y Salud en el Trabajo

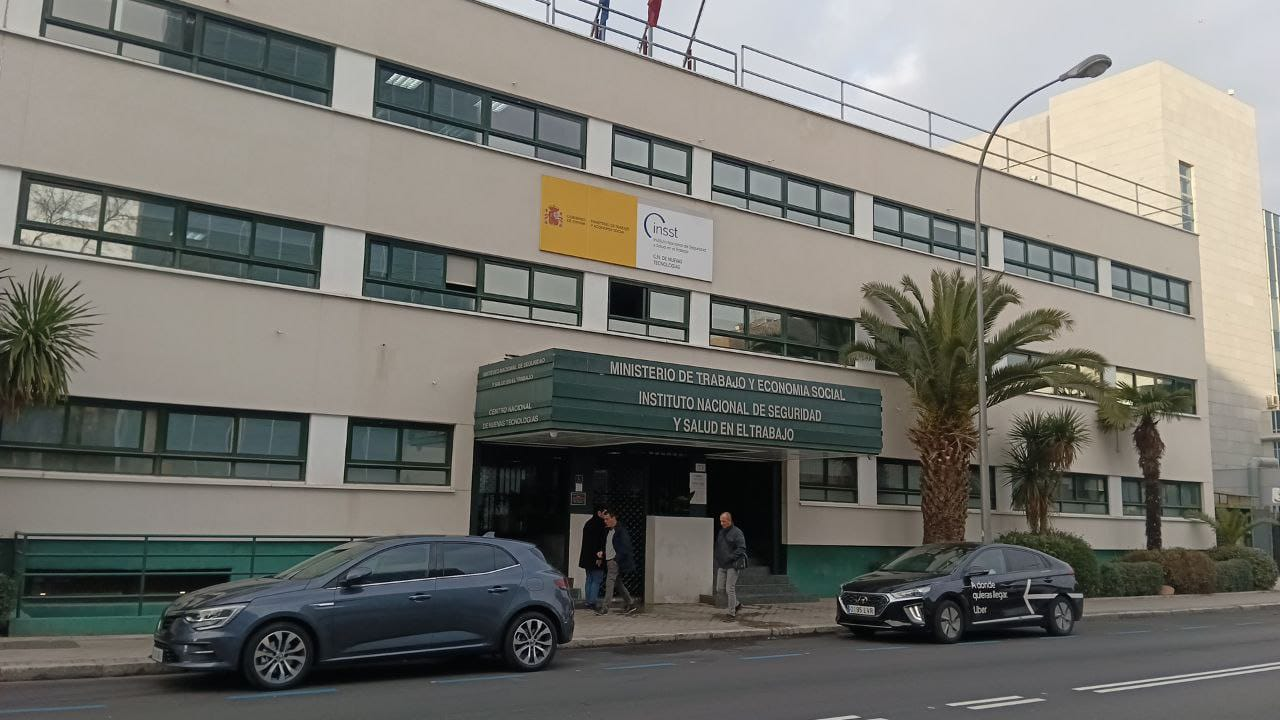

Agency overview
- Formed: March 9, 1971; 55 years ago
- Type: Autonomous agency
- Jurisdiction: Spanish government
- Headquarters: 73 Torrelaguna Street; Madrid
- Employees: 352 employees, 2024
- Annual budget: €69.3 million (2023)
- Agency executive: Aitana Garí Pérez, Director
- Parent department: Ministry of Labour
- Website: www.insst.es

The National Institute for Safety and Health at Work (Spanish: Instituto Nacional de Seguridad y Salud en el Trabajo, INSST) is an autonomous agency of the Government of Spain. The INSST is considered a technical-scientific agency entrusted with the task of analyze and research on safety and health conditions at work, as well of promoting and supporting the improvement of them, in order to achieve a decrease in occupational hazards, work accidents and occupational diseases.

The INSST, in the framework of its responsibilities, is responsible for ensuring coordination, supporting the exchange of information and experiences between the different public administrations and it especially encourages and supports the implementation of safety and health promotion activities by the Spanish regions. Likewise, it provides, in agreement with the competent Administrations, specialized technical support for certification, testing and accreditation.

At the European Union level, it acts as the national reference centre, guaranteeing the coordination and transmission of the information that it must provide at the national level, in particular with regard to the European Agency for Safety and Health at Work and its Network.

== Powers ==
Most of the INSST powers are granted by the Occupational Hazards Prevention Act of 1995. According to this law, the INSST has five fundamental responsibilities:

- To provide technical advice in the development of legal regulations and in the development of standardization, both nationally and internationally.
- To promote and, where appropriate, carry out training, information, research, study and dissemination activities in the field of occupational hazards prevention, with the appropriate coordination and collaboration, where appropriate, with the technical bodies on preventive matters of the Autonomous Communities in the exercise of their functions in this matter.
- To provide technical support and collaborate with the Labour and Social Security Inspectorate in fulfilling its monitoring and control responsibilities.
- To collaborate with international organizations and to develop international cooperation programs in this area, facilitating the participation of the Autonomous Communities.
- Any others that are necessary for the fulfillment of its purposes and are entrusted to it within the scope of its competences, in accordance with the National Committee on Safety and Health at Work.

== History ==
=== National Plan ===
The INSST was created in 1971 under the name of the National Plan for Health and Safety at Work. The creation of this Plan was entrusted to the Directorate-General for Social Security by the Labour Minister, Licinio de la Fuente. The work of the directorate-general ended the following year, designing a Plan with great autonomy and attached to the aforementioned directorate-general. This plan deployed an institutional framework throughout the national territory with the objective of, as ordered to it by the Social Security Bases Act of 1963, erasing or reducing the risk in the different centres and work places; to stimulate and develop with the actors involved in the workplace, a positive and constructive attitude towards the prevention of work accidents and diseases that may arise from their professional activity; and achieve, individually or collectively, an optimal health status.

Likewise, the Plan provided for the creation of structures such as the Territorial Institutes for Health and Safety at Work, the Provincial Technical Cabinets and the Centres for Health and Safety at Work to respond to the need to extend preventive actions to small and medium-sized enterprises and to contribute to the training of specialists in Occupational Health and Safety, since the Occupational Medicine with greater tradition had its own means for training through the Institute for Occupational Medicine and the School of Medicine for the training of doctors and ATS and company nurses. The lack of specialists was especially pronounced in Occupational Health, a branch that only had a small development in the National Institute for Occupational Medicine.

In addition to the above, the National Plan, by delegation of the Organization of the Medical Services for Enterprises (OSME), it assumed the powers of inspection and advice of the Medical Services for Enterprises, a task carried out until 1986, date in which they were transferred to the National Institute for Health (INSALUD). In 1971, the National Plan carried out the first labour health campaign in the history of Spain.

=== Social Service ===
The National Plan for Occupational Health and Safety had a short life, since in 1976 the Social Service for Health and Safety at Work was created by the Ministry of Labour, which replaced the National Plan in all its functions and competences. The National Institute for Occupational Medicine and Safety, the National School for Occupational Medicine and the OSME were also integrated into the Social Service; that is to say, all the organisms on which the Occupational Medicine and Medical Services for Enterprises depended.

=== National Institute ===
Even shorter was the life of the Social Service, which was replaced in 1978 by the National Institute for Safety and Hygiene at Work. The decentralization process caused that the Provincial Technical Cabinets with the corresponding Centres were transferred to the Autonomous Communities that assumed the powers on health and safety at work in coordination and cooperation with the National Institute that it was configured as the specialized scientific-technical body of the General State Administration with the mission of analyze and study of health and safety conditions at work, as well as the promotion and support to improve them. Likewise, the National Institute acted as a national reference centre before the Institutions of the European Union guaranteeing the coordination and transmission of the information that it must provide at national level, in particular with regard to the European Agency for Safety and Health at Work and its Network

It has remained the same since then, although it has undergone two changes of denomination. The first was in 2017, when it was renamed as the National Institute for Safety, Health and Welfare at Work, because, according to the government, the society of that time was sufficiently sensitized to this issue and was increasingly demanding on everything relative to work welfare. This change was not well seen by the opposition, mainly the Socialist Party, which criticized the change because it considered it a simple "change of concept and a devaluation of the functions of the Institution" when using "terms from the field of public health" to "divert attention to the serious problems we currently have as a result of the Labour Reform". Likewise, in the farewell letter of the agency's director, Dolores Limón, she included this change of denomination as one of the reasons for her resignation.

Indeed, and in coherence with the criticisms made a year earlier, the coming to power of a socialist government in 2018 led to the change of name to the National Institute for Safety and Health at Work.

== Organization chart ==
The INSST is structured through central and territorial bodies.

=== Central bodies ===
All the central bodies have their headquarters in Madrid.

- The Director. The agency's director has the rank of deputy director-general and it is appointed and dismissed by an Order of the Minister of Labour with the advice of the Director-General for Labour, among the public administration's civil servants. The director assumes the representation of the Institute and it directs its activity for the fulfilment of its purposes. The director also act as the link between the General Council and the rest of the agency's organs. Finally, the director is the superior responsible for the payments and expenditures. A Deputy Technical Director and a Secretary-General assists the director.
- The General Council. It is responsible for informing the Ministry of Labour about the national action plans for occupational safety and health and for reporting on INSST performance criteria. It is chaired by the Secretary of State for Labour, being First Vice President the Director-General for Labour and Second Vice President the Director of the Institute. The Secretary-General of the Institute will act as secretary of the council, with voice but without vote.
  - It is composed of the following members:
    - Thirteen representatives of the most representative Trade Unions.
    - Thirteen representatives of business organizations.
    - Thirteen representatives of the Public Administration.

=== Territorial bodies ===
The territorial bodies are decentralized organs responsible for executing the policies of the Institute at regional and/or provincial level. They are:

- The Research and Technical Assistance Centres, also called National Centres. They perform, within the national scope, the functions that the Office of the Director of the Institute confers or delegates to them, developing specialized techniques of information and documentation, homologation and standardization, environment and ergonomics.
  - There are currently four centres:
    - The National Centre for Working Conditions (CNCT) in Barcelona.
    - The National Centre for Protection Means (CNMP) in Seville.
    - The National Centre for New Technologies (CNNT) in Madrid.
    - The National Centre for Machinery Verification (CNVM) in Barakaldo.
- The Provincial Technical Cabinets. They are responsible for the execution of the competencies of the Institute at the provincial level, with a director at their head. Currently there are only two, one in Ceuta and one in Melilla.

== National Committee on Safety and Health at Work ==
The National Committee on Safety and Health at Work (CNSST) created by the Occupational Hazards Prevention Act of 1995, is the collective advisory body of the Spanish Public Administrations in the formulation of prevention policies and institutional participation body in occupational safety and health. It is composed of representatives of the General State Administration, the Administrations of the Autonomous Communities and representatives of the most representative business and union organizations.

The National Institute for Safety and Health at Work assumes the General Secretariat of the National Committee, providing the necessary technical and scientific assistance for the development of its competences.
