= Law of Spain =

The Law of Spain is the legislation in force in the Kingdom of Spain, which is understood to mean Spanish territory, Spanish waters, consulates and embassies, and ships flying the Spanish flag in democratically elected institutions.

== Characteristics ==
Spanish law follows the continental system, which means it is supported principally by the law in the broad sense (laws and regulations) and to a lesser extent by judicial decisions and customs. Likewise, it is a complex law, in which various autonomous community legislation coexists with the national.

=== Constitutional supremacy ===
The supreme Spanish law is the Spanish Constitution of 1978, which regulates the functioning of public bodies and the fundamental rights of the Spanish people, as well as the organization and competencies of the different autonomous communities. The Constitution, as well as being directly applicable by the judiciary, enjoys a material supremacy that determines the rest of the laws in Spain.

=== Constitutional control ===
All laws in Spain must be declared compatible with the Constitution (all laws that contravene the Constitution are invalid). However, it is clear that a public body is needed to regulate the fulfilment of this rule. In Spain's case, a Constitutional Court exists, which follows the Kelsenian (or Austrian) model.

Following this doctrine, the constitutional court has two basic functions:

- Ensuring all law is compatible with the Constitution.
- Declaring the nullity of laws which contravene the Constitution.

In a case where an ordinary court questions a law, only the right of the declaration is available, and it must go to the Constitutional Court with the question of constitutionality so that it can be declared, thus it is the only body which possesses the power to reject laws.

=== Separation of functions ===
The division of powers, a fundamental idea in liberal thinking, is the core of the political system. Although, the Spanish Constitution only establishes the separation of functions. At its heart, national sovereignty permits the election, by universal suffrage (men and woman older than 18), of representatives of the sovereign people in the Cortes Generales. The Cortes Generales exercise legislative power through two chambers, the Congress of Deputies and the Senate, choose the Prime Minister and control the actions of the executive power, which must obey the law.

The judicial powers fall into the hands of the judges and courts, an office which the public has access to, and in a jury, which is formed by nationals chosen by lottery in every case. The Constitutional Court controls the laws and the actions of the public administration must fit into the Magna Carta.

== Sources of law ==
The sources of law in Spain are:

- Codified Law, meaning civil law,
- Usage, or customary law,
- General principles of law, and
- Jurisprudence, which is a secondary source.

The history of the Spanish legal system includes the Justinian Code, customary laws from the Germanic and Celtic "invaders", the acts of the Cortes of 1808, the Napoleonic Code, the Civil Code of 1888, and early 20th century constitutional developments.

=== Organization of Spanish public law ===
1. Constitutional law. This is the collection of laws and judicial institutions related to the organization of the constitutional bodies and the exercise of the citizen's basic rights and freedoms.
2. Administrative law. This regulates the organization and functioning of the powers and bodies of the state and its relations with individuals.
3. Criminal law. This regulates the so-called punitive (disciplinary) actions.
4. Process law. This is integrated by the collection of laws that regulate judging procedures.
5. Financial and tax law. This is a collection of laws that organize or study the resources that constitute the finances of the State and the other public bodies. They regulate the procedures to obtain deposits and to regulate expenses and payments.
6. International public law. This is integrated by the laws that regulate the judicial relations between each state and the other members of the international community.

=== Organization of Spanish private law ===
1. Civil law. This is integrated by the collection of laws that regulate the person, the family, personal assets, contractual relations and the extra contractual civil responsibility . Within this we find the common and local law.
2. Commercial law. This is the collection of laws that regulate law relating to business, within the world of business.
3. Labour or social law. This regulates the relationships between employees and employers. Complaints about social security fall under public law.
4. International private law. This regulates the relationships between physical and judicial persons of different nationalities.

=== Public and private law ===
In Spain, within public law is included the regulation of the highest state institutions, constitutional law, which regulates the organisation, competencies and functioning of the constitutional bodies (the State Council, the Account Court, the Constitutional Court, the General Council of the Judicial Power of Spain, etc.), constitutionally recognised rights and the constitutional mechanisms to do with the interference by the public bodies with individual freedoms, rights and guarantees.

Also included within the realm of public law are criminal law, process law, financial and tax law and certain parts of labour law (infractions and sanctions of the public order, for example).

=== Hierarchy of laws ===
Article 1.2 of the Spanish Civil Code establishes that inferior and superior laws to be distinguished. However, the relationship between laws is not limited to a question of hierarchy, but also relationships of competency exist between some laws and others.

With effect to this, the Spanish Constitution of 1978 is the supreme law, which regulates all the complex relationships between the different laws and their place in the hierarchy.

The hierarchy of Spanish laws is thus:

1. The Constitution.
2. International treaties.
3. The law in its strict sense: Organic Law (which requires an absolute majority from the Cortes Generales), ordinary law and regulatory laws (amongst which are found the Royal Decree-Law and the Royal Legislative Decree).
4. Laws stemming from the executive, with its own hierarchy based on the function of the body that made them (Royal Decree, Decree, Ministerial Order, etc.).

Besides this, the Spanish Constitution establishes the competency of the Autonomous Communities with regard to the regulation of certain areas, and their ability to create legal laws via their own Parliaments. In a procedure between the autonomous parliament and the national parliament the Statute of Autonomy exists, which is the fundamental law for the Autonomous Communities. After this, the hierarchy of laws will be the law dictated by the autonomous parliament with regard to its regulatory competencies, dictated by the autonomous executive.

Local authorities do not have legislative abilities even if they possess regulatory authority.

The relationship between autonomous and national laws depends the competencies established in the Constitution and in the respective Statute of Autonomy. The Constitutional Court is the body with the power to decide if a law is constitutional or not as well as the power to resolve conflicts regarding competencies between the State, the Autonomous Community and the Local Authorities. Only European Community law in line with precedential Spanish Constitution 1978, provincial, diplomatic and judicial findings can be considered to have standing. Lack of a prior challenge does not negate future negation based on the national law. Spanish culture restrains many challenges that knowledgeable lawyers are prepared to pursue if required by a case.

=== Relationship between European Community and Spanish law ===
As well as these three levels, reference must be made to EC law, which is an autonomous legal system applicable in Spain and whose laws are sovereign over national laws with virtue to the hierarchy of sources, which places international treaties at a higher level than the law. Regarding the Constitution there is a great debate between Constitutionalists and Communitarians as to which is supreme. For the former the Constitution is supreme, whereas for the latter the Treaties are supreme. In practice, the only time in which the Constitution and Treaties conflicted, the Constitution was modified to be in line with the Treaties.

On its part, EC law is divided into original and derived law, the original having its origins in the Treaties ratified by Spain, and the derived emanating from the EC institutions.

All laws stemming from EC institutions are directly applicable in Spain in virtue of the Treaty of the European Union, ratified by Spain and thus part of the internal Spanish law. Given that the treaties have a higher hierarchical position compared to laws, in the case of conflict the Treaties will be given primacy.

Within EC law it is necessary to distinguish between directives and regulations. Directives need the Member State to apply them by passing laws whereas regulations are directly applicable.

== Interpretation of laws in Spain ==
The Spanish Civil Code regulates the interpretation of laws in Spain, and establishes the following:

3.1. Laws are to be interpreted according to the proper meaning of their words, in relation to their context, historic and legal records and the social reality of the time in which they have to be applied, paying particular attention to the spirit and finality of the above. 3.2. Equity must be considered in the application of laws, although the Courts' decisions can only exclusively rest on this when the law expressly permits this.

— Article 3 Spanish Civil Code

4.1. The analogous enforcement of laws will occur when the laws do not contemplate a specific supposition, but they

— Article 4 Spanish Civil Code
