= Ministry of Labour (Spain) =

Government ministry of Spain

Ministry of Labour and Social Economy
- Ministerio de Trabajo y Economía Social

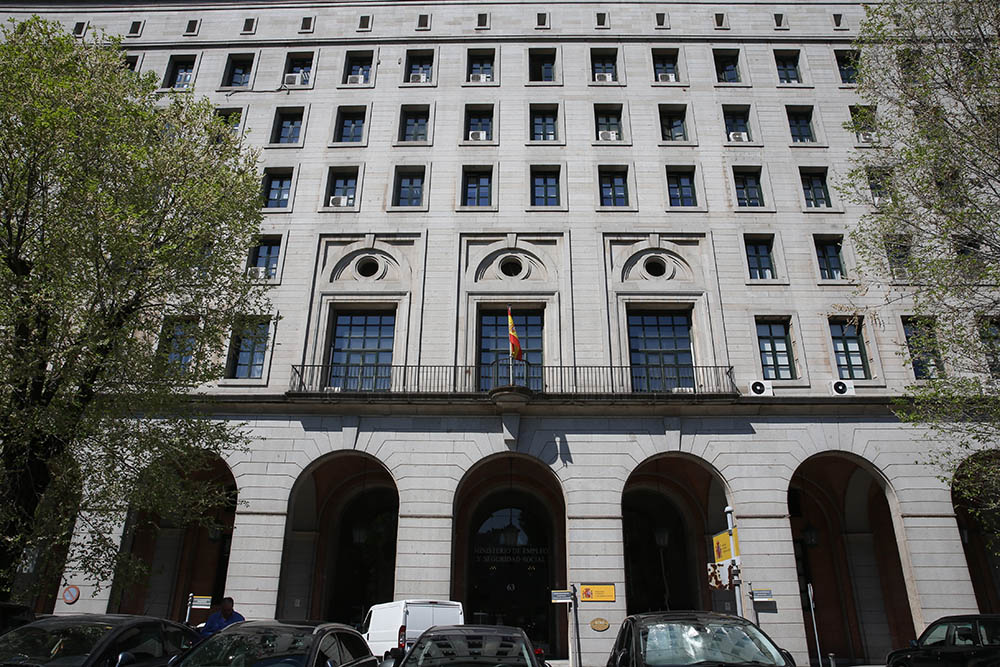
- Main door of the Ministry in the Nuevos Ministerios complex

Agency overview
- Formed: May 8, 1920; 106 years ago
- Preceding agencies: Ministry of the Interior; Ministry of Development
- Type: Ministry
- Jurisdiction: Spanish government
- Headquarters: Nuevos Ministerios, Agustín de Bethencourt Street 4, (Madrid)
- Employees: 13,569 (2024)
- Annual budget: € 28.8 billion, 2026
- Minister responsible: Yolanda Díaz, Minister
- Agency executives: Joaquín Pérez Rey, Secretary of State for Labour; Amparo Merino, Secretary of State for Social Economy; María Concepción Peinado Reillo, Under-Secretary
- Website: www.mites.gob.es

The Ministry of Labour and Social Economy (MITES) is the department of the Government of Spain responsible for designing and implementing the government policy on labour and labour relations, employment, unemployment benefits and self-employment, social economy and corporate social responsibility.

The Labour Department was created by prime minister Eduardo Dato in 1920, and has existed ever since. In addition to labour-related responsibilities, in the past it has also had, for most of its history, powers over social security and social protection, immigration and, occasionally, over health care, trade, industry and justice affairs.

Its headquarters have been located in the Nuevos Ministerios government complex since the 1960s, and it also has additional offices for certain agencies throughout the city of Madrid. In addition, it has regional and provincial offices across the country.

== History ==
The idea of creating a ministerial department dedicated to labour issues arose during the reign of Alfonso XIII. This period was influenced by Krausism ideas, which, throughout the Restoration (1874–1931), contributed to social policies. Specifically, in Spain, the Institución Libre de Enseñanza (English: Free Institution of Teaching), created in 1876, was the first place where the "social question" was debated and it proposed the creation of various bodies aimed at addressing workers' problems and working conditions.

Thus, in 1883 the Commission on Social Reforms was created, which later became the Institute of Social Reforms in 1903. The latter's impetus led to the creation of other organizations such as the Labour Inspectorate in 1906 and the National Institute of Social Insurance in 1908. In parallel, Spanish legislation at the beginning of the 20th century began to delve deeper into these areas, with laws such as the Law on Workplace Accidents of 30 January 1900—the first law to address occupational risks and hold employers responsible for them—, the Law on Women and Children Labour of 13 March 1900, the Law on Sunday Rest of 3 March 1904, and the Law on the Right to Strike of 1909, among others. Furthermore, social pressure, exemplified by protests such as the La Canadenca strike, forced the adoption of measures such as the eight-hour workday in 1919.

=== Twentieth century ===
The Ministry of Labour was created on 8 May 1920, during the third government of Eduardo Dato, however, it was not a new idea and it had two immediate precedents.

In May 1913, the second government of the Count of Romanones sent a bill to the Cortes to create a Ministry of Labour, Trade and Industry, with the aim of having it operational by July 1, 1913. However, when the Count left the government in October of that year, the bill was still under discussion and was not passed.

In April 1914, King Alfonso XIII stated in his opening speech to the Cortes the intention of his government to create this department. Indeed, Prime Minister Dato embraced his predecessor's idea and immediately requested an official report from the Institute of Social Reforms on the advisability of creating a Ministry of Labour in Spain. This report, however, was not favorable to its creation, since the Institute believed that Spain still lacked a consolidated labour system and its agencies, such as the labour inspectorate, were not fully developed, and therefore recommended focusing efforts on addressing these issues. Furthermore, the outbreak of World War I ultimately shelved the project.

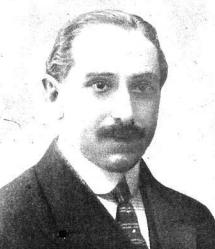
Carlos Cañal y Migolla, first labour minister (1920–1921)

Once the war was over, Dato formed his third government on 6 May 1920. Two days later, King Alfonso gave royal assent to the decrees establishing the new government department and appointing Carlos Cañal y Migolla as first minister of labour.

This new ministry brought together all those bodies and agencies related to the "social question" already mentioned above that were in the Ministry of the Interior. Likewise, the Labour Bureau of the Directorate-General for Trade, Industry and Labour of the Ministry of Development, the Emigration Council, and the Board of Engineers and Pensioned Abroad Workers were also integrated into this new ministry. All this entailed the loss of powers of the Institute of Social Reforms, which would be abolished in May 1924.

In 1922, similar to the 1913 project, the department was renamed "Ministry of Labour, Trade and Industry" by assuming powers from the ministries of Development—trade and industry—and of Public Instruction and Fine Arts—statistics—. The industry and trade responsibilities were transferred to the new Ministry of National Economy (today known as Ministry of Industry) in 1928.

In a time of great conflict, in 1923 General Miguel Primo de Rivera established a dictatorship that would last until 1930. At first, he abolished the ministry and appointed Alejandro García Martín, a civil servant, as the person responsible for the affairs of the "Department of Labour, Trade and Industry". Later, the dictator established that the departments would be managed by the under-secretary and in June 1924 the Institue for Social Reforms is abolished, being replace it by the Labour Council, as an advisory body.

It was a time of great labour advances, perhaps because some reformist members of the defunct Institute of Social Reforms held important positions in the Ministry, approving relevant regulations such as the first Labour Code in 1926, the Home-based work Regulation of 1927—which aimed to regulate and provide some protection for manual labour carried out at home, predominantly by women—and the Emmigration Law—to protect Spanish workers abroad. Also, similar to Italian fascist institutions, Minister Aunós introduced corporatism through the Organización Corporativa Nacional. Furthermore, vocational training was promoted to end what Primo de Rivera described as "technical illiteracy", approving the Industrial Education Statute and a Social School for this purpose.

==== Second Republic ====
The second Spanish republican period emphasized its social character, establishing a "democratic republic of workers of all classes, organized under a regime of Liberty and Justice" and was characterized by significant governmental instability, which was clearly reflected in the Ministry of Labour. During the eight years of the republic, the department changed its name several times, being merged with Justice and Health on various occasions, and 18 persons served as labour minister.

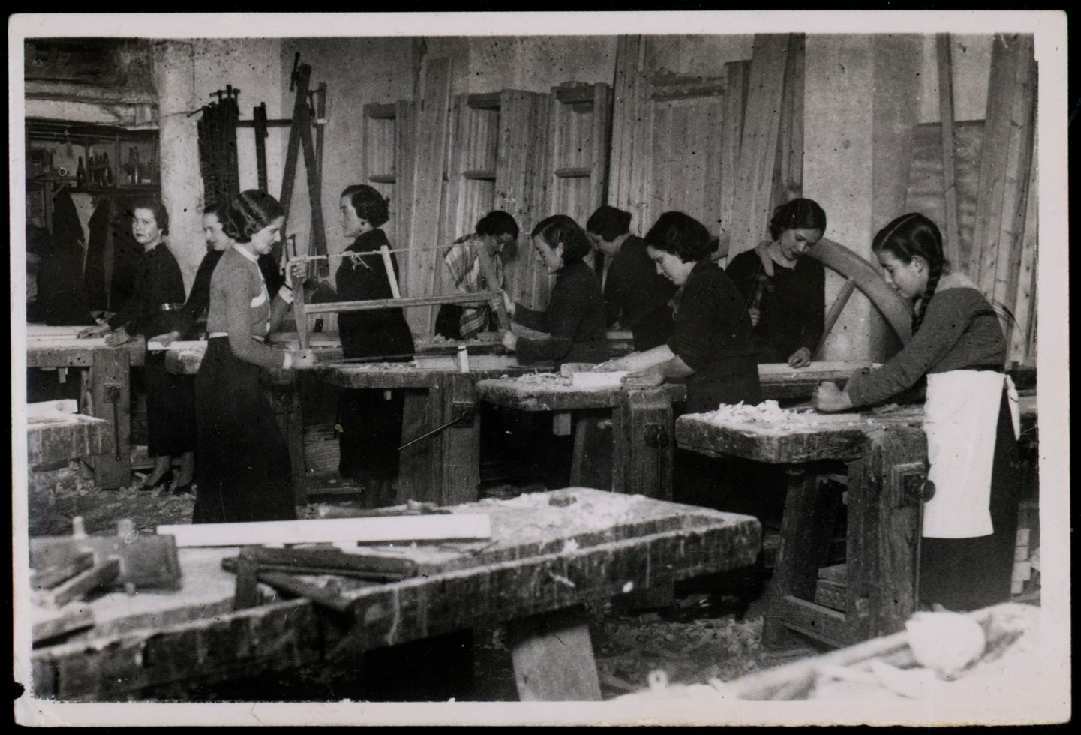
Women learning the carpentry trade during the Second Republic.

Despite this, the constitutionalization of labour rights represents a period of significant protection, especially with the establishment of the Constitutional Guarantees Court (predecessor of the current Constitutional Court). This led to the establishment of rights such as freedom of movement, freedom of profession, immigration and emigration rights, and the recognition of freedom of association and unionization, among others. The Constitution also recognized the protection of the rights of children and women in the workplace, as well as the right to private ownership of the means of production, although these are limited to the public interest (and may be socialized or expropriated).

During Francisco Largo Caballero's tenure as labour minister, significant legislative work was carried out through decrees, most of which were subsequently ratified and made law by the Cortes. These included decrees on Workers' Associations, rural leases, forced labour, collective leases, and the implementation of workers' compensation insurance in rural areas, among others. At the same time, the parliament passed relevant legislation such as the 1931 Labour Contract Law—which regulated in depth all labour aspects and established a system of precedence of sources similar to the current one: law, working bases, collective agreements or conventions and regulations—or the active collaboration that the department had in the design of the agararian reform fostered by agriculture minister Marcelino Domingo which, among other objectives, sought to improve the conditions of rural workers.

Following Largo Caballero's departure from the ministry, instability skyrocketed, and the ministry entered a period of "corrective action", reversing some of Largo Caballero's labour policies and reducing the power of workers on the mixed juries (which oversaw labour contracts). Furthermore, with Federico Salmón's arrival at the department in 1935, the focus shifted to the problem of unemployment. This led to the approval of the Unemployment Prevention Law of 1935, known as the Salmón Law, which aimed to combat unemployment by building housing, guaranteeing tax advantages for construction companies, and promoting and regulating the construction of rural schools for the children of farmers. Salmon's team drafted 18 bills in just over seven months, among which the reform of mixed juries, the creation of the National Board of Relief for the Involuntarily Unemployed, and the new dignity granted to labour inspectors stand out.

During the Civil War, labour issues were divided into two separate areas, developed in parallel on each side of the conflict. On the Republican side, the Ministry of Labour, Health and Social Welfare was maintained, while on the Nationalist side, following the Labour Council, the Ministry of Organization and Trade Union Action was established, which after the war would revert to its original name of "Labour".

==== Dictatorship of Francisco Franco ====
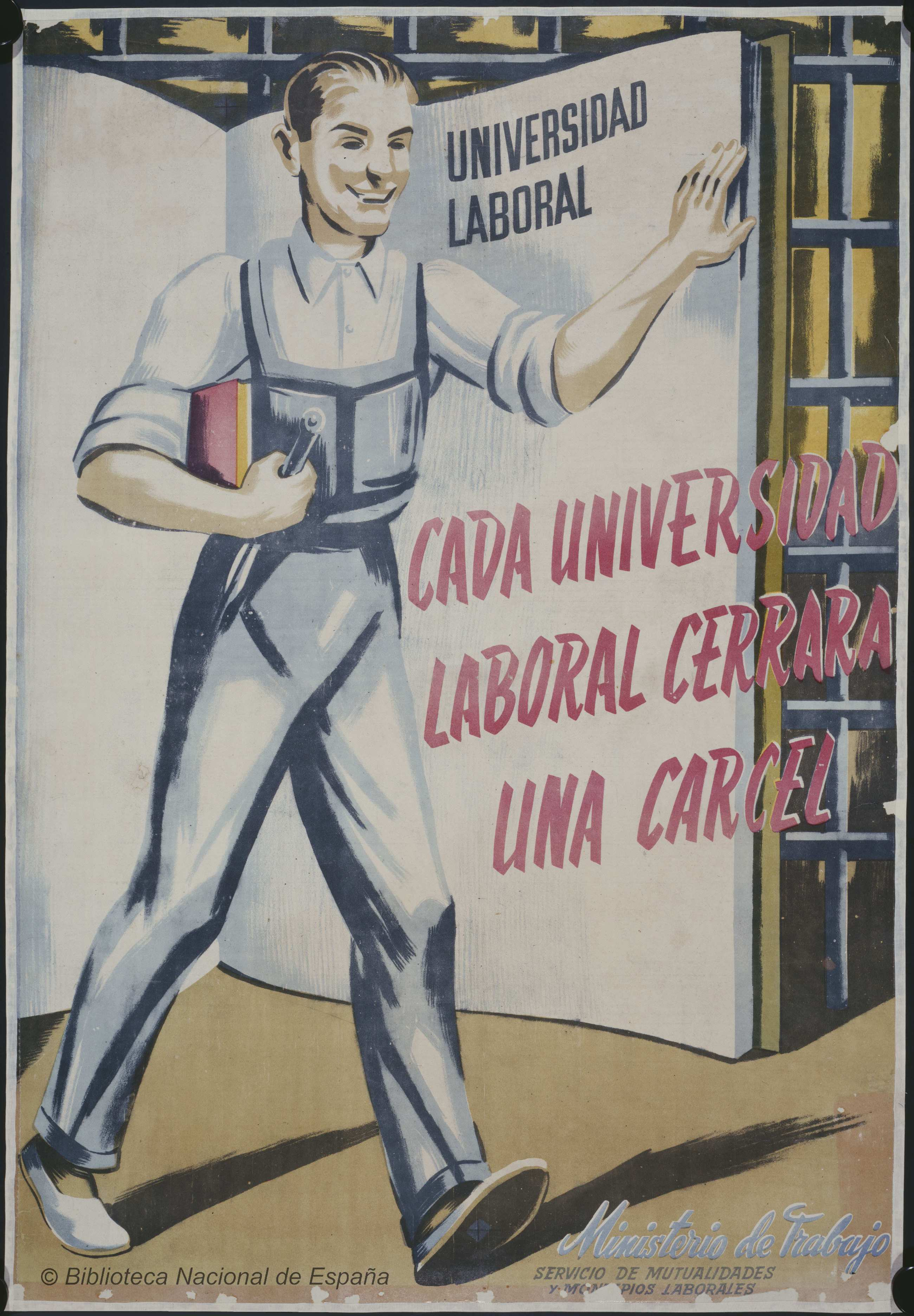
Poster promoting vocational universities with the slogan "Each vocational university will close a prison". 1955

Under the dictatorship of Francisco Franco, a significant interventionist effort was undertaken in the world of labour and workers, with the aim of controlling what remained of the labour movement. Specifically, the regime suppressed the freedoms of association, assembly and strike, as well as limited collective bargaining, (Note: Collective bargaining was permitted and encouraged, but there was no real freedom because the negotiations were supervised by the Government and, in case of stalemate, the intervention of the ministry meant the issuance of a unilateral decree that was binding on the parties.) and reduced the labour movement to the Vertical Syndicate, thus establishing state control over the working class. The Ministry of Labour was the centre of this new labour corporatism, expanding its capacity for action, establishing even the smallest details of working conditions, and dictating all measures related to work activity, including: job categories, wages, working hours, working conditions, rest periods, vacations, disciplinary actions, and so on.

To ensure the workers loyalty, the first law to be passed was the Labour Charter (Spanish: Fuero del Trabajo) in 1938, a fundamental law that established the ideological, political and economic principles that were to govern the "New State". Another of these regulations was the Trade Union Unity Law of 1940, which created the Vertical Syndicate—and which was developed by the Law of Bases of the Trade Union Organization—where employers and workers were grouped together, an organization controlled by the National Delegation of Trade Unions, which was attached to the FET and of the JONS until 1971, when the position of the Minister for Trade Union Relations was created and the powers over trade union relations properly returned to the State.

Between 1941 and 1957, José Antonio Girón, described as the "standard-bearer of Falangist discourse" within the Franco regime, was in charge of the labour portfolio. The department coexisted during the dictatorship with the Spanish Trade Union Organization—commonly known as the Vertical Syndicate—, an organization that Girón de Velasco considered complementary to the Ministry of Labour.

Similar to what happened during the dictatorship of Primo de Rivera, vocational training received a new impetus with plans such as the National Plan for the Professional Development of Adults, commonly known by its main program, the Workers' Professional Development Program (Programa de Promoción Profesional Obrera, PPO). There was also a sister program for the Army, the Military Workers' Professional Development Program (Programa de Promoción Profesional Obrera en el Ejército, PPE). This "almost improvised" plan, according to the OECD, achieved "a series of unexpected results that allow us today to establish a coherent doctrine born from this rich experience". Between 1964 and 1974, this plan trained more than 1.2 million workers.

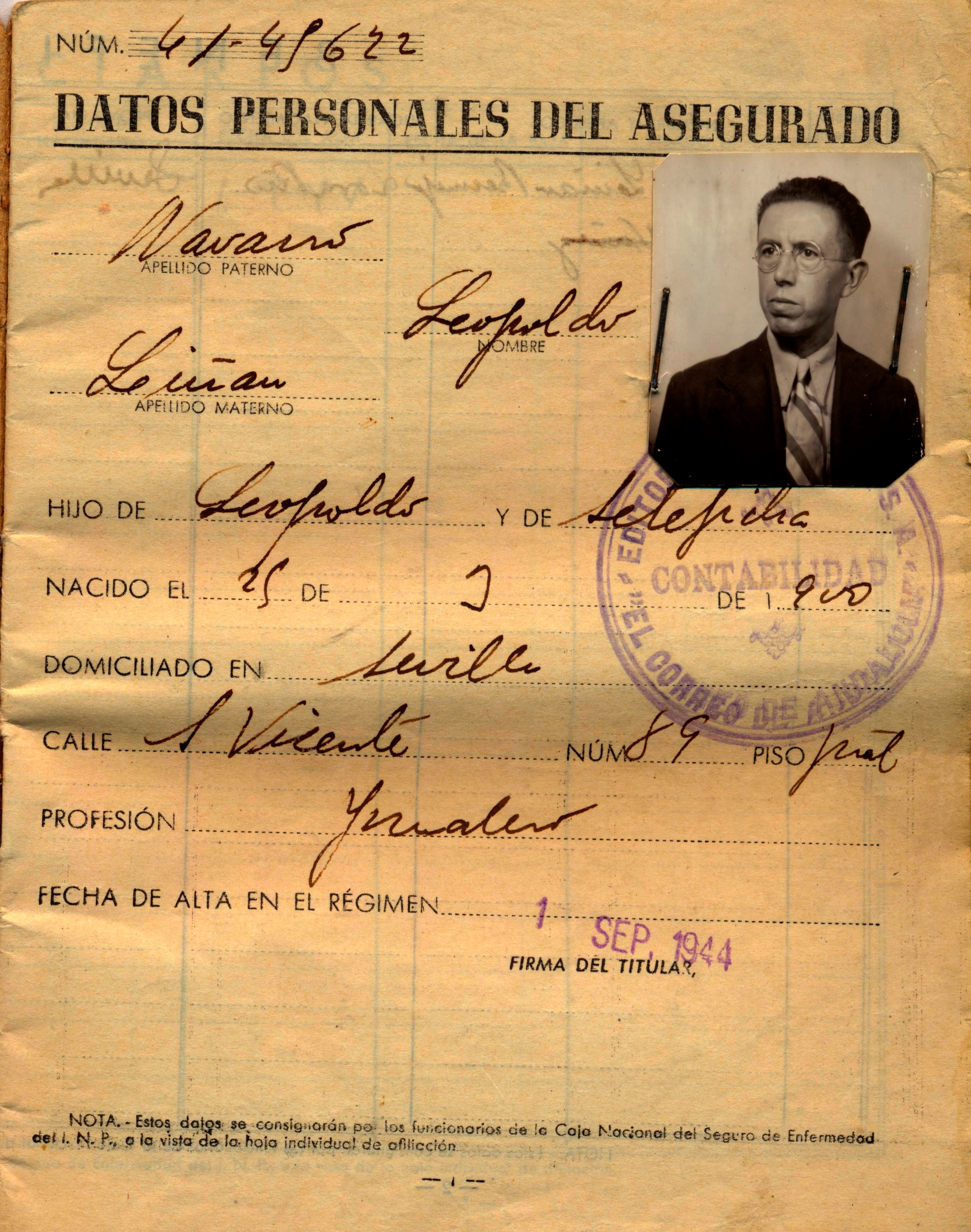
Compulsory Health Insurance Booklet. 1944

The Ministry of Labour continued to focus on another important element: social insurance. Continuing the work of Spanish governments since the beginning of the century, the Franco regime emphasized social insurance, notably the Compulsory Health Insurance (SOE) and the Compulsory Old Age and Disability Insurance (SOVI). At the same time, the Spanish People Charter was approved in 1945 and labour mutual societies were created.

From the 1960s onwards, efforts were made to give uniformity and unity to the State's protective action, and for this purpose the Law on the Social Security Bases of 1963 was approved. This law left behind the disorder and autonomy of the different instruments of the State and established a Social Security System headed by the Ministry of Labour and managed by a new type of government agency, the "Managing Entities", namely: the National Institute of Social Insurance and the Labour Mutual Societies.

The last labour laws of this period were enacted after the dictator's death. These included the 1976 Labour Relations Law, which sought to establish working conditions within a framework of freedom, and the 1977 Labour Relations Law, which restored two fundamental rights: freedom of association and the right to strike. This recognition laid the groundwork for the Constitution.

==== Return to democracy ====
Following the restoration of democracy, Social Security responsibilities were transferred in 1977 to the newly re-established Ministry of Health and Social Security, although they were regained four years later. During the years it was under the Ministry of Health, the Social Security institutional framework was completely transformed; most of the "managing entities" entities were either abolished. The National Institute of Social Insurance (1908) was divided in several other managing entities: National Institute of Social Security, the National Institute of Health, and the National Institute of Social Services. The concept of "common services" also emerged, such as the General Treasury of the Social Security and the Social Security IT Management Office. The National Employment Institute (INEM) was also created in 1978.

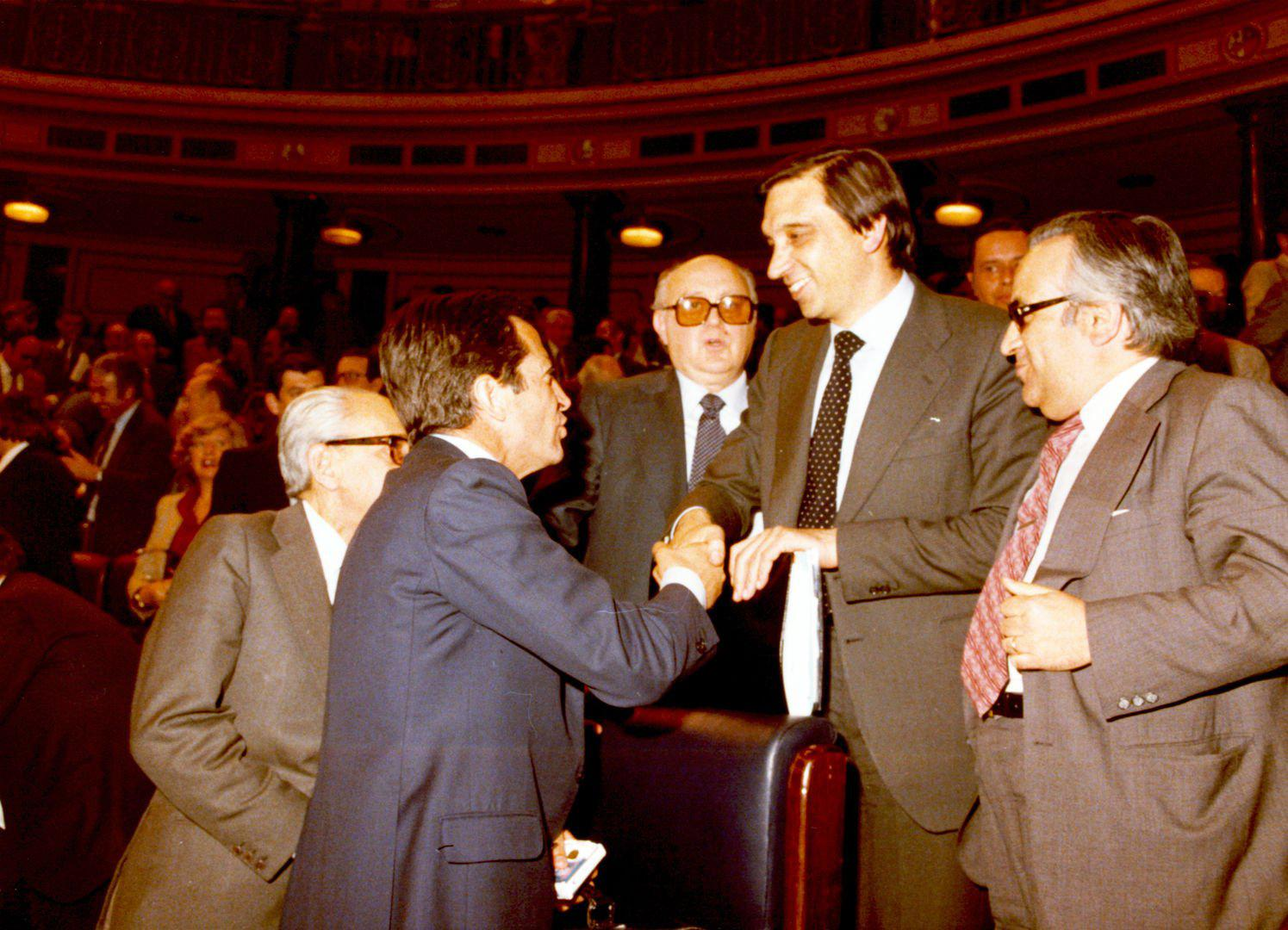
Adolfo Suárez congratulates the Labour Minister Rafael Calvo Ortega, after the approval of the Workers' Statute. 26 February 1980

The 1978 Constitution reinstated numerous labour rights and introduced a system of guarantees for their protection. Among these, Article 35.1 states that "all Spaniards have the duty to work and the right to work, to freely choose their profession or occupation, to advancement through work, and to sufficient remuneration to satisfy their needs and those of their family, without discrimination on the grounds of sex". To complement this article, the second paragraph of Article 35 established the constitutional mandate to approve a Workers' Statute.

Just three months after the inauguration of the third government of Adolfo Suárez, the cabinet presented the aforementioned bill to the Cortes, which was approved in February 1980. Since then, this law has been thoroughly amended twice, in 1995 and 2015, both being legal recasts to reflect the minor changes that have occurred in labour regulations over the years.

After a brief merger with the Ministry of Health in 1981, the two ministries separated again a few months later, as it was concluded that the problems facing the Spanish National Health System warranted a ministry entirely dedicated to that purpose; thus, Social Security returned to the Ministry of Labour. A decade later, the creation of the Ministry of Social Affairs resulted in the loss of social policies, including the Institute for the Elderly and Social Services (IMSERSO). However, both departments were merged in 1996, following the electoral victory of the People's Party, with the Institute of Women (INMUJER) and the Institute of Youth (INJUVE) being assigned to the Ministry of Labour for the first time. The following year, the National Institute for the Promotion of the Social Economy—created in 1991 to replace the Directorate-General for Cooperatives and Worker-Owned Companies—was abolished, and its functions were transferred to the Directorate-General for the Promotion of the Social Economy.

=== Present ===
Continuing with the reorganization of labour powers and agencies, in the last months of the second government of José María Aznar, in compliance with the mandate of Law 56/2003, of December 16, on Employment, the INEM became known as the State Public Employment Service (SEPE), since at this time most of the employment policies were decentralized to the autonomous communities and the current National Employment System was established.

In 2004, prime minister José Luis Rodríguez Zapatero integrated the immigration policy of the Ministry of the Interior into the Ministry of Labour and Social Affairs.

==== 2008–2014 financial crisis: labour reforms ====
In 2008, social policies were distributed between the Ministry of Education and the newly created Ministry of Equality, although in both cases they were transferred to the Ministry of Health between 2009 and 2010, respectively.

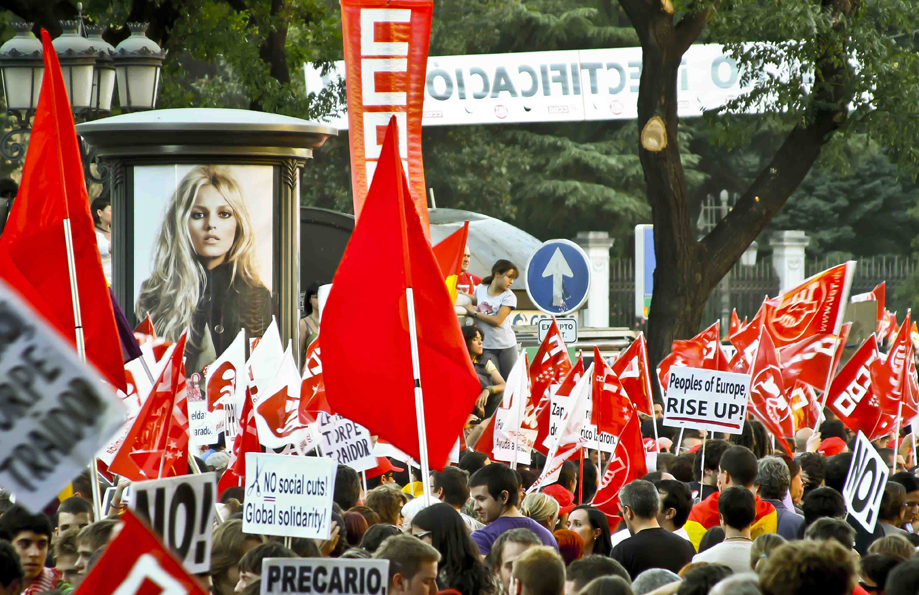
2010 Spanish general strike

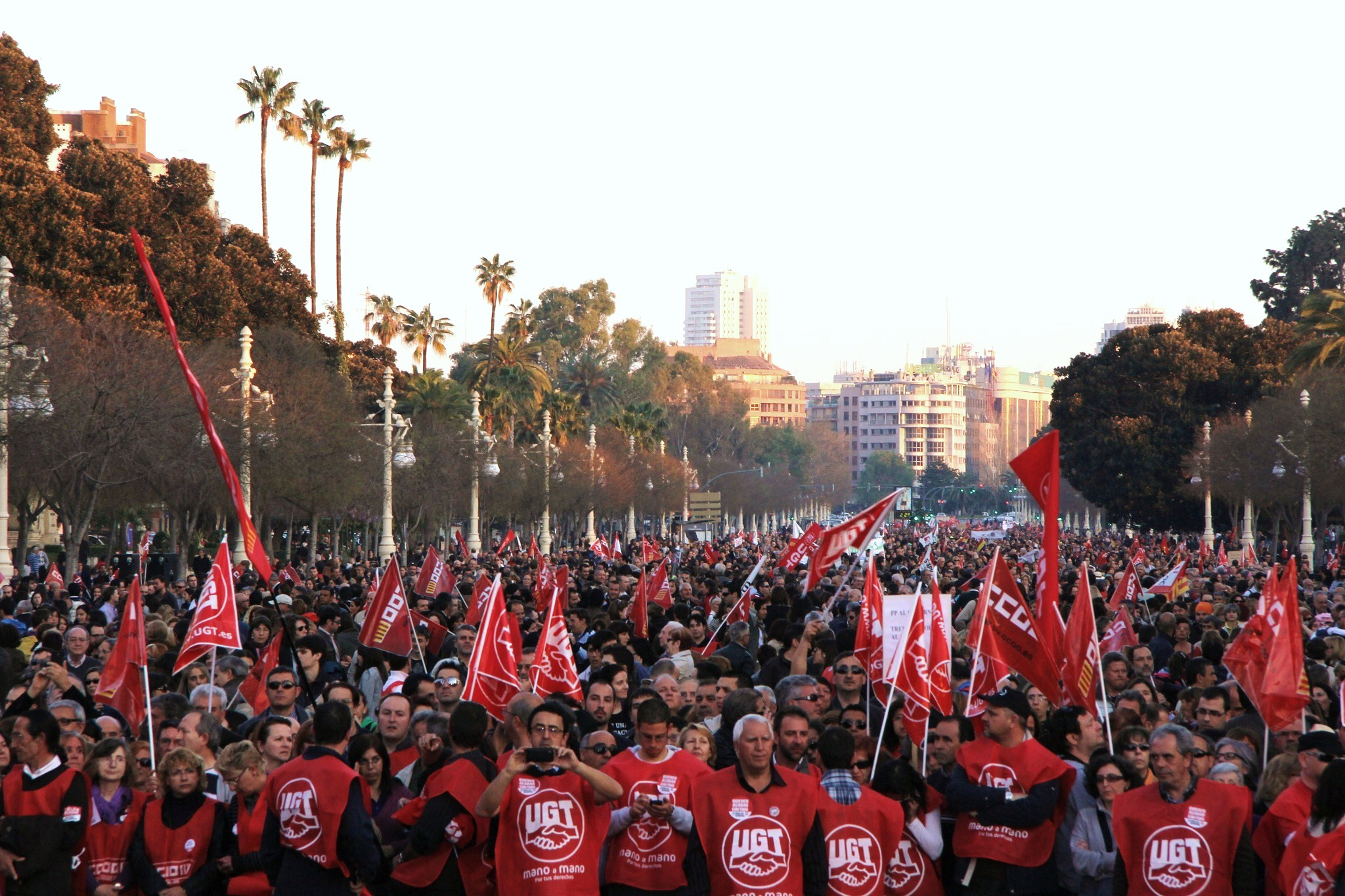
March 2012 Spanish general strike

During this period, the main effects of the economic crisis began to be felt, leading to important reforms such as the 2010 labour reform, which extended the "employment promotion contract" with a severance payment of 33 days of salary per year of work—which meant cheaper dismissals compared to the normal contract that had 45 days—, established the possibility of dismissal with less severance pay in objective cases of economic problems, greater control over the unemployed, harsher penalties for absenteeism, increased severance pay for temporary contracts—to discourage their use—and increased bonuses for companies for new hires, among other measures.

Following the 2011 general election, prime minister Mariano Rajoy replaced the term "Labour" with "Employment" for the first time; the ministry was then known as "Ministry of Employment and Social Security," although retaining the same powers.

This government, which from the opposition had criticized the ineffectiveness of the 2010 labour reform in achieving the goal of promoting employment, announced that it would carry out a new reform. As promised, a few months after its inauguration, the conservative government approved a new reform that, among other aspects, it equated private employment agencies with public ones to help the latter find jobs for the unemployed, reduced compensation in case of unfair dismissal from 45 to 33 days, made collective agreements more flexible—the conditions initially approved can be renegotiated at any time—and limited their post-expiry validity (meaning that they remain in force for only two years after expiration).

Following the vote of no confidence against Mariano Rajoy and the formation of the first government of Pedro Sánchez in June 2018, it became known as the "Ministry of Labour, Migration and Social Security".

==== Social Economy ====
In January 2020, prime minister Pedro Sánchez split the powers on foreigners, immigration and emigration, and those relating to social security from the Ministry of Labour, Migration and Social Security, which were integrated into the new Ministry of Inclusion, Social Security and Migration. It was the first time in forty years that Labour and Social Security were separated.

At the same time, the concept of "social economy" was included in the department's name, a concept defined in the 2011 Social Economy Law as "the set of economic and business activities, carried out in the private sphere by those entities that, in accordance with the principles set out in article 4, pursue either the collective interest of their members, or the general economic or social interest, or both".

As a result of the COVID-19 pandemic, in September 2020 the government issued a royal decree-law regulating remote work for the first time, a measure that was later ratified by the Cortes with the approval of the 2021 Remote Work Law.

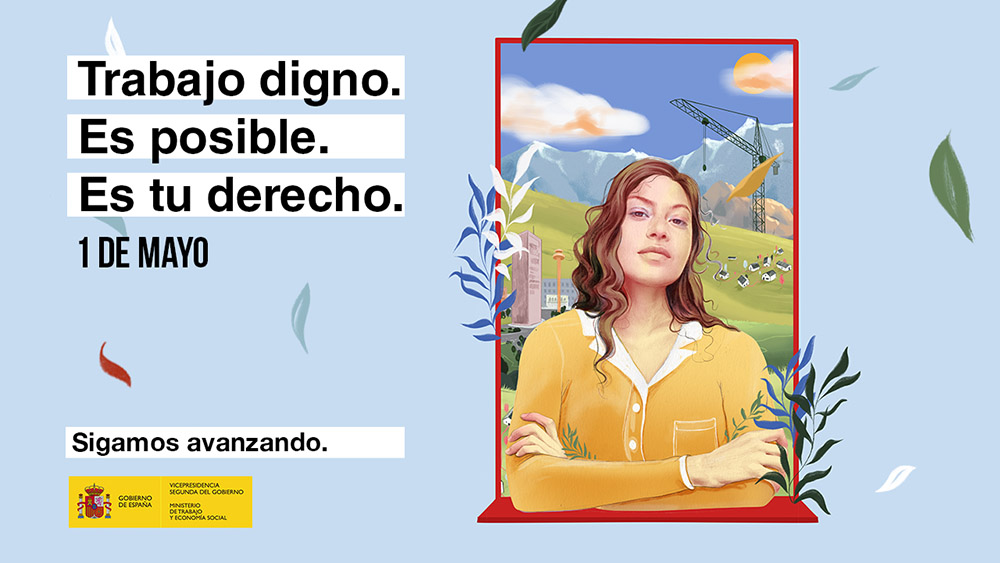
Promotional poster for International Workers' Day (1 May)

In 2022, the PSOE and Unidas Podemos coalition government approved a new labour reform, the third in twelve years. This new reform eliminated contracts for specific projects or services, fixed-term contracts were redefined, training contracts were reformed, and permanent contracts were strengthened with the aim of reducing temporary employment. It also reinstated the limitless post-expiry validity of collective bargaining agreements—which allows an agreement to remain in force without time limit until a new one is approved—a provision that had been eliminated in 2012. Furthermore, the preeminence of sectoral agreements over company agreements was established in matters of wages, and temporary layoff schemes (ERTEs) were modified, establishing two types: cyclical—with a maximum duration of one year due to economic difficulties—and sectoral—with a maximum duration of one year, with two six-month extensions to allow for retraining or professional transition in a specific economic sector. One of the most frequent criticisms the government received from unions and left-wing parties regarding this reform was its refusal to increase severance pay, which remained at 33 days.

That same year, the ministry fostered the formation of the Ibero-American Network of Labor Inspections, after a failed attempt in 2009. Similarly, the following year the ministry promoted the Ibero-American Network of Public Employment Services.

In 2023, the Cortes Generales approved a new Employment Law which, among other measures, transforms the State Public Employment Service (SEPE) into a state agency called the Spanish Employment Agency, which, in addition to managing funds for employment policies, is also given powers to design those same policies. At the end of this year, continuing with the policy of promoting the social economy, the prime minister created a Secretariat State for Social Economy that assumed the powers previously held by the Secretariat of State for Employment—remained as Secretariat of State for Labour—in relation to the social economy and corporate social responsibility.

== Organization ==
Organizational chart of the Spanish Ministry of Labour, May 2024

The minister of labour is the member of the Spanish Council of Ministers that leads the Ministry of Labour and Social Economy and, as such, establishes the government policy on these areas and appoints the government officials responsible for implementing it.

To exercise its powers, the minister is assisted by two secretaries of state, one for each area of the department, and an under-secretary, who runs the department on a day-to-day basis. Furthermore, the bulk of the Ministry's budget is managed by the State Public Employment Service, the main agency of the National Employment System and the coordinator of the regional employment agencies.

As of 2026, this is the organization of the Ministry:

Ministry Organization (2026)
Minister	Cabinet (Chief of Staff)
Minister	Economic and Social Council
Secretary of State for Labour	Directorate-General for Labour
Secretary of State for Labour	Directorate-General for Self-Employment
Secretary of State for Labour	Directorate-General for New Forms of Employment
Secretary of State for Labour	Administrative Unit of the European Social Fund
Secretary of State for Labour	Deputy Directorate-General for Programming and Evaluation of the European Social Fund
Secretary of State for Labour	Deputy Directorate-General for Statistics and Socio-Labour Analysis
Secretary of State for Labour	Labour and Social Security Inspectorate
Secretary of State for Labour	State Public Employment Service
Secretary of State for Labour	Salary Guarantee Fund
Secretary of State for Labour	National Institute for Safety and Health at Work
Secretary of State for Social Economy	Special Commissioner for Social Economy
Secretary of State for Social Economy	Directorate General for Social Economy and Corporate Social Responsibility
Under-Secretary	Technical General Secretariat
Under-Secretary	Deputy Directorate-General for Financial Management and Budget Office
Under-Secretary	Deputy Directorate-General for Human Resources and Inspection of Services
Under-Secretary	Administrative Office
Under-Secretary	Deputy Directorate-General for Information and Communication Technologies

== Headquarters ==
Currently, the Ministry of Labour and Social Economy is one of the ministries whose headquarters are located in the Nuevos Ministerios government complex. In addition to this main building, it has offices in the surrounding area that house some of its administrative bodies, and each of its agencies (except for the Labour and Social Security Inspectorate) has its own individual headquarters.

=== Former headquarters ===
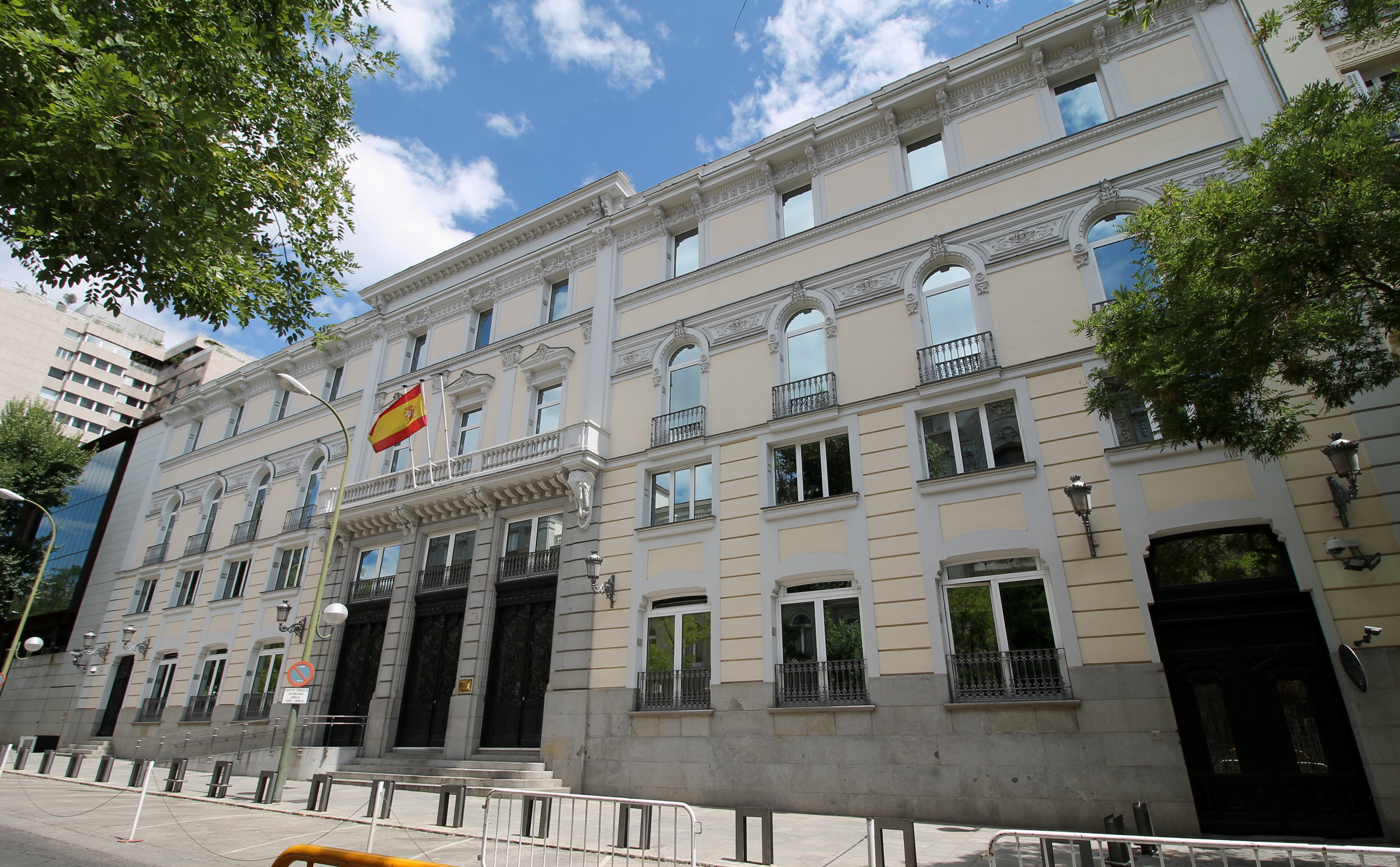
No. 8 Marqués de la Ensenada, the first headquarters of the ministry. Today it is the headquarters of the General Council of the Judiciary.

Although little is known about its early years, it is presumed that many of its services remained in the headquarters of their original departments, although some testimonies claim that around 1921 the Ministry was located on the first floor of the Palace of Villamejor.

The first headquarters of the Ministry of Labour was located at number 8 on Marqués de la Ensenada street, in Madrid. This building, constructed in the 1920s, stands on the site of the former Teatro Lírico, which was destroyed by fire in 1920. The department occupied it from 1922, when it rented some premises in the new building to house the ministry's services. Today, this building houses the headquarters of the General Council of the Judiciary (CGPJ).

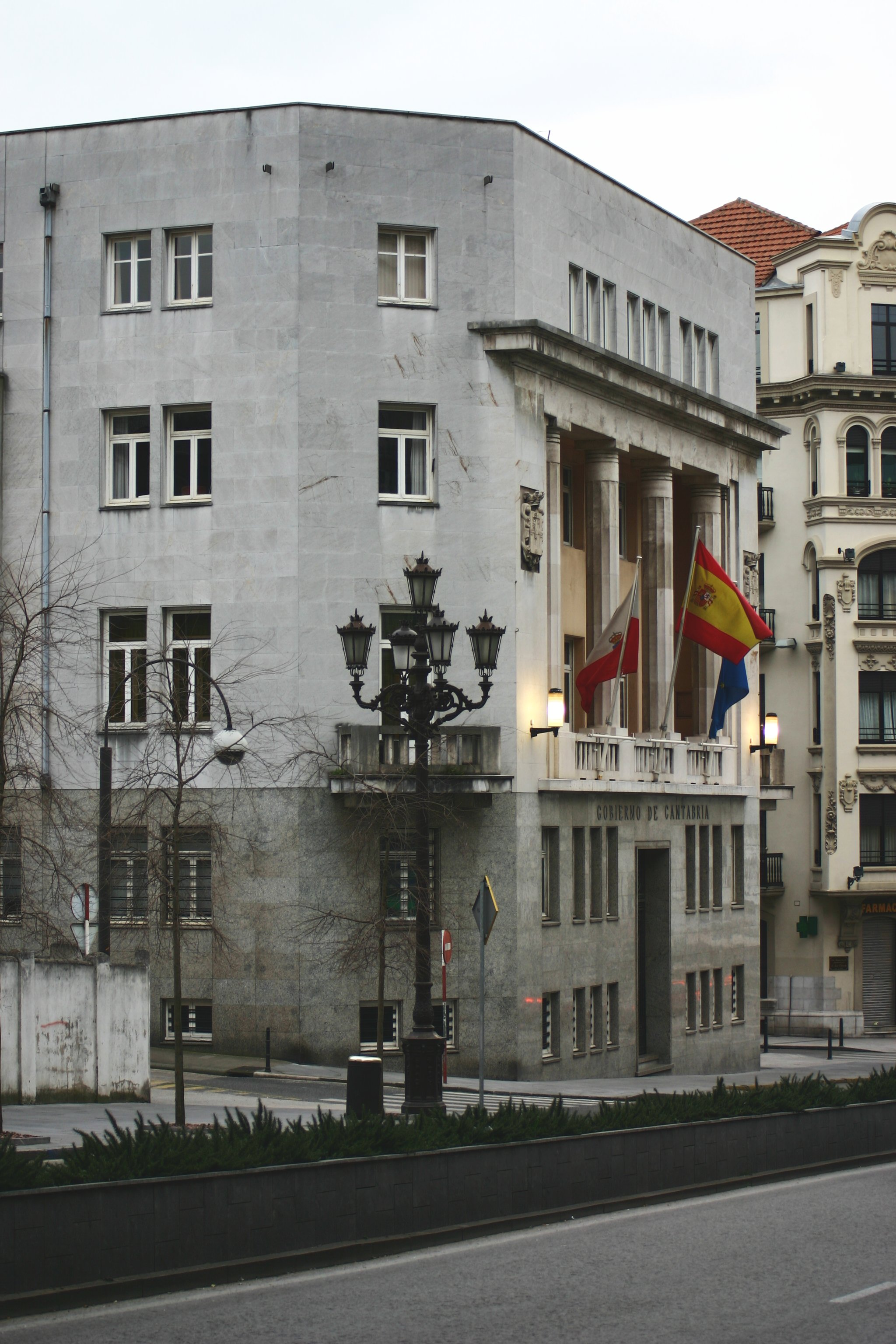
Former headquarters of the Government of Cantabria. During the Civil War, it housed the Rebel Ministry of Labour. It was demolished in 2009.

A few years later, in 1926, the Council of Ministers authorized the Minister of Labour, Trade and Industry, Eduardo Aunós, to hold a public competition to acquire a property in the capital to serve as the central ministerial headquarters. Thus, the State ended up accepting the offer of Luis de Morenés y García-Alesson, 1st Marquess of Bassecourt and Marquess consort of Argüeso, and bought two of his estates in Madrid. This palace is known today as the Palace of the Marquess of Argüeso and Bassecourt, and is, together with the Palace of the Counts of Casa Valencia, one of the two main headquarters of the Ministry of the Interior.

During the Civil War, the Republican Ministry of Labour and Health relocated to Valencia, settling at number 8 Marqués de Sotelo Avenue, now the headquarters of the Provincial Directorate of the General Treasury of the Social Security. As for the Rebel Ministry of Organization and Trade Union Action, it established its headquarters in the city of Santander, specifically in the building that had previously housed the Provincial Deputation of Santander and, later, the Government of Cantabria. This building was demolished in 2009.

As a result of the above, the installation of the Interior Ministry in the Palace of the Marquess of Argüeso and Bassecourt in 1939 led to the transfer of the Ministry of Labour to the Palace of Parcent—which today houses some services of the Ministry of Justice—, where it remained until the 1960s when it moved to its current headquarters in Nuevos Ministerios.

== Budget ==
In millions of euros (€)
1. Social protection and benefits 22,114.16 (76.8%)
2. Employment and training 6,247.26 (21.7%)
3. Regulation, inspection and labour relations 283.7 (0.99%)
4. General services 128.12 (0.44%)
5. Social economy and self-employment 16.65 (0.06%)
6. International cooperation and relations 1.2 (0.00%)

For fiscal year 2026, the Ministry of Labour and Social Economy has a consolidated budget of €28.79 billion. Of this amount, €149.81 million are directly managed by the ministry's central services while €28.64 billion are managed by its agencies.

The budget programs can be divided into six areas:

1. Social protection and benefits (Programs 223A, 224A & 251M), covering government benefits related to unemployment, wage guarantees in cases of employer insolvency or bankruptcy and in cases of activity cessation of self-employed workers.
2. Employment and training (241A & 241B), which aim to promote employment and workforce training.
3. Social economy and self-employment (241N & 241O), which promote specific types of business models (cooperatives, self-employment) and supervises everything related to corporate social responsibility.
4. International cooperation and relations (143A), which finances socio-labour actions related to bilateral—with countries—and multilateral (ILO and OECD) relations.
5. Administration, management and advisory bodies (281M & 912P), which finances the ministry's general administration services.
6. Regulation, inspection and labour relations (291A & 494M), focusing on labour inspection, compliance, and the regulation of working conditions and industrial relations.

In addition, Programme 000X (“Internal Transfers and Disbursements”) is excluded from the analysis, as it consists of transfers between public sector entities and would otherwise lead to double counting and distort the overall budget.

=== Audit ===
The Ministry's accounts, as well as those of its agencies, are internally audited by the Office of the Comptroller General of the State (IGAE), through a Delegated Comptroller's Office within the Department itself. Externally, the Court of Auditors is responsible for auditing expenditures. Likewise, the Congress of Deputies Committee on Labour, Social Economy, Inclusion, Social Security and Migration and the Senate Committee on Labour and Social Economy exercise political control over the accounts.

== See also ==
- Unemployment in Spain
- Unemployment benefits in Spain
- Medal of Merit in Labour

== Bibliography ==
- Cuesta, Josefina (2020). "El Ministerio de Trabajo en la II República española (1931-1939)" [The Ministry of Labour in the Second Spanish Republic (1931–1939)]. Sociología del Trabajo (in Spanish) (99): 185–203. doi:10.5209/stra.79034. eISSN 2603-9710. Archived from the original on 25 April 2023 – via Complutense University of Madrid.
- Pérez Salmón, María Dolores (2020). Federico Salmón Amorín. Una biografía política (1900-1936) [Federico Salmón Amorín. A political biography (1900–1936)] (in Spanish). Madrid: Catholic Association of Propagandists. ISBN 978-84-17385-66-8.
- Sánchez Recio, Glicerio (2002). "El sindicato vertical como instrumento político y económico del régimen franquista". Pasado y memoria: Revista de historia contemporánea (1): 5–37. eISSN 2386-4745. ISSN 1579-3311 – via Miguel de Cervantes Virtual Library.
- Molinero Ruiz, Carme (2013). "Falange y la construcción del régimen, 1939-1945. La búsqueda de unas bases sociales" [Falange and the construction of the regime, 1939-1945. The search for a social base] (PDF). Falange, las culturas políticas del fascismo en la España de Franco (1936-1975) (in Spanish). 1. ISBN 978-84-9911-216-9 – via Institución Fernando el Católico.
- González Murillo, Pedro (2021). "Franquismo social y Ministerio de Trabajo (1939-1957)" [Social Francoism and the Ministry of Labour (1939–1957)]. Sociología del Trabajo (in Spanish) (99): 185–220. doi:10.5209/stra.79035 – via Complutense University of Madrid.
