= Applicability =

Applicability may refer to:

- Direct applicability, concept of European Union constitutional law that regulations require no implementing legislation within individual member states
- Industrial applicability, a patentability requirement according to which a patent can only be granted for an invention which is susceptible of industrial application
- Applicability, element of the Code scaling, applicability, and uncertainty approach used to identify and quantify overall nuclear reactor uncertainties

== See also ==
- Applicability domain
- Acceptability
