= Labour and Social Security Inspectorate =

Spanish government agency

- Inspección de Trabajo y Seguridad Social
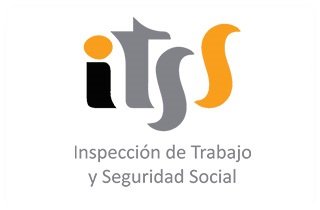

Agency overview
- Formed: March 1, 1906; 120 years ago
- Type: Autonomous agency
- Jurisdiction: Spanish government
- Headquarters: 63 Paseo de la Castellana Madrid
- Employees: +3,400 employees
- Annual budget: €206.4 million, 2023
- Agency executive: Cristina Fernández González, Director
- Parent department: Ministry of Labour
- Website: Inspectorate' Web Site(in Spanish)

The Labour and Social Security Inspectorate (ITSS) is a Spanish autonomous agency in charge of the control of the compliance with labour and social security legislation. It also offers technical advice and, where appropriate, conciliation, mediation and arbitration in these matters. The ITSS is, therefore, the apex of the Labour and Social Security Inspection System.

The law defines the matters of competences of the ITSS as "rules of social order". These rules, on which the ITSS exercises the functions of inspection and, where appropriate, sanction, cover all labour matters, prevention of occupational hazards, social security and social protection, labour placement, employment, vocational training for employment and unemployment protection, social economy, emigration, migratory movements and foreigners work and equal treatment and opportunities and non-discrimination in employment, among others.

The Inspection staff is made up of senior technical and national qualification career civil servants, belonging to the Labour and Social Security Inspectors Superior Corps and the Labour Sub-Inspector Corps. This staff is always attached to a public administration and, because Spain's decentralized system, this administration may be the State one or a regional one. The ITSS is currently made up by more than 3,200 employees, of which around 2,000 are inspectors and sub-inspectors.

The current Director of the Labour and Social Security Inspectorate is Cristina Fernandez Gonzalez, since January 2024.

== History ==
The 19th century is a key century for the labour legislation and work conditions. In Spain, with the Constitution of 1812 new labour rights are approved, such as the freedom of industrial establishment and freedom to choose an occupation. During the progressive biennium (1854-1856), social conflicts that already existed in the international sphere began to be replicated in the Iberian Península, with actions such as the 1855 general strike, the first general strike in Spain. It is then that it is begin to see the need to pass labour legislation that regulates the relations between employers and employees. The first Spanish labour law is the Benot Act of July 24, 1873, passed during the First Republic for the labour protection of children, with the main objective of facilitating their education.

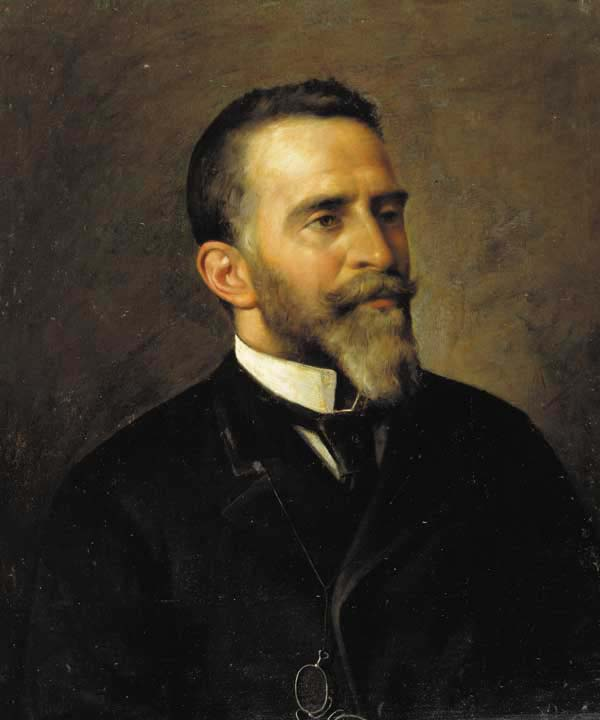
Portrait of Gumersindo de Azcárate. Azcárate was the chair of the Social Reforms Institute during the creation of the Inspectorate.

From 1874 to 1931, the bourbonic monarchical restoration takes place, approving in this period the Constitution of 1876. During the validity of this constitution there are important events for the working class, such as the emergence of the UGT in 1888 (PSOE trade union), the CNT trade union in 1910 and, at the same time, the first Socialist member of parliament in the Cortes Generales, and in 1921 the creation of the Communist Party. Those elements were translated into labour regulations by the State, and with this, commissions and institutes are created solely to study labour conditions and their possible reforms. At the governmental level, the Commission for Social Reforms (1885) and the Institute for Social Reforms (1903) are founded, the direct background of the Ministry of Labour (1920).

It will be from the Social Reform Institute where the idea of creating the Labour Inspectorate will come in 1906. Its first regulations, passed on March 1, it entrusted to the Inspectorate the monitoring of compliance with the incipient social legislation of the time (Work Accident Act of January 30, 1900, Work of Women and Minors Act of March 13, 1900, Sunday Rest Act of March 3, 1904, ...). During its early years it continues its development and expansion despite political problems and the Civil War.

An important extension of the powers of the Labour Inspectorate occurs in 1939 with the creation of the National Labour Inspectorate Corps and the consequent integration in the same of the Social Security Inspectorate and the Emigration Inspectorate. New integrations are subsequently produced as a result of the Labour Inspection Ordinance Act of 1962, affecting the Social Prevision Technical Inspectorate and the Labour Delegates.

In 1984 the Civil Service Reform Act reconfigured the Labour Inspectorate, named since 1981 Labour and Social Security Inspectorate, organizing the inspection function around two bodies, the Labour and Social Security Inspectors Superior Corps and that of Labour Comptrollers, as a management body. In 1985 the Inspectorate became a Directorate-General of the Ministry of Labour.

Finally, in 1997 and according to the new territorial organization of the State that emerged from the 1978 Constitution, the Labour and Social Security Inspection System was configured as an integrated institutional set, whose functions are exercised respecting the powers of the State and of the Autonomous Communities, reason why the conditions of participation of these regions in the development of the Labour and Social Security Inspection System are established. Consequently, this Law defines an institutional system for Labour and Social Security Inspection that is jointly established within the scope of the State and the Autonomous Communities, based on their respective competences and under the principle of inter-institutional collaboration. Likewise, Law 42/1997 creates, as a management body, the Labour and Social Security Sub-Inspectors Corps, which includes the Labour Comptrollers Corps, adapting and updating its inspection functions of support and collaboration within the Labour and Social Security Inspection System in which they are integrated.

In 2010, the central government transferred inspection powers to the Autonomous Community of Catalonia, and did the same with the Autonomous Community of the Basque Country in 2012. In 2015, an important novelty is produced, and that is that the Labour and Social Security Inspection System Act provides for the transformation of the Inspectorate through the granting of its own legal personality and differentiated from that of the government, by configuring it as an autonomous agency. However, this clause was not immediately applied, and it was not until early 2018 that the Directorate-General for Labour and Social Security Inspection is abolished and the current autonomous agency is created.

== Main bodies ==
The ITSS has two main bodies focused on directing and governing the agency: the Governing Board and the Director. In addition, it has a General Council to facilitate the institutional participation in the agency of Public Administrations and social groups.

=== Governing Council ===
The Governing Council is a collective body integrated by representatives of the General State Administration and the Autonomous Communities. It works in Plenary and Permanent Committee and is responsible for approving the general guidelines of action of the organization as well as approving the budgetary and personnel policies of the director.

It is integrated by the Minister of Labour, who chairs it, the Secretary of State for Labour—who presides over it when the minister is absent—, the Director of the Inspectorate, which is the Secretary of the Council, 17 representatives of the Autonomous Communities and 16 extra representatives of the different central government departments. To the Governing Council' meetings may attend, with voice but no vote, who are summoned by the same to inform about matters of their competence or specialty.

=== Director ===
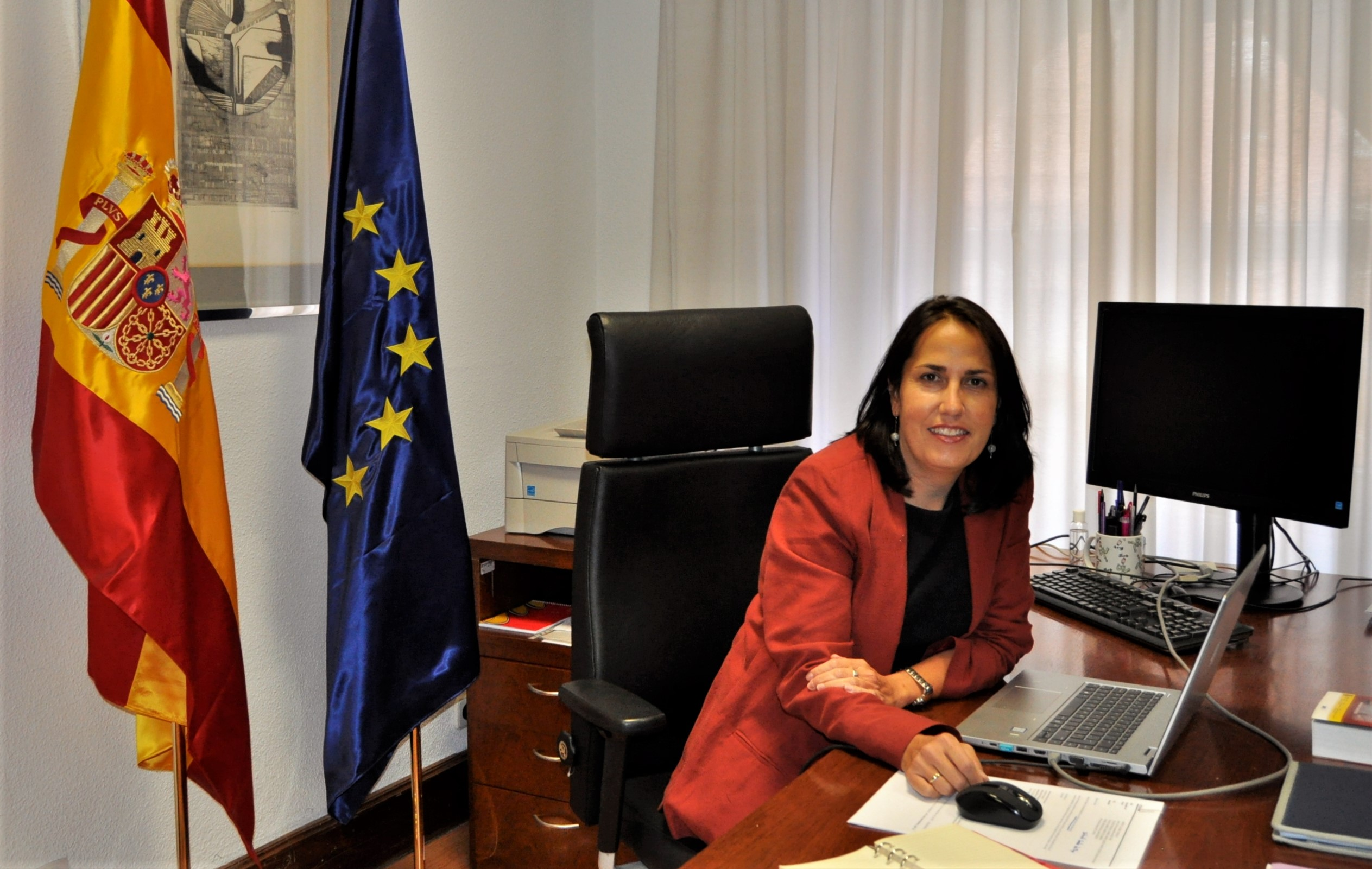
Cristina Fernández González, director of the agency since January 2024

The head of the ITSS, with rank of Director-General, is the Director. The director is appointed by royal decree, at the proposal of the Minister of Labour among career civil servants belonging to the Inspection Corps. The director is the official responsible for representing the agency, as well as directing and governing it. Likewise, the director is considered the Inspection's Central Authority that, according to section 4 of the Convention No. 81 of the International Labour Organization, is the authority in charge of monitoring and controlling the labour inspection system.

In cases of vacancy, absence or illness, the director of the agency is replaced by the Deputy Directors-General of his dependency, following the order established in the legislation, unless the director expressly establishes another order of substitution.

==== Advisory board ====
The Advisory Board of the Inspectorate is the advisory body to the director and it is integrated by the Special Director, the Territorial Directors and the heads of the departments of the ITSS. Other officials of the agency can also be members.

=== General Council ===
The General Council is the body of institutional participation to make it easy for the other public administrations and social groups to be present in the agency. The objective of the GC is to inform to its members of the agreements and proposals passed by the different ITSS departments, as well as to make proposals and recommendations.

It is integrated by representatives of the public administrations that make up the Governing Council (8), representatives of the most representative trade union organizations (8) and representatives of the most representative business organizations (8). The director of the agency chairs the General Council and it has three deputy chairs, one for the regional administrations and one for each social organization. It also has a secretary appointed by the chair among the officials of the Agency, who will attend the meetings with voice but without vote. All representatives have a four-year term.

== Structure ==
The Labour and Social Security Inspectorate has a central structure and a territorial structure.

=== Central structure ===
The central structure is composed of all those bodies with the rank of deputy directorates-general that depend directly on the Director of the Labour and Social Security Inspectorate, and they are:

- The National Anti-Fraud Office. It is the body in charge of promoting and coordinating the application of measures to fight unreported work, irregular employment, Social Security fraud and any others determined.
- The Deputy Directorate-General for the Coordination of the Inspection of the Labor Relations System. This department is the body responsible for carrying out the analysis of the offending behaviors as well as designing the strategies to prevent them; to coordinate the ITSS with the competent bodies of the Autonomous Communities, the AGE and other agencies; the design of work methods, investigation procedures and inspection check; and collaborate with the Foundation for the Prevention of Occupational Risks, in order to achieve better compliance with the purposes of the Foundation.
- The Deputy Directorate-General for Institutional Relations and Technical Assistance. It is in charge of the institutional relations, both national and international, of the ITSS as well as giving technical assistance to the different departments of the latter. It also prepares the public contests for the access to the Inspectorate's civil servants corps and it carries out internal audit works.
- The General Secretariat is the body responsible for the daily administration of the agency in relation to human resources, material resources, budget and its execution and the security of the agency.
- The School of the Labour and Social Security Inspectorate is the specialized agency of the organization in training and studies. It is responsible for preparing and designing the grade, masters and postgraduate training programs for Inspection's personnel and other public employees with inspection competencies.

=== Territorial structure ===
As established by the Labour and Social Security Inspection System Act, the agency is deployed throughout the national territory, and it is structured through:

- The Special Directorate. It is a single nation-wide competence department in charge of monitoring and demanding compliance with legal, regulatory and content regulations and collective agreements in all matters relating to labour relations, prevention of occupational hazards, Social Security, employment, migrations, and cooperatives and other formulas of social economy.
- The Territorial Directorates. There are 17, one for each Autonomous Community. The Territorial Directorates of the agency carry out the inspection actions of their competence and direct and coordinate the actions of the Provincial Inspectorates, within the territory of each Autonomous Community. In the one-province Autonomous Communities, the inspection device and its administrative services are common and with a unique structure for the Territorial Directorate and Provincial Inspectorate.
- The Provincial Inspectorates. There are 52, one for each province and in the Autonomous Cities of Ceuta and Melilla.
