= Spanish autonomous communities funding system =

Spanish autonomous communities funding system is the set of funds that each Spanish autonomous community administration is given to exert their competencies as the Spanish Constitution of 1978 obliges (article 156.1), following the solidarity principle (usually called as interterritorial solidarity) and being coordinated by the Ministry of the Treasury. This system is part of the Spanish tributary system.

The Constitution articles that define the fundamental characteristics of Spanish autonomous communities funding system are: 138, 156, 157 and 158.

Funds come from: taxes given by the General State Administration, the surcharges made over state taxes and other central state revenues plus the taxes created by the autonomous communities, the special contributions from them, "the transfers from the interterritorial compensation funds and other payments charged from the General State Budget, the yields coming from their own assets and the revenues coming from the application of private law and the product of credit operations made by the autonomous community administration". According to the article 157.1, these funds can't be expanded or denied to any autonomous community.

The principle of interterritorial solidarity, together with the other feature of the Spanish general fiscal system, the progressive characteristic of the tax system, should make autonomous communities with higher income per capita have a fiscal deficit while the autonomous communities with lower income per capita have a fiscal surplus situation. The concept of interterritorial solidarity (or in this case, between autonomous communities) has ambiguity issues because of the different interpretations it may have.

The Spanish Constitution concedes indirectly towards the autonomous communities the right to create their own budgets (article 153.d) with certain limitations: it must not block free circulation of products and services (article 157.2) and must not base the autonomous community's treasury in a privilege (article 138). José Juan Ferreiro Lapatza, professor of financial and tax law, interprets that a situation of privilege is given when "the inhabitants from an autonomous community do not pay or pay in a smaller proportion the state services that are provided to everyone, those inhabitants are enjoying, compared to everyone else, a privilege".

There are two types of autonomous communities funding systems:

- Agreement system (or quota system): This autonomous administrations collect and manage most of their taxes, transferring a part (a contribution) to the state due to the services provided in these autonomous communities and for solidarity. This system is employed in the Basque Country and Navarre. This system is legally possible due to the first amendment for the Constitution, making this system evade the consideration of privilege.

If the agreement is not reached, the state competencies are kept. Law 13/2002 lets postponing the quota in case the agreement is not reached until it is reached.

- General funding system: General State Administration keeps most of the collected funds plus the tributary management competencies, and redistributes the funds via transferences. It is regulated by the Organic Law of Autonomous Communities Funding. It is the type used in the remainder autonomous communities.

== History ==
Due to the lack of a closed definition of type of funding system given by the Constitution, it allows the funding system to evolve through time.

The general funding system type implied inequalities since the beginning of its application because "when the competencies where transferred there were [autonomous] communities where the presence of state was lower [than other autonomous communities], and when the resources for their funding was transferred taking into account the effective cost of the services to transfer, they were left with less resources, in a relative measurement, than other territories where the presence of public state services was greater la presència de serveis públics estatals era major".

28 February 1978 the first agreement was established, through a Royal Decree.

=== Effective cost type period (ca. 1978–1986) ===
In 1980 the Organic Law 8/1980 of Autonomous Communities Funding was approved, making the general type measure the cost of the benefits brought by the state services so the central administration would transfer monetary funds relinquishing some minor tribute. This was the first type of general funding system, which was employed until 1986.

During the following years, the measurement was made taking into account the increase of the cost. This type implied a problem to some autonomous communities (like the Valencian Community). This grievance was not even corrected during the following changes of the type of funding system.

=== Second type period (1987–1996) ===
The next type (1987–1996) abandoned the measurement of the effective cost. Instead, it measured several indicators (population, geographical dispersion, surface and others) and negotiated agreements. The autonomous communities did not take responsibility so they collected takes from their citizens.

=== Third type period (1997–2001) ===
Autonomous communities could collect part of the personal income tax (IRPF). Due to this, they held a shared responsibility with the central state towards the funding of their expenses.

One academic article published in 2003 explained that the measurement that was made since 1980 featured uncertainty in the conformity to the interterritorial solidarity principle.

In 2002 every autonomous community was equipped with competencies and had been transferred the education and health competencies. The responsibility that the autonomous communities held towards their citizens' social and economical matters was great.

=== Last types period (2002–2008; 2009 – present) ===
With the economic recession, the autonomous communities' budgets shrank. The last two types of funding system (2002-2008 and the one followed since 2009) had tried to correct its lack of harmony: they took into account the population per age sections (juvenile, young, adult and old). These types took into account the following three elements (following this order):

1. Total money destined to the group of autonomous communities as a whole. It considers the evolution of the spending in services provided by the autonomous communities and the agreements between the central administration and the autonomous communities.
2. The measurement of the "financial needs related to each autonomous community in relation to the others". Due to this, it considers indicators as the population per age sections and others indicators. It considers specific funds of diverse purposes. These specific funds originally tried to correct concrete issues, but their uses were deviated due to political uses.
3. The delimitation of the income sources for funding the measured needs during the former step. This sources are: the ones owned by the autonomous community (tributes collected from the citizen of the territory) and the compensatory transferences that try to equate the autonomous communities.

On 1 January 2002, Law 21/2001 came into effect. This law changed the type of the funding system.

On the 30th of September 2005 the Catalan Parliament approved a reform of its l'Statute of Autonomy of Catalonia through an organic law, modifying the funding system of the Government of Catalonia.

After long negotiations, the Spanish government presented a new type of funding system in July 2009 with the objective of correcting funding deficits that happened to the autonomous communities. The fiscal balance of Valencian Community with Spain improved insufficiently, according to the economist José Carlos Díez.

According to a study directed by a member of the Institut Valencià d'Investigacions Econòmiques, the differences between revenues during 2013 of the autonomous communities are conditioned by the general type of funding system. This funding system type has affected negatively for many years the Valencian Community, Catalonia and Balearic Islands. This type of system has drawn controversy several times being the target of negative criticism by different people and organizations. Both the Minister of Treasury from then, Cristóbal Montoro, and the responsible at autonomous community level of treasury of Valencian Community, Clara Ferrando, have affirmed that the Valencian Country is underfunded due to the autonomous community funding system type.

Núria Bosch defended that the autonomous community funding system to be reformed, making it taking into account the living costs of the autonomous community and that the ordinality principle be followed. This principle means "establishing one partial leveling: the autonomous communities with greater fiscal capacity lose resources due to the redistribution, but after this redistribution they keep being over the average value, and the autonomous communities with lesser fiscal capacity win fiscal capacity, but being under the average value."

The unequal autonomous community funding system has the consequence that the disadvantaged autonomous communities are made to increase the tributes for increasing its incomes while the advantaged ones reduce their taxes, being the situation that they can be accused of unfair competition at a fiscal level. The fact that there are two possible ways of calculating fiscal balances for determining the grade of harmony of the funding system has caused controversy between Madrid's government and Catalonia's. The fiscal balance of the Valencian Community in both measurement methods is loss-making.

In 2016, during an economists meet-up regarding the way the autonomous community funding system, there was a proposal to the central administration to forgive debts from the Fund of Autonomous Liquidity to some autonomous communities in exchange for accepting a new type of funding system.

Autonomous communities presidents that were affiliated to the political party PSOE and some of the presidents affiliated to the Spanish Popular Party thought the funding system was not harmonious. In 2017, the Conference of Presidents (that gathers the presidents of the autonomous communities that employ the regular type, but that year Catalonia's President, Carles Puigdemont, did not participate) implied a pledge to reform the autonomous community funding system before 2018.

== Bibliography ==
- Cucarella, Vicent (2015). El finançament valencià: de la submissió al canvi necessari. Alzira (Spain): Bromera. ISBN 978-84-9026-323-5.
- Ferreiro Lapatza, José Juan (2006). "El sistema de finançament autonòmic de Catalunya: Estatut i Constitució". Revista catalana de dret públic. 32: 1–21.
- Domínguez Zorrero, Manuel; Sánchez Pino, Antonio J. (2003). "La solidaridad interterritorial y la financiación autonómica". Revista de Estudios Regionales. 66: 153–165.
