= Organización Corporativa Nacional =

1926 Spanish state institution

The National Corporate Organization (OCN, from Spanish Organización Corporativa Nacional) was a Spanish state institution established in November 1926 under the Dictatorship of Primo de Rivera to regulate labor relations and working conditions based on corporatism rooted in Catholic social teaching, while also influenced by the corporatism of Fascist Italy. Its primary architect was Eduardo Aunós, the Minister of Labor during the Civil Directorate, who envisioned the OCN as an alternative to both liberalism and socialism. The OCN's foundation consisted of Joint Committees (Comités Paritarios), each comprising five worker representatives and five employer representatives for each trade or profession, chaired by a government appointee, tasked with establishing Work Regulations (Bases de Trabajo) to which labor contracts had to conform.

According to historian Eduardo González Calleja, "the OCN under the Dictatorship struck a middle ground between free association unionism and the mandatory single unionism of totalitarian regimes. However, Aunós's vision of building a fully corporatist state, where labor corporations would become the nation's highest legislative body, was not fully embraced by the regime."

== Background ==
Primo de Rivera aimed to eliminate trade unions that negotiated working conditions with employers and used tactics like strikes to achieve their goals. He sought to replace them with "unions" limited to welfare, education, and disciplining their members, acting as intermediaries to select worker representatives for the joint committees of the proposed corporations for various trades and professions. Shortly after his coup d'état, Primo de Rivera stated: "Workers' associations, yes, for cultural, protective, and mutual aid purposes, and even for sound politics, but not for resistance and conflict with production." This led to harsh repression of the CNT, while the UGT was offered representation in the corporatist bodies.

The main proponent of the corporatist project, Eduardo Aunós, a former member of the Lliga Regionalista and advocate of social Catholicism, was familiar with Italian fascist corporatism. However, according to Eduardo González Calleja, "the philosophy underpinning" his project "was markedly different." "Aunós, closer to the Catholic social tradition of class integration, had no intention of turning unions into a tool for mass regimentation. Instead, their role was to regulate working conditions and prevent strikes. Unlike Italian corporatism, where employer-worker unions were coercively imposed from above within a totalitarian state (entailing the dissolution of class-based unions and their replacement by fascist bureaucracy), in Spain, mixed employer-worker groups operated hierarchically with powers delegated by the state. Workers' unions retained their natural sphere of action and voluntary character if they operated within the corporatist framework..." Historian Ángeles Barrio notes that the ultimate goal of the corporatist organization was to ensure social peace through interventionist labor policies, termed "social corporatism."

== Structure ==
The OCN was structured in three tiers: the first consisted of Joint Committees (Comités Paritarios); the second comprised Provincial Mixed Commissions; and the third included the Corporation Councils for each trade, forming the highest body. Representation of employers and workers was equal—parity-based—at each level.

The Decree of November 26, 1926, establishing the OCN, stated that the "primary purpose" of local Joint Committees was to "regulate the life of the profession or group of professionals concerned" by "determining the regulations for their trade or profession, preventing industrial conflicts, resolving them if they arise, settling individual disputes between employers and workers, organizing Labor Exchanges, and performing other social functions benefiting the respective profession." Each committee included five worker representatives, elected by legal associations (excluding unassociated workers), five employer representatives, a president, and a vice-president appointed by the civil governor from outside the sector.

Joint Committees could voluntarily form an intermediate body called the Local Mixed Commission, with normative (approving committee agreements and regulating labor contracts), preventive (resolving labor disputes through arbitration), jurisdictional (handling appeals on labor law violations), welfare (organizing Labor Exchanges to combat unemployment), and punitive functions. These commissions included three worker and three employer representatives from each participating Joint Committee.

Joint Committees for each trade formed national Corporation Councils, the "central body of the profession." These comprised eight worker and eight employer representatives elected by the Joint Committees, plus a president and vice-president appointed by the Ministry of Labour. According to Eduardo González Calleja, they "handled claims regarding general agreements affecting the industry; set work regulations for norms or contracts binding professionals across multiple localities or regions; resolved appeals against local or interlocal Joint Committee agreements; and advised the government on improving social legislation, organizing congresses, and other activities." The Councils elected seven worker and seven employer representatives to the Delegated Commission of Councils, the "immediate advisory body to the Ministry of Labour and Welfare."

=== UGT Participation ===
Primo de Rivera offered the UGT, the socialist union, representation of the working class in the OCN, causing a split among socialists. Julián Besteiro, Francisco Largo Caballero, and Manuel Llaneza supported collaboration, while Indalecio Prieto and Fernando de los Ríos opposed it. The former prevailed, leading to socialist integration into the Labour Council, which absorbed the Institute of Social Reforms, and Largo Caballero's appointment to the Council of State, prompting Prieto's resignation from the PSOE executive. The UGT then joined the OCN, justifying participation by arguing that it did not restrict the right to strike and that worker representative elections in Joint Committees were democratic.

According to historian Ángeles Barrio, "Primo de Rivera's plan offered the UGT advantages for expanding its union base and enhancing its representativeness in labor relations, which it had been contesting with the CNT since the early 20th century." Eduardo González Calleja adds that "integration into the Dictatorship's corporatism was a legal tool for improving workers' conditions within a gradualist strategy toward socialism."

The UGT secured about 60% of worker representation in Joint Committees and an even higher share in the upper tiers. However, its membership grew only 10%, from 211,000 in 1924 to 235,000 in 1928, while the PSOE increased from 8,000 to about 13,000 members by 1929.

The OCN's implementation varied widely. It succeeded in industrial sectors with skilled workers and urban service sectors. By early 1930, there were 460 Joint Committees, with 250 in formation, which had approved 71 Work Regulations and represented over one million workers.

== Consequences ==
The Joint Committee system significantly reduced labor conflicts, but strikes reemerged in the Dictatorship's final two years as the economy worsened. The regime responded with repression, such as during the Seville construction strike from August 7–18, 1928, where the civil governor threatened strikers with exile. The UGT also faced repression, with 93 of its centers closed by the government.

From 1928, employers and the Sindicatos Libres criticized the OCN and Joint Committees as "statist" and "centralist." By late 1928, business organizations openly opposed the OCN, demanding the dissolution or reform of Joint Committees to limit them to conciliation and arbitration, excluding labor regulation. Eduardo González Calleja notes that the OCN "definitively lost the support of conservative classes, who saw Primo de Rivera's paternalism as a direct threat to their interests."

== Bibliography ==
- Barrio Alonso, Ángeles (2004). La modernización de España (1917-1939). Política y sociedad (in Spanish). Madrid: Síntesis. ISBN 84-9756-223-2.
- Ben-Ami, Shlomo (2012) [1983]. El cirujano de hierro. La dictadura de Primo de Rivera (1923-1930) [Fascism from Above: Dictatorship of Primo de Rivera in Spain] (in Spanish). Barcelona: RBA. pp. 103–109. ISBN 978-84-9006-161-9.
- García Queipo de Llano, Genoveva (1997). El reinado de Alfonso XIII. La modernización fallida (in Spanish). Madrid: Historia 16. ISBN 84-7679-318-9.
- González Calleja, Eduardo (2005). La España de Primo de Rivera. La modernización autoritaria 1923-1930 (in Spanish). Madrid: Alianza Editorial. ISBN 84-206-4724-1.
- Tavera, Susanna (1984). "Els anarcosindicalistes catalans i la dictadura". L'Avenç (in Catalan) (72).
