= Public Administration of Spain =

Governmental apparatus that manages the Spanish public interests

The Public Administration of Spain is the governmental apparatus that manages the Spanish public interests.

The Constitution of 1978 declares in article 103.1 that the Public Administration serves objectively the general interests and acts in accordance with the principles of efficiency, hierarchy, decentralization, deconcentration and coordination, with full submission to the Law.

The Law 40/2015, of October 2, about the Juridical Regime of the Public Sector, establish that are Public Administration the General State Administration, the Administrations of the Autonomous Communities, the Entities that integrate the Local Administration, as well as the public organisms and the entities of public law.

The structure of the Public Administration of Spain is composed of many Administrations, which can be divided into three groups: Territorial administrations (this are the administrations that needs territory to exist like the General State Administration), the Instrumental or Institutional Administrations (the key to exist is the personnel) and the Corporative Administrations (group of people of the same guild that sometimes they do activities of a public nature).

The Public administrations, in their task of satisfying the general interest, hold a series of exorbitant powers with respect to legal persons of a private nature. As a counterweight to such exorbitant powers, Administrations are subject to a set of limits and guarantees of the rule of law (submission to the law, judicial review, property guarantees, etc.).

== Regulation ==
=== Basic regulation ===
The main axis of the basic regulation of the Public Administration is the Law 39/2015, of October 1, about the Common Administrative Process of the Public Administrations and Law 40/2015, of October 2, about the Juridical Regime of the Public Sector.

However, other laws that affect all the Public Administrations are Law 33/2003, about the Patrimony of the Public Administrations, Law 38/2003, about Public Subsidies, the Royal Legislative Decree 5/2015, about the Basic Statute of the Public Employee and Royal Legislative Decree 3/2011, about Public Sector Contracts.

=== Development regulation ===
Apart from the bases, there are other laws that develop and implement the previous ones like Law 6/1997, about Organization and Functioning of the General State Administration and Law 50/1997, of November 27, about the Government.

In the autonomous field, the Administrations of the Autonomous Communities are subject to their respective autonomous laws, in development of the basic state regulation mentioned above. Local administrations (such as a town hall) do not have legislative power but regulatory authority.

== Organization ==
The Spanish Public Administrations has a decentralized character as the Constitution says. There are not a hierarchy criterion between administrations but a competencial criterion. This means that every administration has its competencies and another administration can not influence them because it is not competent. There are around 10,000 public administrations in Spain.

=== Territorial administrations ===
Administrations, depending on the territory in which they are competent, are classified into three levels. The first level is the General State Administration which competencies spread throughout the country. The second level is made up of the different Autonomous Administrations. Its competences cover the territory of the corresponding Autonomous Community. Finally, the third level are the Local Administrations develop their powers over the corresponding municipal or provincial term, depending on whether it is a Municipality or a Province.

It must be understood that the three levels differ because they are legally different, insofar as each one has its own legal personality. It is what is known as public entity, in front of the internal structure of the same, the so-called organs, considered as each of the functional units of the public entity.

=== Instrumental or Institutional administrations ===
Together with the three territorial administrative levels, there is an extremely heterogeneous group of Administrations with a purely instrumental or institutional character (Institutional Administration), dependent on a parent administration. The plurality of territorial administrations allows them to be created with their own administrative legal personality, different from the parent administration, for the exercise of certain competences. Unlike the parent or creative administration, which has a political character, the instrumental or institutional administration has a strong bureaucratic character.

== Patrimony ==
The patrimony of the Administration has its essential regulation in the article 132 of the Constitution, as well as in the Law 33/2003, of November 3, of the Patrimony of the Public Administrations. The assets and rights of said Administrations may be classified, according to article 4 of Law 33/2003, in public domain goods and private domain goods.

The money, securities, credits and other financial resources of its finances are not considered patrimony of the Administration nor, in the case of public business entities and similar entities dependent on the autonomous communities or local corporations, the resources constituting their treasury.

=== Public domain goods ===
Public domain assets are those that are publicly owned but are used for general use or public service. Public property is also considered to be the dependencies and offices of State bodies, as well as the maritime-terrestrial zone, the beaches, the territorial sea and the natural resources of the economic zone and the continental shelf.

=== Private domain goods ===
Patrimonial assets or private domain are all those assets owned by the state that do not fall within the category of public domain assets. In this way, leasing rights, securities representing shares and shares in the capital of commercial companies or of bonds issued by them, as well as futures and options contracts whose underlying assets consist of shares or participations in commercial entities, incorporeal property rights, and rights of any nature arising from the ownership of the assets and economic rights.

=== Special Properties ===
==== Communal goods ====
The communal goods are assigned to a general use and use by the neighbors of a certain municipality. The Town Hall and neighbors are co-owners of the property, having the right to use and enjoy direct and simultaneous neighborhood, whenever possible. If this is not the case, local ordinances and custom will determine the regime of use and use of communal property.

==== Neighborhood forests in common hand ====
The neighborhood forests in common hand are a special category of property, whose ownership and use corresponds to those who are at any moment neighbors of a certain place (without the intervention of the Town Hall). The management will also be carried out by these through neighborhood assemblies.

==== National Heritage ====
The National Heritage is constituted by goods and rights reserved for the use and enjoyment of the members of the Royal House. They have a marked public domain, and an intense protection that makes them more inalienable than the common public domain goods.

There is no assumption that the assets and rights of the National Heritage can be removed from their public domain character to be converted into patrimonial assets (private law) and subsequently alienated.

== Public employment ==
Public employment comprises all the cases in which the Administration makes use of natural persons so that, in return for remuneration, they work for the account of the body or entity to which they are attached. The basic regulations are found in Law 5/2005, of April 12, about the Basic Statute of the Public Employee. Four general classes of public employees are regulated: career officials, interim officials, labor staff and eventual staff.

=== Career officials ===
The backbone of public employment rests on career officials, people linked to the Administration by a statutory relationship. Their access to the public function is carried out by opposition or competition (such as via exams and through open competition for vacancies), and their separation is limited to certain cases contemplated in the legislation.

=== Interim officials ===
The Interim officials or Temporary officials enjoy, as well as career officials, a statutory relationship with the Administration. His access and separation from the public service also follow the same guidelines, differing from the career official in the provisional character, as opposed to the alleged stability of the former.

=== Labor staff ===
The massive incorporation of labor staff in the service of the Public Administration is a relatively recent phenomenon. Its relationship with the Administration is not statutory, like that of the civil servants, but by contract. Its legal regime is governed by the rules of administrative law, something that does not preclude the application of the common labor law regime. In its contracting and dismissal, the principles of equality, publicity, merit and capacity must continue to be respected.

The Administration can not freely contract labor staff, but must adjust to the jobs that the law allows.

=== Eventual staff ===
Eventual staff are temporary public employees who have been appointed on a discretionary basis to perform a series of special functions or advice in the administrative apparatus of the State. Their general character is of non-permanent workers and they can be fired freely by the authority of which they depend or that made his appointment. In any case, they cease when the authority they consult is ceased.

== Administrative Procedure ==
The Public Administration governs its action on the basis of a series of rules that coercively impose a procedure, making administrative acts subject to a ritual form. Both the decisions taken and the way in which they are carried out must be carried out through formal procedures, a concept inherited from French legal doctrine.

Among the functions of the administrative procedure, it is worth mentioning its role as a source of administrative predictability. In this way, it is considered desirable that the performance of the Administration is moderately predictable, for the sake of legal certainty. On the other hand, imposing a series of formal guidelines reduces the spaces in which the professional officials must act in an excessively creative way (something typical of positions of political trust), with the consequent reduction of arbitrariness in the management of Public affairs. By regulating the procedure, it will be possible to improve the effectiveness and efficiency of administrative action without affecting labor pressures, which are possible in the private organization, but completely unthinkable in a contemporary Public Administration that operates on a bureaucratic and regulated basis, safe from the changes that come with the political future.

== Public Procurement Regime ==
The public administration usually uses the contracting mechanism with individuals to carry out an immense variety of tasks. However, the contracting regime differs from that provided for contracting between individuals, traditionally governed by civil law. When the administration acts as a contractor, a specific contracting regime must be used, in which administrative law plays a fundamental and indispensable role.

Royal Legislative Decree 3/2011, about Contracts of the public sector is responsible for regulating public procurement, guaranteeing the principles of free access to tender, publicity and transparency of the procedure, equality of treatment between candidates and efficiency in public expenditure. To ensure the latter, a prior definition of the need to satisfy, free competition between tenderers, and the choice of the most economically advantageous tender are required.

== Patrimonial liability regime ==
The Public Administration of Spain responds patrimonially of certain type of damages that produce incidentally as a consequence of the administrative action. The principle of patrimonial guarantee of the individual against the Administration is consecrated by the Spanish Constitution, specifically in article 106.

=== Characteristics ===
The administrative responsibility is complete, so that it covers all the damages produced by any public power, not only the Administration proper. It is also a direct responsibility, so that the injured party will not have to go against the official who has performed the harmful action, but against the Administration itself, directly, and in no case subsidiary. The Administration, in turn, may punish the official in case of dolus, negligence or guilt.

=== Requirements ===
==== Redeemable Injury ====
One of the most basic presupposition for which there is responsibility on the part of the Administration is the existence of a qualified damage to the property or rights of a natural or legal person. Point out that not only refers to pecuniary goods, but also of another nature, such as moral damages, which in the case will also involve a pecuniary compensation.

Among the qualities that administrative damage must meet in order to comply with this requirement, it is necessary to emphasize, first of all, the illegality of the action of the Administration. Unlike the regime of responsibility regulated in the Civil Code, where the illegality occurs when there is fraud or guilt, in the system of objective responsibility of the Administration, the criterion of illegality focuses on the existence or nonexistence of a duty to support the damage that laws can attribute to subjects. If the victim of administrative damage had no duty to bear it, the injury will be unlawful. Otherwise, the responsibility of the Administration will not arise, and the private individual will be responsible for the damage (it will be the case of taxes, in which the subject suffers property damage, but as a consequence of a law that empowers the Public authority to effect such an injury, and therefore exempts it from liability.)

The experts also speak of the need for the damage to be effective, referring to current and actual damages, and ruling out compensation for future or merely possible damages. Similarly, there is no liability when the damage consists in the mere frustration of expectations, provided that such expectations do not have a highly tangible probability of becoming an increase in property or rights.

On the other hand, the damage must be economically evaluable. However, this does not mean that only damage to property or property rights is compensated, because in a conventional way, personal and moral damage (pretium doloris) can also be assessed.

The damage must be individualized, it may be a single person or a small group, but never a group of such magnitude that can not be concretized who receive the damage.

==== Imputation of injury ====
The damage must have been produced by an official or employee of the Administration, or by one of the organs of political trust. In addition, it must occur as a result of acting within the public functions performed by such persons. However, damages caused by contractors and concessionaires of the Administration are excluded, unless the injury was caused by a clause imposed by the latter, so that the individual was obliged to cause the damage in question. Likewise, exceptions are included in which a professional with public functions responds personally, as may be the case of the notary.

On the other hand, analyzing the formal characteristics of the damage, it is necessary to emphasize that four types of actions (and omissions) can be found. Thus, damage can come from the regulatory activity of the Administration, some of its administrative acts, a purely material administrative action or the inactivity of the Administration.

==== Causal link ====
The cause-effect relationship seems to be an obvious and simple requirement in the framework of the liability of the Public Administration for damages in its action. However, the causes of harm are often not unique, nor are they clearly related. Throughout history, three different theories have been applied, focused essentially on resolving cases in which there is a concurrence of causes, which by the way, are the most common assumptions.

At first, the theory of exclusive causality predominated, which only held the Administration responsible when its performance was the sole and exclusive cause of the injury. The assumptions in which the Administration is the exclusive cause of harm are very small, and the theory was extremely advantageous for the public body, since it rarely had to compensate.

In later moments the theory of equivalence of the conditions would be applied, which affirmed that all the factors that caused the injury have equal importance, taking into account that the absence of any of them would have meant the absence of such an injury. It concluded that the total compensation could be demanded from any of the causal sources that caused the damage, having to repeat the defendant against the other causes. With this, a kind of tacit solidarity was established in which the interest of the damaged subject prevailed, in spite of the arbitrariness of the system.

Finally, the theory of adequate causality, in which the corresponding court selects from among the causes that is suitable to provoke the injury, and decisive for it to occur. The reparation of damage is still given absolute priority, although on this occasion, the person causing the damage, who pays the total compensation and repeats it against the other offenders, is not arbitrarily selected, but based on the degree to which acting involved in the production of the lesion.

Among the cases in which there is a concurrence of causes, three types may be mentioned. First, when the victim has contributed in causing the damage, the compensation of the Administration was reduced in equal proportion to the degree of intervention of the injured subject. If there is intentionality or gross negligence in the action of the victim, the Administration does not have to compensate. In addition, full compensation is allowed for cases where the administrative action was notoriously disproportionate (a protest in which the riot police carried fire with the lethal ammunition).

The second case of causes is that in which the action of a third party, alien to the victim and the Administration, assists in causing the damage. Normally, in these cases, the Administration is obliged to fully indemnify the injured party, especially when the third party can not be identified.

The third and last possibility is that in which several Public Administrations concur in the causation of the damage. When the damage has occurred in the context of a joint action between Administrations, the regime that may provide for the instrument regulating such joint action will be taken first and, in the absence thereof, the principle of solidarity will govern, so that the Administration against which the victim wishes to act will compensate. In the event that it is not a joint action, liability shall be fixed for each Administration independently, and where such determination is not possible, joint and several liability shall govern.

== Administrative review ==
The Public Administration has a series of mechanisms by which it tries to self-correct its own action. The administrative review is a method to rectify those acts that suffer from some vice of illegality, being also an indispensable prerequisite for the individual who wishes to access the contentious-administrative (In Spain, it is the jurisdictional level that deals with the conflicts of the Administration with the citizens), which this time, it is a reviewer of judicial nature.

Thus, there are three basic categories by which the Administration can perform the review of its own acts. First, the ex officio review, initiated (with exceptions) by the Administration itself in order to review its actions.

Next would be the administrative appeal, a system of contentious character whose initiation is made at the request of the interested parties, and which intends to review an administrative act. The administrative appeal is a prerequisite for access to contentious-administrative jurisdiction.

Finally, there is the previous complaint, a very similar system to the administrative appeal, which also has an initiation at the request of the interested party, but whose object is an underlying conflict between the individual and the Administration (not necessarily an administrative act).

=== Ex officio review ===
As previously stated, the ex officio review is a quasi-exclusive mechanism of Spanish Administrative Law that allows the Public Administration to review its acts motu proprio, without the need for an individual to urge such a review.

The ex officio review will proceed in four different assumptions. First, the existence of an act or regulation that can be considered null and void by law; Then, the review of an annulable declarative act of rights; Also the revocation of an act of taxation; And finally the correction of material and arithmetical errors.

=== Administrative appeal ===
The administrative appeal is that administrative act exercised preferably at the request of a party (the administrator) to obtain the modification, revocation or invalidation of an administrative resolution, generally when it causes a tort to the administered.

=== Economic-Administrative Courts ===
The Economic-Administrative Courts are a special courts unique from Spain that resolve the economic-administrative claims that has the objective of challenging the tax acts before the Administration itself.

== Contentious-administrative review ==
If, in the administrative review, the Administration verified the legality of its own acts, the contentious-administrative procedure results in a verification of the legality of the administrative act by independent courts belonging to the judicial branch.

"The Contentious-Administrative Jurisdiction is a key piece of our Rule of Law. Since it was established on our country by the Laws of April 2 and July 6, 1845, and through many vicissitudes, has given a good sample of its virtues since the Act of 27 December 1956, which endowed it with the characteristics that it has today and of the attributions essential to assume its mission to control the legality of administrative activity, guaranteeing the rights and legitimate interests of The citizens against the excess of the Administration."

— Explanatory Memorandum of the Law of Contentious Administrative Jurisdiction of 1998.

Not only administrative acts are challenging, but also the general provisions issued by the Administration, the absence of due administrative action and even ways of doing things. Contentious-administrative control is an important component of the rule of law, since it guarantees the supremacy of the legal norms on the regulatory norms and the action (or omission) of the Public Administration.

This principle, according to its importance, is enshrined in Article 106.1 of the Spanish Constitution, which states that the courts control the regulatory power and the legality of administrative action, as well as submitting it to the purposes that justify it.

=== Object ===
When referring to the subject of the contentious-administrative appeal, reference is made to that which can be challenged before the Contentious Administrative-Jurisdiction.

In the first place, any general provision issued by the Administration by virtue of its regulatory power is subject to contentious review. Likewise, it is possible to resort to the contentious-administrative appeal to review the mere material actions of the Administration. Finally, it can be claimed against the only passivity or administrative omission in situations that legally require its activity.

=== Subject ===
The rules on the standing to file a contentious-administrative appeal are set out in articles 19 and 20 of Law 29/1998, of July 13, regulating the Contentious-Administrative Jurisdiction.

According to article 19, they are entitled to appeal:

- The natural and legal persons that hold a right of legitimate interest.
- The groups of affected, unions without personality and independent or autonomous patrimonies that have a right or legitimate interest.
- Territorial administrations (general, autonomous and local).
- The instrumental administrations that have a legitimate right or interest.
- The Prosecution Ministry for cases legally envisaged.
- Any citizen, in those cases in which the Law allows the popular action.

It also contemplates those situations in which the affected are a plurality of people indeterminate or difficult to determine, in which case the standing to sue in defense of these diffuse interests will be exclusively the public bodies with jurisdiction in the matter, Unions and state-level associations whose primary purpose is equality between women and men.

The appeal of an administrative body against the Administration of which it forms part is not allowed. Nor will it be possible for a member of a collegiate body to appeal against its own administration. It will not be acceptable for an Entity governed by public law to challenge the decision of the Administration on which it depends or with which it is bound.

=== Contentious-administrative procedure ===
The contentious-administrative procedure is the result of a set of formal rules of a procedural nature that form the channel to be followed to settle the lawsuit, and to apply the substantive rules, which are the ones that ultimately must determine the merits of the matter.

==== Ordinary procedure ====
It is initiated by a brief reduced to citing the provision, act, inactivity or action constituting a de facto route that is contested and to request that the appeal be filed.

Once the procedure has been initiated, the court will require the Administration to forward the administrative file and to place the interested parties thereon by means of a notification that it will follow the rules established for the common administrative procedure. The administrative file will be placed in the hands of the appellant so that within 20 days, he files a writ of complaint, this time yes, with all the arguments and legal reasoning that he has deduced from the file. If there is no referral of the file, the Law raises multiple measures to compel the Administration, ranging from the impossibility of answering without accompanying file until the personal fine to the official or authority responsible for sending.

Once the claim has been filed by the appellant, it will be transferred to the defendants, who will also have a period of 20 days to respond. Both the demand and the answer must respect a structure with the proper separation of the facts, the grounds of Law and the claims that are deduced.

When there is disagreement about the facts and these have significance for the resolution of the lawsuit, the process will be tested. The evidence can be given at the request of a party or ex officio by the court. The general provisions issued in the field of evidence for civil proceedings are followed, although the deadline for proposing it will be fifteen days, and thirty days for it to be practiced.

At the end of the trial period, or not having occurred, the parties may request that a hearing be held, that conclusions be presented or that the suit be declared conclusive, without further formalities, for judgment.

Once the process of hearing or conclusions is concluded, and unless the court decides to practice additional evidence, the suit shall be declared final for judgment.

=== Appeals ===
==== Ordinary appeal ====
It is an appeal that is filed in order for a resolution to be revoked, by court or authority higher than the one that dictated it.

==== Cassation appeal ====
Appeal filed before the Supreme Court against final judgments, in which laws or legal doctrine are alleged to have been violated, or any essential procedural guarantee breached.

==== Reviewal appeal ====
It is the most extraordinary resource that knows the order of the contentious-administrative. It is filed when a judgment has already been issued and is requested to be reviewed by the appearance of new cases.

The law establishes 4 assumptions that allow to appeal this resource:

- If, after pronouncement of the judgment, decisive documents are recovered, not contributed by force majeure or by the party in whose favor it was given.
- If it had fallen on the basis of documents which, at the time of its being pronounced, were unaware of one of the parties having been recognized and declared to be false or whose falsity was recognized or later declared.
- If it has been issued by witness evidence, the witnesses have been convicted of false testimony given in the statements that served as the basis of the sentence.
- Information and communications technologyIf a judgment has been given by virtue of bribery, prevarication, violence or other fraudulent machinations.
