= Code scaling, applicability, and uncertainty =

Code scaling, applicability, and uncertainty (CSAU) methodology is a systematic approach proposed by the US Nuclear Regulatory Commission that can be used to identify and quantify overall nuclear reactor uncertainties, and this estimate methods for reactor safety analysis is in lieu of the earlier licensing practice that used deterministic methods with conservative assumptions to address uncertainties. Since the methodology was proposed about two decades ago, it has been widely used for new reactor designs and existing light water reactor power uprates.
