= Direct applicability =

Direct applicability refers to the fact that EU Regulations require no implementing legislation within individual member states - they take effect as soon as they are published by the European Commission.

== Legal basis ==
Direct applicability is a concept of European Union constitutional law that relates specifically to regulations, direct applicability (or the characteristic of regulations to be directly effective) is set out in Article 288 (ex Article 249) of the Treaty on the Functioning of the European Union (as amended by the Lisbon Treaty).

== Relation to direct effect ==
Direct applicability is often confused with the doctrine of direct effect. This confusion is perhaps explained by reference to the treaty provision governing regulations which provides that they, and only they, have direct applicability within the member states. The early jurisprudence of the ECJ suggested that 'direct effect' was a consequence of direct applicability as it was thought that the drafters of the original treaty intended regulations, and only regulations, to be directly effective. However, the expansion of the doctrine of direct effect to include directives and other measures served to create a distinction between direct applicability and direct effect. Direct applicability is now taken to mean that regulations require no domestic implementation - if direct effect was only ever intended to be a consequence of direct applicability then the relationship has been severed by a series of ECJ cases.
