= Eduardo Aunós =

Spanish politician (1894–1967)

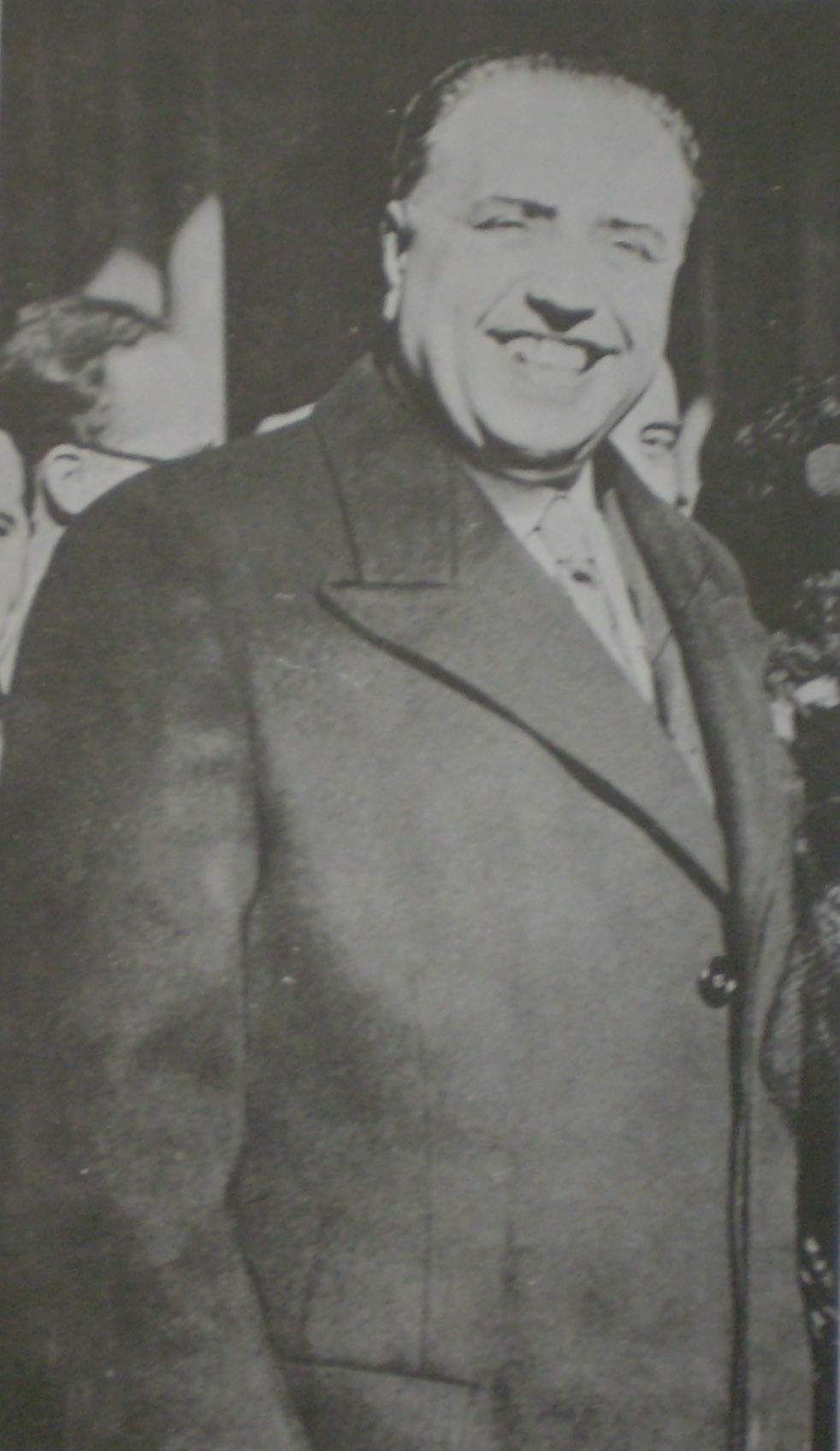

Minister of Justice of Spain
- In office 15 March 1943 – 20 July 1945
- Prime Minister: Francisco Franco
- Preceded by: Esteban Bilbao
- Succeeded by: Raimundo Fernández-Cuesta

Personal details
- Born: Eduardo Aunós Pérez; 8 September 1894 Lérida, Kingdom of Spain
- Died: 25 September 1967 (aged 73) Lausanne, Switzerland
- Party: FET y de las JONS (National Movement)

Eduardo Aunós Pérez (8 September 1894 – 25 September 1967) was a Spanish politician who served as Minister of Justice of Spain between 1943 and 1945, during the Francoist dictatorship.
