= Royal Legislative Decree (Spain) =

A Royal Legislative Decree is a legal rule having the force of a law in the Spanish legal system. The name of "Royal" is given because it has state rank and it is the King who is responsible for sanctioning and ordering the publication and compliance of the rule and the name of "Legislative" is given because it is a delegation from parliament. However, when the rule is created by an autonomous government, it receives the name of "Legislative Decree" because the King only sanctions the Decrees of the central government (the autonomous community Legislative Decree is sanctioned by the President of the Autonomous Community in the name of the King).

== Requirements to use the Royal Legislative Decree ==
In order to delegate the legislative capacity of Parliament to the Government, Parliament must make a law (known as Delegation Law or Law of Delegation) to allow it. In this way, the Legislative Decree that is created will already be backed by Congress and will become part of the legal system with full rights.

The law of delegation can take two forms:

- Bases Law. With this law, foundations are laid on which the government has to legislate to make an articulated text ex novo.
- Ordinary Law. With an ordinary law, the power to recast laws is delegated to the government, so laws that were separate could be united and create a single piece of legislation.

== Limits of the Royal Legislative Decree ==
According to the Spanish Constitution, there are 3 limits to the application of the Decree-Law:

- Material limits. The Legislative Decree can only legislate on matters that Congress has previously allowed (matters reserved to organic law cannot be delegated).
- Procedural Limits. To approve a Legislative Decree, the government has to follow the guidelines set by law.
- Limits of use. The delegation can be used only once.

== Judicial control ==
According to the Constitution, the Constitutional Court is the only body authorized to rule whether a rule with force of law is legal or not. This means that the Constitutional Court can judge not only the laws, but the rules with force of law as is the case of the Legislative Decree. If the Constitutional Court considers the subject matter is not within its competence, it may declare it totally or partially unconstitutional and expel it from the legal system.

For this reason, it is often considered that the Constitutional Courts are negative legislators, lacking the power to make laws but with the power to repeal all or portions of the unconstitutional laws/acts.

== See also ==
- Decree
- Royal Decree-Law
- Royal Decree (Spain)
