= Royal Decree-Law (Spain) =

Legal rule with the force of law

A Royal Decree-Law is a legal rule having the force of a law in the Spanish legal system. The name of "Royal" is given because it has state rank and it is the King who is responsible for sanctioning and ordering the publication and compliance of the rule. However, when the rule is created by an autonomous government, it receives the name of "Decree-Law" because the King only sanctions the Decrees of the central government (the autonomous community Decree-Law is sanctioned by the President of the Autonomous Community in the name of the King).

== Requirements to use the Decree-Law ==
The Constitution says literally:

In case of extraordinary and urgent need, the Government may issue temporary legislative provisions which shall take the form of decree-laws ...

— Article 86.1 Spanish Constitution of 1978

This means that there are two fundamental conditions to use the form of the Royal Decree-Law: that the measures must be implemented urgently (and cannot be carried out by the normal parliamentary process because it is very slow), and that the Decree-Law is created because of situation of extraordinary necessity.

== Limits of the Decree-Law ==
According to the Spanish Constitution, there are 3 limits to the application of the Decree-Law:

- Circumstantial limits: About the fact that causes the birth of the decree-law (see Requirements).
- Material limits: The Decree-Law can not legislate on certain matters.
- Temporal limits: The Decree-Law is temporary and must be ratified, rejected or converted into law by the Cortes Generales.

=== Circumstantial limits ===
The first of the limits lies in the non-compliance with the initial requirements. If the Decree-Law is not created because of an urgent and extraordinary need, it can be eliminated.

=== Material limits ===
The Constitution enumerates a series of subjects on which the Decree-Law does not have the capacity to legislate. These are:

- The Decree-Law may not affect the legal system of the basic State institutions.
- The Decree-Law may not affect the rights, duties and freedoms of the citizens contained in Part I of the Constitution.
- The Decree-Law may not affect the system of Self-governing of the Autonomous Communities.
- The Decree-Law may not affect the General Electoral Law.

=== Time limits ===
The Decree-Law is temporary and, according to the Constitution:

Decree-Laws must be immediately submitted for debate and voting by the entire Congress, which must be summoned for this purpose if not already in session, within thirty days of their promulgation.

— Article 86.2. Spanish Constitution of 1978

This means that within 30 days, the Congress must debate whether or not the Decree-Law is valid and has three possibilities:

1. The Congress can ratify the Decree-Law and it becomes part of the legal system (the Decree-Law is part of the legal system since its creation, but needs the ratification of the Congress to remain so).
2. The Congress can repeal the Decree-Law and it is removed from the legal system.
3. The Congress may process them as Government bills by means of the urgency procedure. (This allows the Decree-Law to elevate to the status of Law.)

The Royal Decree-Law may occupy the "place" or regulate matters that would be dealt with by ordinary law, but never of those matters reserved for the organic law (fundamental rights, autonomy statutes, electoral regime, etc.).

With these limits the Constitution tries to prevent abuse of the Decree-Law, but since it is the government who decides when it is a moment of urgent and extraordinary need, many times the Decree-Law does not literally respect the initial requirements.

== Judicial control ==
According to the Constitution, the Constitutional Court is the only body authorized to rule whether a rule with force of law is legal or not. This means that the Constitutional Court can judge not only the laws, but the rules with force of law as is the case of the Decree-Law. If the Constitutional Court considers that the situation is not one of urgent and extraordinary need or that if the subject matter is not within its competence, it may declare it totally or partially unconstitutional and expel it from the legal system.

For this reason, it is often considered that the Constitutional Courts are negative legislators, lacking the power to make laws but with the power to repeal all or portions of the unconstitutional laws/acts.

== See also ==
- Decree
- Royal Legislative Decree
- Royal Decree (Spain)
- Most of the information is taken from the Spanish Constitution of 1978.
- Decree law
