= Autonomous Communities Administration =

The Administration of the Autonomous Communities, also known as Autonomous Administration, is a Public Administration of Spain. It belongs to the second level of the Public Administrations, because it exerts its powers within the limits of each Autonomous Community.

It is integrated by:

- Central Organization (Government of the Autonomous Community or Council of Government, the President of the Autonomous Communities, the Vice President and the Councilors).
- Peripheral Administration (Territorial Delegations of the Autonomous Communities, Sectoral Delegations of the Government Departments).

The Autonomic Administration has a very broad level of competence, based on the decentralization of the State or through the State of Autonomies. As for the level of competences, they are not always the same, and are regulated in each Statute of Autonomy for each Autonomous Community, making in some cases the level of competences is higher than those of a Federal state.

It should also be taken into account that the Autonomous Community has its own legislative body, and that the autonomous administration must behave before it like any other executive power, respecting the rules issued by its autonomous parliament.

In the Spanish Constitution of 1978 it is regulated in Chapter Three, entitled "of the Autonomous Communities". This Chapter regulates the form of creation and authorization of the Autonomous Communities, the elaboration of its Statutes, the powers transferred to the Autonomous Communities, the powers of the State, its resources and its financing.

== Structure ==
Like the General State Administration, the Autonomous Administration is regulated by Law 40/2015 and the structure is practically the same. However, it can vary from one Autonomous Community to another depending on the provisions in the Statute of Autonomy. Here the common organs are exposed:

=== Central Organization ===
==== Government ====
The Autonomous Government is the executive power of the Autonomous Community. As in the Central Government it responds before its parliament (autonomic parliament). The Government directs the Autonomous Administration within its competences.

Contrary to what happens with the Central Government, the decisions taken by the Executive are not sanctioned by the King, and it is the President of the Autonomous Community who signs the laws and decisions on his behalf.

==== President ====
The President of the Autonomous Community is the head of the executive power as well as the highest authority of the Autonomous Community. He directs the Autonomous Government, elects its vice president and Councilors and decides the policies that the government carries out.

As at the State level, the President may elect more than one Vice President and may freely separate his Vice Presidents and Councilors. If the President is ceased, they cease with him.

==== Councilors ====
The Councilors of the Autonomous Community are like the Ministers of the Central Government. They lead a Consejería (government department as a Ministry). Councilor work in their governmental area and appoint the members of their department like Vice Councilors, Directors-General, etc.

The figure of the Vice Councilor or Deputy Councilor is not always present, because it is the decision of the Councilor to exist or not this position and, in Autonomous Communities of small size where the work is not much, often these positions do not exist.

==== Directors-General ====
The Directorates-General are management departmental bodies and steering bodies, hierarchically inferior to the Councilors or Vice Councilors (if they exist). The holder must have a degree of competence and professional experience, and will be selected from career officials of the State, Autonomous Communities or Local entities, also demanding the title of Doctor, Licensee, Engineer, Architect or equivalent. The Royal Decree on the structure of the department may omit the first requirement because it is a Directorate-General whose exceptional characteristics require that the holder does not have the status of official of the State.

==== Cabinets ====
They are consultation bodies generally composed of a technical secretary and several technicians who support the President, Vice President, Councilors, etc. in their relations with institutions, in making decisions and performing special advisory tasks in a particular branch of knowledge.

=== Peripheral Administration ===
==== Territorial Delegations ====
The Territorial Delegations of the Autonomous Communities carry out the same activity as the Delegations of the Central Government. They are administrative bodies whose head is a high position appointed in the discretion of the Autonomous Government. He is in charge of the management of the Autonomous Administration in some of the territorial divisions of the Autonomous Communities, such as the Province.

==== Sectoral Delegations ====
The Sectoral Delegations of the Consejerías are organs that represent the different Departments of an autonomous government. The holder must have a degree of competence and professional experience, and will be selected from career officials of the State, Autonomous Communities or Local entities, also demanding the title of Doctor, Licensee, Engineer, Architect or equivalent

== See also ==
- Public Administration of Spain
- General State Administration
- Government of Spain
- Singular population entities
