= General State Administration =

Public Administration of Spain

Logo of the General State Administration

The General State Administration (Spanish: Administración General del Estado) is one of the Public Administrations of Spain. It is the only administration with powers throughout the national territory and it is controlled by the central government.

It comprises a:

- Central Organization (Government, Council of Ministers, Government Delegated Committees, Ministries, General Commission of Secretaries of State and Undersecretaries and Interministerial Committees).
- Peripheral Organization (Delegations of the Government in the Autonomous Communities, the Sub-delegations of the Government in the Provinces and the Insular Directorates of the General State Administration).
- (The) State Administration Abroad (Embassies and consulates)

Its legal regime is set out in article 103 of the Spanish Constitution of 1978 and its specific organisation and powers by Law 40/2015. This establishes that it, under the direction of the Government and with full submission to the law, objectively serves the general interest, developing executive functions of an administrative nature.

On October 1, 2016, the forerunner Law 6/1997 was replaced by the 2015 law stated.

== Structure ==
=== Central Organization ===
==== Ministers ====
The Ministers are the holders of a Ministry, being the hierarchically superior head of the branch in question. They perform the function of axis between their respective ministerial department and the own organ of Government, of which they are part. In this way, they are the head of a certain sector of the administrative apparatus, and at the same time, they are the base element of an organ of political character, as it is the own Government.

They are named and separated by the King of Spain on the proposal of the President of the Government of Spain. In the event that the President himself ceases, his ministers will leave the post together with him, something completely logical given that the bond of trust between the legislative branch and the executive branch occurs through the figure of the President of the Government, in this way, it is logical that if such a link is broken, all the components of the executive fall with him. Along the same lines, the President will be in charge of determining the number and competencies of the Ministries.

Regarding the functions of the Minister, they can be divided between those that he serves as a member of the Government, and those he performs as a Minister. Regarding this second aspect, there is an immense variety of functions that the Minister plays in his role of head and director of the corresponding Ministerial Department. The Law about Organization and Functioning of the General State Administration makes an exhaustive enumeration of functions, among which the ones related to the appointment and separation of the governing bodies of the Ministry, the determination of their internal organizational structure, human resources management, issues Economic and budgetary aspects of its Department, and to end representative functions, in a political (relations with the Autonomous Communities, etc.) and legal (acting on behalf of the legal entity of the State and imputation of its acts) sense.

Finally, it should be pointed out the office of non-suitcase minister, an infrequent position and intimately linked to the person appointed for it, who does not hold the title of any Ministry, but whose presence in the Council of Ministers is necessary, either because he is a figure of trust for the President, or because it is a government fruit of an alliance between different parties, and for that reason, has to go to this position as a way for the minority party to accede to the Government.

==== Secretaries of State ====
The Secretariats of State are departmental superior bodies of management and sectorial management that occupy the superior level in the hierarchy of intermediate commands between the Minister and the official apparatus, above the General Director and of the General Secretary. When it is a position of strict political trust, his appointment is free, as is his removal. Contrary to what happens with the Ministers, the Secretaries of State do not fall with the President if he ceases. The Secretary of State is what is known in the Anglo-Saxon world as Deputy Minister or Deputy Secretary (United States).

Law 6/1997, about Organization and Functioning of the General State Administration states in article 9.1 the eventual character of the body, calling it a "higher body", as it does with the Ministers. Such status implies a different treatment in terms of the personal requirements to be fulfilled by the holder, which in this case supposes a total absence of restrictions, giving total freedom to the Government and the Minister to choose the person they consider convenient.

They are in charge of appointing and separating the Directors-General, as well as directing and coordinating the Directorates-General under the Secretariat of State concerned. Likewise, the Secretary of State shall assume those functions that the Minister delegates thereto, as indicated in Article 7.2 of the Government Law.

==== Undersecretaries ====
Law 6/1997 qualifies it as a governing body, whose holder must be a career official of the State, Autonomous Communities or Local Entities, in addition to having the status of Doctor, Licensee, Engineer, Architect or equivalent. This is a high position of political trust, appointed by the Government on the proposal of the Minister concerned, and whose dismissal is equally free.

Since the creation of the office in 1834, its functions have evolved from the original supervision of the instruction of the administrative records to the contemporary headquarters of the general and instrumental services of the Department. Their current functions are:

- Control of the effectiveness of the Ministry and its public bodies.
- Determination of the precise actions for the improvement of the systems of planning, direction and organization and for the rationalization and simplification of the procedures and working methods.
- Direction of operation of common services.
- Establishment of the corresponding inspection programs for the services of the Ministry.
- Planning the activity of your Ministry.
- Proposition of the organizational measures of the Ministry.

==== Directors-General ====
The Directorates-General are management departmental bodies and steering bodies, hierarchically inferior to Secretaries of State and Secretaries General. The holder must have a degree of competence and professional experience, and will be selected from career officials of the State, Autonomous Communities or Local entities, also demanding the title of Doctor, Licensee, Engineer, Architect or equivalent. The Royal Decree on the structure of the Department may omit the first requirement because it is a Directorate-General whose exceptional characteristics require that the holder does not have the status of official of the State.

With respect to their functions, as indicated in Article 18 of Law 6/1997, the General Director will be in touch with the bureaucratic apparatus of the State, acting as a manager of a determined area. It will be the one who proposes the projects referred to its corresponding sector, and also, will be in charge of directing and supervising their execution, all with a view to achieving the objectives that have been established by the Minister. Likewise, it will exercise the specific powers delegated to it, or those that will be awarded to it under the pertinent rules.

On the other hand, the Director General, as a consequence of his position of supremacy within the Directorate-General, will be in charge of monitoring the proper functioning of the entire bureaucratic complex that depends on him. Likewise, it will be in charge of issuing the corresponding information to the General Direction, for its departmental superiors.

==== Technical General Secretaries ====
They are the technical bodies of the Ministry, with the rank of General Director. They are under the immediate dependence of the Undersecretary. Their functions are:

- They act as a communication bodies of the Ministry.
- They coordinate and organize the internal system of services.
- They work in the department's Head of Personnel.
- They elaborate the general plans of action and the programs of needs.
- Provide technical and administrative assistance to the Minister.

==== Cabinets ====
They are consultation bodies generally composed of a technical secretary and several technicians who support the president, vice president, ministers, Secretaries of State, etc. in their relations with institutions, in making decisions and performing special advisory tasks in a particular branch of knowledge.

=== Peripheral Organization ===
The Peripheral State Administration is an Administration dependent on the General State Administration that, through bodies dependent on it, assure the presence of the General State Administration throughout the national territory. It acts, therefore, as an extension of government and administration.

The structure of the Peripheral Administration varies according to the Autonomous Communities, because in the majority of them there are Delegations and Sub-delegations with the exception of the single-province Autonomous Communities, that do not have Sub-delegations, since the competences of these are taken by the Delegations itself (the Autonomous Community of Madrid is a single-province autonomous community that due to its status of Capital of the Kingdom and his population size, has Delegations and Sub-delegations). In the islands, there exists the Island Director.

==== Delegations of the Government ====
The Delegations of the Government in the Autonomous communities are administrative bodies whose head is a high position appointed in the discretion of the Government, responding before the Ministry of Public Administration. Has Undersecretary rank. He is in charge of the management of the State Administration in the territory of a certain Autonomous Community. In addition, it assumes the former sanctioning powers of the Civil Governor, directs integrated territorial services and appoints the Sub-delegate of the Government, which is the figure that properly replaces that of civilian governors.

==== Sub-delegations of the Government ====
The Sub-delegations of the Government in the Provinces are bodies of the Delegations of the Government that carry out the functions that the Delegate assigned them and represents the Government in the Provinces. In the single-province Autonomous Communities, its powers are assumed by the Government Delegate.

The holder must have a degree of competence and professional experience, and will be selected from career officials of the State, Autonomous Communities or Local entities, also demanding the title of Doctor, Licensee, Engineer, Architect or equivalent

==== Insular Directors ====
In the islands of Menorca, Ibiza, Formentera, Lanzarote, Fuerteventura, La Palma, El Hierro and La Gomera, there will be an Insular Director of the General State Administration. It will depend hierarchically on the Delegate of the Government or the Sub-delegate, when this position exists.

The holder must have a degree of competence and professional experience, and will be selected from career officials of the State, Autonomous Communities or Local entities, also demanding the title of Doctor, Licensee, Engineer, Architect or equivalent.

=== State Administration Abroad ===
It is integrated by:

==== Delegations ====
The delegations represent the Kingdom of Spain in a body of an international organization, in a Conference of States convened by or under the auspices of an international organization, or in a concrete act organized by a third State for which a delegation is required to form a delegation official.

==== Institutions and public bodies ====
In this section, public bodies, state companies, public foundations and consortium entities and any other related entities or dependents of the Public Administrations that act abroad.

==== Special Diplomatic Missions ====
The Special Diplomatic Missions temporarily represent the Kingdom of Spain to one or more States, with their consent, for a specific purpose, or to one or more States where there is no permanent Diplomatic Mission or to all States for a special purpose .

==== Consular Offices ====
The Consular Offices are the bodies of the General State Administration in charge of the exercise of consular functions and especially of providing assistance and protection to Spaniards abroad. The Consular Offices shall exercise the functions attributed to them by the current regulations, International Law and international treaties to which Spain is a party.

==== Representations or Permanent Missions ====
The Permanent Diplomatic Missions represent the Kingdom of Spain before one or more States with which it has established diplomatic relations. When a Mission represents Spain before several States it will do it in multiple accreditation system and with residence in one of them.

The Permanent Representations represent the Kingdom of Spain before the European Union or an International Organization. They shall be Observatory Representations when Spain is not part of the organization to which they are accredited.

== See also ==
- Public Administration of Spain
- Autonomous Communities Administration
- Government of Spain
