= List of labour ministers of Spain =

This is a list of the Spanish ministers of labour since 1920, when the government department was established. Throughout history, this position has also had jurisdiction over social security, social protection, migrations and, occasionally, over industry, trade, justice and health care.

Before 1920, labour responsibilities were divided between the Minister of the Interior and the Minister of Development.

Name	Term		Duration	Party	Government		Ref.
Carlos Cañal y Migolla (1876–1938)	8 May 1920	13 March 1921	309 days	Conservative	Eduardo Dato	Alfonso XIII (1886–1931)	
Carlos Cañal y Migolla (1876–1938)	8 May 1920	13 March 1921	309 days	Conservative	The Count of Bugallal (Note: He acted as acting prime minister after the assassination of Eduardo Dato from March 8 to March 13, 1921)	Alfonso XIII (1886–1931)	
The Count of Lizárraga (1855–1939)	13 March 1921	14 August 1921	154 days	Conservative	Manuel Allendesalazar	Alfonso XIII (1886–1931)	
Leopoldo Matos y Massieu (1878–1936)	14 August 1921	8 March 1922	206 days	Liberal	Antonio Maura	Alfonso XIII (1886–1931)	
Abilio Calderón Rojo (Note: José Jorro Miranda, Count of Altea, Under-Secretary of Labour, served as acting minister from August 12 to September 18, 1922.) (1867–1939)	8 March 1922	7 December 1922	274 days	Conservative	José Sánchez-Guerra y Martínez	Alfonso XIII (1886–1931)	
Joaquín Chapaprieta (1871–1951)	7 December 1922	3 September 1923	270 days	Liberal	The Marquess of Alhucemas	Alfonso XIII (1886–1931)	
Luis Armiñán Pérez (1871–1949)	3 September 1923	15 September 1923	12 days	Liberal Left	The Marquess of Alhucemas	Alfonso XIII (1886–1931)	
Alejandro García Martín (Note: High-ranking official of the Department of Labour, Trade and Industry in charge of the ministerial department.) acting minister	17 September 1923	21 December 1923	95 days	Independent	The Marquess of Estella	Alfonso XIII (1886–1931)	
Juan Flórez Posada (Note: Under-Secretary in charge of the ministerial department.) (1877–1933) acting minister	21 December 1923	7 February 1924	48 days	Independent	The Marquess of Estella	Alfonso XIII (1886–1931)	
Eduardo Aunós (Note: José Marvá y Mayer, Inspector-General of Labour, Director-General for Labour and Social Action, served as acting minister from May 21 to June 22, 1925.) (1894–1967)	7 February 1924	30 January 1930	5 years, 357 days	Patriotic Union	The Marquess of Estella	Alfonso XIII (1886–1931)	
The Marquess of Guad-el-Jelú (Note: During his absences: Felipe Gómez Cano, Under-Secretary (8 April – 15 April 1930; 26 June – 1 July 1930; 31 January – 6 February 1931) and Luis Rodríguez de Viguri, Minister of National Economy (3 – 9 January 1931).) (1878–1959)	30 January 1930	18 February 1931	1 year, 19 days	Independent	The Count of Xauen	Alfonso XIII (1886–1931)	
The Duke of Maura (1879–1963)	18 February 1931	14 April 1931	55 days	Conservative	Juan Bautista Aznar-Cabañas	Alfonso XIII (1886–1931)	
Francisco Largo Caballero (1869–1946)	14 April 1931	12 September 1933	2 years, 151 days	Socialist	Niceto Alcalá-Zamora	Niceto Alcalá-Zamora (1931–1936)	
Francisco Largo Caballero (1869–1946)	14 April 1931	12 September 1933	2 years, 151 days	Socialist	Manuel Azaña	Niceto Alcalá-Zamora (1931–1936)	
Ricardo Samper (1881–1938)	12 September 1933	8 October 1933	26 days	Radical Republican	Alejandro Lerroux	Niceto Alcalá-Zamora (1931–1936)	
Carlos Pi y Suñer (1881–1938)	8 October 1933	16 December 1933	69 days	Catalan Republican Left	Diego Martínez Barrio	Niceto Alcalá-Zamora (1931–1936)	
José Estadella Arnó (1880–1951)	16 December 1933	4 October 1934	292 days	Radical Republican	Alejandro Lerroux	Niceto Alcalá-Zamora (1931–1936)	
José Estadella Arnó (1880–1951)	16 December 1933	4 October 1934	292 days	Radical Republican	Ricardo Samper	Niceto Alcalá-Zamora (1931–1936)	
José Oriol Anguera de Sojo (1879–1956)	4 October 1934	3 April 1935	181 days	CEDA	Alejandro Lerroux	Niceto Alcalá-Zamora (1931–1936)	
Eloy Vaquero Cantillo (1888–1960)	3 April 1935	6 May 1935	33 days	Radical Republican	Alejandro Lerroux	Niceto Alcalá-Zamora (1931–1936)	
Federico Salmón Amorín (1900–1936)	6 May 1935	14 December 1935	222 days	CEDA	Alejandro Lerroux	Niceto Alcalá-Zamora (1931–1936)	
Federico Salmón Amorín (1900–1936)	6 May 1935	14 December 1935	222 days	CEDA	Joaquín Chapaprieta	Niceto Alcalá-Zamora (1931–1936)	
Alfredo Martínez García-Argüelles (1877–1936)	14 December 1935	30 December 1935	16 days	Liberal Democrat	Manuel Portela Valladares	Niceto Alcalá-Zamora (1931–1936)	
Manuel Becerra Fernández (1867–1940)	30 December 1935	19 February 1936	51 days	Radical Republican	Manuel Portela Valladares	Niceto Alcalá-Zamora (1931–1936)	
Enrique Ramos Ramos (1873–1957)	19 February 1936	13 May 1936	84 days	Republican Left	Manuel Azaña	Niceto Alcalá-Zamora (1931–1936)	
Enrique Ramos Ramos (1873–1957)	19 February 1936	13 May 1936	84 days	Republican Left	Augusto Barcia Trelles (Note: Acting prime minister from 10 to 13 May 1936)	Manuel Azaña (1936–1939)	
Joan Lluhí (1897–1944)	13 May 1936	19 July 1936	67 days	Catalan Republican Left	Santiago Casares Quiroga	Manuel Azaña (1936–1939)	
Bernardo Giner de los Ríos (1888–1970)	19 July 1936	19 July 1936	0 days	Republican Left	Diego Martínez Barrio	Manuel Azaña (1936–1939)	
Start of the Spanish Civil War						Manuel Azaña (1936–1939)	
Republican side						Manuel Azaña (1936–1939)	
Joan Lluhí (1897–1944)	19 July 1936	4 September 1936	47 days	Catalan Republican Left	José Giral	Manuel Azaña (1936–1939)	
Josep Tomàs i Piera (1900–1976)	4 September 1936	4 November 1936	61 days	Catalan Republican Left	Francisco Largo Caballero	Manuel Azaña (1936–1939)	
Anastasio de Gracia (1890–1981)	4 November 1936	17 May 1937	194 days	Socialist	Francisco Largo Caballero	Manuel Azaña (1936–1939)	
Jaume Aiguader (1882–1943)	17 May 1937	16 August 1938	1 year, 91 days	Catalan Republican Left	Juan Negrín	Manuel Azaña (1936–1939)	
José Moix Regàs (1898–1973)	16 August 1938	5 March 1939	201 days	PSUC	Juan Negrín	Manuel Azaña (1936–1939)	
Antonio Pérez García (1890–1955)	5 March 1939	31 March 1939	26 days	Independent (UGT)	National Defence Council	José Miaja (1939)	
Rebel side
Alejandro Gallo Artacho (Note: Serving under the title of "President of the Culture and Education Commission".) (1887–1966)	4 October 1936	31 January 1938	1 year, 119 days	Independent	Junta Técnica del Estado	Francisco Franco (1939–1975)	
Pedro González Bueno (1896–1985)	31 January 1938	1 April 1939	1 year, 60 days	National Movement	Franco I	Francisco Franco (1939–1975)	
End of the Spanish Civil War						Francisco Franco (1939–1975)	
Pedro González Bueno (1896–1985)	1 April 1939	9 August 1939	130 days	National Movement	Franco I	Francisco Franco (1939–1975)	
The Count of Benjumea (1878–1963)	9 August 1939	19 May 1941	1 year, 283 days	National Movement	Franco II	Francisco Franco (1939–1975)	
José Antonio Girón (1911–1995)	19 May 1941	25 February 1957	15 years, 282 days	National Movement	Franco II	Francisco Franco (1939–1975)	
José Antonio Girón (1911–1995)	19 May 1941	25 February 1957	15 years, 282 days	National Movement	Franco III	Francisco Franco (1939–1975)	
José Antonio Girón (1911–1995)	19 May 1941	25 February 1957	15 years, 282 days	National Movement	Franco IV	Francisco Franco (1939–1975)	
Fermín Sanz-Orrio (1901–1998)	25 February 1957	10 July 1962	5 years, 135 days	National Movement	Franco V	Francisco Franco (1939–1975)	
Jesús Romeo Gorría (1916–2001)	10 July 1962	29 October 1969	7 years, 111 days	National Movement	Franco VI	Francisco Franco (1939–1975)	
Jesús Romeo Gorría (1916–2001)	10 July 1962	29 October 1969	7 years, 111 days	National Movement	Franco VII	Francisco Franco (1939–1975)	
Licinio de la Fuente (1923–2015)	29 October 1969	4 March 1975	5 years, 126 days	National Movement	Franco VIII	Francisco Franco (1939–1975)	
Licinio de la Fuente (1923–2015)	29 October 1969	4 March 1975	5 years, 126 days	National Movement	Luis Carrero Blanco	Francisco Franco (1939–1975)	
Licinio de la Fuente (1923–2015)	29 October 1969	4 March 1975	5 years, 126 days	National Movement	The Duke of Fernández-Miranda (acting)	Francisco Franco (1939–1975)	
Licinio de la Fuente (1923–2015)	29 October 1969	4 March 1975	5 years, 126 days	National Movement	The Marquess of Arias Navarro	Francisco Franco (1939–1975)	
Fernando Suárez González (1933–2024)	4 March 1975	11 December 1975	282 days	National Movement	The Marquess of Arias Navarro	Francisco Franco (1939–1975)	
Fernando Suárez González (1933–2024)	4 March 1975	11 December 1975	282 days	National Movement	The Marquess of Arias Navarro	Juan Carlos I (1975–2014)	
José Solís Ruiz (1913–1990)	11 December 1975	7 July 1976	209 days	National Movement	The Marquess of Arias Navarro	Juan Carlos I (1975–2014)	
Álvaro Rengifo (1932–2020)	7 July 1976	4 July 1977	362 days	Independent	The Duke of Suárez	Juan Carlos I (1975–2014)	
Manuel Jiménez de Parga (1929–2014)	4 July 1977	24 February 1978	235 days	Centrist	The Duke of Suárez	Juan Carlos I (1975–2014)	
Rafael Calvo Ortega (1933–2025)	24 February 1978	2 May 1980	2 years, 68 days	Centrist	The Duke of Suárez	Juan Carlos I (1975–2014)	
Salvador Sánchez-Terán (1934–2022)	2 May 1980	8 September 1980	129 days	Centrist	The Duke of Suárez	Juan Carlos I (1975–2014)	
Félix Manuel Pérez Miyares (1936–2024)	8 September 1980	26 February 1981	171 days	Centrist	The Duke of Suárez	Juan Carlos I (1975–2014)	
Jesús Sancho Rof (born 1940)	26 February 1981	1 December 1981	278 days	Centrist	The Marquess of Ría de Ribadeo	Juan Carlos I (1975–2014)	
Santiago Rodríguez-Miranda (born 1940)	1 December 1981	2 December 1982	1 year, 1 day	Centrist	The Marquess of Ría de Ribadeo	Juan Carlos I (1975–2014)	
Joaquín Almunia (born 1948)	2 December 1982	25 July 1986	3 years, 235 days	Socialist	Felipe González	Juan Carlos I (1975–2014)	
Manuel Chaves (born 1945)	25 July 1986	27 April 1990	3 years, 276 days	Socialist	Felipe González	Juan Carlos I (1975–2014)	
Luis Martínez Noval (1948–2013)	27 April 1990	13 July 1993	3 years, 77 days	Socialist	Felipe González	Juan Carlos I (1975–2014)	
José Antonio Griñán (born 1946)	13 July 1993	5 May 1996	2 years, 297 days	Socialist	Felipe González	Juan Carlos I (1975–2014)	
Javier Arenas (born 1957)	5 May 1996	18 January 1999	2 years, 258 days	Popular	José María Aznar	Juan Carlos I (1975–2014)	
Manuel Pimentel (born 1961)	18 January 1999	20 February 2000	1 year, 33 days	Popular	José María Aznar	Juan Carlos I (1975–2014)	
Juan Carlos Aparicio (born 1955)	20 February 2000	9 July 2002	2 years, 139 days	Popular	José María Aznar	Juan Carlos I (1975–2014)	
Eduardo Zaplana (born 1956)	9 July 2002	17 April 2004	1 year, 283 days	Popular	José María Aznar	Juan Carlos I (1975–2014)	
Jesús Caldera (born 1957)	18 April 2004	14 April 2008	3 years, 362 days	Socialist	José Luis Rodríguez Zapatero	Juan Carlos I (1975–2014)	
Celestino Corbacho (born 1949)	14 April 2008	20 October 2010	2 years, 359 days	Socialist	José Luis Rodríguez Zapatero	Juan Carlos I (1975–2014)	
Valeriano Gómez (born 1957)	20 October 2010	22 December 2011	2 years, 258 days	Socialist	José Luis Rodríguez Zapatero	Juan Carlos I (1975–2014)	
Fátima Báñez (1967–2026)	22 December 2011	7 June 2018	6 years, 167 days	Popular	Mariano Rajoy	Juan Carlos I (1975–2014)	
Fátima Báñez (1967–2026)	22 December 2011	7 June 2018	6 years, 167 days	Popular	Mariano Rajoy	Felipe VI (2014-present)	
Magdalena Valerio (born 1959)	7 June 2018	13 January 2020	1 year, 220 days	Socialist	Pedro Sánchez	Felipe VI (2014-present)	
Yolanda Díaz (born 1971)	13 January 2020	Incumbent	6 years, 304 days	Communist	Pedro Sánchez	Felipe VI (2014-present)	
Yolanda Díaz (born 1971)	13 January 2020	Incumbent	6 years, 304 days	Sumar	Pedro Sánchez	Felipe VI (2014-present)	
