= Arriaga (surname) =

- Place of origin: Spain

Arriaga is a Basque surname that may refer to:

- Agustín Arriaga Rivera (1925–2006), Mexican politician
- Emmanuel Arriaga (born 1991), Mexican footballer
- Eudalio Arriaga (born 1975), Colombian footballer
- Genaro Ruiz Arriaga (born 1955), Mexican politician
- Guillermo Arriaga (born 1958), Mexican author, screenwriter, and producer
- Guillermo Arriaga Fernández (1926–2014), Mexican dancer, choreographer, and composer
- Ignacio J. Pérez Arriaga (born 1948), Spanish engineer
- Jesus Arriaga (1858–1885), 19th century Mexican bandit
- Fr. Joaquín Sáenz y Arriaga, S.J. (1899–1976), Mexican theologian, sedevacantist
- Joseba Arriaga (born 1982), Spanish footballer
- Juan Crisóstomo Arriaga (1806–1826), Basque-Spanish composer
- Justino Arriaga Rojas (born 1979), Mexican politician
- Kaúlza de Arriaga (1915–2004), commander of Portuguese troops in the Mozambican War of Independence
- Kervin Arriaga (born 1998), Honduran footballer
- Lucrécia de Arriaga (1844–1927), First Lady of Portugal
- Luis Arriaga (born 2001), American soccer/football player
- Manuel de Arriaga (1840–1917), president of Portugal
- Marcia Arriaga (born 1955), Mexican swimmer
- Mercedes Arriaga Flórez (born 1960), Spanish philologist and writer
- Pablo José Arriaga (1564–1622), Spanish Jesuit missionary
- Ponciano Arriaga (1811–1865), Mexican politician
- Rodrigo de Arriaga (1592–1667), Spanish Jesuit philosopher and theologian
- Sebastião de Arriaga (1774–1826), Portuguese military commander
- Shirley Arriaga, American politician
- Sonia Arriaga, Mexican bioengineer
- Tereza de Arriaga (1915–2013), Portuguese painter

== See also ==
- Arriaga (disambiguation)
