= Chucho el Roto (disambiguation) =

Chucho el Roto (real name: Jesús Arriaga, 1858–1885) was a Mexican bandit.

Chucho el Roto may also refer to:

- Chucho el roto (TV series), a 1968 Mexican telenovela
- Chucho el Roto (film), a 1960 Mexican historical adventure film
- Chucho el Roto (1934 film), Mexican film directed by Gabriel Soria
