= IIT Madrid =

The IIT (Institute for Research in Technology in English; Instituto de Investigación Tecnológica in Spanish) belongs to the School of Engineering (ICAI) of Comillas Pontifical University in Madrid, Spain. It is a non-profit Institute created in 1984 with the aim of promoting research and developing postgraduate programs in diverse technological fields through participation in projects funded by the industry and administrations.

The applied research at IIT is project oriented and results in doctoral dissertations and scientific publications, technical reports, and software products and applications. It also provides specialized training in Master and PhD programs and in-house courses.

IIT is completely self-financed through externally funded research activities, creating a strong nexus to the Industry and Administrations; it responds thus to a clear social demand. About 70% of all research projects carried out are privately financed by the Industry. IIT has proven that a project-based research is sustainable and that this applied research allows self-financing the IIT. Several models and tools of the IIT such as the Reference Network Model (RNM) or its off-spring the Rural Electrification Model (REM), SPLODER, an in-house developed AGC controller, iSLA, etc. are widely used throughout the Industry and Administrations.

IIT has a strong presence in international organizations and associations. IIT research staff is currently leading the Electric Energy Systems – University Enterprise Training Partnership (EES-UETP) network or the International Smart Grid Action Network (ISGAN) academy. IIT is also actively involved in working groups of Conseil International des Grands Réseaux Électriques (CIGRE) and Congrès International des Réseaux Electriques de Distribution (CIRED).

== History ==
IIT was created on March 6, 1984. As indicated in the minutes of the meeting of the Governing Board, the core initial investigators formed the group dedicated to the area of energy in the late Technological Institute for Postgraduates (ITP). The ITP project emerged in 1974 to bring to Spain the academic-business collaboration structure from the American postgraduate. The ITP was funded by Spanish companies and driven by Antonio Barrera de Irimo, Minister of Finance, President of Telefónica and the Board of trustees at ICAI. He sent to the Massachusetts Institute of Technology (MIT) in Boston about 40 graduates in engineering and applied sciences to study and research in that institution and bring to Spain its innovative spirit and quality of research, to make them serve a thriving industry Postgraduates Institute of Technology. The group completed their training, but did not finish their final purpose, as Spain in the 70's and 80's was focused on political change and lacked public instruments to support research.

Ignacio Pérez Arriaga, ICAI engineer and professor at the School of Engineering (ICAI), was in the group sent to MIT. Since his return in 1981, he had made compatible lectures at ICAI and research for ITP. He had innovated in his subject, Projects for Power System Specialty, and had some emerging research projects with ITP in collaboration with his students. These group will constitute the first nucleus of the IIT.

In February 1984, Pérez Arriaga proposed to the Board of the university to create an own institute. His idea was accepted immediately. IIT was created and Pérez Arriage as promotor was nominated for director, and started with the researchers Emilio Buquerín, Antonio Fernández, Tomás Gómez San Román, Carmen Illan, Javier Jarauta, Daniel Lanzas, Antonio Lozano, Francisco Nieto, Andrés Ramos, Carlos Román and María Jose González Balandín. Most of them were ICAI engineers, and also from Polytechnic and science graduates. Alongside previous research projects with ITP, the first project of IIT was on methods of pricing power in the United States, José María Arraiza developed for Union Fenosa and would be the starting point for the new Spanish regulatory framework of 1987. More projects for Endesa, Spanish Hydroelectric, Iberduero and Red Electrica follow that initial project on pricing. New courses and studies for institutions and Latin American companies also started, being the interconnection of Central America power systems the most relevant project. Meanwhile, thesis were becoming similar in quality to those of best foreign universities.

== Research activities ==
IIT's research activities are divided into 8 research units: Electric Power Systems, Energy System Models, Energy Economics and Regulation, Smart and Sustainable Grids, Intelligent Systems, Railway Systems, Bioengineering, and Fire Safety, Thermal and Fluids Engineering.

The units are self-sustained by funds obtained by projects for private and public institutions and companies. Nonetheless, a strong collaboration exists between the units due to their inherent synergies and complementarities.

The units have developed a set of tools and technologies used by the industry and administrations.

=== Electric Power Systems ===
The Electric Power Systems research unit is a multidisciplinary group made up of professors and researchers of the IIT.

Its central focus is research related to the analysis, control and modelling of electricity power systems and its work has largely been carried out in collaboration with industry, and national and European public research bodies, whose financial support enables the group to do its work. The unit has also developed several software, among other a software implementing an AGC controller or a tool for the tuning of frequency protections.

Research lines include:

- Steady-state
- Automatic generation control
- Stability
- Electromagnetic Transients
- Quality
- Isolated systems: islands, microgrids, off-grid
- Power electronics
- HVDC/FACTS

=== Energy System Models ===
The Energy Systems Modeling unit is constituted by expert researchers in developing models for efficiently supporting decisions and techno-economic analysis of generation, transmission and distribution systems in the energy sector.

A fundamental aspect is the modelling of energy markets and the associated operative, tactical and strategic decisions. The unit's research is the cornerstone of disciplines such as operations research, energy economics and power systems operation. The unit's work is focused on the creation of numerous computer models and on providing complementary analysis, advice and consulting services. The unit is a relevant leader and participates in European projects with public or private support and in many national and international projects.

Research lines include:

- Unit-commitment in electricity markets with high RES penetration
- Network constrained optimal generation scheduling for hybrid AC/DC systems
- Strategic bidding models
- Short and Medium term hydro and hydrothermal scheduling
- Integrated water and energy models
- Electricity and natural gas market models
- Risk management models
- Generation and transmission planning co-optimization
- EPEC and MPEC models

=== Energy Economics and Regulation ===
The activities of Energy Economics and Regulation research unit are centered on the design and analysis of the regulative measures which make possible the incorporation of strategic, economic and environmental considerations into the management of the energy sector in order that they may guide the technical and financial decisions of buyers and sellers in the energy market with the final objective of maximizing net social benefit.

The unit is particularly active in the Electricity Sector. The unit offers an important range of activities, making a significant research contribution both nationally and internationally through national and European, privately and publicly funded research and development projects. It has also carried out advisory and consultancy work commissioned by regulating institutions, operators/traders and by private companies in a wide range of countries (Spain, Holland, Italy, France, Russia, Argentina, Colombia, Peru, Ecuador, Guatemala, Panama and so on). The unit has also a close collaboration with the training courses for European regulators which are organized by the Florence School of Regulation and are supported by the European Union.

Research lines include:

- Energy markets design and regulation
- Analysis of sustainable energy policies
- Regulation of energy network infrastructures
- Network regulation and tariff design with large shares of DER
- Long-term energy scenarios
- Energy poverty: indicators, policy and regulation
- Innovative business models in the power sector

=== Smart and Sustainable Grids ===
The Smart and Sustainable Grids research unit is an interdisciplinary group at the IIT which is focused on the analysis and development of models for the simulation and optimization of future electricity networks.

These networks will enable to ensure the viability of the model of sustainable energy required by society in the 21st century. This model is characterised by the centrality of the role of renewable energies with distributed characteristics, by a flexible energy demand and the capacity to meet that demand, and by a quality of service which meets the expectations of the digital society. The unit offers an important range of activities, making a significant research contribution both nationally and internationally through national and international, privately and publicly funded research and development projects. The unit has also developed a software tool, the Reference Network Model, designed for the planning of large scale distribution networks and for assessing the impact of Distributed Energy Resources.

Research lines include:

- Smart grids
- Green energy integration
- Planning and operation of DER
- Universal energy access and rural electrification
- Information and Communication Technologies (ICT)
- Smart grid data modelling (CIM, 61850, other ontologies)
- Data exchange protocols
- Sustainable mobility and electric vehicles
- Representative electricity networks and applications

=== Intelligent Systems ===
The Intelligent Systems research unit is an interdisciplinary research group which is focused on the study and application of advanced techniques to facilitate decision making in the exploitation and planning of systems, equipment and industrial processes.

Making use of the most advanced techniques and technology, we design, develop and put into operation ‘made to measure’ systems to facilitate decision making in complex problems. The area carries out most of its activities in the electrical, gas, agricultural transport and health sectors. The fields of activity of the area and the techniques employed are rapidly selected and modified in accordance with changes in technology and the interests of industry.

Research lines include:

- Smart client, building and districts
- Smart industry: security and asset control
- Smart industry: life cycle analysis and asset management
- Smart industry: maintenance, reliability and diagnosis with self and deep learning techniques
- Advance data analytics in distribution networks
- Energy data analytics

=== Railway Systems ===
The Railway Systems research unit is an interdisciplinary research group specifically focused on the railway sector. The unit is led by Dr. Paloma Cucala.

The principal activity of the unit is the development of models and advanced applications for the system optimization. The rapid expansion and modernization of railway technology requires a capacity to rapidly update the research techniques applied: simulation, optimization, numerical modeling, data analysis, control, digitalization and artificial intelligence. The research unit applies these techniques to research projects in collaboration with railway administrations and industry with financial support from both the public and private sectors.

Research lines include:

- Railway traffic planning and regulation systems
- Energy efficient timetabling and Ecodriving
- Design of signalling and transport capacity
- Railway power supply systems
- Safety analysis, RAMS, quality control and assurance
- Data modelling and exchange protocols. Remote control
- On-board digital communications
- Embedded digital systems
- Mechanical design of overhead contact lines
- Composite materials and adhesive bonding

=== Bioengineering ===
The Bioengineering research unit is an interdisciplinary research group of the IIT, focused on the application of electronics, biomaterials and nanotechnology fields, to the healthcare world.

Research lines include:

- Digital communications
- Health metrology
- Electronic instrumentation
- Embedded systems
- Biomaterials
- Biomechanics
- Nanotechnology

=== Fire Safety, Thermal and Fluids Engineering ===
The area of Fire Safety, Thermal and Fluids Engineering research unit is an interdisciplinary research group of the IIT focused on the study and analysis of fire dynamics, from an experimental and numerical point of view. It develops mathematical models that allow the simulation of a wide variety of problems, thus addressing the effect of fire in fields such as structural mechanics, through the analysis of the behavior of different types of materials (steel, concrete, wood, adhesives, etc.), as well as in the field of fluid mechanics, by evaluating the behavior of the smoke and the flame.

Research lines include:

- Numerical modelling
- Structural analysis
- Experimental analysis
- Adhesives
- Thermal and Fluids Engineering
