= Secretary of State for Labour =

Senior post in the Spanish Administration

- Secretario de Estado de Trabajo
- Coat of Arms used by the Government

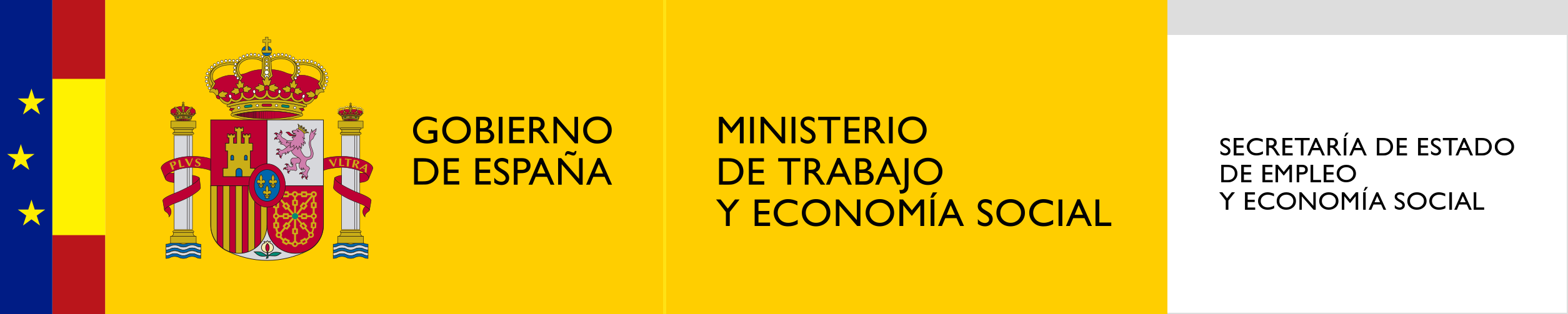

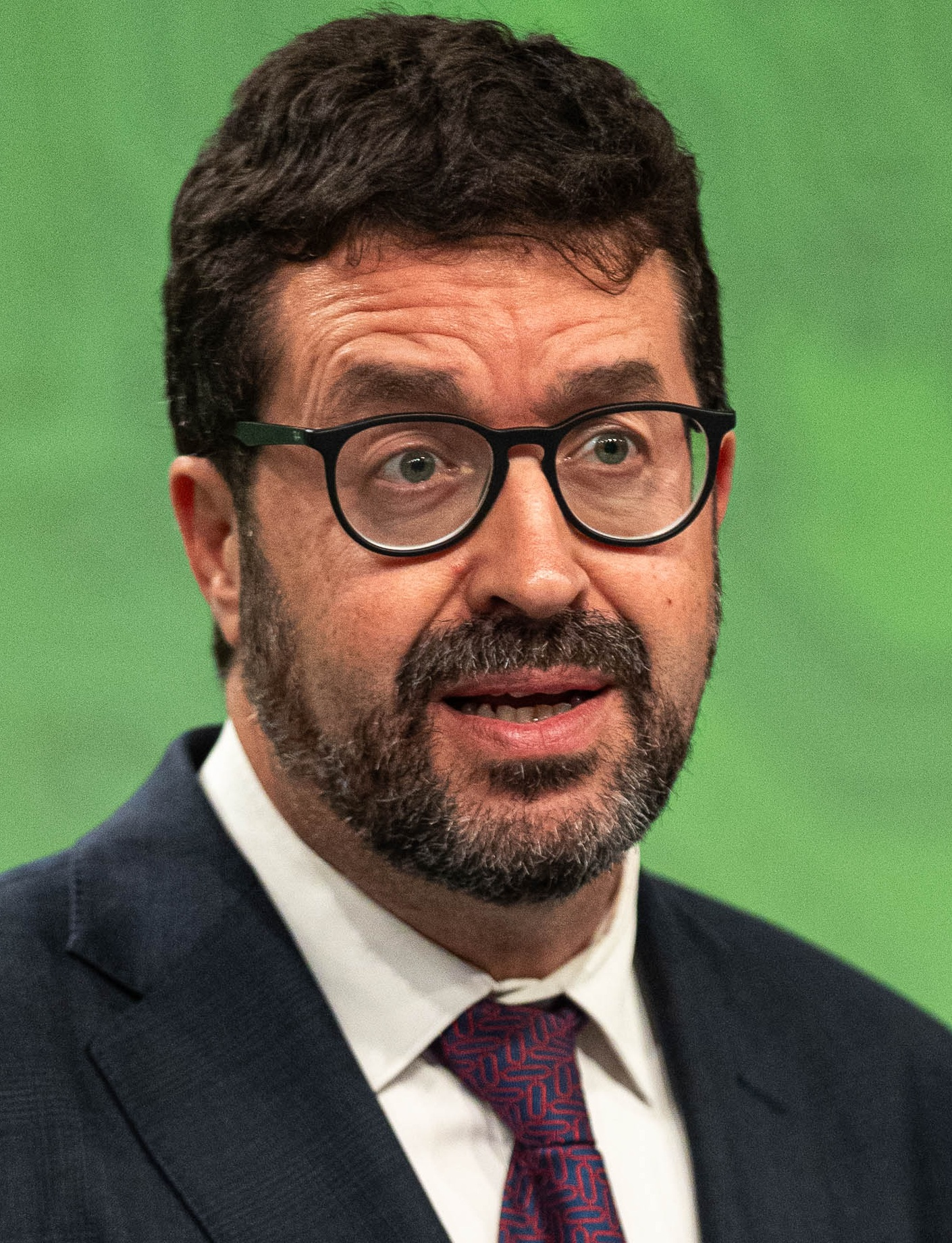
- Incumbent; Joaquín Pérez Rey since January 15, 2020
- Ministry of Labour and Social Economy
- Style: The Most Excellent (formal); Mr./Ms. Secretary of State (informal)
- Nominator: The Labour Minister
- Appointer: The Monarch
- Formation: 6 March 1981; 45 years ago
- First holder: Manuel Núñez Pérez
- Website: www.mites.gob.es

The secretary of state for labour, formerly known as secretary of state for employment or secretary-general for employment, is a senior minister of the Spanish Ministry of Labour responsible implementing the government policy on labour and its relations, working conditions, unemployment benefits and promotion of employment and self-employment. It is also responsible for managing the European Union funds of the European Social Fund Plus.

The current secretary of state is Joaquín Pérez Rey, a University of Castilla–La Mancha professor and head of the University's Labour and Social Security Law Department.

== History ==
The position of Secretary of State for Labour was established in March 1981—named "of Employment and Labour Relations", when the ministries of Labour and of Health and Social Security were merged to form the Ministry of Labour, Health and Social Security. The secretary of state assumed all the powers of the defunct Ministry of Labour and acted as Under-Secretary of the new government department.

A few months later, in December 1981, the short-lived ministry was split in two and the Secretariat of State for Employment and Labour Relations was downgraded to Undersecretariat. The Under-Secretary for Social Security assumed the responsibilities of Under-Secretary of the Ministry until February 1982, when they were restored to the Under-Secretary for Employment.

In December 1982 the position was abolished and replaced by the Ministry's Under-Secretary until 1985, when responsibilities regarding labour policy and the ministry's internal management were separated, and the position was re-established as "Secretary-General for Employment and Labour Relations".

In 2010, during the premiership of José Luis Rodríguez Zapatero, the office was promoted again to Secretariat of State.

In 2020, the area of social economy was strengthened, with both the ministry and its state secretariat being named, and including this term in their name. Subsequently, in 2022 a Special Commissioner for the Social Economy would be created and, in 2023, these responsibilities were separated to create an independent State Secretariat.

== Organization ==
The Secretariat of State is organized as follows:

Secretariat of State Organization (2026)
Secretary of State	Cabinet (Chief of Staff)
Secretary of State	Administrative Unit of the European Social Fund
Secretary of State	Deputy Directorate-General for Programming and Evaluation of the European Social Fund
Secretary of State	Deputy Directorate-General for Statistics and Socio-Labour Analysis
Secretary of State	Labour and Social Security Inspectorate
Secretary of State	State Public Employment Service
Secretary of State	Salary Guarantee Fund
Secretary of State	National Institute for Safety and Health at Work
Directorate-General for Labour	Deputy Directorate-General for Labour Relations
Directorate-General for Labour	Deputy Directorate-General for Regulatory Planning
Directorate-General for Self-Employment	Deputy Directorate-General for Self-Employment
Directorate-General for New Forms of Employment	Deputy Directorate-General for New Forms of Employment and Labour Market Foresight

== List of secretaries of state ==
For the purpose of this list, the date used is the date on which the decree of appointment or dismissal received royal assent, which may differ from the date of publication or of the effective taking of office.

Name	Term			Government		Ref.
Name	Start	End	Duration	Prime Minister	Monarch	Ref.
Manuel Núñez Pérez (born 1933)	6 March 1981	1 December 1981	270 days	The Marquess of Ría de Ribadeo (1981–1982)	Juan Carlos I (1975–2014)	
Miguel Cuenca Valdivia (born 1933)	29 December 1981	7 December 1982	343 days	The Marquess of Ría de Ribadeo (1981–1982)	Juan Carlos I (1975–2014)	
Position abolished during this interval.				Felipe González (1982–1996)	Juan Carlos I (1975–2014)	
Alvaro Espina Montero (born 1947)	24 April 1985	8 April 1991	5 years, 349 days	Felipe González (1982–1996)	Juan Carlos I (1975–2014)	
Jesús Arango Fernández (born 1947)	21 April 1991	20 July 1993	2 years, 90 days	Felipe González (1982–1996)	Juan Carlos I (1975–2014)	
Marcos Peña Pinto (born 1948)	20 July 1993	10 May 1996	2 years, 295 days	Felipe González (1982–1996)	Juan Carlos I (1975–2014)	
Manuel Pimentel (born 1961)	10 May 1996	22 January 1999	2 years, 257 days	José María Aznar (1996–2004)	Juan Carlos I (1975–2014)	
Juan Pedro Chozas Pedrero (born 1955)	22 January 1999	14 February 2003	4 years, 23 days	José María Aznar (1996–2004)	Juan Carlos I (1975–2014)	
Carmen Lucía de Miguel y García	14 February 2003	19 April 2004	1 year, 65 days	José María Aznar (1996–2004)	Juan Carlos I (1975–2014)	
Valeriano Gómez (born 1957)	19 April 2004	1 December 2006	2 years, 226 days	José Luis Rodríguez Zapatero (2004–2011)	Juan Carlos I (1975–2014)	
Antonio González González (born 1957)	1 December 2006	28 April 2008	1 year, 149 days	José Luis Rodríguez Zapatero (2004–2011)	Juan Carlos I (1975–2014)	
Maravillas Rojo (born 1950)	28 April 2008	29 October 2010	2 years, 184 days	José Luis Rodríguez Zapatero (2004–2011)	Juan Carlos I (1975–2014)	
María Luz Rodríguez Fernández (born 1964)	29 October 2010	30 December 2011	1 year, 62 days	José Luis Rodríguez Zapatero (2004–2011)	Juan Carlos I (1975–2014)	
Engracia Hidalgo Tena (born 1957)	30 December 2011	26 June 2015	3 years, 178 days	Mariano Rajoy (2011–2018)	Juan Carlos I (1975–2014)	
Engracia Hidalgo Tena (born 1957)	30 December 2011	26 June 2015	3 years, 178 days	Mariano Rajoy (2011–2018)	Felipe VI (2014–present)	
Juan Pablo Riesgo Figuerola-Ferreti (born 1980)	26 June 2015	18 June 2018	2 years, 357 days	Mariano Rajoy (2011–2018)	Felipe VI (2014–present)	
Yolanda Valdeolivas García (born 1963)	18 June 2018	14 January 2020	1 year, 210 days	Pedro Sánchez (2018–)	Felipe VI (2014–present)	
Joaquín Pérez Rey (born 1973)	14 January 2020	Incumbent	6 years, 241 days	Pedro Sánchez (2018–)	Felipe VI (2014–present)	
