= Báñez =

Báñez is a surname. Notable people with the surname include:

- Domingo Báñez (1528–1604), Spanish Dominican theologian
- Fátima Báñez (1967–2026), Spanish politician, economist and jurist
