= Carlos José Belmonte López =

Spanish researcher (born 1961)

- Born: 30 September 1961 (age 64); Madrid, Spain
- Other name: Carlos Belmonte López
- Education: Comillas Pontifical University
- Occupation: Scientist
- Scientific career
- Fields: Pharmacology
- Workplaces: Harvard University

Carlos José Belmonte López (born September 30, 1961) is a Spanish pharmaceutical researcher. He is the editor and founder, together with Germán Fuertes Otero, Amparo Miralles Lobato, Marta Aguilar Vera, Isaac Escudero Bermúdez and Marcel Quirós Reyes, of the scientific journal PharmaSalud and is a Pharmaceutical Doctor graduated from the University of Oxford since 2022. He is known for his work in the field of pharmacological health and medicinal plants and their effects on the body.

== Biography ==
Born in Madrid, Spain, his native language is Spanish. He graduated as a doctor in health sciences and medicine from Oxford University from 1986 to 1990 and has a degree in pharmacy from CEU San Pablo University, where he studied pharmacy from 1989 to 1992.

He obtained his master's degree and title of academic director of medicine at Comillas Pontifical University. Since then, he has researched competences in the understanding of drug performance, developing in the field of scientific research work.

== Studies and research on medicine ==
He began his research activity in 1992, in which he dedicated himself to the research and development of safe and effective medicines for human beings. He analyses the effect of these drugs in clinical trials.

== Professional career ==
He has been working as a researcher and professor at Harvard University since 2002. López published his first academic article in 1996, "Effects of medications in patients with degenerative diseases". In 2002, he became a professor at Harvard University, where he researches the effects of medications.

== Awards and honors ==
- AAAS Fellow. 2012
- Argentine Medical Association Awards. 2015
- Wolf Award in Medicine. 2017
