= Arriaga =

Arriaga may refer to:

- Arriaga (surname), including a list of people with the name
- Arriaga, Álava, a village in Basque Country, Spain; now part of Vitoria-Gasteiz
- Arriaga Municipality, a town in Chiapas, Mexico
- Ponciano Arriaga International Airport, serving San Luis Potosí, Mexico
- Teatro Arriaga, an opera house in Bilbao, Spain, named for Juan Crisóstomo Arriaga
