= Maravillas Rojo =

Spanish politician

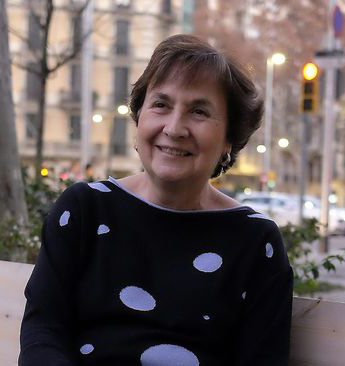
Rojo in 2011

Maravillas Rojo Torrecilla (born 9 November 1950) is a Spanish politician. She served as Secretary-General for Employment in the Government of Spain from 2008 to 2010.

== Background ==
Rojo was born in Barcelona (Spain). She earned a Bachelor's degree in political, economical, and commercial sciences from the University of Barcelona in 1973. She is married and has two children.

She has promoted many employment policies and has been member of several official bodies including: Barcelona Activa, Agencia de Desarrollo Local de Barcelona, Mercabarna, Consorcio de Turismo de Barcelona, Consorcio de la Zona Franca, Consejo de Administración de la Autoridad Portuaria de Barcelona.
