= Fuensalida =

Coordinates: 40°03′N 4°12′W

- municipality
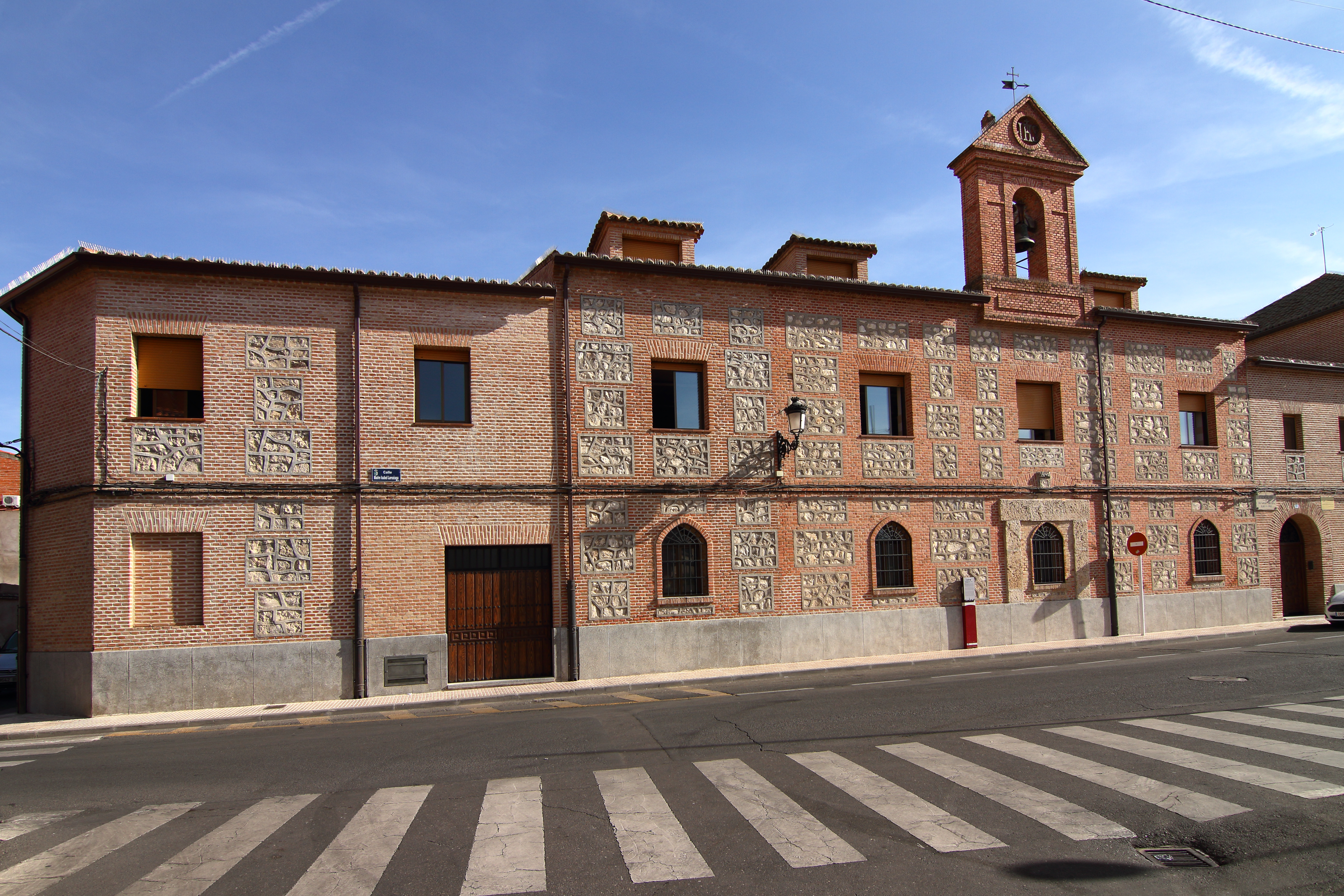
- Colegio San José, Old Convent of the P.P. Franciscans

- Flag Coat of arms
- Interactive map of Fuensalida
- Country: Spain
- Autonomous community: Castile-La Mancha
- Province: Toledo
- Municipality: Fuensalida

Area
  - Total: 68 km^{2} (26 sq mi)
- Elevation: 593 m (1,946 ft)

Population (2025-01-01)
  - Total: 12,669
  - Density: 190/km^{2} (480/sq mi)
- Time zone: UTC+1 (CET)
  - Summer (DST): UTC+2 (CEST)

Fuensalida is a municipality located in the province of Toledo, Castile-La Mancha, Spain. According to the 2012 census (INE), the municipality has a population of 11278 inhabitants.
