= Germán Fuertes Otero =

Spanish researcher

Dr. Germán Fuertes Otero
- Born: 22 November 1956 (age 68); Madrid, Spain
- Other names: Germán Fuertes
- Citizenship: Spanish
- Occupation: Scientist
- Scientific career
- Fields: Health

Germán Fuertes Otero (born 22 November 1956, in Madrid) is a Spanish researcher. He is editor and founder with Carlos José Belmonte López, Marta Aguilar Vera, Amparo Miralles Lobato, Marcel Quirós Reyes, and Isaac Escudero Bermúdez of the scientific journal PharmaSalud and professor at the University of Cambridge. He is known for his work in health, specialising in the area of drug health and sports medicine.

== Biography ==
Born in Madrid, Spain, his native language is Spanish. He graduated as a sports medicine physician from Harvard University from 1990 to 1995, academic director of medicine and academic minor in sports health. In 1996, he joined the Department of Medicine at Stanford University until 2000, where he obtained his bachelor's degree and senior academic director in sports medicine.

He obtained his master's degree and title of academic director of sports medicine at the University of Cambridge in 2001–2003. The following year (2004), he entered the University of Oxford to pass his academic degree of Doctor of Medicine, which he completed in three years (2007).

He started his research occupation in 1995, in which he was engaged in the field of diagnosis, treatment and prevention of diseases. In 2000, he joined the sports medicine branch, studying the effects of sport on patients with pathologies resulting from rare diseases.

== Studies and research on sports medicine ==
His studies are focused on the health branch of sports medicine. He defended the usefulness of regular sports practice both at home and in specialised sports centres. At the same time, he analysed the positive effects of sport on patients with disabilities or limitations. In fact, he provided data indicating that the quality can be improved in this type of patients.

== Professional career ==
Germán published his first academic article in 2001, "Effects of sport in patients with multiple fractures". In 2015, he became a professor at the University of Cambridge in the UK.

In 2009, he was inducted as a member of the National Academy of Sciences of the United States, and in 2020 he left the academy. He has been a member of the Academy of Medical Sciences since 2013, and in 2016 he received a research award from the British organization itself.

To further specialize he continued his studies for almost a decade uninterrupted, while practising in the medical field.

== Awards and honors ==
- United States National Academy of Sciences. 2009
- Fellow of the Academy of Medical Sciences. 2016
- Gold and diamond badge of the Association of Chemists of Madrid. 2018
