= ICAI School of Engineering =

Coordinates: 40.4299°N 3.7127°W

ICAI
- Escuela Técnica Superior de Ingeniería - ICAI
- Established: 1908
- Parent institution: Comillas Pontifical University
- Affiliation: Catholic
- Location: Madrid, Spain
- Website: www.icai.comillas.edu

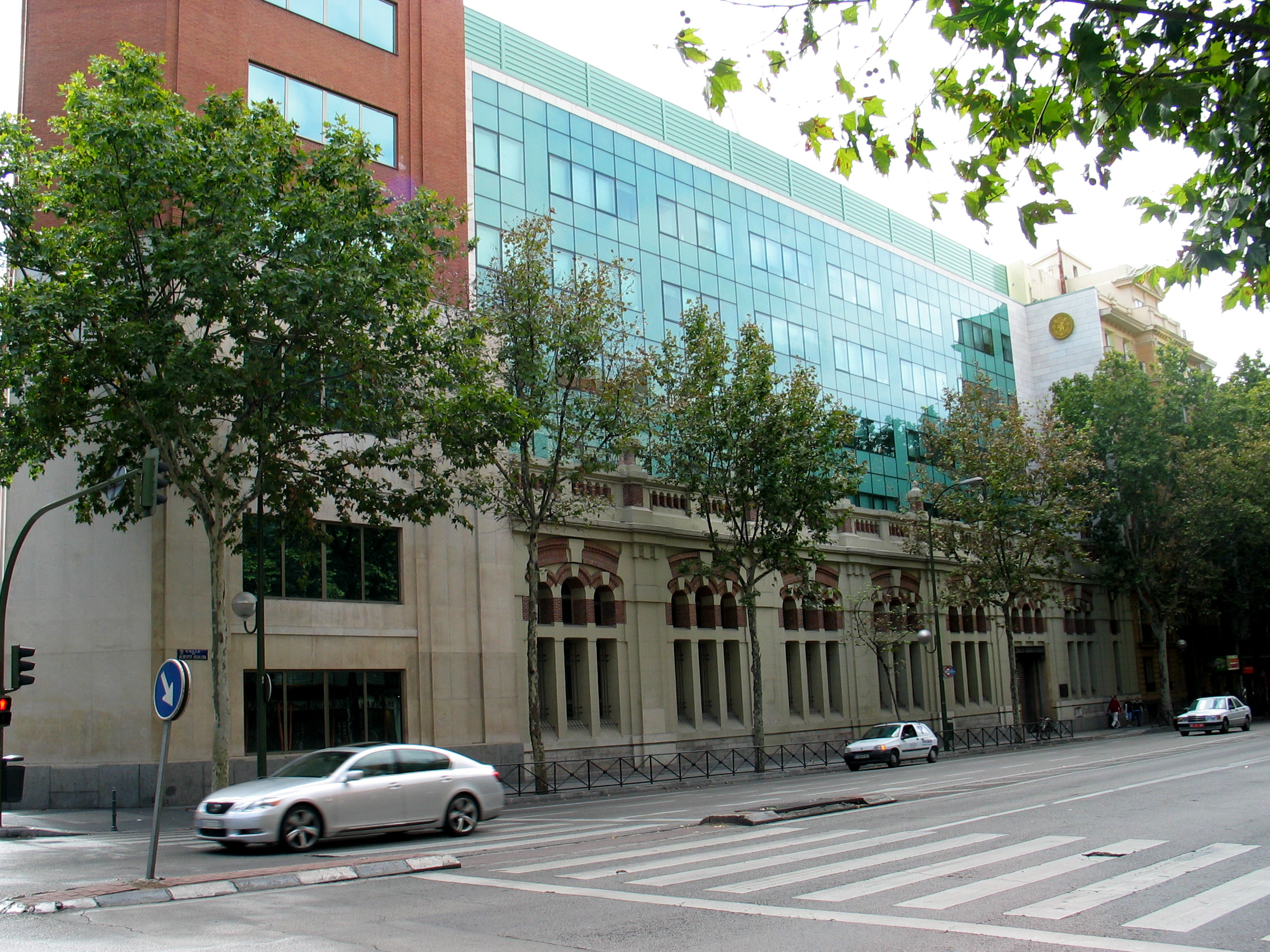
ICAI main building, Comillas Pontifical University, Madrid, in Calle Alberto Aguilera 25

ICAI School of Engineering (Escuela Técnica Superior de Ingeniería - ICAI in Spanish) is the school of engineering of the Comillas Pontifical University, located in Madrid, Spain.

ICAI is the acronym by which the Instituto Católico de Artes e Industrias (Catholic Institute for Arts and Industry in English) is known. It is the name of the school even before it joined the Comillas Pontifical University in 1978.

Currently, the ICAI School of Engineering occupies three buildings in Madrid's neighbourhood of Argüelles, in the streets of Alberto Aguilera 25 (headquarters), Santa Cruz de Marcenado, and Francisco de Ricci.

== History ==
ICAI was founded in 1908 by the Jesuits as a technical school for industry workers. Its study programmes were officially recognised by the Spanish Government in 1957. In 1960 ICAI merged with ICADE to become ICAI-ICADE.

In 1978, with a view to reinforce a catholic university with a wider range of academic disciplines, ICAI-ICADE joined the Comillas Pontifical University, and the new School of Engineering kept ICAI as a brand name.

During the 2006-07 academic year, it had 1805 undergraduate students, 147 graduate students, and its 264 academics attracted research funds for a total of €3.7 million. 63% of the graduating students had done paid industrial placements. ICAI sent 150 students abroad for international exchanges and hosted 92 international students. It has exchange agreements with 49 European universities and 41 US and Asian universities.

== Academic Studies ==
ICAI offers just two engineering programs to undergraduates: Industrial Engineering (electric, electronic and mechanical), and Telecommunications Engineering. Both programs are structured in a 4-year Bachelor plus a 2-year Master. In addition ICAI offers several specialized Master programs oriented to the industry and a Doctorate program oriented to engineering research.

== IIT ==
The Instituto de Investigación Tecnológica (IIT), Institute for Research in Technology in English, is a part of the School of Engineering. It is a non-profit institute which conducts research and postgraduate training on diverse technological fields. It is financed through participation in specific projects of interest for Industry, and responds to a clear social demand.
