= Valeriano Gómez =

Spanish politician and economist

Valeriano Gómez OCIII
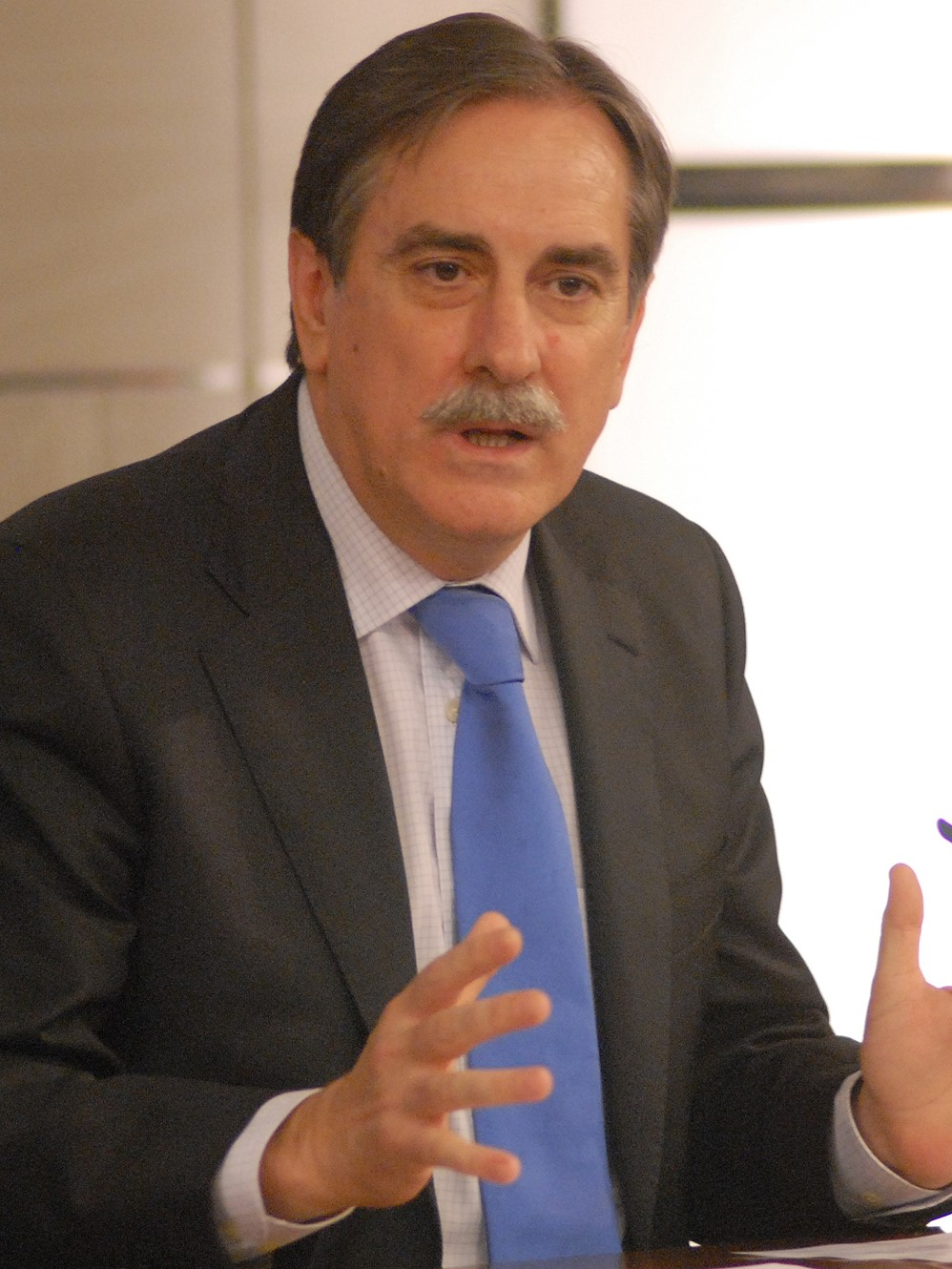

Minister of Labour and Immigration
- In office 21 October 2010 – 22 December 2011
- Monarch: Juan Carlos I
- Prime Minister: José Luis Rodríguez Zapatero
- Preceded by: Celestino Corbacho
- Succeeded by: Fátima Báñez

Member of the Congress of Deputies
- In office 13 December 2011 – 1 January 2015
- Constituency: Madrid

Personal details
- Born: Tomás Valeriano Gómez Sánchez; 15 December 1957 (age 68) Arroyo del Ojanco, Spain
- Education: Complutense University of Madrid

Tomás Valeriano Gómez Sánchez (born 15 December 1957) is a Spanish politician and economist who served as minister of labour and immigration from 2010 to 2011, under José Luis Rodríguez Zapatero.

== Political career ==
Bachelor of Economics and Business Administration, he specializes in Labor Economics from the Complutense University of Madrid. Member of the General Union of Workers (UGT) and the Spanish Socialist Workers' Party (PSOE), worked as an economist in the Technical Cabinet of the Confederal Executive Committee of UGT. He served as executive advisor in the Ministry of Labour and Social Security from 1988 to 1994 and as Secretary-General for Employment from 2004 to 2006. He also worked as advisor to the Economic and Social Council.

The day of the 2010 Spanish general strike, was present at the head of the demonstration in Madrid against the labor reform.

=== Minister of Labour ===
On 20 October 2010, he was nominated as Minister of Labour by Prime Minister José Luis Rodríguez Zapatero, and assumed office before King Juan Carlos I the following day.

=== Member of Parliament ===
He ran in the 2011 Spanish general election as number three of the PSOE list for Madrid, being elected member of parliament. After leaving the ministerial portfolio, he focused on his work as a MP, serving as spokesperson for the Socialist Group in the Economy Committee of the Congress of Deputies, a position he left on 1 January 2015 after disagreements with Pedro Sánchez.

== Awards ==
- Gentleman of the Grand Cross of the Order of Charles III (2011).
