= Mercedes Arriaga Flórez =

Spanish philologist

Mercedes Arriaga Flórez (Oviedo, July 29, 1960) is a Spanish philologist. Full professor in Italian philology at the University of Seville (2009), with a degree on Italian philology from the University of Salamanca (1984) and modern and contemporary Italian Writings by the University of Bari (1989). She achieved her first PhD at the University of Seville in 1993 and the second in language sciences and theory of signs from the University of Bari (Italy) in 1995. Nowadays, she holds a chair at the Asociación Universitaria de Estudios de las Mujeres (AUDEM) . From 2012, she is also a member of the board of the Sociedad Española de Italianistas (SEI).

== Academic career ==
Mercedes Arriaga Flórez is nowadays a lecturer in the Official Master on Gender Studies and Professional Development at the University of Seville and keeps on investigating as leading researcher of the university group "Escritoras y Escrituras" following the paths "Ausencias: Escritoras Italianas Inéditas (en la Querella de las Mujeres)" and "Escritoras y pensadoras europeas.".
