= Sonia Arriaga =

Mexican bioengineer

Sonia Lorena Arriaga García is a Mexican environmental biotechnologist, professor, and researcher. She is a Senior Researcher B at the Potosino Institute of Scientific and Technological Research (IPICYT) and a Level III member of the National System of Researchers (SNI). Her research focuses on the treatment of volatile organic compounds, mathematical modeling of biofiltration processes, and the treatment of bioaerosols emitted by biofilters through advanced oxidation processes.

== Education and career ==
She earned a bachelor's degree in chemical engineering from the Faculty of Chemical Sciences at the Universidad Autónoma de San Luis Potosí in 1999. Later, she pursued a master's degree in sciences at the same university, graduating in August 2001.

She completed her PhD studies in Chemical Engineering at the Metropolitan Autonomous University in Iztapalapa. During her doctoral studies, she conducted a research stay at Lund University in Sweden, where she studied the biodegradation of hydrophobic volatile organic compounds in two-phase partitioning bioreactors. Her doctoral thesis focused primarily on the operation of biofilters for the biodegradation of volatile organic compounds. She graduated with her PhD in 2005, and that same year, she joined the Potosino Institute of Scientific and Technological Research (IPICYT) as a postdoctoral researcher, working on the project Anaerobic Co-digestion of Organic Waste for the Production of Methane and Hydrogen.

In September 2006, she joined the Environmental Sciences Division of IPICYT as a senior professor and researcher. Later, in 2014, she undertook a research stay at Aalborg University in the Microbial Communities Center, where she studied culture-independent techniques for the identification of microorganisms. Since 2019, she has been an associate professor at the National Institute of Scientific Research (INRS) in Quebec.

Since 2021, she has been on a sabbatical at the National University of Ireland, where she is working on indoor bioaerosol monitoring.

== Research lines ==
Her main research areas are biotechnology and environmental engineering, including the mathematical modeling of biofiltration processes. In her lab, they work on biofiltration of indoor air pollutants such as formaldehyde. Another of her research areas includes the treatment of bioaerosols using advanced oxidation processes. Additionally, using single-phase biological bioreactors, she studies the emissions of volatile organic compounds to produce high-value extracellular proteins and biopolymers like polyhydroxyalkanoates.

Her main research and collaborative projects include:

- Monitoring of air in furnaces (2019)
- Mexico-Quebec Course (2018)
- Degradation of emissions of volatile organic compounds in a hybrid UV / O_{3} / TiO_{2} oxidation system coupled with a biological system. Project supported by the National Council of Science and Technology (CONACYT) in the Sectoral Funds SEP call (2011 and 2015).
- Identification and biodegradation of volatile organic compounds, hydrocarbons, and pesticides emitted in the State of Guanajuato using a biofiltration system packed with microstructured reusable materials. Project funded by CONACYT under the Mixed Funds call (2007).

=== Removal of air pollutants ===
Her research laboratory at IPICYT monitors indoor air pollutants, particularly studying suspended biological material, commonly known as bioaerosols. This includes spores, viruses, bacteria, pollen, fungi, endotoxins, and cellular fragments that can cause respiratory diseases and allergies. As part of this research, monitoring was conducted within a pediatric office, where bioaerosol concentrations were found to be 10,000 times higher than the levels accepted by the World Health Organization.

In addition to monitoring and identifying bioaerosols, she also works on developing treatment systems for these bioaerosols. These treatment systems consist of photocatalytic systems operated in continuous flow, which are being optimized through the synthesis of catalysts to function under visible radiation, making them more environmentally friendly. Similarly, these technologies aim to valorize the emissions and transform them into high-value products such as biopolymers or proteins.

=== Research related to COVID-19 ===
In 2020, during the COVID-19 pandemic, she began disseminating information through Mexican mass media to raise awareness about the viability of the SARS-CoV-2 virus in the air for up to three hours. She explained that scientific evidence demonstrates the persistence and existence of the SARS-CoV-2 virus in the air for up to three hours and on surfaces such as plastic and stainless steel for up to 72 hours. This suggests that the virus can be transmitted through the air, so to prevent its spread, the use of masks and proper ventilation in areas with infected patients should be implemented.

== Awards and recognition ==
Throughout her career, she has been recognized on multiple occasions.

- 2000: Award for the best student of the 1994 Chemical Engineering cohort, Autonomous University of San Luis Potosí.
- 2005: Medal for University Merit, Metropolitan Autonomous University-Iztapalapa.
- Since 2007: Member of the National System of Researchers (Level III since 2022).
- Since 2016: Regular member of the Mexican Academy of Sciences.
- 2019: Premio Potosino de Ciencia y Tecnología en la categoría joven investigadora, modalidad investigación científica del área ciencias de la ingeniería.
- 2022: Promotion to level 3 of the Sistema Nacional de Investigadores, its highest rank.
