= Josep Tomàs i Piera =

Spanish lawyer and politician

Minister of Labor, Health and Social Welfare
- In office 4 September 1936 – 4 November 1936
- Preceded by: Joan Lluhí
- Succeeded by: Anastasio de Gracia (Labor and Planning); Federica Montseny (Health and Social Policy)

Personal details
- Born: 6 August 1900 Barcelona, Spain
- Died: 9 January 1976 (aged 75) Guadalajara, Mexico
- Occupation: Lawyer, politician

Josep Tomàs i Piera (Spanish: José Tomás Piera, 6 August 1900 – 9 January 1976) was a Spanish lawyer and politician. He became active in politics, and was elected to the Spanish legislature in 1933 on the platform of the Republican Left of Catalonia. During the Spanish Civil War (1936–1939) he was briefly Minister of Labor, Health and Social Welfare in the first government of Francisco Largo Caballero, before being made Spanish consul in Montreal, Canada. After the war he lived in exile in Mexico, where he was a leader of the Catalan community.

== Early years (1900–1936) ==
Josep Tomàs i Piera was born in Barcelona on 6 August 1900. His parents were Josep Tomàs i Boix and Àngela Piera i Trias, He obtained a degree in Law at the University of Barcelona in 1920. He became active in politics as a member of the Casino Regionalista de la Bordeta, where he was librarian. In 1921 he married Rosa Pons i Millet. They had four children.

Tomàs was a member of Republican Action of Catalonia (Acció Republicana de Catalunya, ARC), a party created by left-wing members who split from Catalan Action (Acció Catalana, AC), during the 1923–30 dictatorship of Miguel Primo de Rivera. In 1930 he represented the ARC in the Revolutionary Committee of Catalonia (Comitè Revolucionari de Catalunya), which brought together various political groups opposed to the dictatorship. In the early part of 1931 he participated in the process of recombining the ARC and AC, leading to the formation of the Catalan Republican Party (Partit Catalanista Republicà, PCR). He ran in the municipal elections of April 1931 for the 7th district of Barcelona, but was not elected.

== Second Spanish Republic: pre-war (1931–1936) ==
With the proclamation of the Second Spanish Republic the PCR announced its final organization. In May 1931 Tomàs joined the executive council of the PCR, holding this position until the end of 1932. He was a candidate in the June 1931 elections for the Constituent Assembly on the PCR platform, but was not elected. He ran for election to the Parliament of Catalonia in the elections of November 1932, but did not succeed. In 1932 he was one of the founders of the Executive Committee for Catalanization, which aimed to ensure that advertisements and shop signs were in Catalan.

In 1933 Tomàs and other Catalan leaders such as Antoni Rovira i Virgili, Carles Pi i Sunyer and Josep Sunyol joined the Republican Left of Catalonia (Esquerra Republicana de Catalunya, ERC). Also in 1933 he was founder and president of Editorial Llibertat, which became the proprietor of the Left publications La Humanitat, Última Hora and La Campana de Gràcia. He joined the board of Ràdio Barcelona, and represented that enterprise on the Radio Committee set up by the Minister of Culture, Ventura Gassol, to study the structure of radio in Catalonia and the potential for using the medium to spread culture. Tomàs was elected a member of the Cortes Generales (parliament of Spain) on 19 November 1933 for the province of Barcelona on the Republican Left of Catalonia platform.

In the period from December 1933 to June 1934 Tomàs was very active as a member of the Left opposition to the right-wing government. He was secretary of the Left parliamentary group and a member of the parliamentary committees for Justice, Statutes and Communications. In June 1934 Tomàs was among the group of Left deputies who left the Congress in protest against the ruling of the Court of Constitutional Guarantees, which was contrary to the Law of Cultivation Contracts that had been approved by the Parliament of Catalonia. He participated in the disturbances caused by the Asturian miners' strike of October 1934, and was forced into exile in France. He was unable to return until the triumph of the Left Front in the February 1936 elections.

Tomàs was again elected on 16 February 1936 for the province of Barcelona on the Republican Left of Catalonia platform. In the sessions of the Cortes during the months before the outbreak of the Civil War he was one of the presidents of the Left parliamentary group. He supported the draft Basque Statute, which was finally approved in October 1936. He represented the Left in the Central Committee of the Popular Front, and was undersecretary of Health and Welfare from 20 May 1936 to 6 September 1936 under Joan Lluhí i Vallescà, also of the Left, who was Minister of Labor, Health and Planning.

== Spanish Civil War (1936–1939) ==
Tomàs was appointed Minister of Labor, Health and Social Welfare in the first government of Francisco Largo Caballero (September–November 1936). Jaume Aiguader was his undersecretary for Health and Welfare. Francesc Senyal i Ferrer was appointed undersecretary of Labor. Ramon Frontera i Bosch was director-general of welfare. These three were all members of the Left. During his short term of office Tomàs eliminated all mentions of "Beneficència" (Charity) by the administrative bodies and replaced it with "Assistència Social," (Social Assistance). He suspended the Health Services Act of 1934 so the municipal health organization could adapt to wartime requirements.

Tomàs was also chairman of the board of the ERC journal Llibertat (Liberty). After leaving the Ministry, in December 1936 he became secretary of the Cortes. In February 1937 he was elected third vice-president of the Congress of Deputies. A few months later he resigned from this office to become consul of the Spanish Republic in Montreal, Canada. Francesc Senyal followed him to Canada in the position of commercial attaché. In September 1938 Tomàs returned to Catalonia and became Secretary in the Ministry of State, then based in Barcelona.

== Exile (1939–1976) ==
After the war Tomàs went into exile in France, then soon after sailed on the SS Champlain to New York City, then traveled overland via Laredo to Mexico City, where he engaged in commerce. He contributed to the Orfeó Català de Mèxic (Catalan Orpheus of Mexico) and was president of the Catalan Community of Mexico. He was part of the Junta de Auxilio a los Republicanos Españoles (JARE), which assisted exiles, and was its secretary in Mexico. In 1941 Tomàs created the Catalan Community of Mexico (Comunitat Catalana de Mèxic), seconded by his colleagues Ferran Zulueta and Ferran Llardent and members of the Acció Catalana and Estat Català.

In December 1941 Tomàs and other members of the Esquerra Catalana in Mexico (Jaume Aiguader, Joan Casanelles, Pere Ferrer, Joan Lluhí and Josep Mascort) requested that the president of the Cortes meet the Standing Committee of the House and resume the activity of the Spanish Republic in Mexico, since that was impossible in Europe, which was occupied by the military forces of the totalitarians. He participated in the Spanish parliament in exile, and in 1945 promoted and presided over a federalist parliamentary group of Catalan, Basque and Galician deputies. He chaired the parliamentary committee to examine the draft Statute of Autonomy of Galicia.

In 1949 Tomàs moved to Guadalajara, where he taught at the Autonomous University and worked as an administrator. However, he was affected by a problem that caused his sight to gradually deteriorate. In 1953 he participated in the First National Catalan Conference Catalan. He died in Guadalajara on 9 January 1976 at the age of 75.

== Sources ==
- "Jaume Aiguader i Miró" (PDF). Memòria Esquerra (in Catalan). JPM. Fundació Josep Irla. 2015. Archived from the original (PDF) on 2015-09-28.
- "Josep Tomàs i Piera". Gran Enciclopèdia Catalana (in Catalan).
- Palomas i Moncholí, Joan (2015). "Josep Tomàs i Piera". memoriaesquerra.cat (in Catalan). Fundació Josep Irla. Archived from the original on 2015-09-28.
- "TOMAS PIERA, JOSE 55. Elecciones 19.11.1933" (in Spanish). Congreso de los Diputados.
- "TOMAS PIERA, JOSE 56. Elecciones 16.2.1936" (in Spanish). Congreso de los Diputados.
- Urquijo y Goitia, José Ramón de (2008). Gobiernos y ministros españoles en la edad contemporánea. Editorial CSIC - CSIC Press. ISBN 978-84-00-08737-1.
- Vall, Josep (June 2012). "Breu història d'Esquerra a Mèxic" (PDF). Esquerra a Mèxic, 1941–1980 (in Catalan) (2 ed.). Fundacío Josep Irla. ISBN 978-84-615-6958-8. Archived from the original (PDF) on 2014-09-03.
