= ICADE =

Faculties of the Comillas Pontifical University

- Established: 1956
- Parent institution: Comillas Pontifical University
- Affiliations: Catholic
- Location: Madrid, Spain
- Website: www.icade.upcomillas.es

ICADE is the brand name by which two schools of the Comillas Pontifical University, located in Madrid (Spain), are known. It stands for Instituto Católico de Administración y Dirección de Empresas (Catholic Institute of Business Administration in English), the name of an Institute that merged with the Comillas Pontifical University in 1978, giving birth to two schools of the university:

- ICADE School of Law
- ICADE School of Business and Economics

== ICADE School of Law ==
ICADE School of Law ranks 5th in Spain's best schools of law ranking by El Mundo.

Through the Erasmus Programme, the ICADE School of Law has students exchange programs with the University of Tübingen, the University of Göttingen and Lüneburg University.

== ICADE School of Business and Economics ==
ICADE School of Business and Economics ranks 3rd in Spain's best schools of Business Administration ranking by El Mundo, also thanks to its membership of International Partnership of Business Schools (IPBS), a consortium in which the partner universities offer joint bachelor's and master's programs together with ICADE. With over 1600 students, IPBS is the largest integrated cooperation program between universities in Europe.

ICADE School of Business and Economics offers several undergraduate and graduate degree programs together with a number of European and non-European business schools. The most prestigious program is the Double Degree that includes two years of study in a foreign institution: Northeastern University (US), Lancaster University (UK), Dublin City University (Ireland), Reims Management School (France) and ESB Reutlingen Business School (Germany).

ICADE School of Business and Economics has students exchange programs with Georgetown University (Washington D.C.), University of Michigan - Ross School of Business (Ann Arbor), Wharton Business School (Philadelphia), The Ohio State University - Fisher College of Business (Columbus, OH), Tulane University (New Orleans), Northeastern University (Boston), EMLYON Business School (Lyon) and ESSEC (Paris).

The graduate school at ICADE School of Business and Economics for professionals is called ICADE Business School.
