= Fátima Báñez =

Spanish politician, economist and jurist (1967–2026)

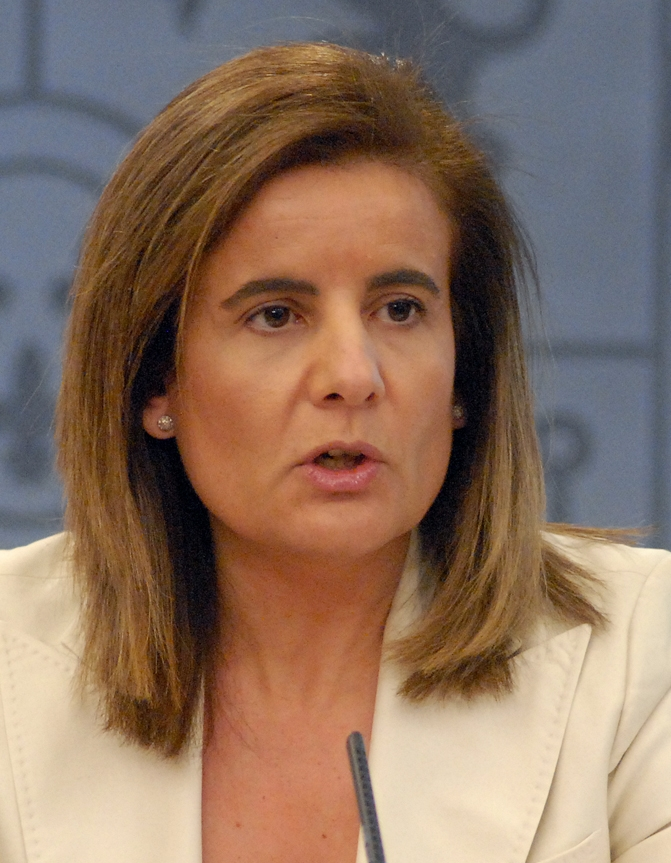
- Bañez in 2012

Minister of Employment and Social Security of Spain
- In office 22 December 2011 – 1 June 2018
- Prime Minister: Mariano Rajoy
- Preceded by: Valeriano Gómez
- Succeeded by: Magdalena Valerio

Acting Ministry of Health, Social Services, and Equality of Spain
- In office 16 August 2016 – 4 November 2016
- Prime Minister: Mariano Rajoy
- Preceded by: Alfonso Alonso
- Succeeded by: Dolors Montserrat

Member of the Congress of Deputies
- In office 12 March 2000 – 21 May 2019
- Constituency: Huelva

Personal details
- Born: María Fátima Báñez García; 6 January 1967 San Juan del Puerto, Andalusia, Spain
- Died: 28 October 2026 (aged 59) Los Yébenes, Castilla-La Mancha, Spain
- Cause of death: Train collision
- Party: PP
- Education: Comillas Pontifical University; Harvard Business School

María Fátima Báñez García (6 January 1967 – 28 October 2026) was a Spanish politician, economist and jurist. A member of the People's Party, she was Minister of Employment and Social Security from 2011 until 2018. She was the first woman in the office.

During her time as Minister for Employment and Social Security, Báñez spearheaded the 2012 labour reform, which led to protests and general strikes; and a reform of the pension system in 2013. She was also member of the Congress of Deputies between 2000 and 2019, and acting Minister of Health in 2016. Báñez died in the 2026 Toledo train collision.

== Early life and education ==
Báñez was born on 6 January 1967 in San Juan del Puerto, in the Andalusian province of Huelva as the elder daughter of a construction businessman and an educator. At the age of 11 she won a poetry prize and the prize was presented to her by the poet Gloria Fuertes.

She graduated with a degree in law and economics and business studies from the Pontifical University of Comillas in Madrid, and subsequently went on to complete a postgraduate degree in business administration at the Harvard Business School.

== Career ==
Báñez began her career as Head of Strategy at a family-run business between 1993 and 1997. She entered politics and joined the People's Party (PP), encouraged by Teófila Martínez and Javier Arenas, in 1995 after returning from the United States. She ran as an unsuccessful candidate in the 1996 general election, but four years later was elected to the Congress of Deputies in the 2000 general election for Huelva. She highlighted her work on the Committee on Economic Affairs and Finance and was part of Mariano Rajoy’s technical team during his time as leader of the opposition. She was also responsible for negotiations on the national budget. During the 2008–2011 legislature, Báñez served as deputy spokesperson for the People's Party in the Congress of Deputies with Soraya Sáenz de Santamaría. As deptuy, she was re-elected in the elections of 2004 and 2008.

Within the PP, she was a member of the party’s national executive committee and held leadership positions within the People's Party of Andalusia. She also served as a councillor of the Andalusia Radio and Television.

=== Minister of Employment and Social Security (2011–2019) ===
Báñez with U.S. Secretary of Labor Thomas Perez in Washington, D.C., 4 June 2015

After the 2011 general election, on 21 December 2011 it was announced that newly elected prime minister Mariano Rajoy appointed her Minister of Employment and Social Security, replacing Valeriano Gómez. She was sworn in on 22 December 2011 as the first woman to hold this office. As minister, Báñez had to grapple with a high unemployment rate, which according to the Spanish Center for Sociological Research at that time, was a serious problem in the country. The unemployment rate was 22.85%, double the average EU rate, with the youth unemployment rate closer to 50%. In addition, 1.2 million jobs had been lost since the fourth quarter of 2007 and the percentage of the work force regarded as temporary workers was at 25%, one of the highest in the EU.

Báñez (third from left) in a cabinet meeting, 9 March 2018

On 10 February 2012, she launched the first labour reform of the People's Party government. This measure gained the support of the European Commission, the Bank of Spain and the OCDE, but it could not get the approval of the trade unions. Although Báñez was open to dialogue, she confirmed that the basic lines of the reform would remain unchanged. The most criticised point was that of making dismissal less costly, because the compensation for unfair dismissal for indefinite duration contracts was reduced from 45 to 33 days per year worked, while the compensation in the case of objective dismissals, was set at 20 days per year worked. Redundancy compensation for workers in Spain was traditionally the highest in Europe. The mobilizations against labor reform culminated on 29 March 2012, with the first general strike during the whole period of the governance of Mariano Rajoy.

On 24 January 2013, thirteen months into her post of Minister of Employment and Social Security, the unemployment rate in Spain was 26.02%, higher than when she originally entered office Her reforms were later credited with helping reduce unemployment, which stood at 18.9% in 2016, although still the second-highest rate in the European Union after Greece at the time.

In September 2013, Báñez announced pension reforms aimed primarily at decoupling pension increases from the CPI from 2014 onwards. In 2016, she served as acting Minister of Health, replacing Alfonso Alonso who had resigned.

Báñez was re-appointed after the 2016 general election in November 2016. She was sworn in on 4 November 2016. During the imposition of direct rule resulting from the Catalan Parliament’s unilateral declaration of independence on 27 October 2017, Báñez took charge of the Catalan Ministry of Labour, Social Affairs and Families, and assumed direct control of the Catalan Public Employment Service, the Directorate-General for Labour Inspection and the Labour Relations Council. In December 2017, she agreed with the trade unions and employers’ organisations to raise the minimum wage from €707 to €850.

When a vote of no-confidence against Mariano Rajoy ousted his government, Báñez's term ended on 1 June 2018 and Magdalena Valerio succeeded her as minister on 7 June 2018.

=== Later years ===
Báñez at the Meridiana Awards ceremony, 25 March 2025

Following the PP primaries, which were won by Pablo Casado, Báñez announced that she was leaving politics in March 2019 to pursue a career in the private sector and that she would not be standing as a candidate in that year's elections. In December 2019, she became chair of the Confederación Española de Organizaciones Empresariales Foundation and external councillor of the pharmaceutical company Laboratorios Rovi, a position to which she was re-elected in 2024.

After 2025, she was member of Iberdrola Energía Internacional, a subsidiary of Iberdrola, and was also a member of the board of directors of the meat processing company Incarlopsa. The day before her death, Báñez took part in the conference organised by the Federation of Metal and Related Industries of Asturias in Gijón.

== Personal life and death ==
Báñez was married to banking executive Jaime Alonso and had two sons; she kept her family life out of the public eye. She was a fan of bullfighting, badminton and poetry, admirer of the singer-songwriter Joaquín Sabina, and devout follower of the Virgin of El Rocío.

On 28 October 2026, Báñez was reported missing in a high-speed train collision in Urda, Toledo, Spain, while traveling from Madrid to Seville on behalf of the CEOE Foundation for an event with business leaders. She was seated in the rear car of the Iryo train, which ultimately bore the brunt of the impact. Her death was confirmed by her party the following day. The funeral took place at the parish church of San Juan Bautista in San Juan del Puerto on 30 October 2026.

== Honors ==
- Grand Cross of the Order of Charles III (2018)

Political offices
Preceded by Valeriano Gómez	Minister of Employment and Social Security; 2011–2018	Succeeded by Magdalena Valerio
