= Jaume Aiguader =

Spanish doctor and politician

Jaime Aiguader Miró

Mayor of Barcelona
- In office 1931–1934
- Preceded by: Juan Antonio Güell López
- Succeeded by: Carlos Pi Suñer

Minister of Labor and Social Assistance
- In office 17 May 1937 – 16 August 1938
- Preceded by: Anastasio de Gracia Villarrubia (Labor); Federica Montseny Mañé (Health and Social Assistance)
- Succeeded by: Jose Moix Regás

Personal details
- Born: 24 July 1882 Reus, Baix Camp, Tarragona, Catalonia, Spain.
- Died: 30 May 1943 (aged 60) Mexico City, Mexico
- Occupation: Doctor, writer, politician

Jaume Aiguader i Miró (Note: The family name was Aguadé, and this is used in all official documents, but in later years Jaume preferred to use the form "Aiguader".) (or Jaime Aguadé Miró, 24 July 1882 – 30 May 1943) was a Spanish medical doctor, writer, social activist, politician and Catalan nationalist. He was one of the founders of the Republican Left of Catalonia political party. He became Mayor of Barcelona, and was a national deputy during the Second Spanish Republic. He was Minister of Labor and Social Assistance in the government of Juan Negrín during the Spanish Civil War (1936–1939). After the fall of the Republic, he died in exile in Mexico.

== Life ==
=== Early years (1882–1923) ===
Jaime Aiguader Miró was born in Reus, Tarragona, Spain on 24 July 1882, son of Jaime Aiguadé Serra and Rosa Miró Castells. His father owned a transport company, and the family was prosperous. He studied in Reus, and showed a lively interest in current affairs. He joined a group of young people, many with anarchist leanings, that included Juan Puig Ferreter. Aiguader did not want to join the family business, and around 1900 moved to Barcelona to study medicine. He wrote in Spanish for the anarchist periodical La Alarma, and in Catalan for the magazine Germinal, both published in Reus. He ran a medical consultation in Barcelona in a working-class district, and sometimes waived his fees. He graduated in 1907 and moved to Madrid for his doctoral studies, obtaining a degree as a doctor in 1909.

In 1912 Aiguader published a book on Social Aspects of Social Infections in Marriage. That year he married Carmen Cortés Lladó, from a family of doctors. They would have four children: Jaime Antón, Carmen, Nuria and Cristian. Aiguader lived in Reus from 1912 to 1914. He moved to Barcelona and continued to practice medicine. In 1919 he was one of the founders of the Catalonia doctor's union. In 1921 he gained a position on the Municipal Medical Corps of Barcelona. From 1921 to 1925 he chaired the Ateneo Enciclopédico Popular, a cultural organization.

=== Dictatorship (1923–1933) ===
Aiguader held left-wing and Catalan nationalist political views. In 1923 he joined the Unión Socialista de Cataluña (USC, Socialist Union of Catalonia). The USC declined after 1923 during the dictatorship of Miguel Primo de Rivera. Aiguader became involved with the Estat Català founded by Francesc Macià, while retaining his USC membership. Due to his opposition to the regime his house was searched and he was arrested several times. He was held in the Modelo prison from November 1926 to May 1927. During and after the dictatorship he published many works on scientific and social subjects in Catalan.

As a leader of the Estat Català a l'interior Aiguader travelled to Brussels several times to meet with Maciá. In 1929 he was more active in illegal politics, and to 1930 he participated in the Pact of San Sebastián. In March 1931 Aiguader was a founder and director of the Izquierda Republicana de Cataluña (Republican Left of Catalonia). He was among the candidates of the Esquerra who won the municipal elections of 12 April 1931. He promised radical change. At one election meeting in April he said the changes being implemented in the Soviet Union were just an "anticipation" of the plans of the Esquerra.

Aiguader joined Maciá and other leaders in proclaiming the Catalan Republic within the Iberian Federation on 14 April 1931, and was proclaimed mayor of Barcelona. The Barcelona city government struggled due to large debts, shortage of resources and lack of management skills. It did manage to improve tax collection and greatly increase the number of children in the new municipal schools. Aiguader was elected to the provisional government council representing Barcelona in May 1931. He was elected to the national government as a deputy for Barcelona in the election of 28 June 1931. His position as a director of the Esquerra was confirmed in the first general congress of the party in February 1932.

=== Second Spanish Republic (1933–1939) ===
At the second Esquerra party congress in June 1933, after the end of the dictatorship, Aiguader represented the Federation of Tarragona. In June 1933 he and other members of the Esquerra resigned and were restored to their positions by the new government. He held office until 31 July 1934. He was elected to represent Barcelona in the national government in the general elections of 19 November 1933. After the disturbances of 6 October 1934 (Note: Tension between the right-wing government in Madrid and the government of Catalonia built up to a rebellion on 6 October 1934. The Catalan government was imprisoned and home rule was suspended.) he was arrested, as were other members of the government, and imprisoned on the ship Argentina, anchored in the port of Barcelona. His journal Pamphlet was suspended. Despite being a deputy, he was held until May 1935, when he was released on parole. He resumed publication of Pamphlet in February 1936.

Aiguader was again elected to represent Barcelona in the national parliament in the general election of 16 February 1936. When the Spanish Civil War began in July 1936 he organized and ran the Health Committee of the Antifascist Militias, created the first hospital in the Barcelona war zone, and was a member of the Health Council of War. In the first government of Francisco Largo Caballero from September to November 1936 he was undersecretary for Health and Welfare within the Ministry of Labor, Health and Social Welfare, headed by Josep Tomàs i Piera. He was a minister without portfolio representing the Esquerra in Largo Caballero's second government from 4 November 1936 to 17 May 1937, based in Valencia. From 17 May 1937 to 16 August 1938 he was Minister of Labor and Social Welfare in the government of Juan Negrín. He resigned in August 1938 in solidarity with the Basque Manuel de Irujo because he thought some of the government's decisions on war industries harmed the rights of Catalonia, and because he disagreed with the creation of special war tribunals.

=== Later years ===
After the fall of Catalonia at the start of 1939 Aiguader went into exile in France. He worked with organizations that assisted refugees in Paris. While in Paris he contributed to El Poble Català and the Revista de Catalunya. After the occupation of France in June 1940 by the German forces, he lived in concealment in various French cities until he was able to escape to Mexico in 1941. In Mexico he continued to contribute to El Poble Català, edited the Revista de Catalunya, Pamphlet and Butlletí del Sindicat de Metges de Catalunya, and contributed to other publications. He wrote a biography of Miquel Servet, which was published in 1945, after his death. Aiguader died in Mexico City on 30 May 1943.

Jaime's younger brother Artemio Aiguader also became a politician, and during the Civil War was interior cpuncelor of the Generalidad of Catalonia.

== Publications ==
Aiguader helped with the creation of the Arnau de Vilanova publishing house, and founded and directed the Monografies mèdiques journal from 1926 to 1937. This monthly journal covered medical and scientific subjects in technical terms in the Catalan language, including articles by Aiguader. Although Aiguader often spoke about popularizing medicine, and said he wanted Monografies to reach the general public, the articles and advertisements were clearly addressed to medical professionals. Aiguader planned a Catalan-language scientific encyclopedia for workers and arts and crafts students, but also for the "educated man". He also published the La Sageta series of books for a broader audience, also in Catalan. These Catalan publications may be seen as vehicles for opposition to the dictatorship.

Unlike authors who romanticized Barcelona's Barrio Chino red light district, Aiguader wrote, "There's nothing but dirt and poverty there. Much of the vice and crime are nothing but overdue meals and lack of water to wash oneself. A few rolls of bread carefully distributed and a lot of soap would clean up all that grime." He gave many lectures to workers, and wrote articles on social issues in newspapers such as the Butlletí del Sindicat de Metges de Catalunya, La Publicidad (under the pseudonym "Jordi Amer"), La Nau, Ideari, Justícia Social, L'Opinió, Mirador and the Revista de Catalunya. In 1929 he published La Lleialtat a l'època, in which he analyzed the condition of industrial workers. In 1931 he helped Lluís Companys found the newspaper La Humanitat. Aiguader's publications include:

- Jaume Aiguader i Miró (1912). Aspecte social de les infeccions sexuals en el matrimoni (in Catalan) (1 ed.). Barcelona.
- Jaume Aiguader i Miró (1922). Nova tasca de l'Ateneu: curs 1921-1922 (in Catalan) (1 ed.). Barcelona: Ateneu Enciclopèdic Popular.
- Joan Puig i Ferreter; Jaume Aiguader i Miró (prolog) (1928). Vida interior d'un escriptor. La Sageta (in Catalan) (1 ed.). Barcelona: Arnau de Vilanova.
- Jaume Aiguader i Miró (1929). La Fatiga obrera: conferència donada pel Dr. J. Aiguader i Miró en l'Associació Obrera de la Indústria Fabril i Tèxtil de Barcelona i el seu radi, i en la Societat Esbarjo Ateneu de Mataró (in Catalan) (1 ed.). Barcelona.
- Jaume Aiguader i Miró (1929). La Lleialtat a l'època. La Sageta (in Catalan) (1 ed.). Barcelona: Arnau de Vilanova.
- Jaume Aiguader i Miró (1930). Amb Catalunya i per Catalunya. La Sageta (in Catalan) (1 ed.). Barcelona: Arnau de Vilanova.
- Jaume Aiguader i Miró (1931). Catalunya i la revolució. La Sageta (in Catalan) (1 ed.). Barcelona: Arnau de Vilanova.
  - Jaume Aiguader i Miró (1932). Cataluña y la revolución: temas políticos (in Spanish). Madrid: Zeus.
- Jaume Aiguader i Miró (1932). El Problema de l'habitació obrera a Barcelona (in Catalan) (1 ed.). Barcelona: Publicacions de l'Institut Municipal d'Higiene.
- Jaume Aiguader i Miró (1932). Elogi de Barcelona (in Catalan) (1 ed.). Barcelona: Ajuntament.
- Jaume Aiguader i Miró (1932). Elogi dels metges i de la Medicina (in Catalan) (1 ed.). Barcelona, Arnau de Vilanova: Miquel Servet.
- Jaume Aiguader i Miró (1935). Figures i moments de la Medicina. Monografies Mèdiques (in Catalan). year of publication approximate (1 ed.). Barcelona: Arnau de Vilanova.
- Jaume Aiguader i Miró (1935). Les estadístiques de la mortalitat espanyola, catalana i barcelonina. Monografies Mèdiques (in Catalan) (1 ed.). Barcelona: Arnau de Vilanova.
- Jaume Aiguader i Miró; Jaume Pi-Sunyer (preface) (1945). Miquel Servet (in Catalan). Posthumous edition. Second edition in 1981 (1 ed.). Mexico.

== Sources ==
- "AGUADE MIRO, JAIME" (in Spanish). Congress of Deputies.
- Goodway, David (2013-06-26) [1989]. For Anarchism. Routledge. ISBN 978-1-135-03756-7.
- "Jaume Aiguader i Miró". Gran Enciclopèdia Catalana.
- "Jaume Aiguader i Miró" (PDF). Memòria Esquerra (in Catalan). JPM. Fundació Josep Irla. 2015. Archived from the original (PDF) on 2015-09-28.
- "Jaume Aiguader i Miró Obra pròpia". Memòria Esquerra (in Catalan). Fundació Josep Irla. 2015.
- Papanelopoulou, Faidra; Nieto-Galan, Agustí; Perdiguero, Enrique (2009). Popularizing Science and Technology in the European Periphery, 1800-2000. Ashgate Publishing, Ltd. ISBN 978-0-7546-6269-3.
- Parés i Maicas, Manuel (1985). Approach to Catalonia. Univ. Autònoma de Barcelona. ISBN 978-84-7488-135-6.
- Resina, Joan Ramon (2008). Barcelona's Vocation of Modernity: Rise and Decline of an Urban Image. Stanford University Press. ISBN 978-0-8047-5832-1.
- Romero Salvadó, Francisco J. (2013). Historical Dictionary of the Spanish Civil War. Rowman & Littlefield. ISBN 978-0-8108-5784-1.
- Urquijo y Goitia, José Ramón de (2008). Gobiernos y ministros españoles en la edad contemporánea. Editorial CSIC - CSIC Press. ISBN 978-84-00-08737-1.
