= Chucho el Roto (film) =

1960 film

- Directed by: Manuel Muñoz
- Written by: Alfredo Ruanova; Carlos Enrique Taboada
- Produced by: Víctor Parra
- Starring: Carlos Baena; Adriana Roel; Óscar Pulido
- Cinematography: Fernando Colín
- Edited by: Jorge Busto
- Production company: Estudios América
- Release date: 4 August 1960
- Running time: 87 minutes
- Country: Mexico
- Language: Spanish

Chucho el Roto is a 1960 Mexican historical adventure film directed by Manuel Muñoz and starring Carlos Baena, Adriana Roel and Óscar Pulido. It portrays the life of the nineteenth century bandit Chucho el Roto.

== Cast ==
- Carlos Baena as Chucho el Roto
- Adriana Roel
- Óscar Pulido
- Arturo Martinez
- Miguel Arenas
- Tito Novaro
- Fanny Schiller
- Norma Angélica
- Carlos Ancira
- Emma Roldán
- Francisco Reiguera

== Bibliography ==
- Emilio García Riera. Historia documental del cine mexicano: 1959-1960. Universidad de Guadalajara, 1994.
