= Jesús Arriaga =

Mexican bandit (1858–1885)

Jesús Arriaga Zamora, (Note: In this Spanish name, the first or paternal surname is Arriaga and the second or maternal family name is Zamora. The maternal surname is given by TV Azteca Veracruz and other sources.) better known as Chucho el Roto (1858–1885), was a Mexican bandit active in the late 19th century, whose life story has been the basis of number of books, plays and other media since before his death. His real name was Jesús Arriaga; the nickname Chucho (literally "mutt") is a common diminutive of Jesús in Spanish, and roto (literally, "broken") can be translated as "discarded" or "ragged".

Arriaga was born in the state of Tlaxcala in 1858. After being forced to abandon his family, Chucho became a bandit, becoming famous in the late 1870s and the first half of the 1880s. His fame came from his ability to cross Mexico's strong socioeconomic circles and use this ability to rob from the wealthy. His legend also includes the love of fine clothes and the theater despite his humble birth and the sharing of at least some of his gains with the poor. The last aspect has prompted comparisons between him and Robin Hood. Chucho was last arrested in 1884 and died in the prison of San Juan de Ulúa in Veracruz in 1885.

Arriaga's fame and legend began with newspaper accounts of him from the time, with the first fictional story based on him appearing three months before his death. Early works did not give a uniform significance to the legend, but during the epoch of Porfirio Díaz and the Mexican Revolution, his modern persona emerged. His story continues to be told in films, television, novels and other media.

== Early life ==
Arriaga was born in the village of Santa Ana Chiautempan, Tlaxcala, in 1858. He was a good student, but after the death of his father, he was obliged to quit school to work to support his mother and sister. Eventually he lived in Mexico City, where he was hired to do some carpentry work at the house of a wealthy family. Here met and fell in love with one of the young women there named Matilde. She was an orphan living with aunt and uncle at the house. He got her pregnant but never married her since he was poor. The family left to hide the pregnancy, stating that they would go on vacation to Europe. They returned two years later with a little girl named Dolores who they claimed they adopted in France. Chucho kidnapped the girl and took her to his sister’s house. However, the police went after him, and he was forced to abandon his family.

== Career ==
The beginning of Chucho’s career is unknown but from the 1870s to his death in 1885, he became an urban bandit whose escapades with the law triggered intense reactions from both lower and privileged classes. He was dedicated to robbing jewelry stores, pawnshops and homes of the wealthy and reputed to be a seducer of rich, lonely women, with a gift for small talk and friendliness. He is distinguished from most other bandits at the time for his ability to cross socioeconomic lines. A middle class carpenter by birth, he found ways to integrate himself into upper social circles, often using these contacts to carry out his crimes. He was also mobile and active along the railroad lines connecting the cities of Veracruz, Puebla, Mexico City and Querétaro, which were the epitome of modernization as well as law and order at the time.

Much of his fame and legend status has its origins in the newspaper accounts of him in the late 1870s and early 1880s. These stories often embellished his abilities and bravery. They also included episodes where he shared his gains with the poor, earning him comparisons with Robin Hood. The federal authorities, however, portrayed Chucho as a danger to peace in the country.

His nickname has a basis in this legend. “Chucho” is a common nickname for his given name “Jesús.” “El Roto” refers to his ability and tendency to dress in fine clothes, with “roto” referring to a well-dressed person, especially someone from the lower classes in fine clothing. In later literary works about him, this would be interpreted in various ways, either as his insulting the lower classes from which he came or as symbolize of his basic honor. Others acknowledge that he may have done so to avoid mistreatment prevalent against the poor of the time.

However, Chucho did not always dress in fine clothes. During one arrest, he was in working class clothing but in possession of “elegant suits and fine gloves” which was reported to function as a disguise. His ability to “disguise” himself was not limited to clothing as newspapers reported that he carried himself as an educated and non-vulgar person. This was also accompanied by the assertion that Chucho did not use violence in his crimes and even “vowed not to kill.”

It is not known for certain if Chucho had accomplices. He never admitted to having them and denied to authorities that anyone in his company even knew that he was a “famous bandit.” However, there are newspaper accounts mentioning accomplices such as Francisco Varela and several women who arrested along with him in Querétaro.

Chucho had been arrested several times during his career. The first time was in a cabin near Texcoco, State of Mexico, and was taken to Belén Prison in Mexico City. By 1873, he would have escaped from this same prison three times, with little fanfare.

By 1881, Chucho el Roto was a recognized and popular bandit. On August 17 of this year Joaquín Mendizábal, chief of police of the state of Veracruz arrested him in Orizaba, where he was working as a carpenter under an assumed name. He was suspected of planning a robbery of a cigarette factory and had goods hidden somewhere in the city of Puebla. Reports indicate accomplices as well as weapons and other goods possibly linking him to unsolved crimes in the area. Later reports indicate that Chucho feared for his life from rural authorities, who were known for a tradition called the “ley fuga.” This entailed freeing a prisoner only to shoot them for “escaping.” He supposedly paid for a private guard to accompany him and Veracruz authorities as they transferred him back to Belén Prison in Mexico City. Also, reports at the time have Chucho claiming sixty non-violent robberies to date.

His fame brought him admirers and supporters from various parts of society. Signs demanding Chucho’s release or Mendizábel’s death appeared in Orizaba. Chucho’s defenses of his actions to authorities appealing to sections of the penal code impressed some, including a Mexico City governor named Ramón Fernández. After being transferred to the Belen Prison in 1881, Chucho escaped again and went to Querétaro.

== Final arrest and death ==
In May 1884, Chucho was posing as a coffee seller in the city of Querétaro. According to the arrest report, he had rented two houses in Querétaro, where he was living under the alias José Vega with his companion of six years, María Bermeo, and he helped support a daughter named Delfina living in Mexico City. While prior arrest and other reports are inconsistent as to his appearance, his arrest report in 1884 has him at forty nine or fifty years old with a medium height of one meter, seventy centimeters. It describes him as dark skinned (moreno) but given his ability to integrate into higher social circles, this is doubtful.

Chucho had supposedly been living in Querétaro for some time but few knew anything about him. After the arrest, he was described by neighbors as someone who went to the theatre, met people at the train station and walked about in public with “unheard of impertinence.” This is one of the reasons he became suspect. He had also befriended the owner of a jewelry shop, but he did not have reference as to his identity of “José Vega” or his business.

Chucho was arrested by Querétaro police chief Rómulo Alonso after arriving home from a performance at the Iturbide Theater. His wife María Bermeo and a suspected accomplice were arrested at the same time. Four other women were arrested as accomplices later. All were charged with robbing a local store after police found cash, goods and tools such as master keys, drills and rope in one of Chucho’s residences. Further investigation revealed his real identity.

Soon after the arrest, Chucho was sent back to Belén Prison in Mexico City, but his wife and confiscated belongings remained in Querétaro. It was rumored that she was tortured in order to confess but that was never proven. Because of his previous escapes from Belen, it was decided to transfer Chucho to the San Juan de Ulúa fortress/prison in the port of Veracruz. In 1885, Chucho el Roto died at his prison but the cause of his death has been disputed. One story states that he died fighting with other prisoners. Another states that he was badly wounded in the leg trying to escape from this prison. After the escape he was tortured. The story goes on to say that after hearing about this, Chucho’s sister came to visit him in the prison. After asking for her forgiveness, he died. San Juan de Ulúa Prison had a reputation of being so bad that once a prisoner entered, he never left. This was mostly due to filthy conditions leading to death by disease. The Monitor Republicano newspaper reported Chucho’s death in 1885, but demanded an inquiry to determine if he was beaten to death. The same paper briefly confirmed that dysentery was the cause of death one week later.

His body was transferred to the docks in Veracruz but no one knows where he was buried. One story states that he was buried in Mexico City in an old cemetery which is now an ecological park.

== Legacy ==
Chucho el Roto's fame and legacy began with newspaper accounts about him. Many of these depictions distinguish Chucho from the common classes, as an aficionado of the theater and novels and as a good candidate to become a priest or congressman (El Correo de Lunes, 1884). Others focused on Chucho's morality, especially the nonviolent nature of his crimes.

The first literary work based on him was published three months before his death. This play was called Diego Corrientes or El bandido generoso ("The Generous Bandit"). Other bandit figures who would follow him during the Porfirio Díaz period included Heraclio Bernal (late 1880s) and Santonón (1910s). These and other early works about him did not give the legend a uniform cultural significance. An early play about him in 1889 has Chucho finally rejecting the criminal life due to his inherent moral superiority. This work, called Chucho el Roto, o La nobleza de un bandido ("Chucho el Roto or The nobility of a bandit") by Juan C. Maya, emphasizes the status quo of the time and depicts his crimes as brutish rather than non-violent.

Chucho's modern image developed during the presidency of Porfirio Díaz and the years of the Mexican Revolution. One of the first works to portray banditry as a result of marginalized individuals forced into a life of crime was Manuel Payno's Los bandidos de Río Frío (1889-1991). These and later works would focus on the social inequalities using Chucho as an antihero, who is basically honorable, while those in the privileged classes inflict or are complicit in injustices. More militant and socialist versions of the story just after the Mexican Revolution have Chucho as a kind of combatant against the proletariat. These include two anonymously authored novels called Chucho el Roto, o La Nobleza de un bandido mexicano in 1916 and La verdadera y única historia de Chucho el Roto: Compilada según las memorias de su consejero y secretario Enrique Villena from 1922-1923.

Continued depiction of Chucho el Roto as a Robin Hood like figure continued well into the 20th century in films, novels, radio shows, tourist attractions and even restaurants bearing his name. Some of these include La vida de Chucho el Roto, Chucho el Roto, and even the television series El Tesoro de Chucho el Roto. The figure has evolved as a literate and skilled carpenter who lived, worked and stole in the social sphere of Mexico's high society. This figure fuses the romantic rural bandit with urban criminality and urban working classes. Investigations into Mexican banditry have repeatedly invoked Chucho's public image to debate the impact of banditry in late-nineteenth century Mexico. Studies in the last 20th century, revolve around whether famous bandits such as Chucho serve as a political or cultural model for popular dissent especially since stories about them continue to be popular.

=== Works inspired by Chucho's story ===
- Chucho el Roto (1934 film), directed by Gabriel Soria
- Chucho el roto (TV series), a 1968 Mexican telenovela
- Chucho el Roto (film), a 1960 film
