= Luis Armiñán Pérez =

Spanish politician

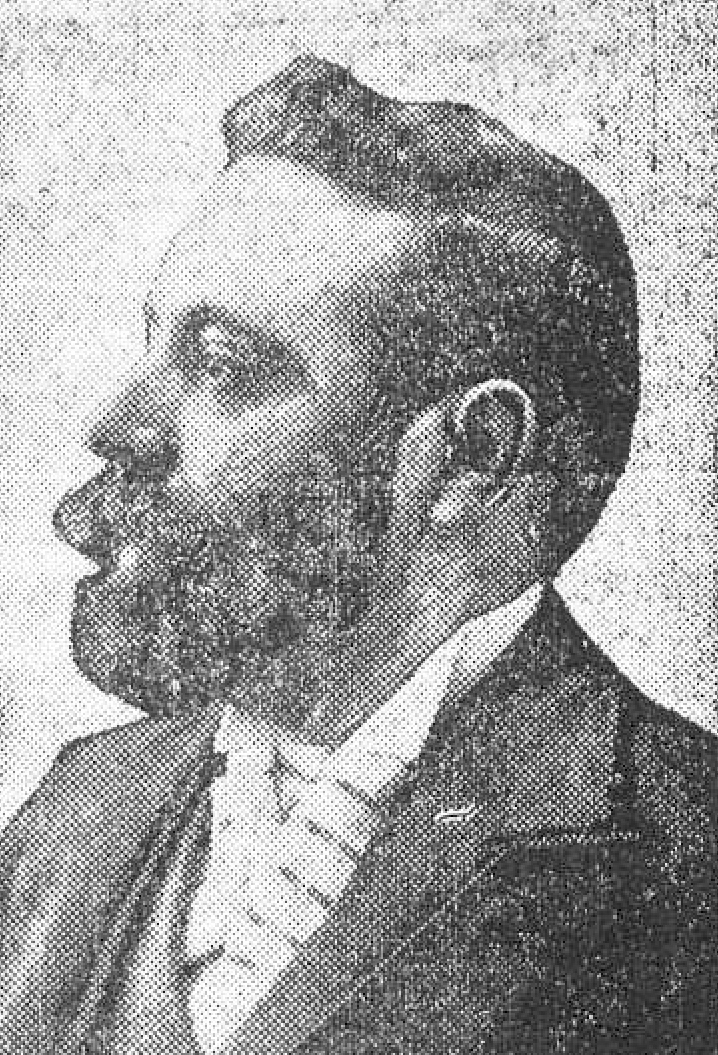
Portrait of Luis Armiñán

Luis Armiñan Pérez (July 14, 1871, in Sancti Spíritus, Cuba – October 2, 1949 in Madrid) was a Spanish politician and minister of labor and immigration during the reign of Alfonso XIII.

He served as a deputy in the Spanish Congress, representing the province of Lleida in the legislatures of 1901 and 1905, and represented the province of Málaga in the legislatures of 1910 and 1923. He was Minister of Labor and Immigration from September 3 and September 15, 1923, in a cabinet presided over by Manuel García Prieto.
