= Magdalena Valerio =

Spanish legal expert and politician

The Most Excellent Magdalena Valerio MP
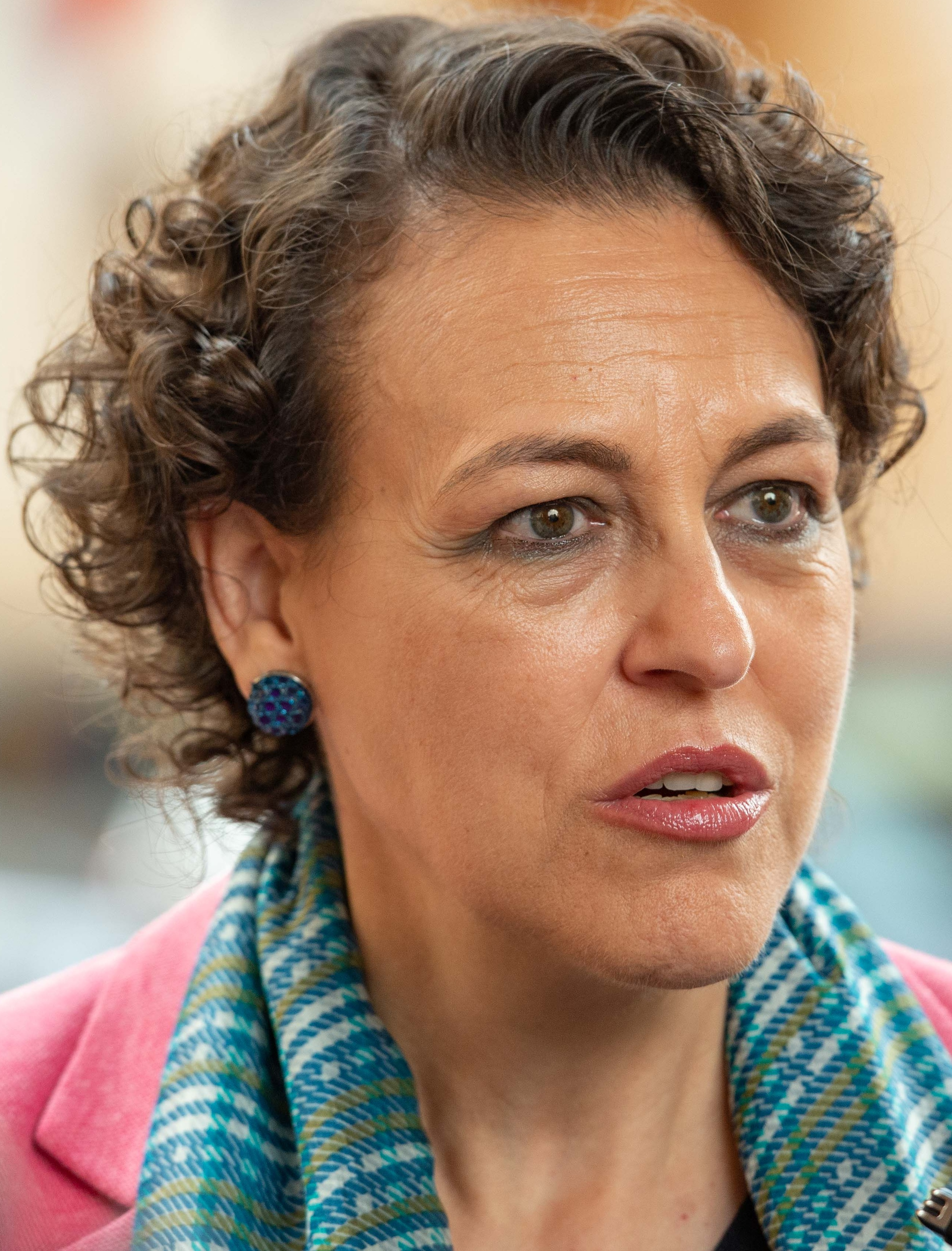

73rd President of the Council of State
- In office 1 November 2022 – 28 February 2024
- Monarch: Felipe VI
- Preceded by: María Teresa Fernández de la Vega
- Succeeded by: Carmen Calvo

Minister of Labour, Migration and Social Security of Spain
- In office 7 June 2018 – 13 January 2020
- Monarch: Felipe VI
- Prime Minister: Pedro Sánchez
- Preceded by: Fátima Báñez (Employment and Social Security)
- Succeeded by: Yolanda Díaz (Labour and Social Economy); José Luis Escrivá (Inclusion, Social Security and Migration)

Member of the Congress of Deputies
- In office 21 May 2019 – 18 October 2022
- Constituency: Guadalajara
- In office 13 December 2011 – 13 January 2016
- Constituency: Guadalajara

Member of Cortes of Castilla–La Mancha
- In office 19 June 2007 – 27 May 2010
- Constituency: Guadalajara

City Councilor of Guadalajara
- In office 11 June 2011 – 13 June 2015
- In office 4 July 1999 – 21 September 2005

Personal details
- Born: Magdalena Valerio Cordero; September 27, 1959 (age 67) Torremocha, Spain
- Party: Spanish Socialist Worker's Party
- Education: Complutense University of Madrid
- Occupation: Jurist and politician

Magdalena Valerio Cordero (born 27 September 1959), is a Spanish legal expert and politician, of the PSOE, that has spent most of her political career in the autonomous community of Castilla-La Mancha. She currently serves as president of the Council of State since 2022. Previously, she was Minister of Labour, Migrations and Social Security of the Government of Spain between 2018 and 2020, when she was succeeded by Yolanda Díaz and José Luis Escrivá.

== Biography ==
=== Origins and career ===
Born in Torremocha, province of Cáceres, on 27 September 1959, she studied law at the Complutense University of Madrid, graduating there in 1985. She has been a resident of Guadalajara since 1989. She worked as an exam coach and Area coordinator of Labour and Social Security in the Centro de Estudios Velázquez-ADAMS between 1986 and 1990. She is an officer of the Social Security Management Body and the Employment Management Scale of the INEM (National Employment Sistem). She also worked as head of the Bureau of Personnel in the Provincial Directorate of the INSERSO (Old Age and Social Services Institute) of Guadalajara between 1991 and 1994 and later as Deputy Director of Economic-Administrative Management and provincial secretary of the INSALUD of Guadalajara between 1994 and 1999.

=== Political career ===
In the 1999 local elections she was elected councillor in the Guadalajara City Council, and was re-elected in 2003 when she was appointed second deputy mayor and councillor for Economy, Finance, Procurement, Heritage and Citizen Participation. In September 2005 she was appointed Minister of Labor and Employment of Castilla-La Mancha and, in 2007, Minister of Tourism and Handicrafts. In September 2008 she became the regional Minister for Public Administration and Justice. In the regional elections of 2007 she headed the list of the PSOE for Guadalajara, winning a seat in the Regional Cortes.

In July 2008 she was elected a member of the Regional Executive Committee of the PSOE of CLM and in October of the same year was elected General Secretary of the Municipal Executive Committee of Guadalajara Capital. Also, from 2000 to 2012 she was a member of the Regional Committee of the PSOE of CLM. In May 2010 she stood down from the Government Council to be appointed a delegate to the Board of Communities of Castilla-La Mancha. That same year she won the primaries to be a PSOE candidate for the Guadalajara City Council. After the Socialist defeat in the elections of 2011, she went on to lead the opposition at City Hall.

Heading the PSOE ticket in Guadalajara in the general elections of 2011, she won a seat in Cortes Generales.

=== Minister of Labour, Migrations and Social Security ===
The new Spanish Prime Minister, Pedro Sánchez, following the motion of censure that the PSOE tabled against the previous government of Mariano Rajoy (PP) and that was carried on 1 June 2018, appointed her as Minister in the new Spanish government. Felipe VI sanctioned by royal decree her appointment as holder of the portfolio of Minister of Labour, Migrations and Social Security. On 7 June she was sworn into office before the King at Zarzuela Palace.

In February 2020 she was chosen by the Socialist group to chair the "Pacto de Toledo" Parliamentary Committee for Pension Reform.

Political offices
Preceded by María José López	Regional Minister of Labour and Employment of Castile-La Mancha; 2005–2007	Succeeded by María Luz Rodríguez Fernández
Preceded by Office created	Regional Minister of Tourism and Handicrafts of Castile-La Mancha; 2007–2008	Succeeded by Soledad Herrero
Preceded by Sonia Lozano Sabroso	Regional Minister of Public Administrations and Justice of Castile-La Mancha; 2008–2010	Succeeded by Santiago Moreno
Preceded by Fátima Báñez	Minister of Labour, Migrations and Social Security; 2018-2020	Succeeded by Yolanda Díaz; José Luis Escrivá
