= Comillas Pontifical University =

Private university in Madrid, Spain

Coordinates: 40°25′48″N 3°42′41″W

- Universidad Pontificia Comillas
- Seal
- Latin: Pontificia Universitas Comillensis Matriti
- Motto: El Valor de la Excelencia
- Motto in English: The Value of Excellence
- Type: Private Catholic Pontifical higher education institution
- Established: 1890; 136 years ago
- Religious affiliation: Roman Catholic Church (Jesuit)
- Chancellor: Very Rev.Arturo Sosa, SJ
- Vice-Chancellor: Rev.Joaquín Barrero Díaz, SJ
- Rector: Dr. P. Enrique Sanz Giménez-Rico, SJ
- Students: 11,149
- Location: Madrid, Spain
- Campus: Both urban and rural.
- Colors: Yellow & Black
- Website: www.comillas.edu
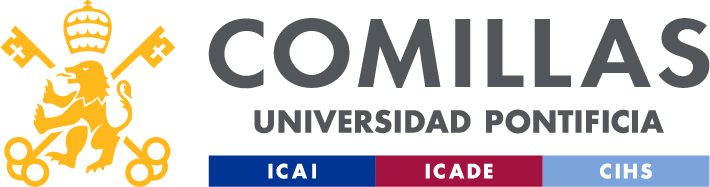

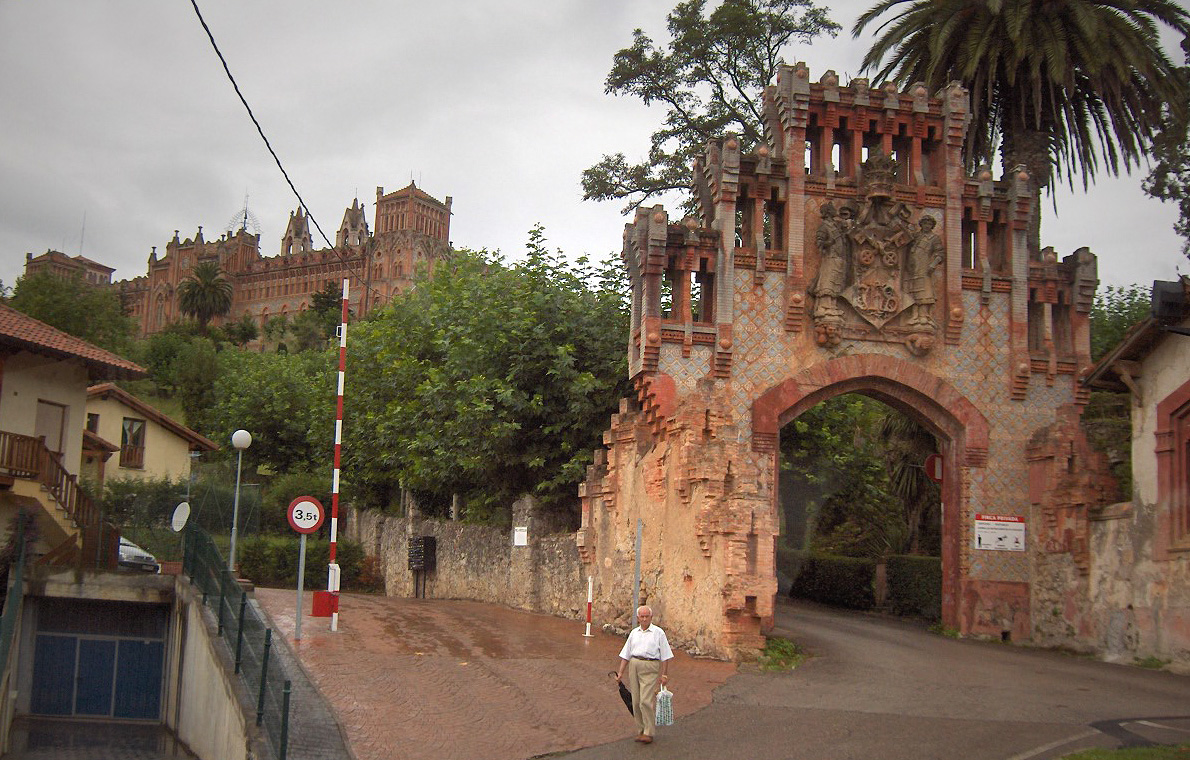
Entrance to the original complex in Comillas

Comillas Pontifical University (Spanish: Universidad Pontificia Comillas) is a private Catholic university run by the Spanish Province of the Society of Jesus in Madrid, Spain. The university is involved in a number of academic exchange programmes, work practice schemes and international projects with over 200 institutions of higher education in Europe, Latin America, North America and Asia.

== History ==
Pope Leo XIII founded the Seminary of St. Anthony of Padua in 1890 in the town of Comillas, (Province of Santander, currently Cantabria), in response to efforts made by the Marquess of Comillas to build an institution for educating local candidates to the priesthood. At the time of its foundation, the seminary was entrusted to the Society of Jesus. In 1904, the seminary was raised to the status of a Pontifical university when Pope Pius X granted the school the power to confer academic degrees in theology, philosophy and canon law.

In 1969 the university was moved to Madrid, where it admitted a wider range of students including international students.

In 1978 the Jesuits incorporated into the university their Madrid's higher education institution ICAI-ICADE, the resultant entity of the merger in 1960 of ICAI and ICADE, two institutes established in 1908 and 1956 respectively. They are today the ICAI School of Engineering, the ICADE School of Law and the ICADE School of Business and Economics.

Several other schools, like the San Juan de Dios School of Nursing, were incorporated later on, to reach the university's present structure of seven colleges and schools:

- Facultad de Teología (Divinity School)
- Facultad de Derecho Canónico (Canon Law School)
- Facultad de Ciencias Humanas y Sociales (Human & Social Sciences School)
- Escuela Técnica Superior de Ingeniería ICAI (ICAI School of Engineering)
- Facultad de Ciencias Económicas y Empresariales ICADE (ICADE School of Business & Economics)
- Facultad de Derecho ICADE (ICADE School of Law)
- Escuela Universitaria de Enfermería y Fisioterapia "San Juan de Dios" (Saint John of God's School of Nursing and Physiotherapy)

Study and research centres and institutes have been created (Institute for Research in Technology, Institute for Liberalism, Krausism and Freemasonry Research, Graduate Studies Institute, Institute for Educational Science, Institute for Migration Research, Faith and Secularism Institute, Law Innovation Center, Modern Language Institute, University Institute on the Family).

University rankings

Global – Overall
- QS World: 581 (2026)

== See also ==
- Antonio López y López
- List of Jesuit sites
- List of modern universities in Europe (1801–1945)
