= Errekaleor =

Squatted zone in Basque country

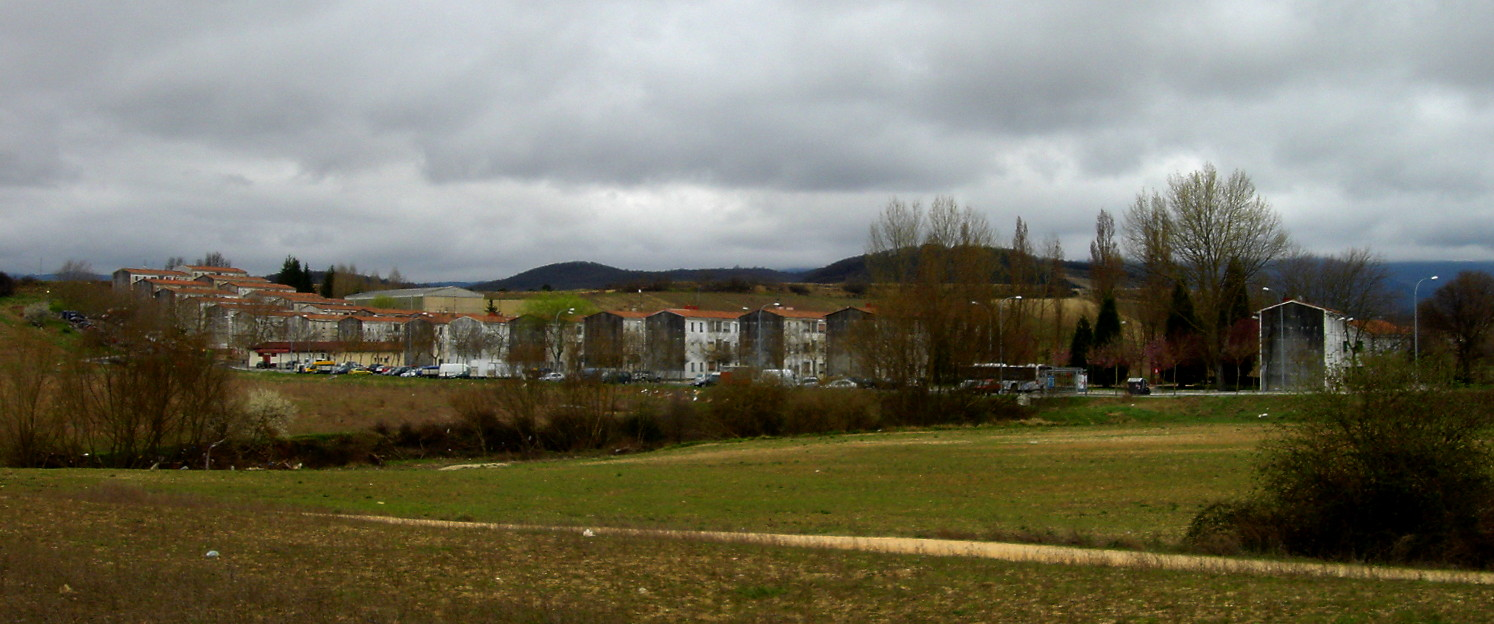
- Nickname: Errekaleor Bizirik
- Location within Spain Location within the Basque Country Location within Europe
- Coordinates: 42.83551°N 2.65127°W
- Established: built 1950s, squatted 2013

Area
  - Total: 10 ha (25 acres)

Population (2017)
  - Total: 150
  - Density: 1,500/km^{2} (3,900/sq mi)
- Website: errekaleorbizirik.org

Errekaleor is a neighbourhood on the periphery of Vitoria-Gasteiz, in the Basque Country, Spain. It sits on the plateau created by the Errekaleor river, which is part of the Green Belt of Vitoria-Gasteiz. From 2013 onwards, the area was occupied by squatters and became known as Errekaleor Bizirik (Errekaleor Alive). The project is based on the principles of workers' self-management (autogestión), consensus based decision making, feminism, anti-capitalism and Basque cultural re-invigoration. The neighbourhood is the largest occupied space of its type on the Iberian Peninsula, with over 10 hectares of land and 150 inhabitants. Residents include children, the elderly, blue-collar workers, the unemployed, students, and teachers. The project includes an organic farm of 2 hectares, a bakery, a bar, a social centre, a library, a theatre, a free shop, a recording studio, and other projects.

The area is made up of 32 blocks (Basque: 'bloke', Spanish: 'bloques') that hold six apartments each, as well as a number of buildings that were built as part of the original development, such as a school, church and shops, which have now been renovated by the Errekaleor Bizirik community. The neighbourhood has existed since the 1950s, but fell into disrepair and was largely abandoned after the Vitoria-Gasteiz city government evicted the original residents in order to develop the area with modern apartment complexes. Due to the European debt crisis, these plans were never carried out, and the area was almost entirely unused for years before the occupation began.

== Creation ==
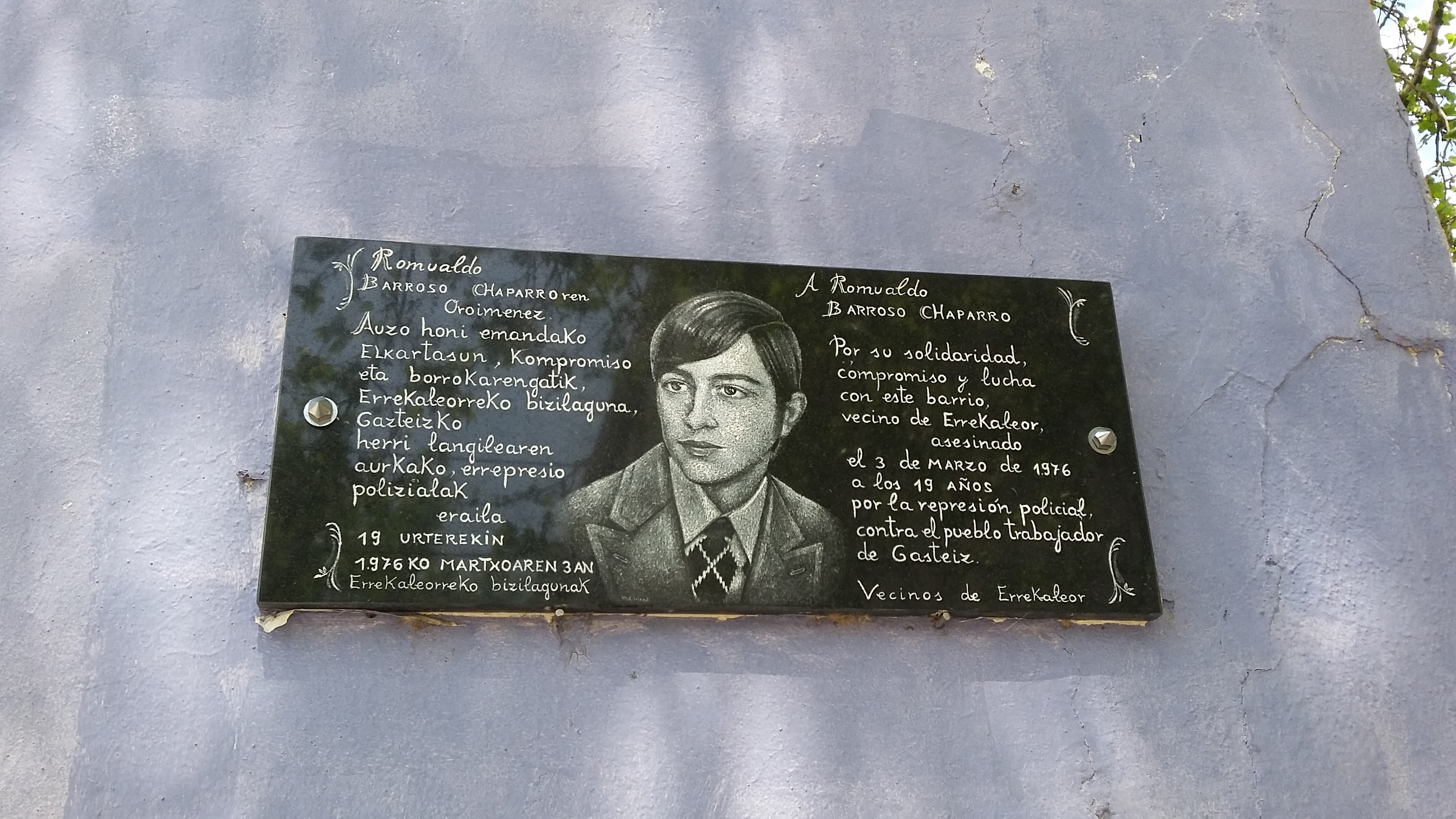
Plaque commemorating the victims of the police massacre of March 3rd, 1976.

In the 1950s, the neighbourhood was built in order to provide housing for the workers who were relocated in the city, having been moved from Andalucia, Castile and León and Extremadura due to an industrialization program in Francoist Spain. 1200 people lived in the neighbourhood. Many of its residents were involved in labour struggles after the transition to democracy which began in 1975. During a city-wide labour strike, Romualdo Barroso Chaparro, a 19 year old resident of Errekaleor, was one of five people killed in a police massacre in 1976, giving the neighbourhood a distinctly militant reputation.

== Redevelopment plans ==
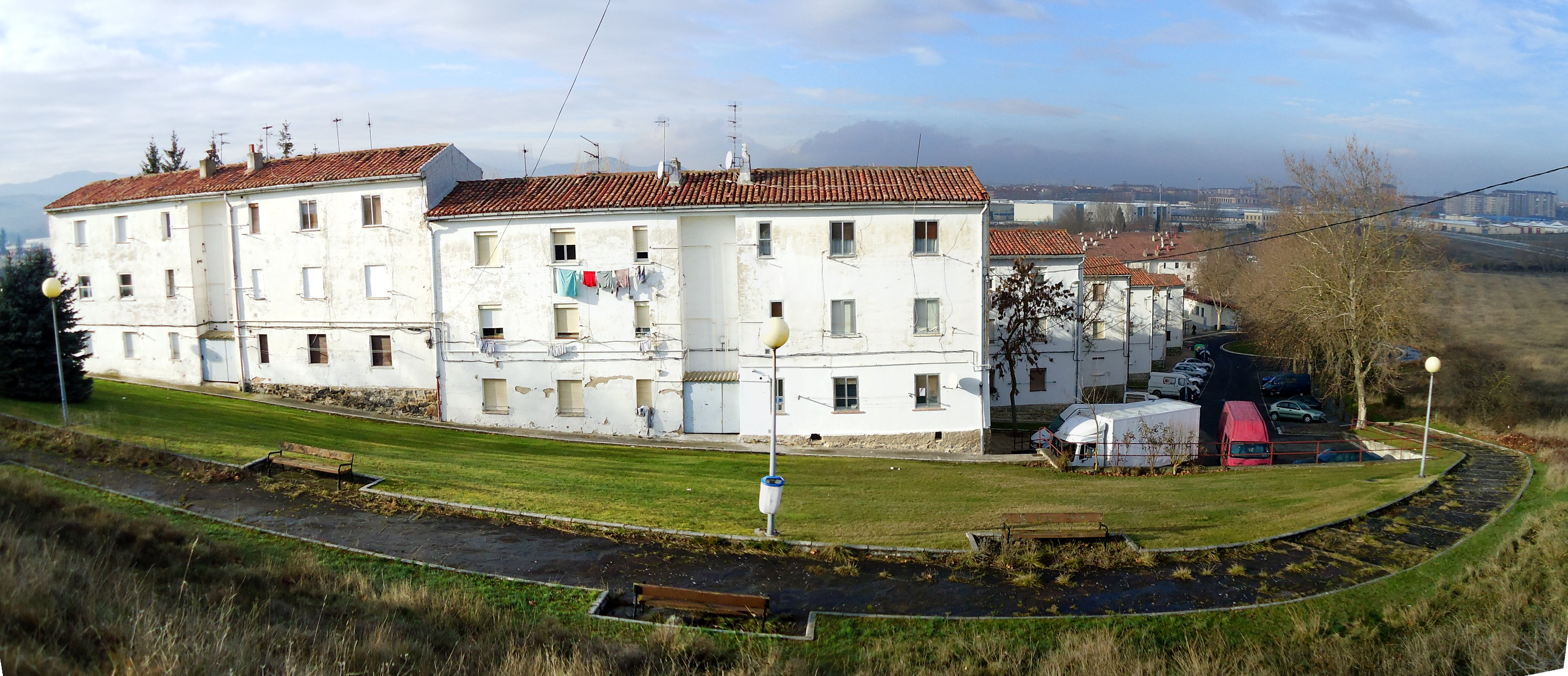
Two apartment blocks in Errekaleor in 2010, before the occupation of the neighbourhood.

As time went by and the city limit expanded to the edge of Errekaleor, this land increasingly became seen as a valuable resource by the city and developers. In the 1990s and early 2000s the Spanish housing boom led to increased development on the outskirts of the city as part of Vitoria's General Urban Planning Plan. This process created fifteen new sectors of development where entire neighbourhoods were built from scratch. One of these designated neighbourhoods was Errekaleor, and the city began to negotiate with the residents in order to buy their properties and redevelop. In 2002, the Vitoria-Gasteiz city council headed by the Popular Party officially decided to demolish the neighbourhood.

By 2010 the city had finalized their proposals, and used their power of expropriation against the few remaining residents of the neighbourhood in order to clear the way for the project. The new plan was for 1,511 new apartments in 4 buildings surrounding a park of 1.7 acres, designed by Ramón López de Ludo, VC Architects, and Antonio Vélez. During this period the neighbourhood residents resisted the process, mounting various legal challenges and repeatedly voting against their proposed relocation. However, by early 2010 there only remained 35 families who had refused to leave and the public development company Ensanche 21 began the final eviction processes.

By October 2010, the European debt crisis had become so bad that the city council and Ensanche 21 decided to freeze the project. Without money or political capital behind the project, the plans for development stopped. By this point in time, Ensanche 21 and the city had succeeded in evicting all but 15 families, and planned to finish the eviction process in 2011 even though no development would take place. As the crisis continued and the project remained on hold, the neighbourhood fell into disrepair and the remaining families continued to leave little by little. By 2013, there were only 10 individuals living in the neighbourhood and almost all of the houses had been stripped of copper and other valuable materials.

== Errekaleor Bizirik ==
=== Occupation ===
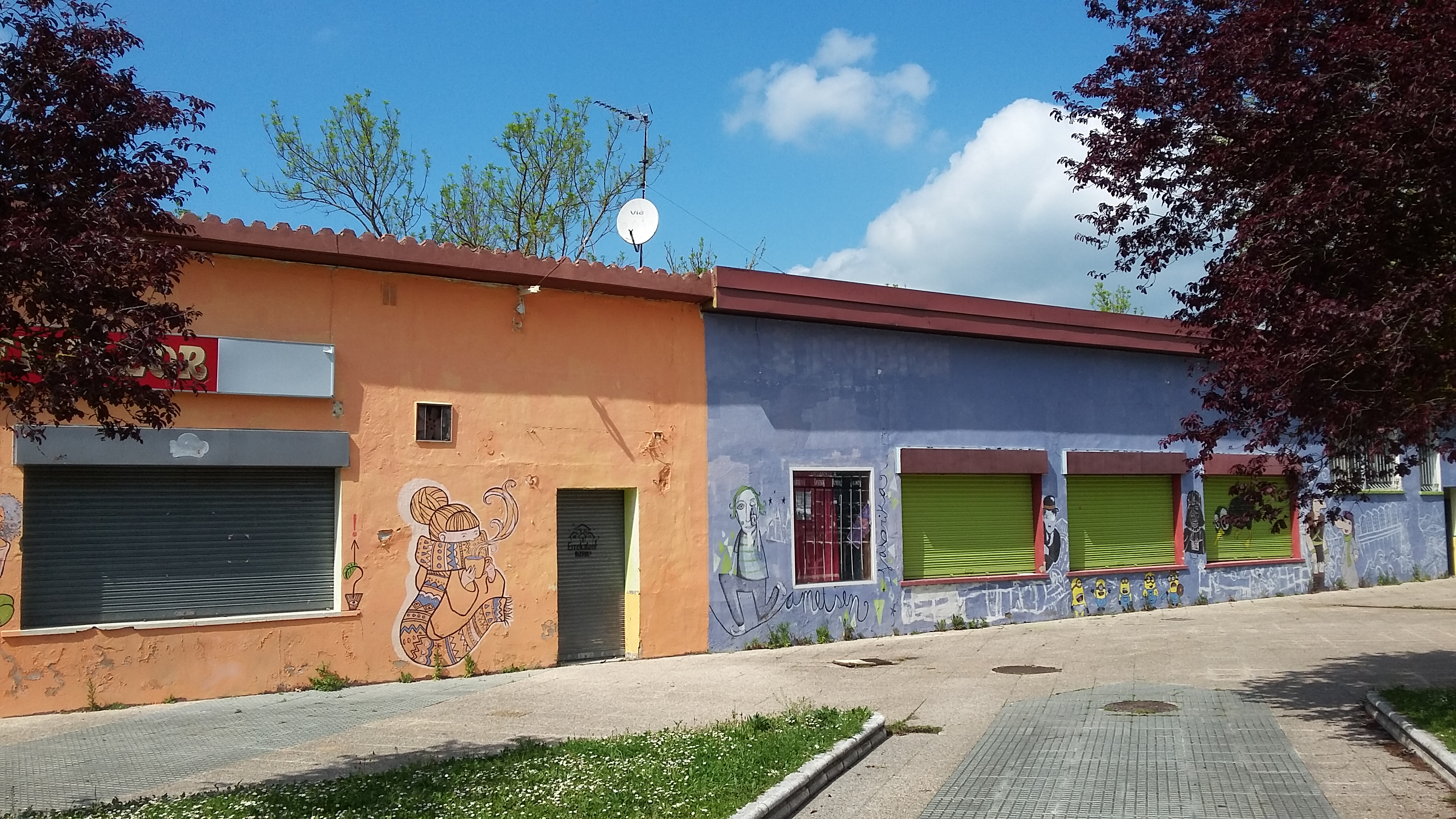
Renovated shopfronts in Errekaleor in 2016

On 3 September 2013, a group of university students squatted in one of the 32 apartment blocks with the permission of the few inhabitants that remained in the neighbourhood. The project quickly grew to 150 participants at the end of 2016, making it the biggest squatter-occupied space on the Iberian Peninsula.

The occupation was a result of the original group's reflection on the problem of affordable housing for young people in Vitoria-Gasteiz and a way of taking direct action against the real estate speculation in the region. A university lecturer living at the project commented in 2016 "This is a self-managed neighbourhood. We intend to offer alternatives to the system, and we are creating them ourselves."

From this point on, the neighbourhood became known as Errekaleor Bizirik (Errekaleor Lives) and a project of self-sufficiency and autonomous communal living began. The group explained their action as a way of solving their personal housing problems in a city with very high housing prices, as well as a way of denouncing the real estate speculation that they saw as the cause for the abandonment of the neighbourhood and the difficulties that the younger generation has in finding affordable housing.

=== Project ===
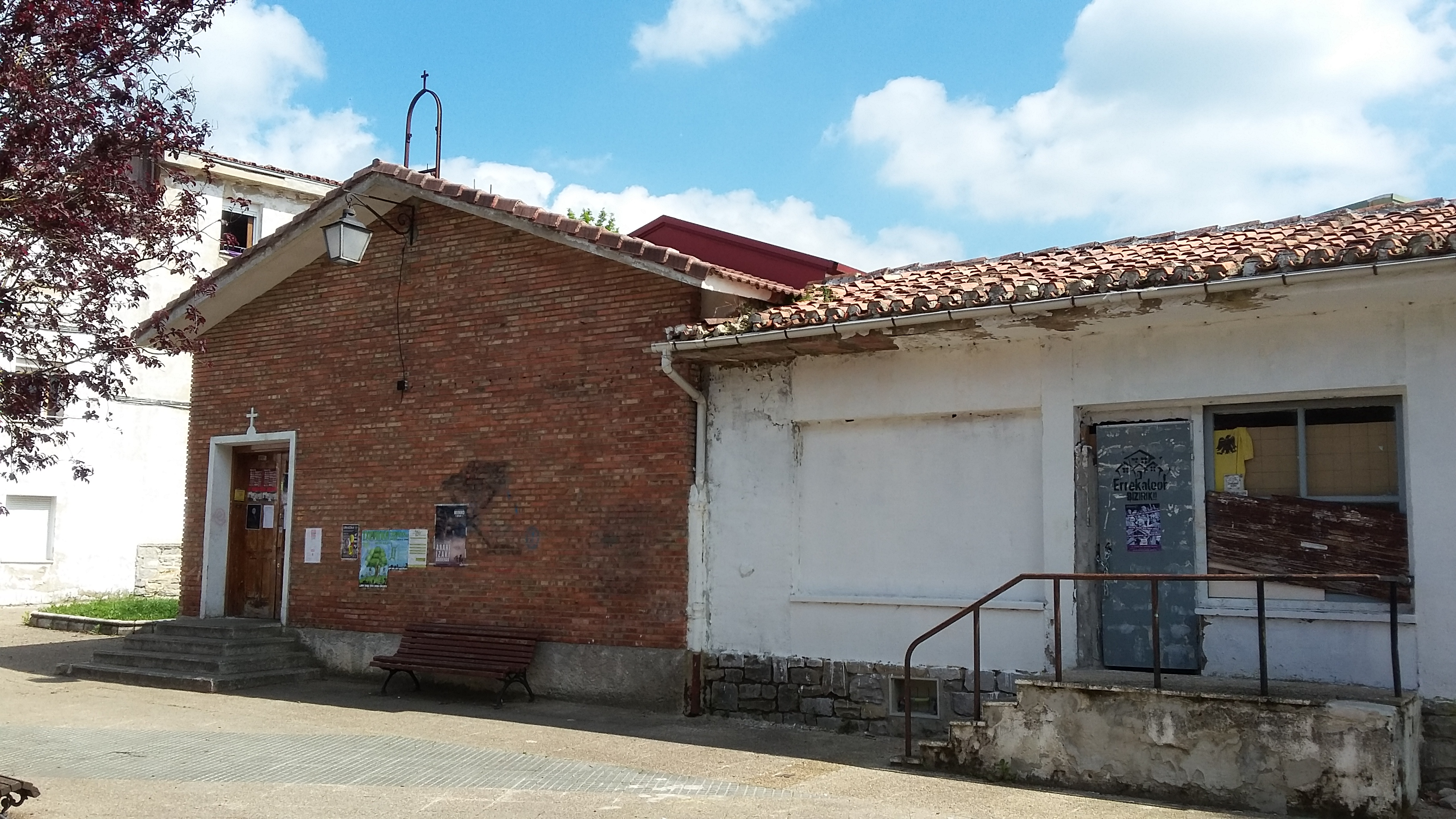
Renovated bar and recording studio (previously Catholic and Evangelical Churches)

Errekaleor Bizirik is made up of a variety of projects and services offered by its members such as a bakery, orchards, a chicken coop, a library, nursery, print shop, an Evangelical Church which has been converted into a recording studio, classrooms for teaching the Basque language and other subjects, a fronton (a traditional Basque sports court for playing pelota), a cinema of 115 seats, a free shop, an organic farm of 2 hectares, playgrounds for children, a bar and a 'gaztetxe' social centre. In development are projects such as restoration of the riverfront, self-production of gourmet mushrooms, a radio station, a herb garden and an independent energy grid made up of solar panels, turbines and bicycle generators.

The entire project is based on autogestion (self-management or autonomy), consensus based decision making, feminism, anti-capitalism, and Basque cultural re-invigoration. In this new system of organization, the 192 apartments are organized into self-sufficient but interconnected blocks (Basque: 'bloke', Spanish: 'bloques'). One block is inhabited only by women.

=== Eviction threat ===
As the neighbourhood changed from an abandoned area to a new alternative cultural project, the city and the legal owners of the property, Ensanche 21, decided to start working to reclaim control of the terrain. In February 2014, the city approved the eviction of the occupied buildings and in March 2015 city officials and riot police entered the neighbourhood to cut the electricity and change the locks of the communal buildings. The city council explained the action by stating that "Recent expert reports have determined that there is a risk to the safety of persons illegally living in such buildings, so they must be evicted to ensure their safety."

The occupiers responded with legal statements from electricians, architects, and other professionals that affirmed the safety of the neighbourhood, but the city refused to reconnect the electricity. In response, the residents reconnected the cables themselves, and continued to expand the project into new buildings.

The mayor of Vitoria-Gasteiz, Gorka Urtaran of the PNV, met representatives of Errekaleor Bizirik in November 2015 with an offer to move all the current residents to a neighbourhood in Aretxabaleta. Errekaleor would then be demolished. The assembly of Errekaleor Bizirik rejected the offer, responding:

It is imperative to continue in Errekaleor. Because of the physical living conditions it offers us, because of the time and effort we have invested in this space, the community we have created, and above all, because as the name Errekaleor Bizirik indicates, reviving the neighbourhood is one of the fundamental pillars of this project...We created and are creating Errekaleor Bizirik in response to many of the conditions in modern life, using self-management and an assembly process. By doing so, someone who is accustomed to behave as a passive subject of society becomes an active agent and responsible for his or her own life; Each person becomes a protagonist in his or her present and all of the factors that affect their day to day life ... Errekaleor Bizirik and its participants have many rights that institutions can not guarantee. Here we value and create our rights to culture, community, food and more.

Despite this rejection, the city council continued to try to evict the residents, which continues to be resisted by legal challenges on the part of Errekaleor Bizirik. In 2016, the city proposed emptying the neighbourhood under a legal procedure known as "eviction due to precariousness," but this required a judicial decree that the area is in a precarious and unsafe condition. During this time, repression against the neighbourhood began increasing, with reports of threats and physical assaults of members of the project.

Occupations such as Errekaleor Bizirik are not uncommon in the Basque country, and neither are governmental attempts to evict and criminalize these activities.

=== Electricity ===
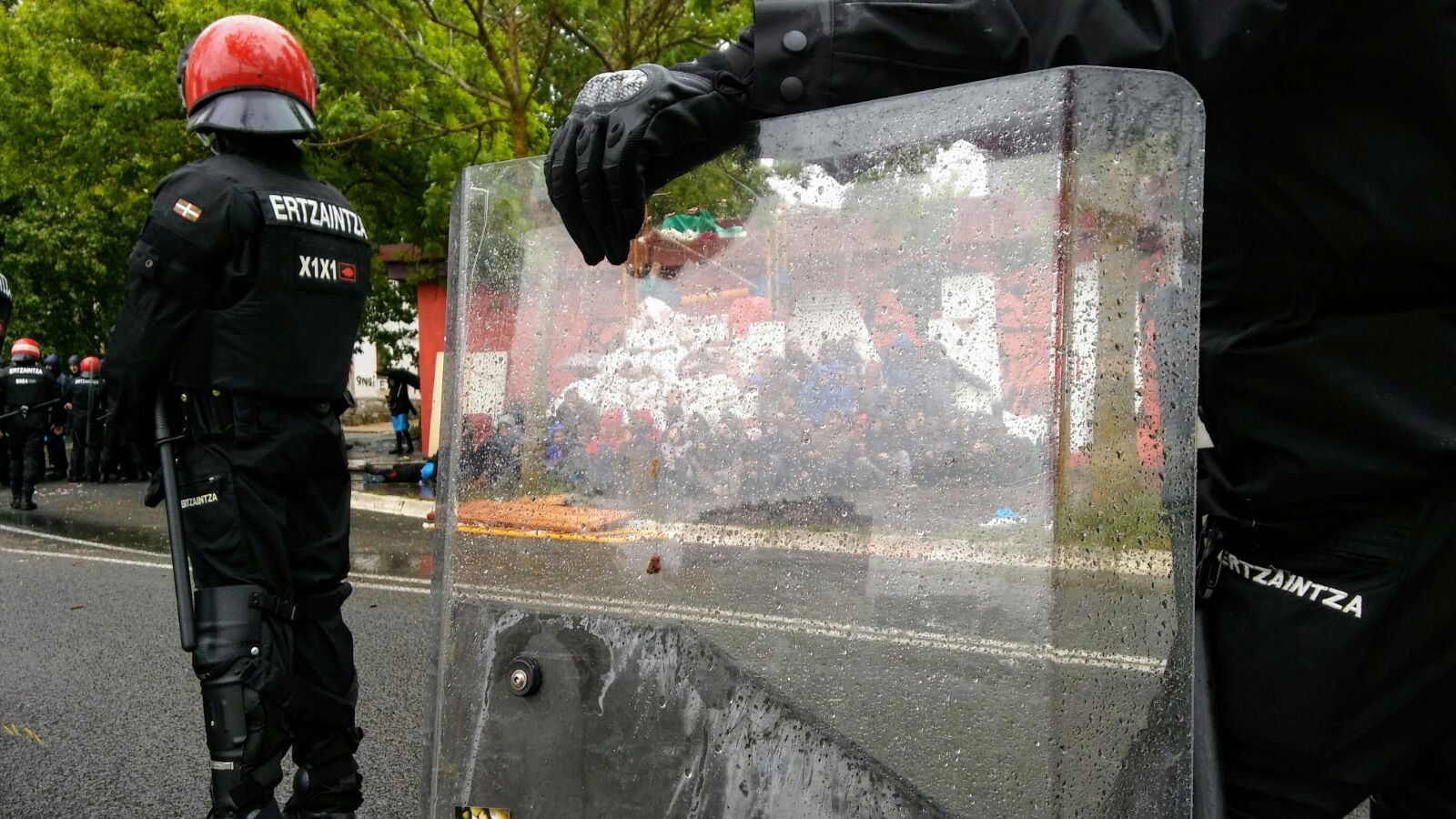
Riot police planning to cut the neighbourhood's electricity.

On the morning of 18 May 2017, members of the electrical company Iberdrola and a large contingent of Ertzaintza (riot police) entered the neighbourhood with the intention of cutting the electricity again by accessing the main transformer. The order was given by the Department of Industry of the Basque government.

Because of passive resistance in front of the transformer which included a 'human wall' and residents locking themselves to a metal structure in front of the door, the police and electric workers could not access the transformer. Instead they cut the main electrical line and took out hundreds of metres of cable from the ground. Due to the ongoing electrical contracts inside the neighbourhood and by houses connected to this cable, legal charges were then pressed against Ensanche 21 and Iberdrola. Whilst Iberdrola gave electrical generators to the houses with contracts, the majority of the neighbourhood remained without external electric power.

The mayor, Gorka Urtaran, insisted that he had always wanted to offer an alternative living space for the group, an offer which was rejected by Errekaleor Bizirik, who according to him, "have it in their DNA not to negotiate because it is an anti-system collective which does not want to talk to public administrations". Urtaran also said "The objective of the City Council has always been very clear: to bulldoze Errekaleor to create organic farms which create continuity in the Green Belt of Gasteiz. We have never contemplated that the neighbourhood could remain as it is; this is about recovering what was once a natural green space, and never to financially speculate in the area."

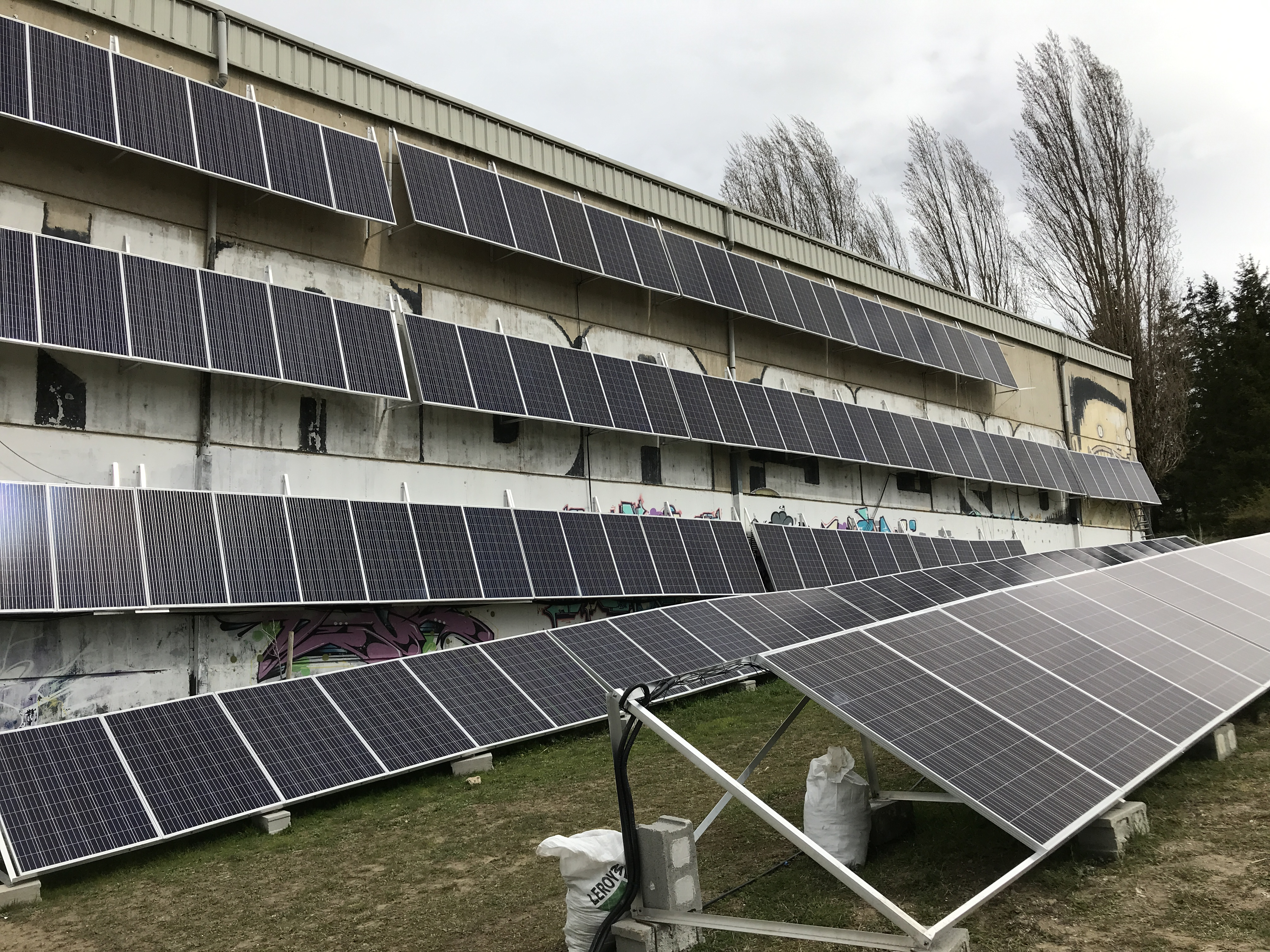
Solar panels on the terrain in 2018.

In response to the reasons given by the government and electrical company to cut the power, the members of Errekaleor Bizirik have denied safety issues in the electrical installation and offered signed statements from professional electricians that attest to the safety of the infrastructure. Errekaleor Bizirik stated that this was another attempt to evict residents from the self-managed project. In the following days, the mayor released a statement that he had ordered Ensanche 21 to begin planning an eviction of the neighbourhood. Following the power cut and removal of electrical cable by the company Iberdrola, Errekaleor Bizirik made an appeal for electric generators.

Since Iberdrola refused to reconnect the electricity, Errekaleor Bizirik installed a sustainable and independent electric grid, installing bicycle electricity generators and solar panels, as well as remodelling the communal showers and washing facilities to function without electricity. The project crowdfunded 100,000 euros to buy solar panels.

=== Murals ===
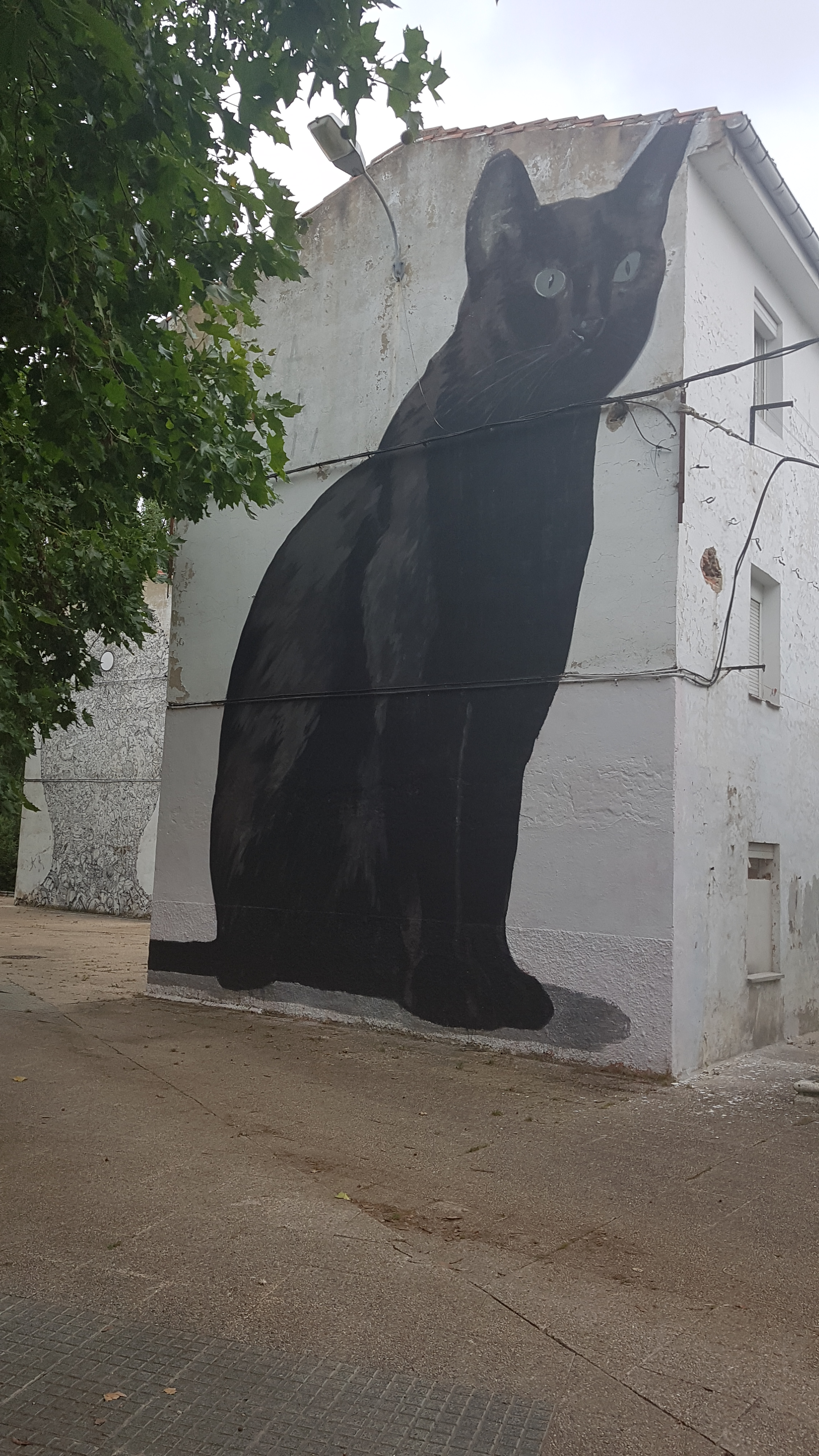
'The nights are ours' (Basque: 'Gauak gureak dira' painted by Escif XLF

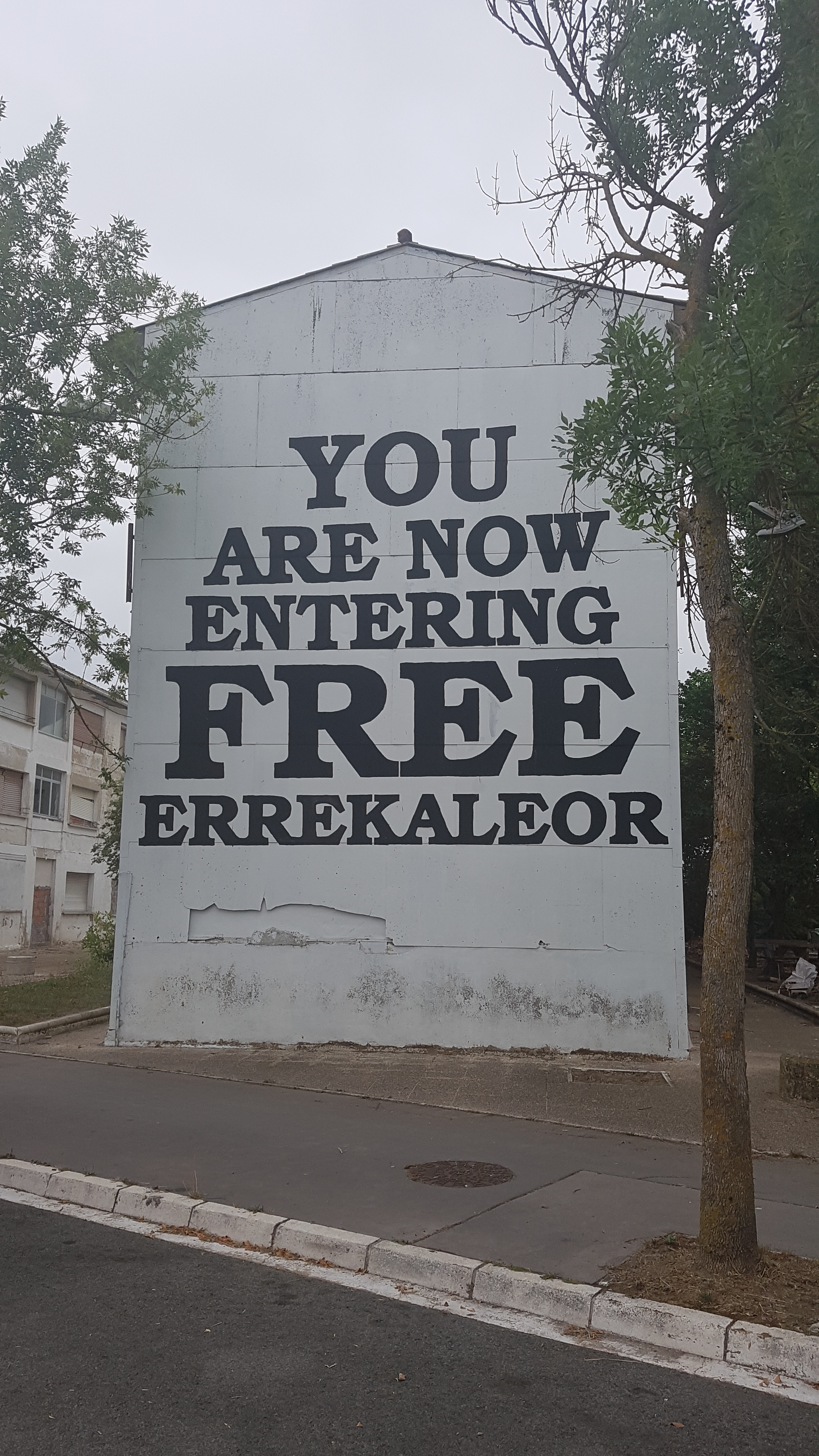
"You are now entering free Errekaleor"

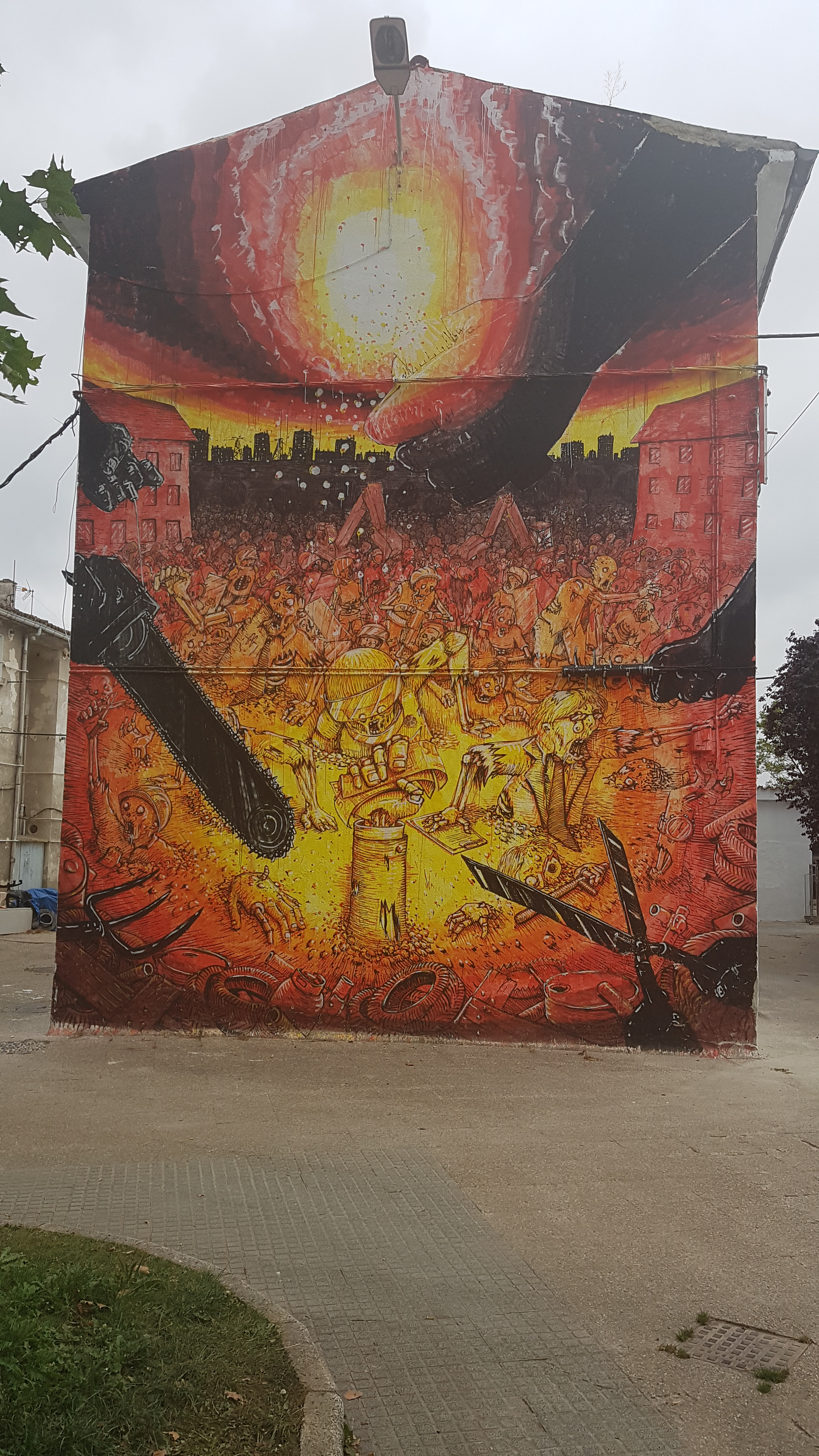
Mural by Blu

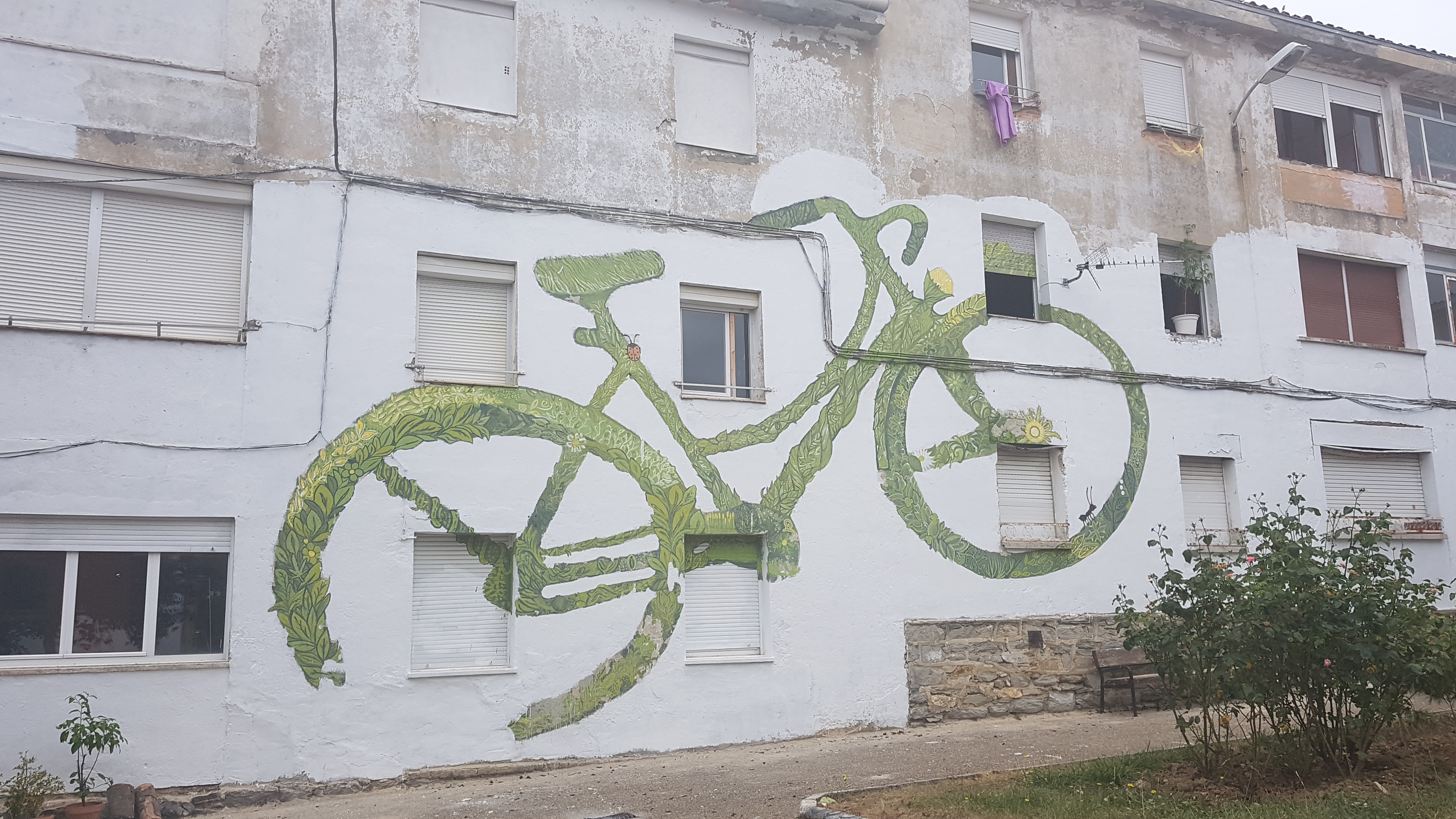
Mural at Txirrinka

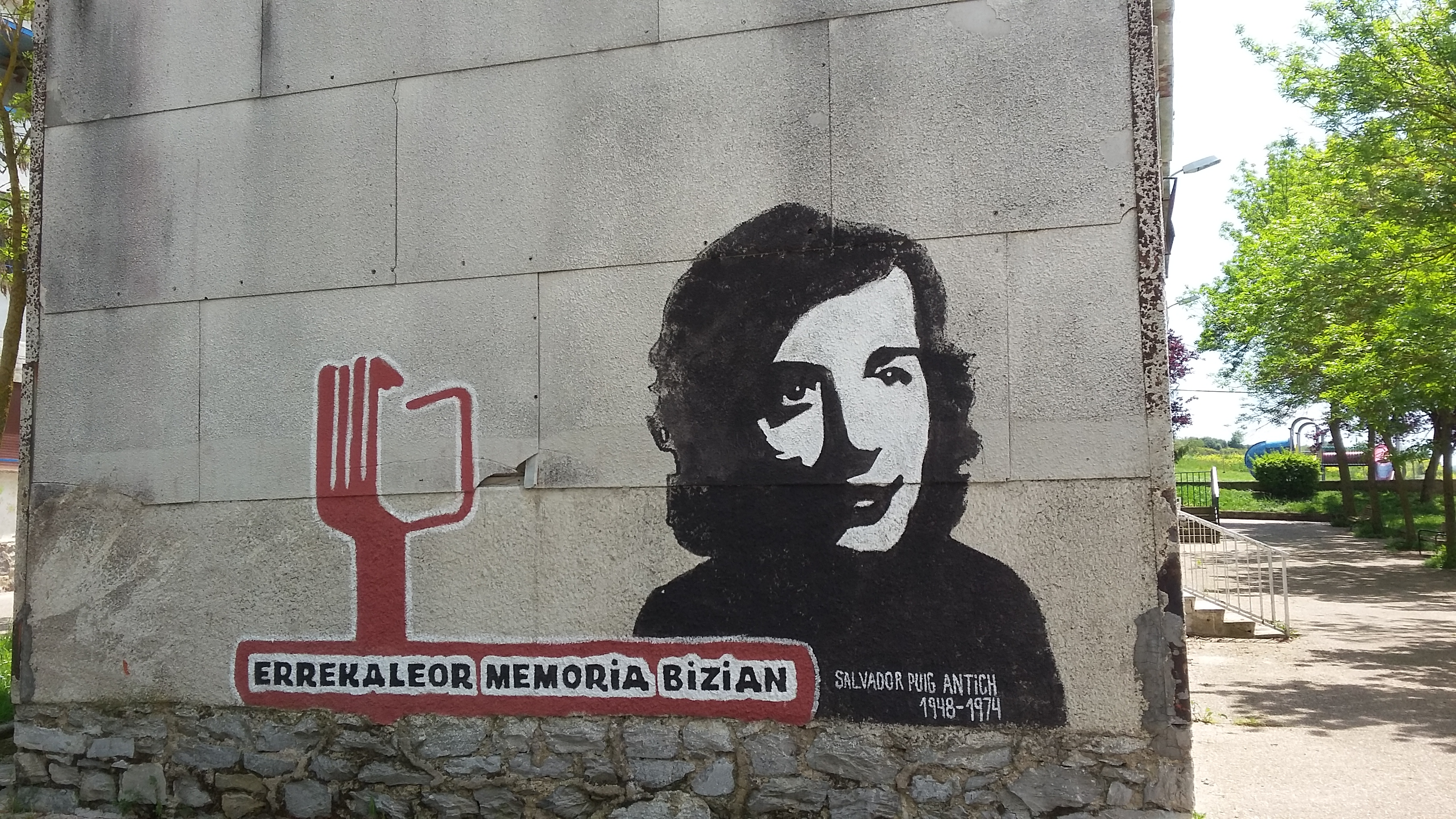
Mural in memory of Salvador Puig Antich

Artists have painted murals on the 32 blocks of the terrain. There is a mural to commemorate the death of Salvador Puig Antich in 1974. Blu and Escif painted two murals each in 2017, in order to support the project's crowdfunding plan.

== See also ==
- Freetown Christiania
- Kukutza
- ZAD de Notre-Dame-des-Landes
