= Ignacio Cosidó =

Spanish politician

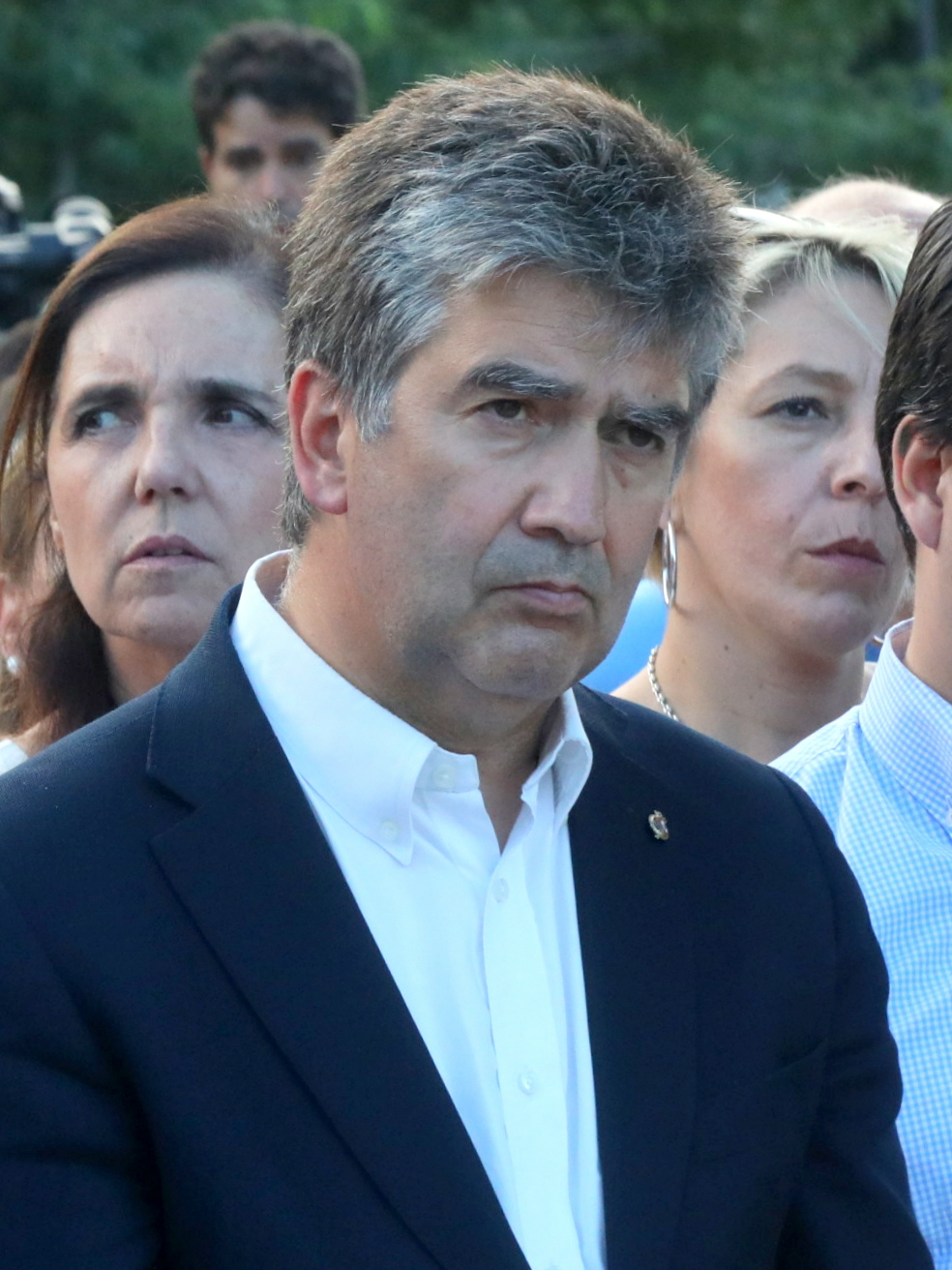
- In 2018.

Spanish Senator designated by the Cortes of Castile and León
- In office 14 December 2016 – 23 July 2019

Director General of the National Police
- In office 2 January 2012 – 2016
- Preceded by: Francisco Javier Velázquez López
- Succeeded by: Germán López Iglesias

Member of the Congress of Deputies
- In office 2011 – 2 January 2012
- Constituency: Palencia
- In office 2008–2011
- Constituency: Palencia

Member of the Senate
- In office 2004–2008
- Constituency: Palencia

Personal details
- Born: 31 July 1965 (age 61) Salamanca, Spain
- Citizenship: Spanish
- Party: People's Party
- Education: Complutense University; National University of Distance Education

Ignacio Cosidó Gutiérrez (born in 1965) is a Spanish conservative politician, member of the People's Party (PP). He has been member of both the Lower and Upper House of the Cortes Generales, and directed the National Police Corps from 2012 to 2016. From 2018 to 2019, he served as Spokesperson of the PP parliamentary group in the Senate.

== Biography ==
=== Early life ===
Born on 31 July 1965 in Salamanca, Cosidó graduated in political science at the Complutense University of Madrid. He has been a prominent collaborator of the neo-conservative Grupo de Estudios Estratégicos (GEES) think-tank.

His political activity began in 1988, as Secretary General of the "Liberal Youths". He later served as Secretary of Political Action of the New Generations (NN.GG.) of the People's Party (PP), reading in 1994 his PhD thesis in History at the National University of Distance Education before a tribunal formed by historian Javier Tusell, Juan Gómez Castañeda, fellow GEES colleague Florentino Portero, as well as two members of the Congress of Deputies representing the PP, Cristóbal Montoro and Luis Gamir Casares.

After the win of the PP in the 1996 general election, he became and assistant to the new Director General of the Civil Guard, Santiago López Valdivieso.

=== First spell at Cortes Generales ===
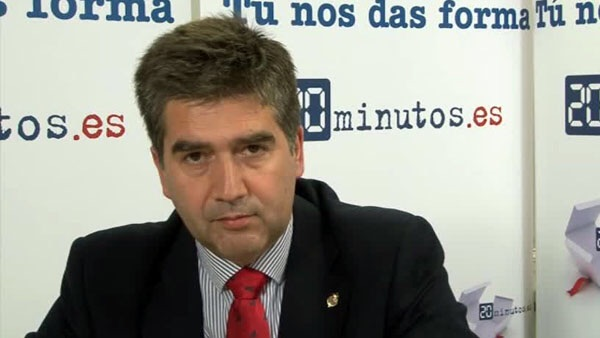
Interviewed by 20minutos.es in March 2011

He was elected Senator in 2004 general election, representing the province of Palencia. Aligned to the most reactionary wing of the PP, he acquired a political profile bashing the PSOE in the Senate, with the later party having arrived to power after the general election. In 2005, Cosidó derided Gregorio Peces-Barba, the new High Commissioner for Support to the Victims of Terrorism and one of the Fathers of the 1978 Spanish Constitution, as "High Commissioner for (offering) dialog and shelter to terrorist executioners". He also adhered to the conspiracy theories surrounding the authorship of the 11-M train bombings in Madrid.

He was elected member of the Congress of Deputies in the 2008 general election, also representing Palencia. He was re-elected in the November 2011 general election.

=== Director General of the Police ===
Appointed in December 2011 (after the win of the PP in the general election and the subsequent arrival to the premiership of Mariano Rajoy) as Director General of the National Police Corps (CNP), Cosidó took office on 2 January 2012. During his spell as director of the CNP, Cosidó created in 2012 the Strategic Planning and Coordination Unit (Unidad de Planificación Estratégica y Coordinación), of uncertain functions, as purposed solely towards analysis, the special unit worked as sort of full-blown intelligence agency, thus it got the moniker of "la CIA de Cosidó".

After taking office, new minister Juan Ignacio Zoido re-shifted the high-ranking officials of his Ministry in late 2016, removing Cosidó from office.

=== Return to the Senate ===
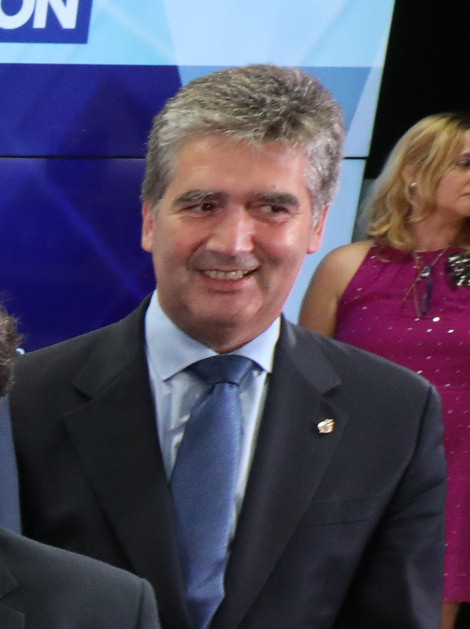
In September 2018, during a conference offered by his party leader at La Razón.

In December 2016, Cosidó returned to the Senate, as he was designated Senator by the Cortes of Castile and León, with the sole support in the regional parliament from the PP's parliamentary group. After the ascension of Pablo Casado to the presidency of the People's Party (now in the opposition after the successful vote of no confidence in Mariano Rajoy) in the summer of 2018, the new PP leader appointed Cosidó as Spokesperson of the PP parliamentary group in the Spanish Upper house, where the party enjoyed an absolute majority of senators.

In November 2018 a WhatsApp message of Cosidó directed at the members of the PP group at the Senate became public. In that message, Cosidó took pride in the deal tentatively agreed between the PP and the PSOE to renovate the General Council of the Judiciary (CGPJ), as the collegiate body responsible for appointing judges would have Conservative Manuel Marchena as president, while he also emphasized that the PP would somehow retain a "backdoor control" over the 2nd Penal Hall of the Supreme Court (responsible for judging legislators and government members) and would "preside" over the 61st Hall (responsible for the illegalization of political parties). Harshly criticised over this perceived partisan understanding of the judicial power and with the political rivals asking for his resignation, he lamented the tone of the message but declined to step down, as he declared to enjoy full support from his party leader, Casado. Marchena renounced then to the potential candidacy to the dual presidency of the CGPJ and the Supreme Court, and the PP declared any sort of deal with the PSOE to renovate the body "broken" as long as the minister of Justice Dolores Delgado did not resign, thus de facto prolonging the mandate of Carlos Lesmes.

On 23 July 2019, the Parliament of Castile and León dismissed him and appointed Javier Maroto to replace him.

== Ideology and thought ==
A practicing Catholic, Cosidó espouses a deeply religious and conservative worldview. He is considered a "hardliner" within the PP. In 2008 Cosidó declared Muslim immigrants to be "a risk to our democracy" because, with their customs and ideas, they would bring to Spain a lifestyle presenting "serious incompatibilities".
