= Maider Etxebarria =

Spanish politician (born 1976)

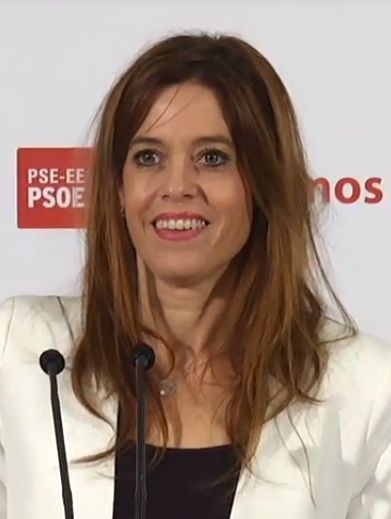
- Etxebarria in 2018

Mayor of Vitoria-Gasteiz
- Incumbent
- Assumed office 17 June 2023
- Preceded by: Gorka Urtaran

Deputy Mayor of Vitoria-Gasteiz
- In office 5 July 2019 – 17 June 2023
- Preceded by: Peio López de Munain
- Succeeded by: Beatriz Artolazabal

Personal details
- Born: 8 July 1976 (age 50) Vitoria-Gasteiz, Spain
- Party: PSE-EE

Maider Etxebarria García (born 8 July 1976) is a Spanish politician. A member of the Socialist Party of the Basque Country, she has served as mayor of Vitoria-Gasteiz since 2023.

== Biography ==
Maider Etxebarria was born in Vitoria-Gasteiz in 1976. She graduated as a technician in companies and tourism from the University of Deusto in 1999. She obtained a degree in German studies from the University of the Basque Country in 2014.

She was named Director of Tourism and Hospitality of the Basque Government in 2016. She served in that post until 2019, when she stood as the candidate of the Socialist Party for mayor of Vitoria-Gasteiz. Despite most opinion polls predicting a poor result for her candidacy, she finished a close second behind Gorka Urtaran of the Basque Nationalist Party. Her party entered a coalition with the Basque Nationalist Party after the election and she was subsequently named deputy mayor.

She finished second again in the 2023 election, behind Rocío Vitero of EH Bildu. In the aftermath of the election, she was elected mayor with the support of the Basque Nationalist Party and the People's Party. She is the first woman to hold the post.
