= Javier Maroto =

Spanish politician (born 1972)

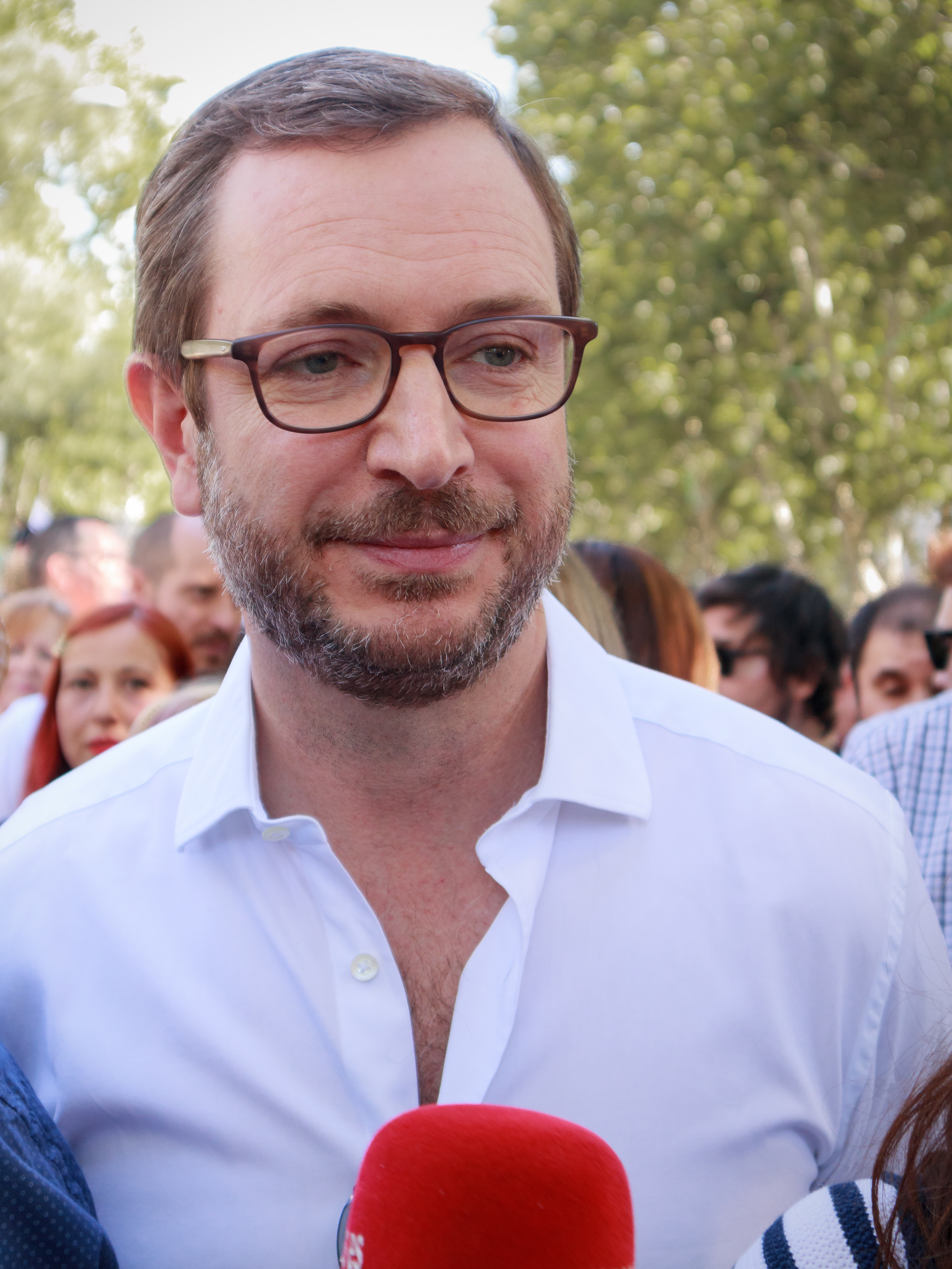

First Vice President of the Senate of Spain
- Incumbent
- Assumed office 17 August 2023
- Preceded by: Cristina Narbona

Spokesperson of the Popular Group in the Senate
- Incumbent
- Assumed office 30 July 2019
- Preceded by: Ignacio Cosidó

Member of the Senate
- Incumbent
- Assumed office 24 July 2019
- Appointed by: Cortes of Castile and León

Member of the Congress of Deputies
- In office 18 October 2016 – 28 April 2019
- Constituency: Álava

Member of the Basque Parliament
- In office 20 November 2012 – 30 June 2015
- Constituency: Álava

Mayor of Vitoria-Gasteiz
- In office 11 June 2011 – 13 June 2015
- Preceded by: Patxi Lazcoz
- Succeeded by: Gorka Urtaran

Personal details
- Born: Javier Ignacio Maroto Aranzábal; January 6, 1972 (age 54) Vitoria-Gasteiz, Basque Country, Spain
- Party: PP
- Spouse: José Manuel Rodríguez (m. 2015)
- Education: University of Deusto; University of Navarra

Javier Ignacio Maroto Aranzábal is a Spanish politician serving as senator from Castile and León since 24 July 2019 and spokesperson of the Popular Group in the Senate since 30 July.

He was the mayor of Vitoria-Gasteiz, from 2011 to 2015, the capital city of the Basque Country and of the province of Álava. At the same time, he served as member of the Basque Parliament and in 2016 he was elected member of the Congress of Deputies until 2019.

== Biography ==
Maroto was born in Vitoria-Gasteiz, Basque Country, on 6 January 1972.

After completing his studies at the San Viator School in Vitoria-Gasteiz, he studied Economics and Business Administration at the University of Deusto and a master's degree in public administration and management from IESE Business School. He is a People's Party politician in the Basque Country.

In 1999, he took part in the elections for Mayor of Vitoria. After having been a member of New Generations of Álava and after the victory of the People's Party (PP) in Vitoria, he held the position of Deputy Mayor and Councillor for Finance for the PP from 1999 to 2007. In his two terms under Mayor Alfonso Alonso, he also served as Government Spokesman, president of the municipal company Gilsa, during which he was responsible for the management of industrial land in Vitoria; and Councillor in Charge of New Technologies.

In 2008 Maroto became the spokesman for the People's Party in Vitoria, and served on the board of the municipal company Widening 21, which was in charge of urban expansion in Vitoria's new Salburua and Zabalgana areas. He was also the secretary of the People's Party in Álava, and one of the few members of the party who have publicly criticized its position on gay marriage. On November 5, 2010, in an interview with Radio Vitoria, he stated that "it would be a mistake to eliminate the gay marriage bill".

On June 23, 2010, Maroto submitted his candidacy for mayor of Vitoria for 2011. He won the election on May 22, 2011, earning a score of 9 seats, and was declared mayor on June 11, 2011.

On May 24, 2015, Maroto's party received the most votes and won 9 seats in the local elections of 2015. However, on June 13, 2015, Gorka Urtaran from the Basque Nationalist Party was declared mayor after gaining the votes of the councillors of EH Bildu, Sumando-Hemen Gaude and Irabazi.

On June 18, 2015, he was appointed Sectorial Under-secretary of the People's Party by Mariano Rajoy, becoming a member of the People's Party's national board.

He lost his seat in Congress in the 2019 Spanish general election, but the Cortes of Castile and León designated him as senator on 24 July 2019.

== Family life ==
In June 2015, Maroto announced his engagement to longtime partner José Manuel "Josema" Rodríguez. The wedding was held on 18 September 2015 at Vitoria's city hall. The wedding gained political significance when it was announced that Prime Minister Mariano Rajoy, who had challenged the law approving same sex marriage when he was Opposition leader, would be attending the wedding as a guest.

== Awards ==
During the ceremony for the European Green Capital Award, passed from one Covenant signatory city to another, on November 29, 2012, Maroto gave the floor to Patrick Rimbert, Mayor of Nantes. Vitoria-Gasteiz was the Green Capital of Europe in 2012, and Nantes was the Green Capital in 2013.
