= Marchena (surname) =

Marchena is a surname of Spanish origin with Mozarabic influence and may refer to:

- Adriana Marchena (born 1956), Venezuelan runner
- Carlos Marchena (born 1979), Spanish footballer
- Héctor Marchena (born 1965), Costa Rican footballer
- José Marchena Ruiz de Cueto (1768–1821), Spanish author
- Manuel Marchena (born 1959), Spanish supreme court judge
- Pepe Marchena, Spanish flamenco singer José Tejada Marín (1903–1976)

== See also ==
- Melchor de Marchena, Spanish flamenco guitarist born Melchor Jimenez Torres (1907–1980)
