= Patxi Lazcoz =

Spanish lawyer and former politician

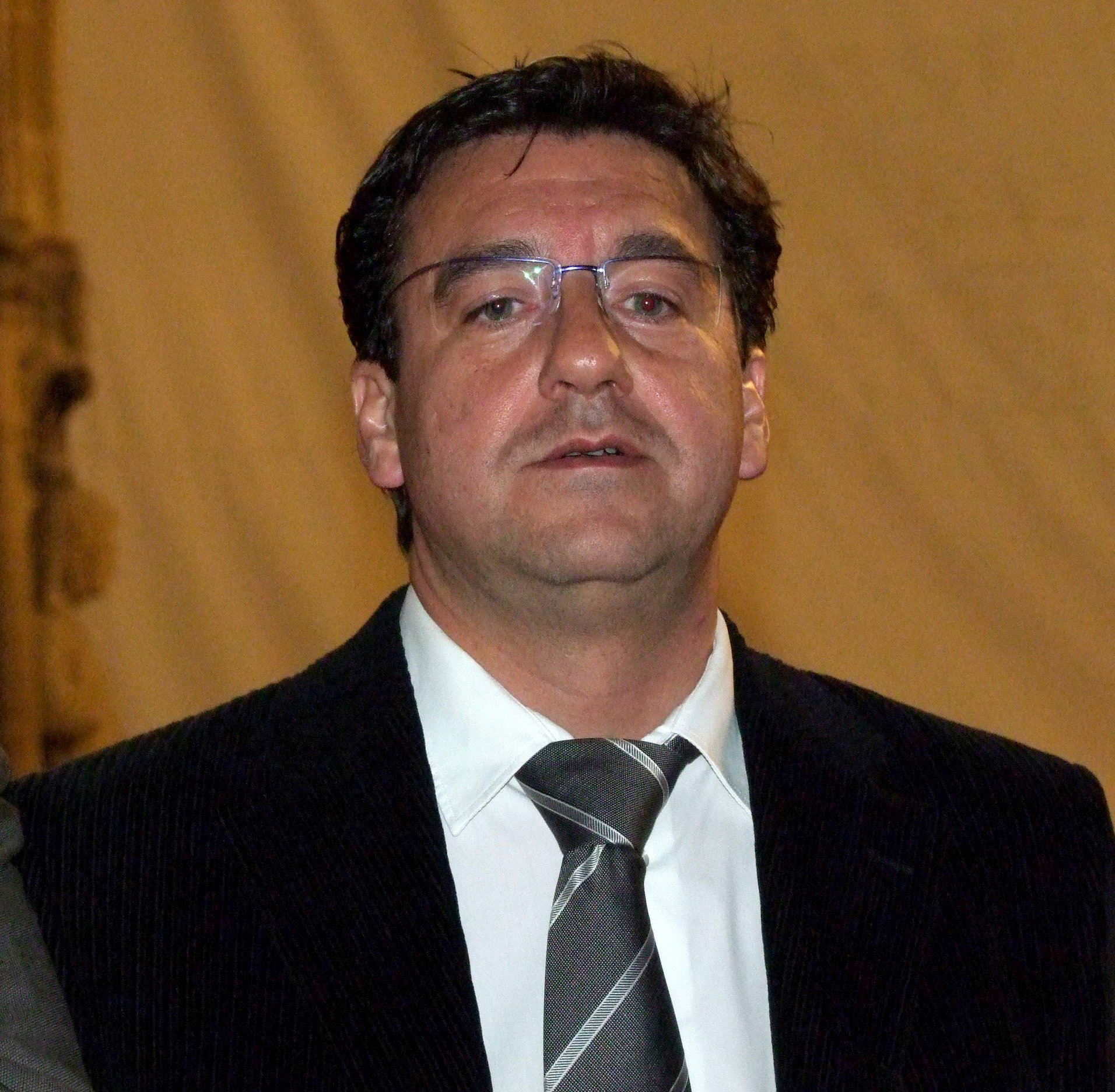

Mayor of Vitoria-Gasteiz
- In office 16 June 2007 – 11 June 2011
- Preceded by: Alfonso Alonso
- Succeeded by: Javier Maroto

Member of the Vitoria-Gasteiz City Council
- In office 4 July 1991 – 13 June 2015

Personal details
- Born: 30 August 1965 (age 61) Pamplona, Navarre, Spain
- Party: Spanish Socialist Workers' Party (PSOE)
- Education: University of Deusto
- Profession: Lawyer

Francisco Javier "Patxi" Lazcoz Baigorri (born 30 August 1965) is a Spanish lawyer and former politician of the Spanish Socialist Workers' Party (PSOE). He spent his entire political career from 1991 to 2015 as a city councillor in the Basque capital of Vitoria-Gasteiz, serving as party leader from 2003, and mayor from 2007 to 2011.

== Biography ==
Lazcoz was born in Pamplona, Navarre and raised in Vitoria-Gasteiz in the Basque Country from the age of seven. He graduated in Law from the University of Deusto. He married twice, fathering two sons and a daughter.

At the age of 22, Lazcoz joined the Socialist Party of the Basque Country–Basque Country Left (PSE-EE), the regional branch of the Spanish Socialist Workers' Party (PSOE). He was elected to the city hall of Vitoria-Gasteiz in 1991, serving in the local government under mayor José Ángel Cuerda of the Basque Nationalist Party (EAJ-PNV). In 1999, both parties went into opposition as Alfonso Alonso of the People's Party (PP) became mayor, and in 2003 Lazcoz became the Socialist leader in the city hall and ran for mayor, losing to the incumbent.

In the 2007 local elections, the PSE-EE received the most votes and Lazcoz was installed as the first Socialist mayor in the city's history. In October 2010, Vitoria-Gasteiz was given the European Green Capital Award for 2012 ahead of more favoured bids such as that of Barcelona.

Lazcoz was defeated in the 2011 election by PP candidate Javier Maroto. Among the reasons for his defeat was the planned BAI Center venue, whose budget of €157 million budget was considered excessive in the Spanish financial crisis and was immediately scrapped by Maroto. In October 2014, he confirmed that he would not run in 2015, in order to leave politics to the next generation; he also left his internal roles in the PSE-EE in the province of Álava. In October 2015, he opened a law firm.
