= Alfonso Alonso =

Spanish politician (born 1967)

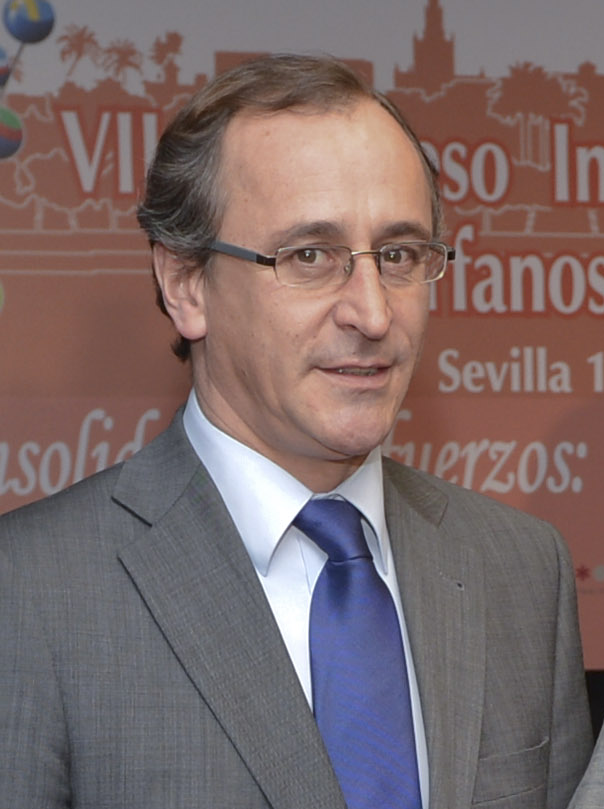

Minister of Health, Social Services and Equality
- In office 3 December 2014 – 16 August 2016
- Preceded by: Ana Mato
- Succeeded by: Fátima Báñez (interim)

Mayor of Vitoria-Gasteiz
- In office 4 July 1999 – 16 June 2007
- Preceded by: José Ángel Cuerda
- Succeeded by: Patxi Lazcoz

Member of the Congress of Deputies
- In office 9 March 2008 – 17 October 2016
- Constituency: Álava
- In office 28 March 2000 – 4 January 2002
- Constituency: Álava

Spokesperson of the People's Party in the Congress of Deputies
- Incumbent
- Assumed office 13 December 2011
- Leader: Mariano Rajoy
- Preceded by: Soraya Sáenz de Santamaría
- Succeeded by: Rafael Hernando

Personal details
- Born: Alfonso Alonso Aranegui; 14 April 1967 (age 59) Vitoria, Spain
- Party: PP

Alfonso Alonso Aranegui (born 14 April 1967) is a Spanish politician, member of the People's Party and Minister of Health, Social Services and Equality from 2014 to 2016.
