= Gorka Urtaran =

Spanish politician

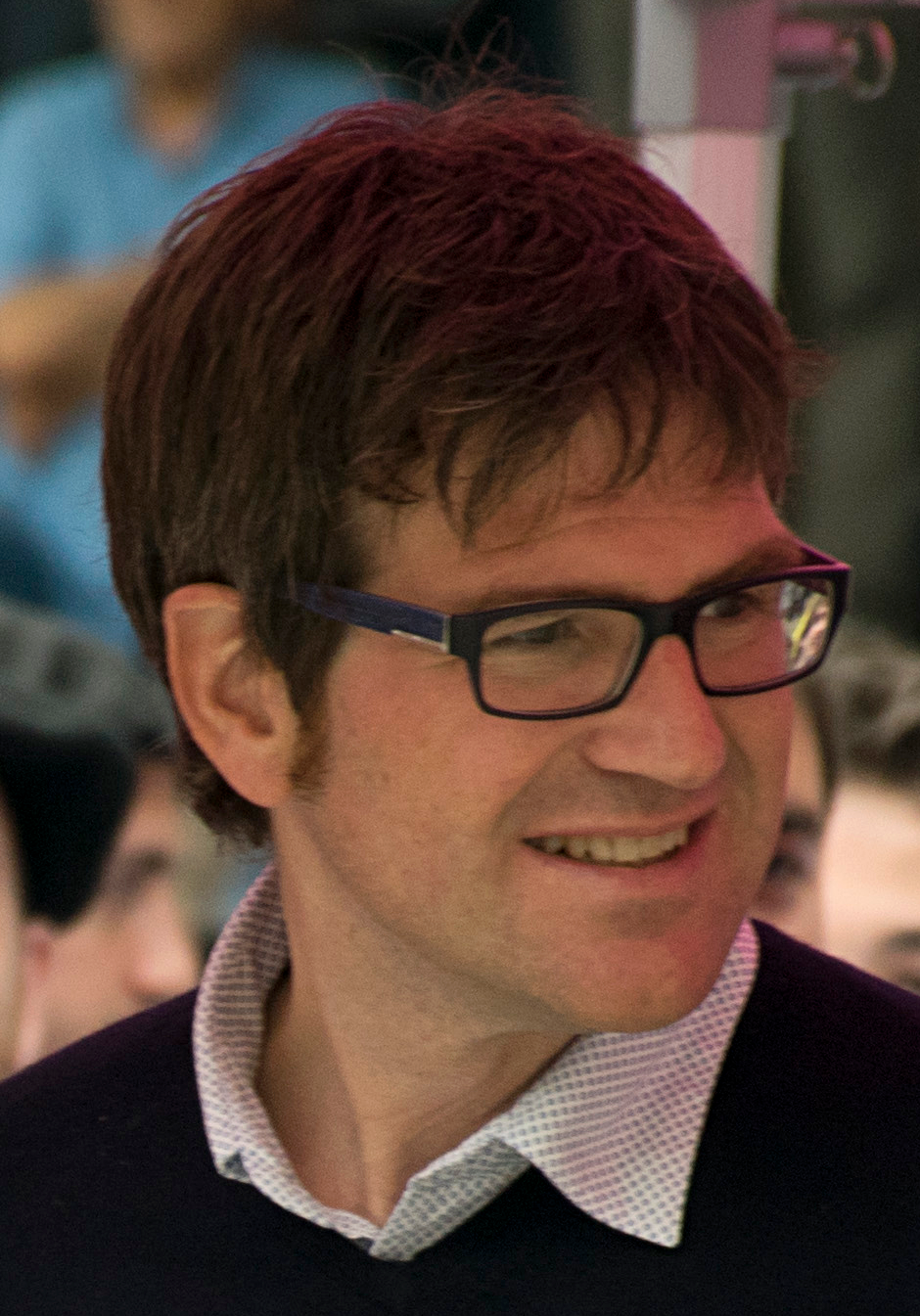

Gorka Urtaran Agirre (born 21 December 1973) is a Spanish politician of the Basque Nationalist Party (EAJ-PNV). He served as mayor of Vitoria-Gasteiz from 2015 to 2023.

== Biography ==
Urtaran was born in Vitoria-Gasteiz, Álava. His mother, María Jesús Agirre, was a Basque Nationalist Party (EAJ-PNV) politician who was deputy mayor of the city during the mandate of José Ángel Cuerda and a member of the Congress of Deputies from 1995 to 1997. He graduated in Sociology from the University of the Basque Country, where he studied at its Leioa campus and wrote a postgraduate thesis on migration.

After being a civil servant in the Vitoria-Gasteiz Department of Social Intervention, Urtaran served in his province's Juntas Generales from 2007 to 2011. In December 2010, he was confirmed as the EAJ-PNV candidate for mayor in the next year's elections. His party came second to the People's Party (PP), whose leader Javier Maroto was invested as mayor. Four years later, the EAJ-PNV lost a seat and fell to third behind the PP and EH Bildu, but Urtaran was invested as mayor with the votes of his party, EH Bildu and two smaller groups. In 2019, he won a second term with the support of the Socialist Party of the Basque Country–Basque Country Left (PSE-EE). He did not stand for reelection in 2023.
