= José Ángel Cuerda =

Spanish politician

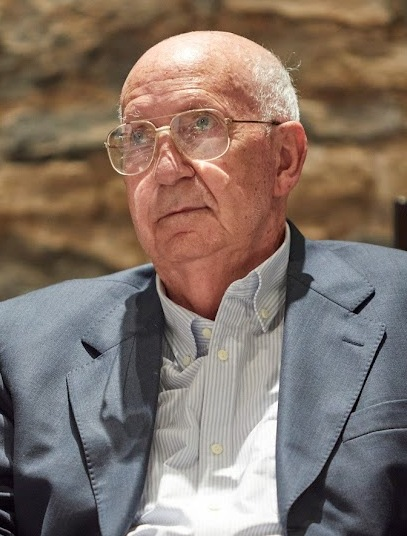

Mayor of Vitoria-Gasteiz
- In office 11 May 1979 – 4 July 1999
- Preceded by: Alfredo Marco Tabar
- Succeeded by: Alfonso Alonso

Member of Basque Parliament
- In office 22 March 1984 – 21 November 1989

Personal details
- Born: 17 March 1934 (age 92) Vitoria-Gasteiz, Spain
- Party: Basque Nationalist Party

José Ángel Cuerda Montoya (born 17 March 1934) is a Spanish politician of the Basque Nationalist Party (EAJ-PNV). He was the first democratically elected mayor of Vitoria-Gasteiz, serving from 1979 to 1999.

Cuerda was known for his promotion of the environment and green space in his city as well as championing sustainable city planning for the wellbeing of residents. Though officially a member of the right-wing PNV, he said in 2019 "I never received instructions from the PNV, nor did I stop being a member of left-wing movements in the Basque Country, Spain, or around the world".
