= Manuel Marchena =

Spanish judge and prosecutor

The Most Excellent Manuel Marchena OSRP
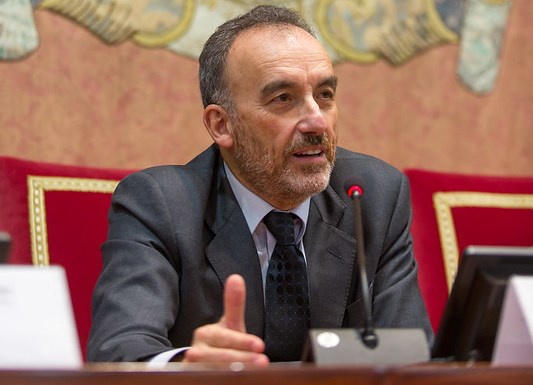

Chair of the Criminal Chamber of the Supreme Court
- In office 10 October 2014 – 5 December 2024
- Preceded by: Juan Saavedra Ruiz

Magistrate of the Supreme Court
- Incumbent
- Assumed office 31 January 2007
- Preceded by: José Antonio Martín Pallín

Personal details
- Born: Manuel Marchena Gómez; 1 March 1959 (age 67) Las Palmas, Spain
- Education: University of Deusto; University of La Laguna
- Awards: Grand Cross of the Order of St. Raymond of Peñafort

Manuel Marchena Gómez is a Spanish judge and prosecutor who serves as Magistrate of the Supreme Court.

== Biography ==
Marchena was born in Las Palmas. He studied in General Alonso High School of Laayoune, in the Spanish Sahara and in the San Ignacio de Loyola School of Las Palmas. He graduated in law from the University of Deusto, Bilbao, in 1981, obtaining the highest score in the degree exam (with Honors). He received his doctorate in law from the University of La Laguna in 1991, also obtaining the highest score, cum laude.

He developed most of his judicial career in the Provincial Court of Las Palmas, the High Court of Justice of Madrid and the Supreme Court. He has also been prosecutor, working in the Technical Secretariat of the Attorney General's Office and in the Prosecution Office of the Supreme Court. In addition, he has been Associated Professor of Law in the University of Las Palmas, in the Autonomous University of Madrid and in the CUNEF University of Madrid.

On 23 March 2007 he was appointed magistrate of the Supreme Court and on 27 October 2014 he was appointed Chair of the Criminal Chamber of the Court.

On 11 November 2018, it was rumored that he would be proposed as the next President of the Supreme Court and of the General Council of the Judiciary. On 20 November, he announced that would not present his candidacy to chair the Court.

In 2019, he was the head of the seven-member criminal court that judged the actions of the Catalan separatist leaders.

He is in possession of the distinguished Grand Cross of the Order of St. Raymond of Peñafort, granted by Order of 24 June 2002 and he is not registered in any association of jurists.

== Awards ==
He is the winner of the XX Prize The Law of Doctrinal Articles, convened by Editorial La Ley in 2006, awarded for the work: "Legal Criminal Dimension of the E-mail" and winner of the Legal Studies Prize "Foro Canario", convened by the Illustrious Bar Association of Las Palmas, Second Competition, May 1987. Granted to the work "Systematic considerations on the Law of the Parliament of the Canary Islands 1/1985 regulator of the Diputado del Común".

In 2018 he received the award of the Association of Lawyers for a Duty of Eligible Office (ALTODO), for the public recognition he made, in the sentence of which he was a speaker, to the legal aid lawyer, Cristóbal Sitjar Fernández, who defended the pederast of Ciudad Lineal, Antonio Ortiz.

Grand Cross of the Order of St. Raymond of Peñafort
